= Yema =

Yema may refer to:

== Arts ==
- Yema EP, a 2012 album by Canadian performer Damn Kids
- Yema (1987), an album by Assyrian-American musician Janan Sawa
- Yema (2013), an Algerian film by Djamila Sahraoui

== Companies ==
- Yema (watchmaker), a French watchmaking company
- Yema Auto, a Chinese automobile manufacturer

== Places ==
- Laguna Yema, Formosa, a settlement in Argentina
- Yema Township, a town in Taonan district, Jilin province, China

== Other uses ==
- Yema (candy), a sweet custard confectionery from the Philippines

== See also ==
- Yemas de Santa Teresa, a pastry originating from the province of Ávila, Spain
- Yema stabbings, a 2016 mass murder in the village of Yema, Yunnan Province, China
