= L'Epée Clocks =

Swiss luxury brand manufacturing mechanical clocks

L'Epée
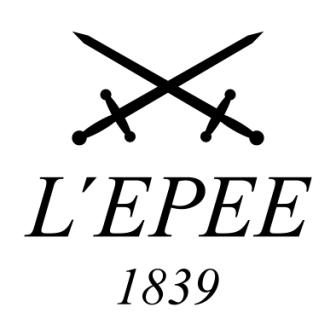
- Industry: Clockmaker
- Founded: 1839
- Founder: Auguste l'Epée
- Headquarters: Rue de Saint Maurice 1, 2800 Delémont, Jura, Switzerland, Delémont, Switzerland
- Parent: Swiza S.A.
- Website: http://www.lepee1839.ch/

L'Epée is a Swiss-based luxury brand with offices in Delémont, Canton Jura. It specializes in manufacturing mechanical clocks.

== History ==
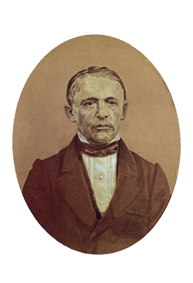
Auguste L'Epée

In 1839, Auguste L’Epée (1798–1875) and Pierre-Henri Paur (from Geneva) founded the L’Epée Manufacture in Sainte-Suzanne, Doubs Department, located in eastern France. At the time, the manufacturer produced horological products and music boxes.

Patents under the L’Epée name include an 1888 music box and a 1935 mechanical clock movement.

Swiza SA, which already owned Swiza 1904 and Matthew Norman, bought the L’Epée brand in 2008.

In 2024, L’Epée was acquired by luxury conglomerate LVMH under its watches division.
