= Damn Kids =

American musician

Stéphane Deschênes
- Also known as: Damn Kids
- Genre: Electronic music
- Years active: 2012-present

Stéphane Deschênes who uses the stage name Damn Kids, is a Canadian electronic music producer and nudist camp operator based in Toronto, Ontario, Canada. Damn Kids produces a variety of genres that are mainly categorized under electronica, bass music, and trap. Deschênes is a political activist for nudism as a family activity.

== Nudism ==
Deschênes is the owner and operator of a family focused nudist camp in Ontario, Canada. It has attracted controversy due to allowing in unaccompanied children provided they remain nude.

== Music ==
Since early 2012, Deschênes has released several productions through labels such as Provoke, Trouble & Bass, Great Stuff Recordings, Toolroom Records, Eklektisch, and Oh! My God It's Techno Music. Damn Kids' music has been featured on BBC Radio 1 shows such as Skream & Benga, Diplo & Friends, & In New DJs We Trust.

On May 21, 2012, Deschênes released his 'Yema EP' on Provoke, and reached its chart position of #32 on Beatport's Electronica Chart. Following this release, Trouble & Bass label owners AC Slater and Drop The Lime commissioned Deschênes to write an EP for the label, later to be known as 'Govudoh'. 'Naej' from 'Govudoh' charted on the Beatport Electronica Chart for five weeks, peaking at #52.

December 17, 2012 saw the release of Deschênes 2 track single entitled 'Kavoda', which sat in the Beatport Electronica Chart for nine weeks with a peek position of #29.

== Discography ==
=== Extended plays ===
Title	Details
Yema	Released: May 21, 2012; Label: Provoke; Format: Digital download, streaming
Udjo Buto	Released: July 30, 2012; Label: Provoke; Format: Digital download, streaming
Govudoh	Released: October 16, 2012; Label: Trouble & Bass; Format: Digital download, streaming
Kavoda	Released: December 17, 2012; Label: Provoke; Format: Digital download, streaming
Centoro	Released: February 11, 2013; Label: Provoke; Format: Digital download, streaming
Worthless	Released: April 23, 2013; Label: Trouble & Bass; Format: Digital download, streaming

=== Singles ===
Title	Details
Choke	Released: March 12, 2012; Label: Provoke; Format: Digital download, streaming
Pleasurekraft ft. Green Velvet - Skeleton Key (Damn Kids Remix)	Released: December 3, 2012; Label: Great Stuff Recordings; Format: Digital download, streaming
A-Bot - Deadman Walking (Damn Kids Remix)	Released: January 14, 2013; Label: Provoke; Format: Digital download, streaming
2beeps - Loose Cannon (Damn Kids Remix)	Released: March 29, 2013; Label: Oh! My God It's Techno Music; Format: Digital download, streaming
Pleasurekraft - Tarantula (Damn Kids Remix)	Released: May 28, 2013; Label: Eklektisch; Format: Digital download, streaming
