= Yema (watchmaker) =

French watchmaking company

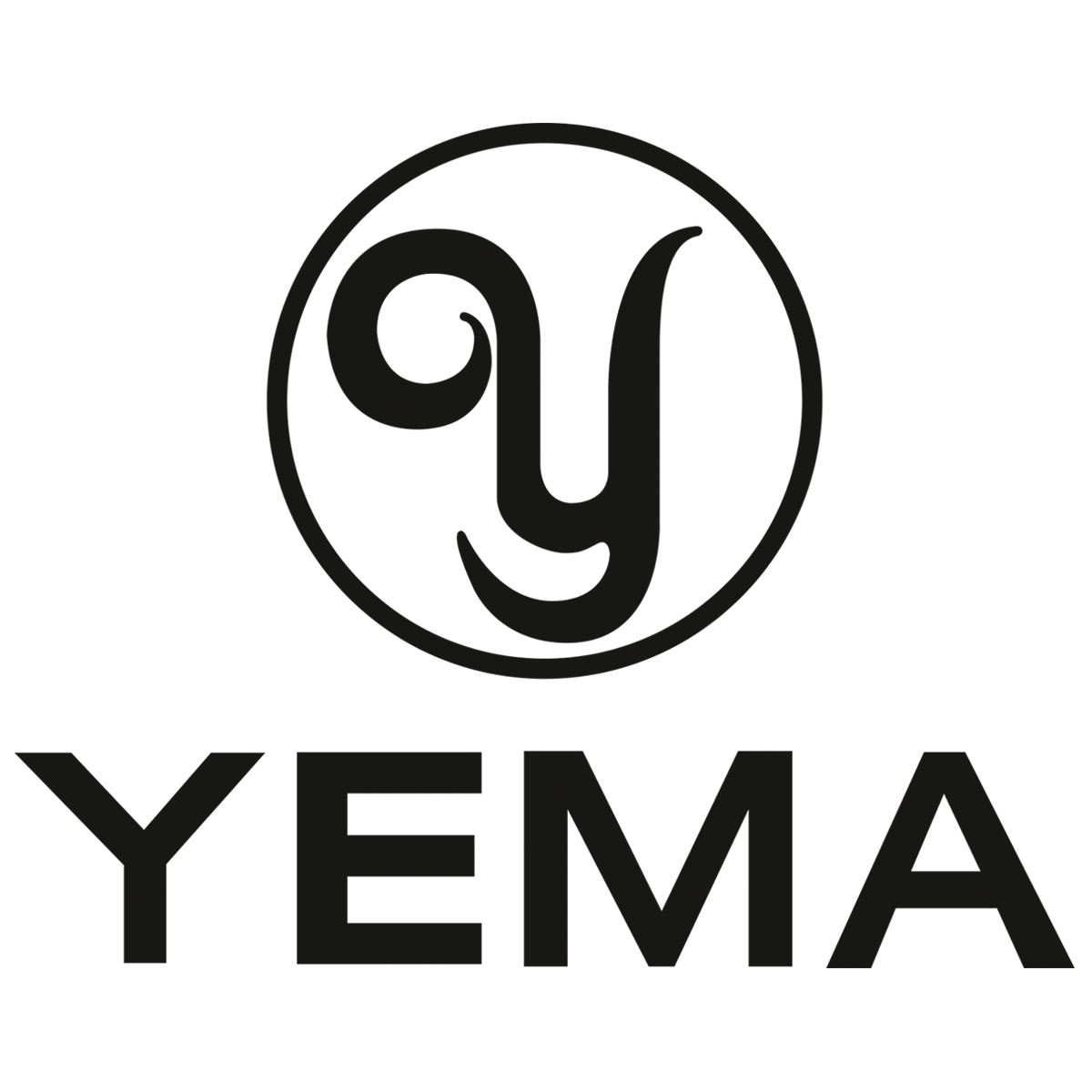
- Industry: Watch manufacturing
- Founded: 1948
- Founder: Henry Louis Belmont
- Headquarters: Besançon, France
- Products: Wristwatches, accessories
- Owner: Yema
- Website: https://en.yema.com/

Yema is a French watchmaking company that was founded and based in Besançon, France.

Since its inception, Yema brand has designed watches specifically for diving, motor racing, space exploration and sailing. Since 2009, the brand has belonged to the French watchmaking company Montres Ambre de Morteau.

== History ==
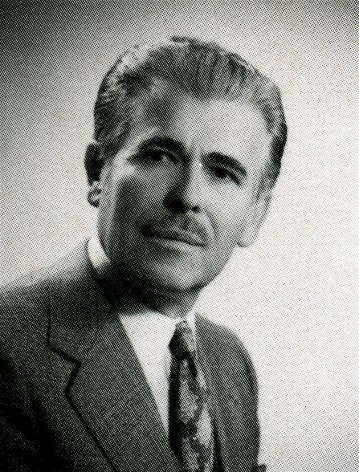
Henry Louis Belmont, French watchmaker and founder of Yema, 1948

Henry Louis Belmont, the year 1931 graduate of the National Watchmaking School of Besançon founded his watching company under the name Yema in 1948. In few decades, by the 1960s (and 1970s), Yema became the largest French watch manufacturer, producing over 500,000 watches annually.

=== 1963 - Yema Superman collection ===
In 1963, the company launched Yema Superman for divers. Many variations were produced by the company for this model of watch.

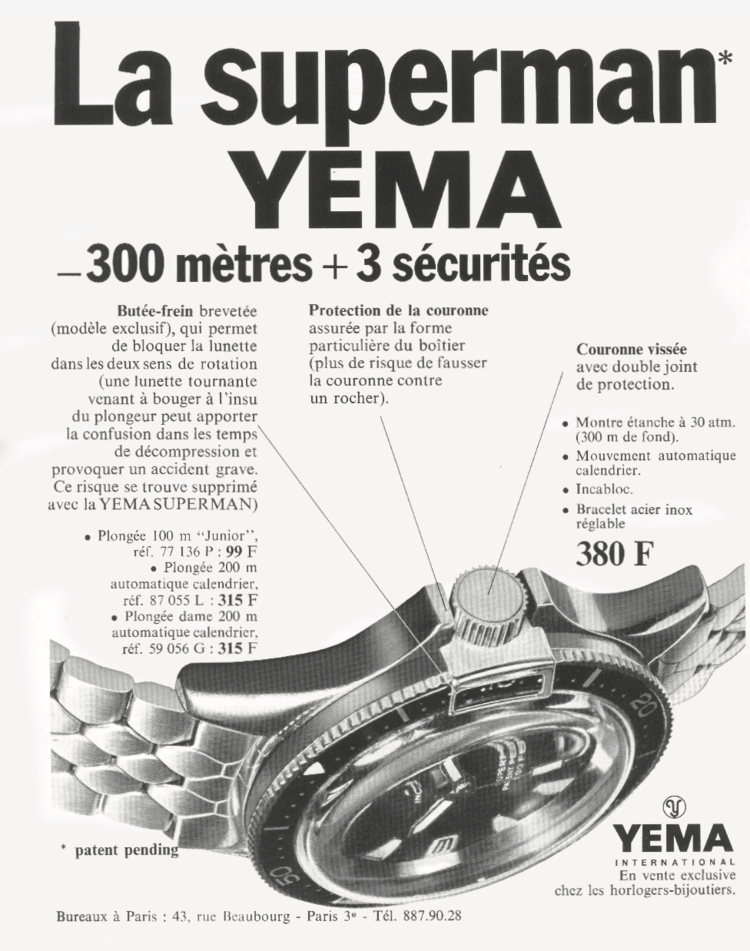
Yema Superman 1963

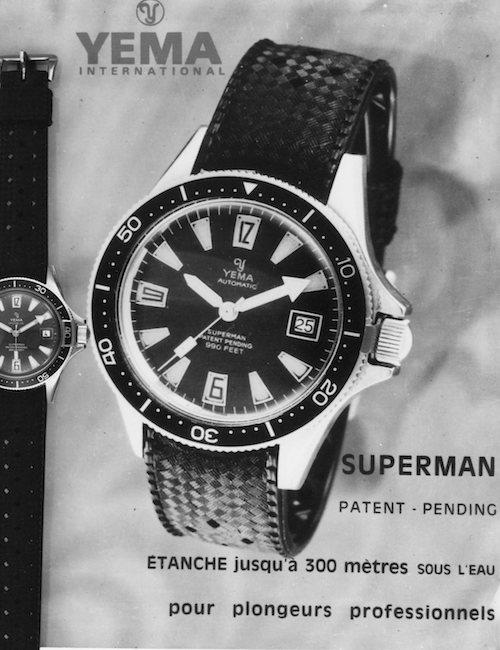
Yema Superman 1963

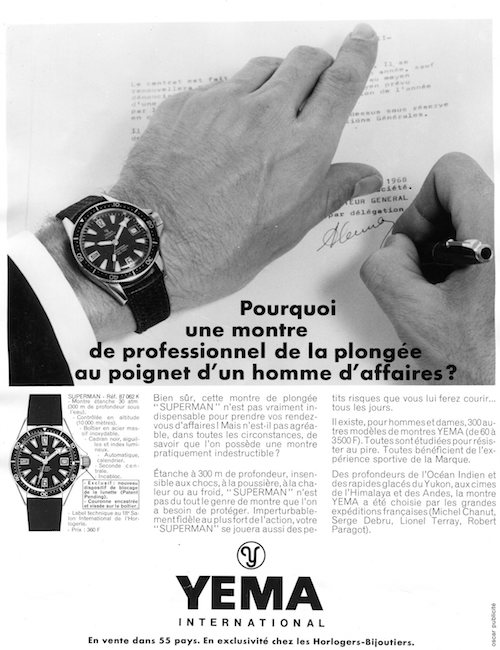
Yema Superman 1963

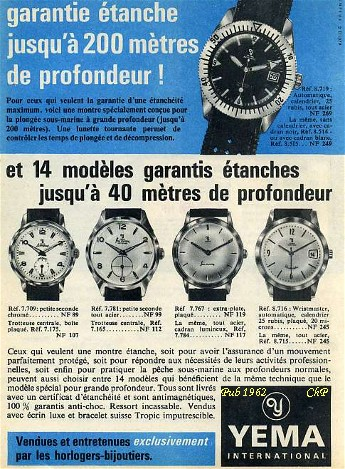
Yema 1960 collection

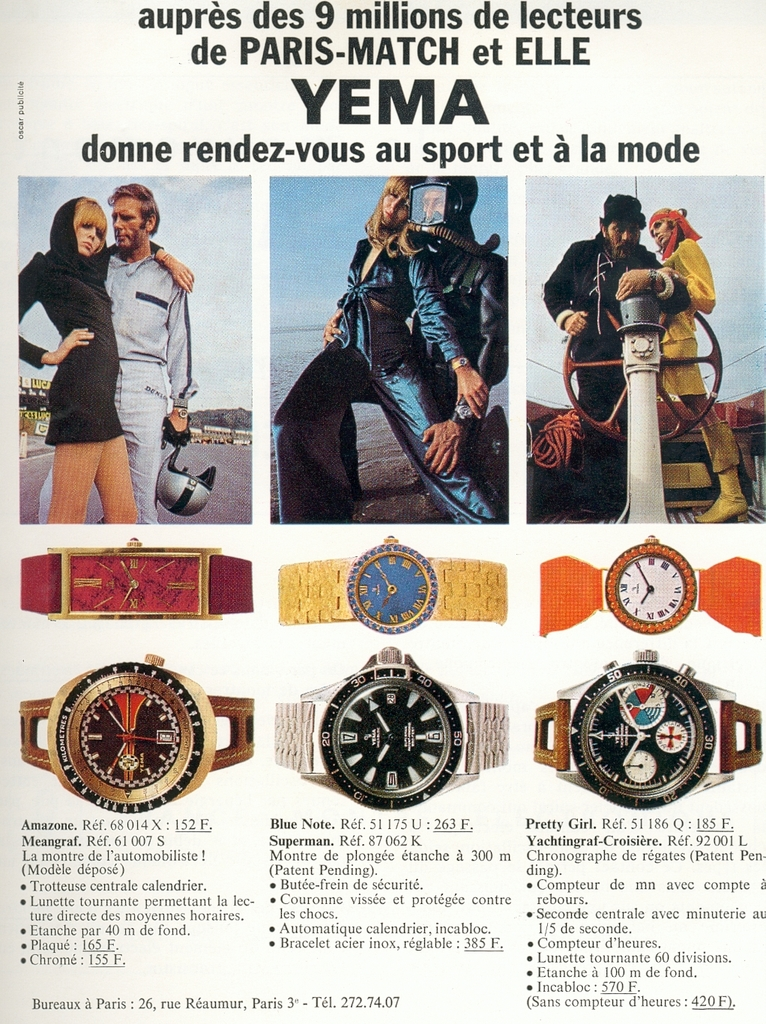
Yema collection 1963

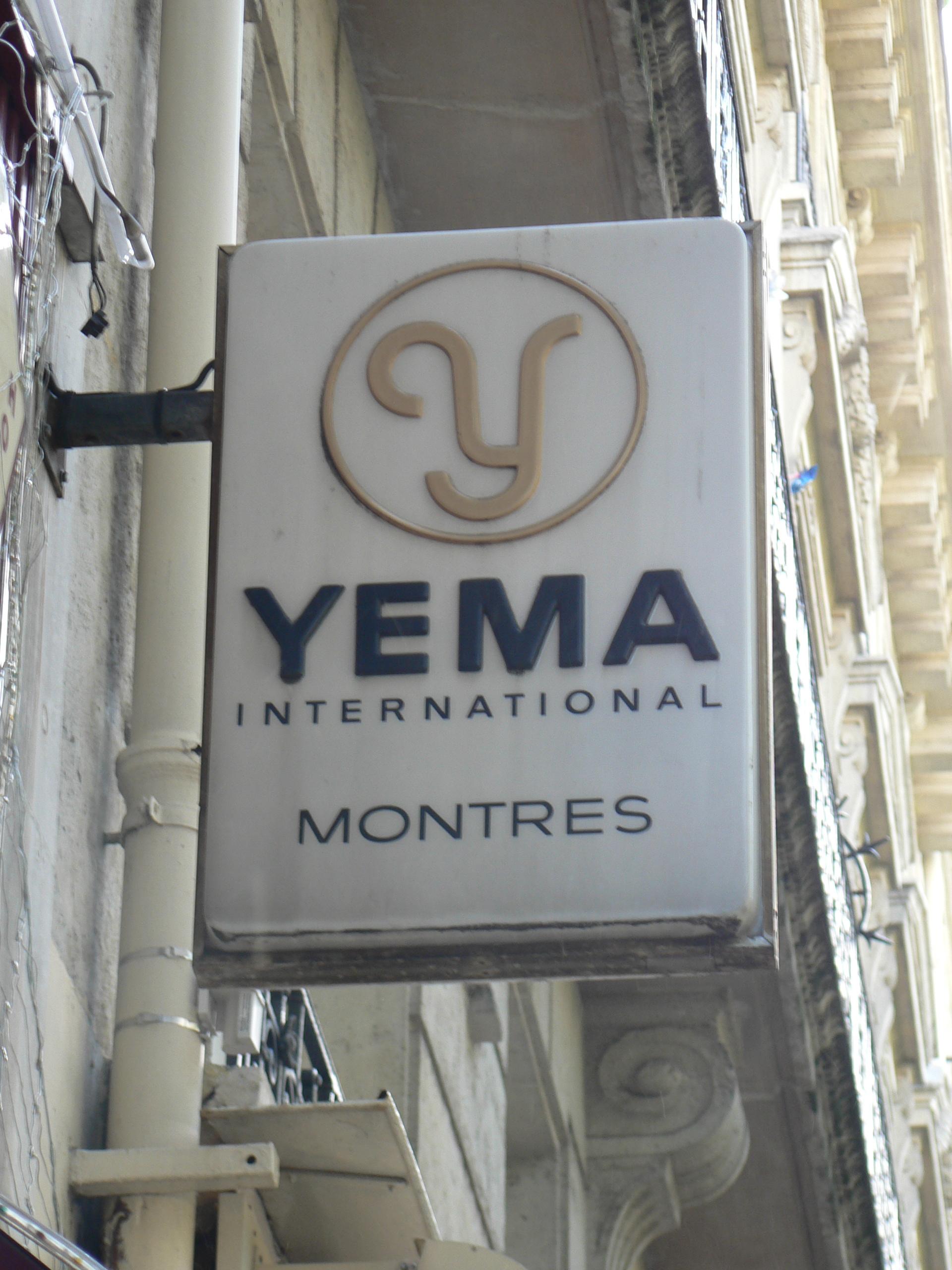
Yema original logo

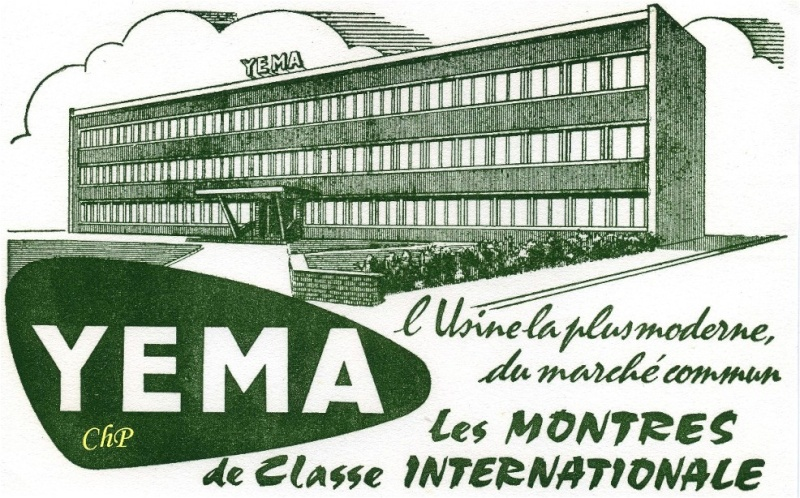
Yema factory, 1961 Besançon (France)

=== 1966 - Yema Yachtingraf collection and Yema RallyGraf collection ===
In 1966, the first Yema Yachtingraf was launched, a watch especially designed for sailors. At the same time, the first Yema RallyGraf was launched. One Yema RallyGraf was even worn by Formula One champion Mario Andretti.

At the start of 1970, Yema became an official supplier of the French Sailing Federation (Fédération Française de Yachting à Voile) and equipped the French National Sailing Team in the 1972 Olympic Games.

Six different versions of Yema Yachtingraf model were crafted over the years.

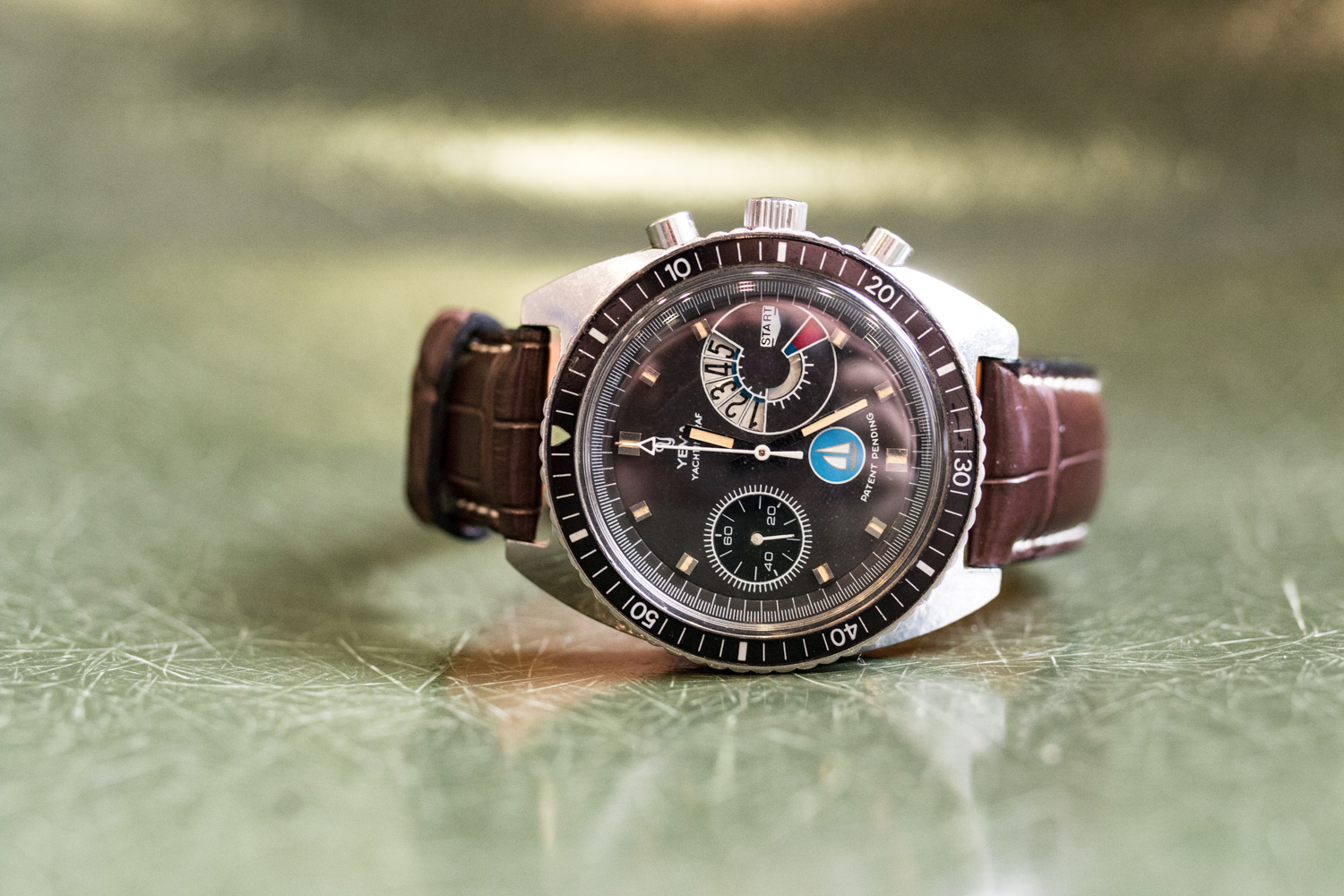
Yema Yachtingraf 1970

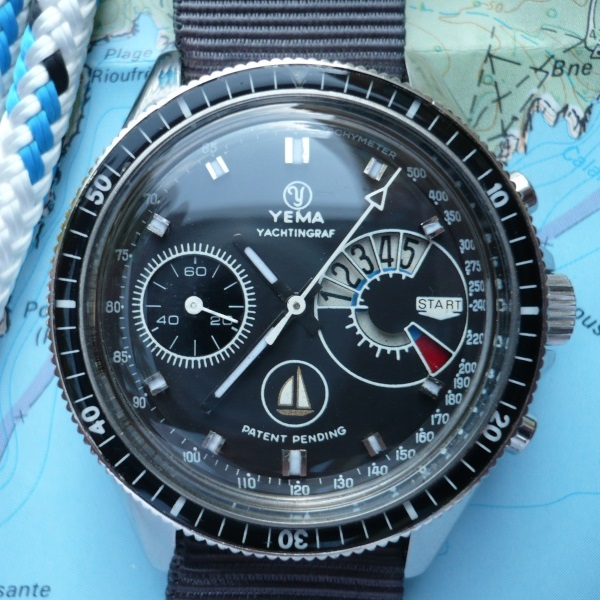
Yema Yachtingraf Regate 1970

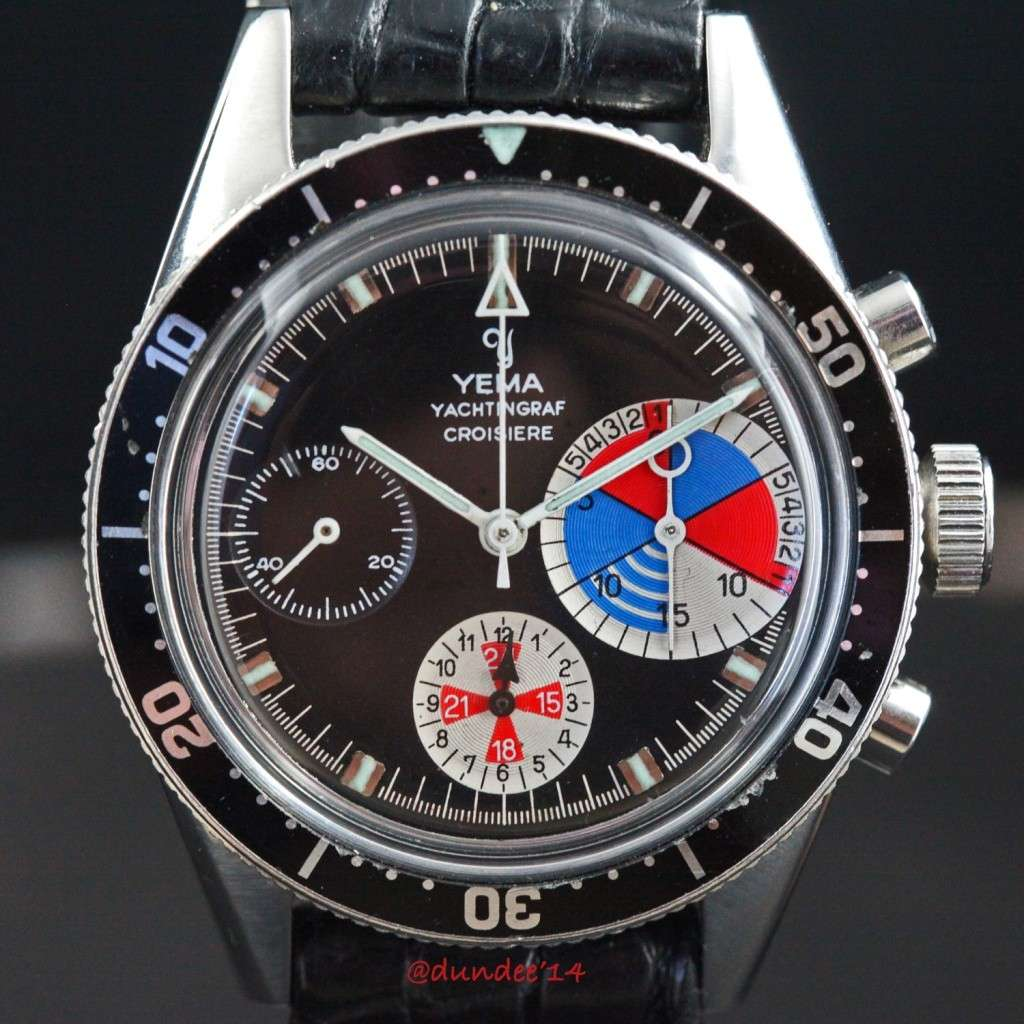
Yema Yachtingraf Croisiere 1966

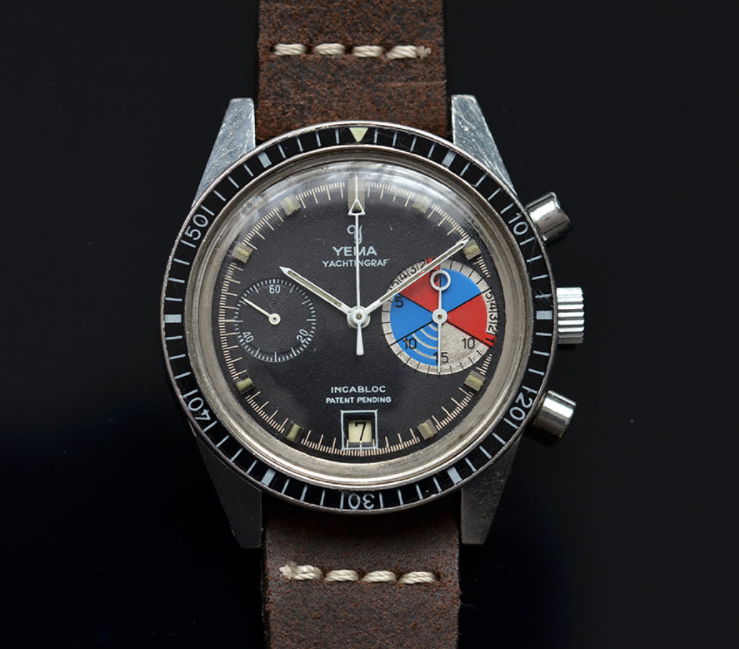
Yema Yachtingraf 1967

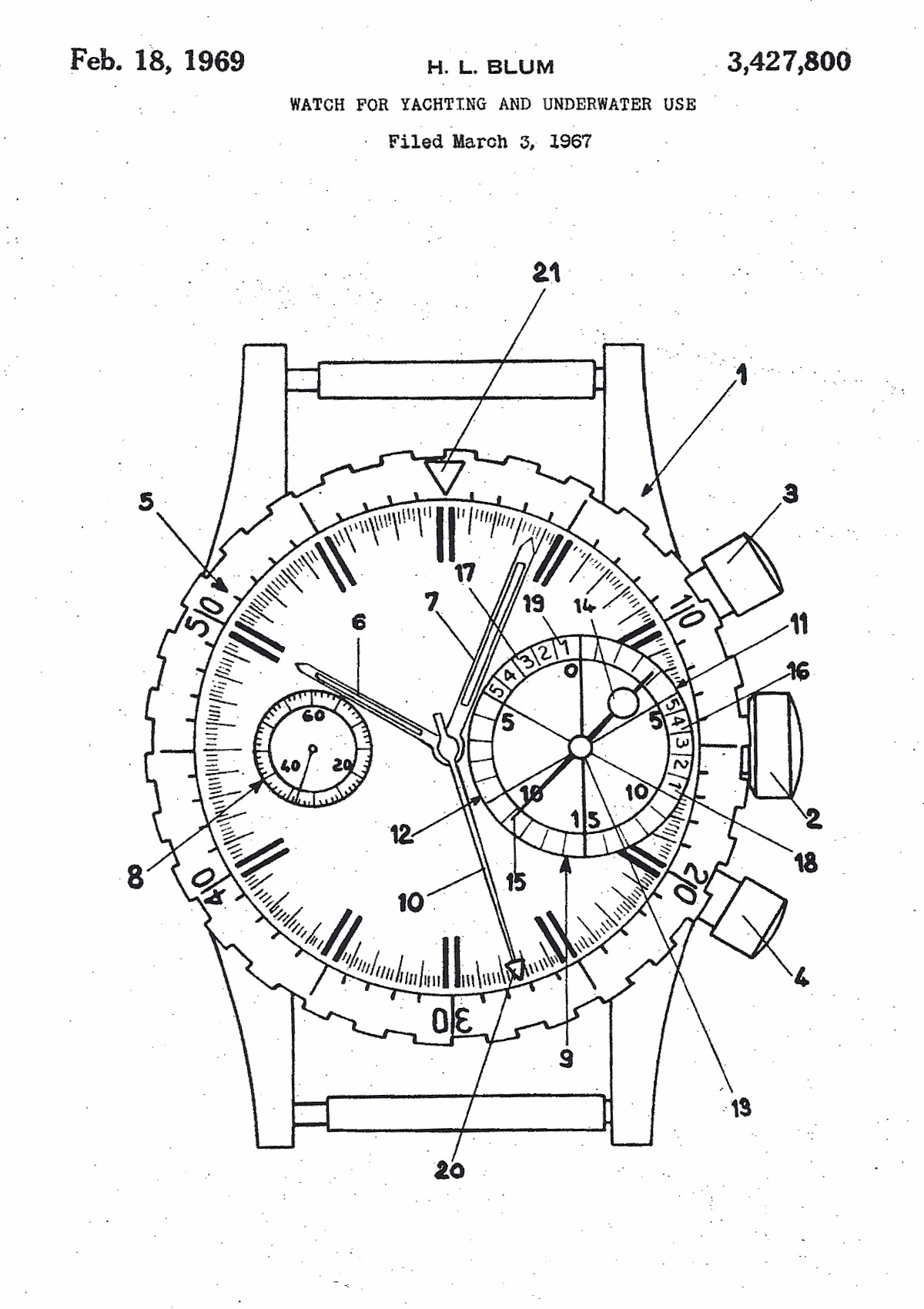
Yema Yachtingraf patent 1969

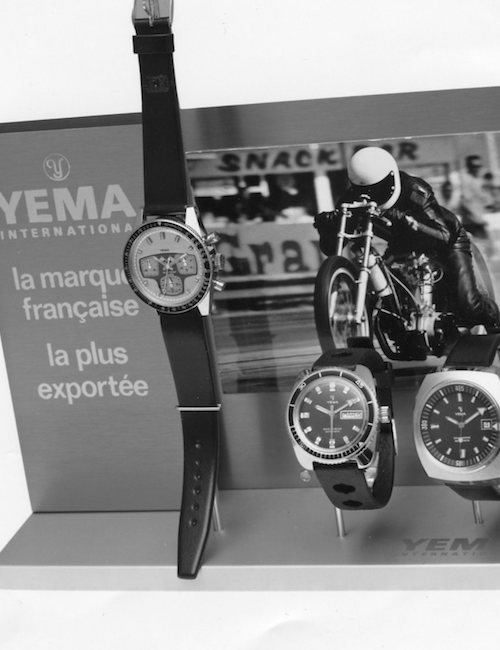
Yema Rallygraf 1966

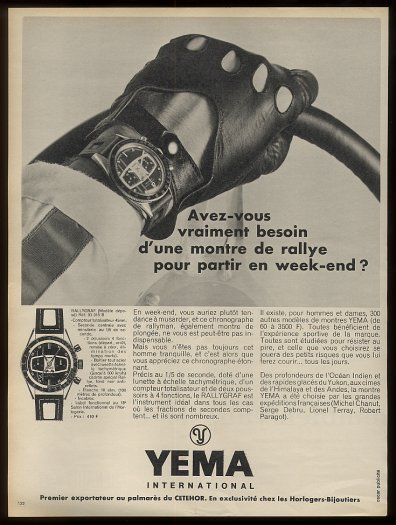
Yema Rallygraf 1970

=== 1982 - First French Watch in Space ===
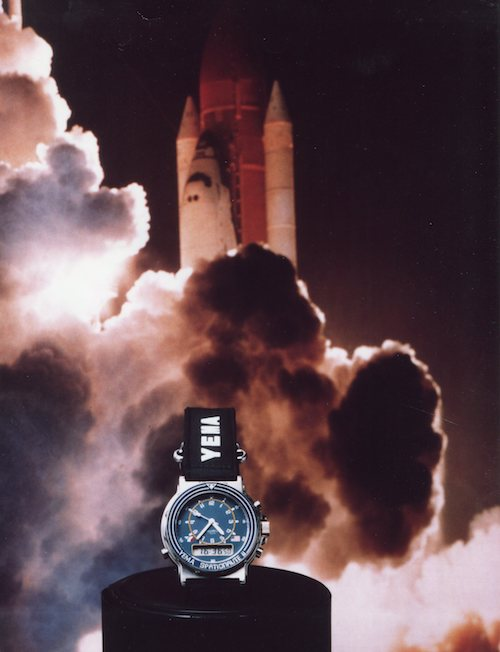
Yema Spacegraf, 1982

On 24 June 1982, French astronaut, Jean-Loup Chrétien, flew from the Baikonour base for a 10-day trip into space, wearing a Yema Spationaute I, making it the first French watch in space.

On 17 June 1985, the Discovery shuttle took off with Patrick Baudry and his Yema Spationaute II on mission STS-51G (First Franco-American Orbital Flight).

On 26 November 1988, Jean Loup Chrétien went on a mission to MIR Space Station wearing a Yema Spationaute III.

=== 1986 - North Pole Mission ===
In May 1986, Yema joined forces with French physician and explorer Jean-Louis Etienne to cross the North Pole.

=== 2009 - MBP 1000 watch movement ===
Yema designed a new proprietary watch movement: the MBP 1000. Equipped with a bidirectional oscillating mass mounted on ball bearings, they allowed a fast reassembly and a power reserve of 40 hours. This resulted in a gain of efficiency but also precision, provided by a regulator whose balance beats at a frequency of 28,800 alternations per hour. Stacking a total of 31 rubies including 2 located at the ends of the axis of the barrel, this technical design effectively reduced the friction generally observed at this element following the mechanical movements.

=== 2017 - Proxima Mission ===
In 2017, Yema partnered with CNES (the National Centre for Space Studies) to create a new model of watch, the Yema Spacegraf. This model was to honor of the Proxima mission, which sent the 10th French astronaut to space.

== Ownership ==
Over the course of its history, Yema changed several owners. In the 1980s, it was owned by Matra, which sold it to Hattori-Seiko group. In 2004, the company was acquired by Louis-Eric Beckensteiner, its executive manager. In 2009, it was acquired by its current owner, Montres Ambre, a family-owned French watchmaking and jewelry company.

== See also ==
- History of clockmaking in Besançon
