= Immigration to Besançon =

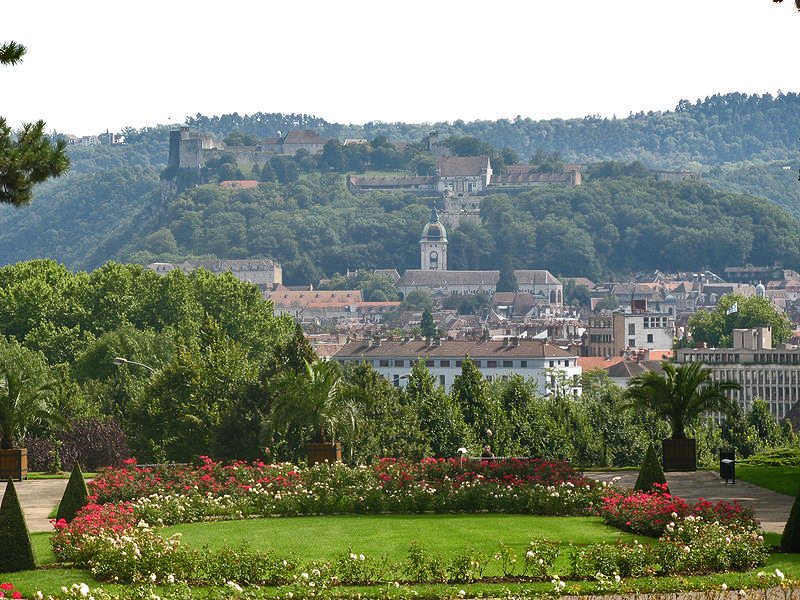
Besançon, the old town.

Immigration to Besançon refers to the settlement of individuals in the city who were not born in Besançon or its surrounding region, historically known as Franche-Comté (including the County of Burgundy, and ancient Sequania). In contemporary usage, the term generally applies to individuals who are not French nationals and who originate from countries outside of France. Historically, the earliest populations to settle in the area were the Sequani, a Gallic tribe, followed by Roman conquerors who incorporated the region into the Roman Empire. However, the first identifiable migratory community in the modern sense was the Jewish population, which established a presence in Besançon during the Middle Ages and remained there until the 19th century.

During the Renaissance, the city experienced a significant influx of Italian migrants, contributing to its cultural and architectural development. From the 18th century onward, Swiss immigrants also settled in the region, playing a key role in the establishment and growth of the local watchmaking industry. From the 1870s, soldiers from France’s colonial empire—primarily from North Africa and parts of Asia—were brought to the country to serve in the military. After World War I, and especially during the 1920s and 1930s, migration from Italy, Spain, Portugal, and Eastern Europe increased in response to labor shortages in industry. This trend continued after World War II, with significant migration from the Maghreb, the Iberian Peninsula, and Italy persisting until the 1980s, particularly to meet demand in the construction and housing sectors.

More recent waves of immigration have included individuals from Eastern Europe—especially the Balkans and former Yugoslavia—as well as from Sub-Saharan Africa and, to a lesser extent, Southeast Asia. Over time, the settlement of diverse populations has contributed to the city’s multicultural character. These migratory movements have introduced a range of cultural and religious traditions, the most longstanding of which is Judaism, followed in more recent times by Islam and Buddhism.

== History ==
The history of immigration to Besançon spans several centuries and, in a broader sense, even millennia, when accounting for the various invasions and population movements that have shaped the region. Immigration to the city has primarily occurred for two main reasons: socio-economic hardship (such as the search for employment or improved living conditions) and political instability (including war and persecution) in migrants’ countries of origin. A smaller but notable proportion of arrivals consisted of foreign soldiers stationed in the city between 1870 and 1945, many of whom eventually settled there.

=== Vesontio: Gaulish and Roman city ===
Throughout its history, Besançon has been ruled by a number of different peoples and empires. Although these occupations were primarily invasions rather than migrations in the modern sense, the presence of non-native groups significantly influenced the city’s demographic evolution, cultural identity, and architectural heritage.

In the 2nd century BCE, the site of modern-day Besançon—then an oppidum—was inhabited by the Sequani, a Gallic tribe that controlled a vast territory extending between the Rhône, Saône, Jura, and Vosges rivers. Archaeological excavations have revealed public infrastructure dating from this period, including remnants uncovered in 2001 during preventive excavations near the former city ramparts. The city was encircled by a murus gallicus, a type of Gallic defensive wall, remnants of which were also discovered at the site. Known in Latin as Vesontio, the city was an economic center of Sequania and a strategic target for various groups, including the Germani and the Aedui prior to its conquest by Julius Caesar in 58 BC. The Battle of Vesontio marked the city's incorporation into the Roman Empire, establishing early contact with the Italian peninsula. One of the earliest written records of Vesontio appears in Caesar’s Commentarii de Bello Gallico, where the city is mentioned. Under Roman rule, the city flourished, as demonstrated by surviving monuments such as the Porte Noire, the aqueduct of Besançon-Arcier, which passes through the Porte Taillée and ends at Square Castan, and the remains of the amphitheater.

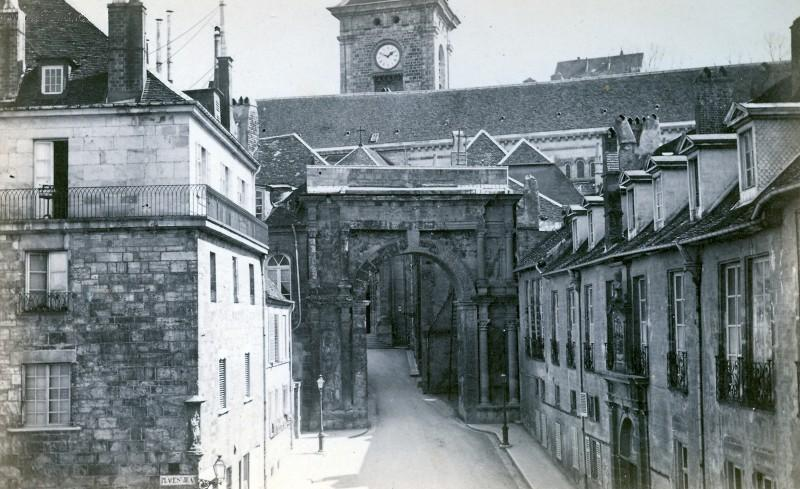
The ancient amphitheatre.

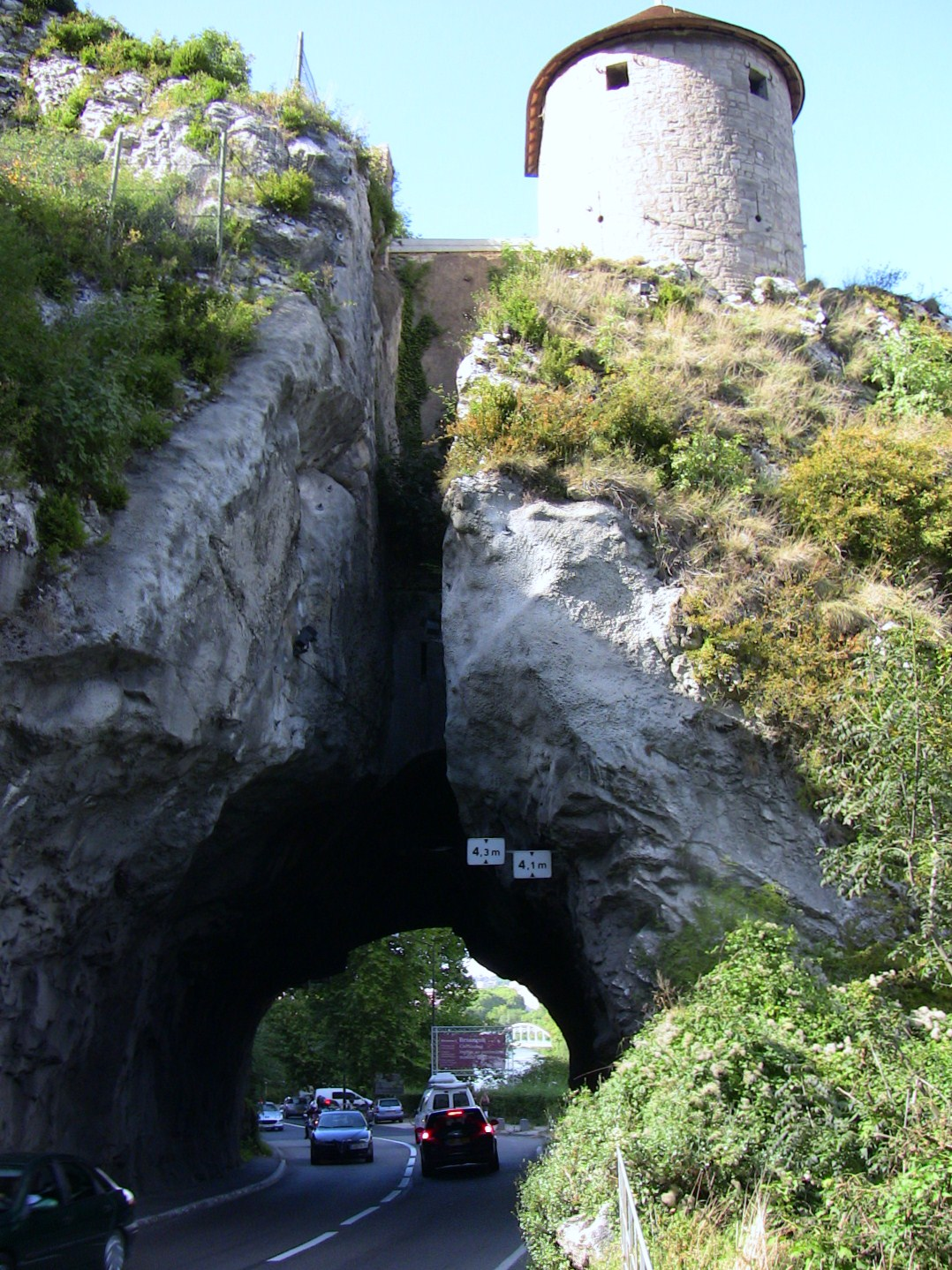
The carved door.

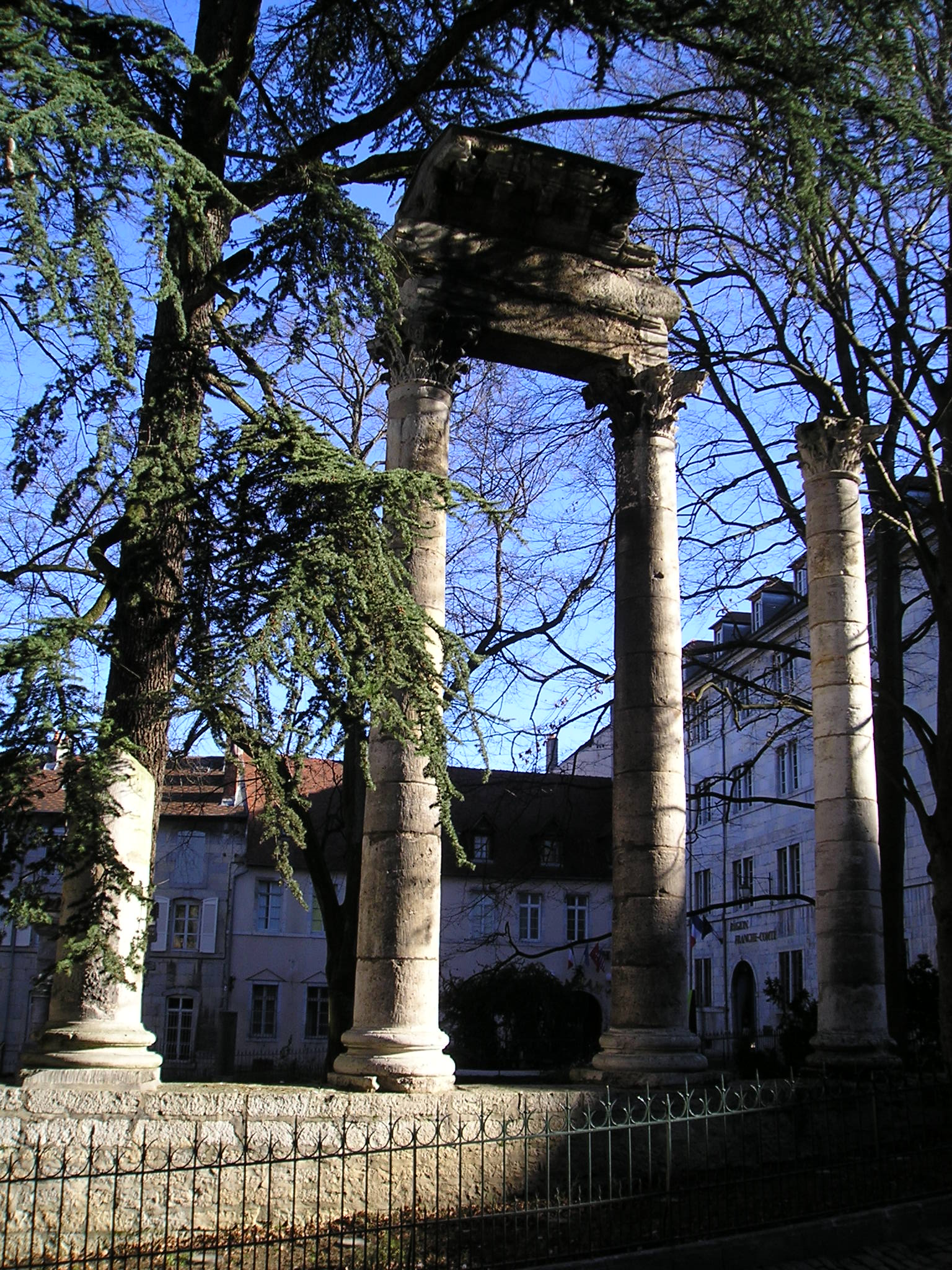
Castan Square.

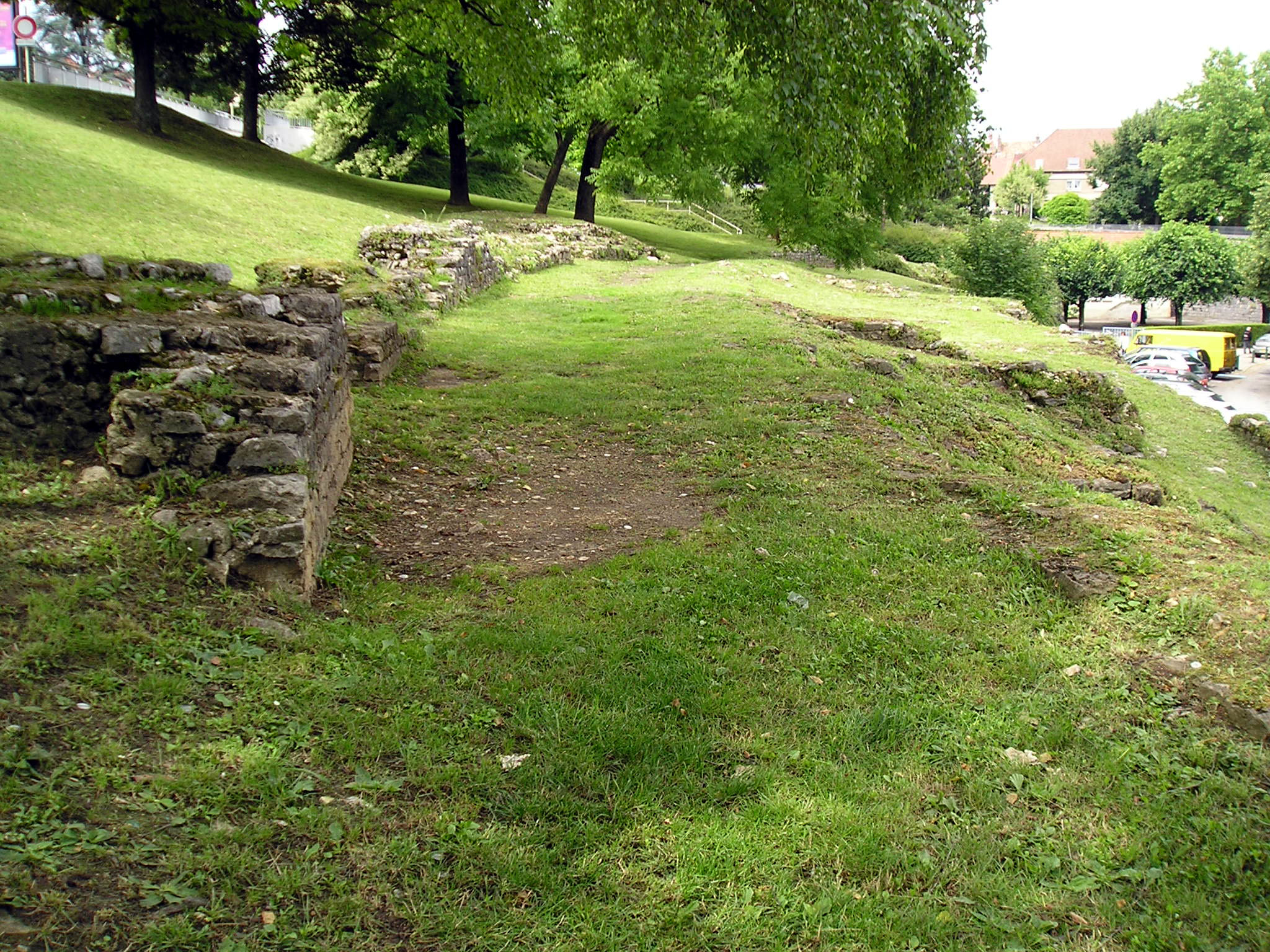
The old arena.

=== Jewish settlement ===
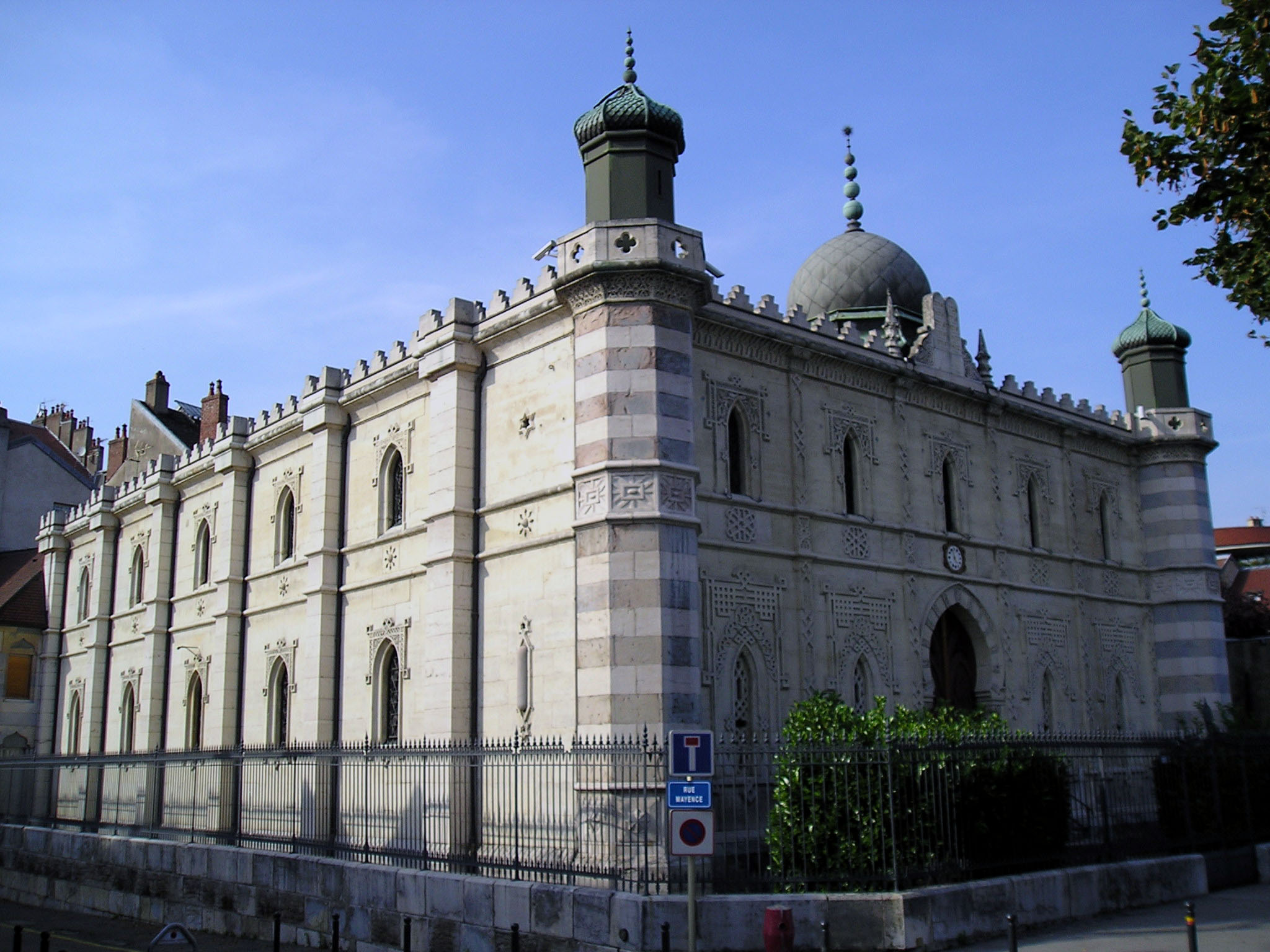
The Besançon Synagogue, built in 1869, symbolizes the historical significance of the Jewish community.

The first identifiable migratory community to settle in Besançon in a non-military context was the Jewish population. The city’s geographical position between Germany and Italy made it an important center of trade, attracting many Jewish merchants who frequently passed through. The presence of a Jewish community is confirmed by a letter sent in 1245 by Pope Innocent IV to the Archbishop of Besançon, instructing him to enforce the wearing of the rouelle, a badge identifying Jews. In the 14th century, the municipal authorities of Besançon granted Jews permission to reside in the city in exchange for a droit d’entrage (entry fee) and an annual cens (tax). By 1393, records indicate the presence of twelve Jewish families, who maintained a school under the leadership of Joseph de Trèves. In 1394, a local citizen was fined 60 sous for assaulting a Jewish man who was guarding the town, indicating that some members of the community held roles in local defense or civic functions. During the mid-14th century, some Jews fled to Besançon from other parts of France to escape persecution following the widespread antisemitic belief in the so-called "lepers' plot", a conspiracy theory alleging that Jews had conspired with lepers and the Muslim kingdom of Granada to poison water wells. That same year, King Charles VI of France expelled Jews from the royal domains, and Duke Philip the Bold (Philippe le Hardi) enacted similar measures in the Duchy of Burgundy. However, Besançon, as a Free Imperial City of the Holy Roman Empire, was not subject to these decrees. As a result, it became a refuge for Jews expelled from neighboring territories, contributing to the growth of the local Jewish population.

=== Italian Renaissance and Swiss arrivals ===
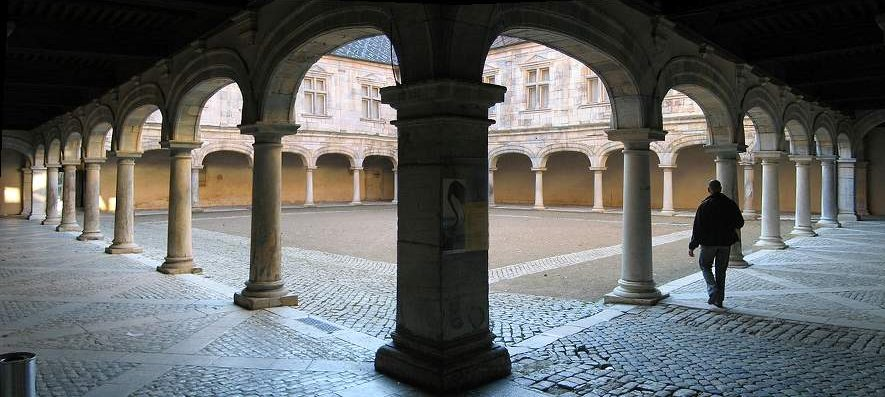
The courtyard of the Palais Granvelle.

Relations between Besançon and the Italian Peninsula resumed in the 16th century, during the Renaissance, a period of significant cultural and economic influence in transalpine territories. The presence of Genoese merchants in the city is attested from 1535, following their expulsion from Lyon and Chambéry. These merchants established a trade fair in Besançon, attracting moneychangers and other traders for a period of time. However, the city eventually proved economically unviable and difficult to access, leading to a gradual decline in Italian presence. A notable architectural legacy of this era is the Palais Granvelle, considered a Renaissance masterpiece.

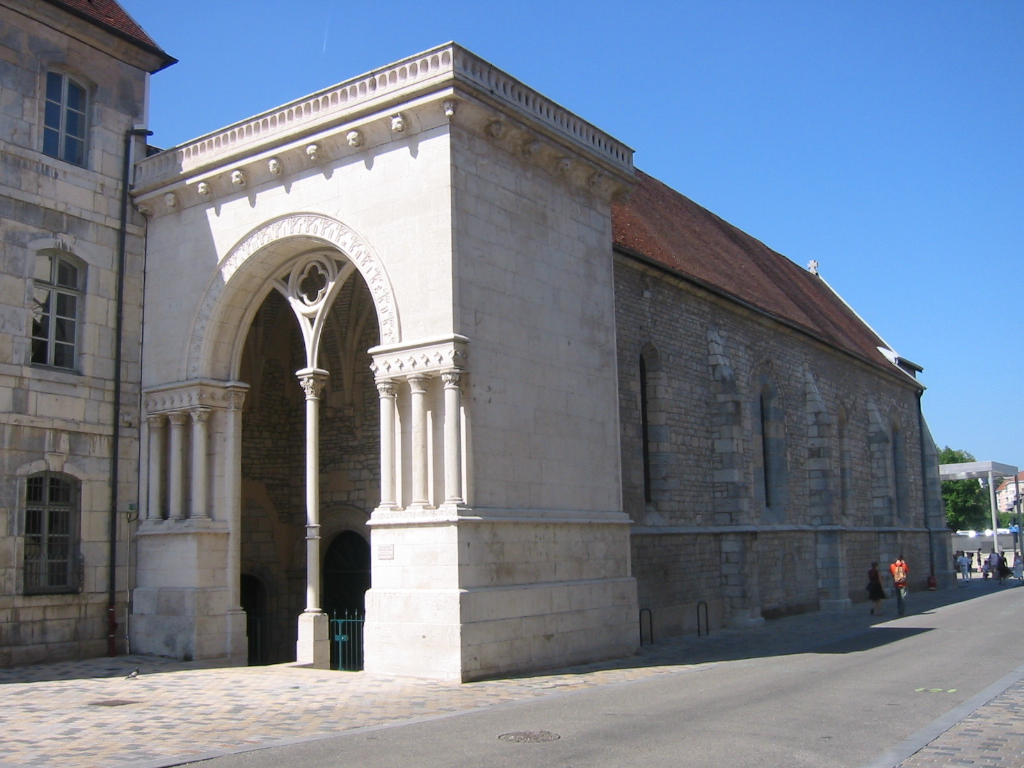
The Protestant Temple of the Holy Spirit.

Beginning in the 16th century, Protestantism appeared in the city, likely introduced by immigrants from Switzerland and the Principality of Montbéliard. While initially met with hostility, Protestant communities gradually gained acceptance due in part to the contributions of Swiss Calvinists watchmakers, who helped establish the watchmaking industry in Franche-Comté. Protestant worship spaces were progressively granted, including the Refuge Chapel, the former Capuchin Chapel (later known as the Chamars Temple), and eventually the Church of the Holy Spirit. In 1793, Laurent Mégevand (1754–1814) of Geneva, accompanied by around 80 colleagues, settled in Besançon and formally founded its watchmaking industry. This initiative brought 22 additional watchmaking families to the city, numbering between 400 and 700 individuals. By the end of the First French Empire, there were approximately 1,500 Swiss nationals in Besançon, 500 of whom were exclusively employed in watchmaking. Over time, this workforce was increasingly replaced by local labor.

=== From the 1850s to World War I ===
From the 1850s onward, Besançon experienced its first significant wave of mass immigration, largely driven by economic growth and industrial development. Initially dominated by Swiss immigrants, the foreign population soon included a growing number of Italians, who by the late 19th century had become the city's largest foreign community. The 1846 census reported that the majority of foreigners in the city were of Italian, German, or Swiss origin (particularly from Neuchâtel), with generally neutral or mildly strained relations with the local population. Historical records, such as Claude Fohlen's Histoire de Besançon, reference the employment of Piedmontese laborers in major construction projects, including the 1850 development of a canal to supply water from the Arcier springs. The 1851 census recorded approximately 300 residents from Savoy and 96 Italians in the city (335 in the department). The Italian community, primarily from Piedmont, Lombardy, and, to a lesser extent, Liguria, was largely composed of young, male, working-class migrants who frequently moved for seasonal labor. Meanwhile, Italian merchants, street vendors, and artists, typical of earlier migratory trends, continued to settle in the city.

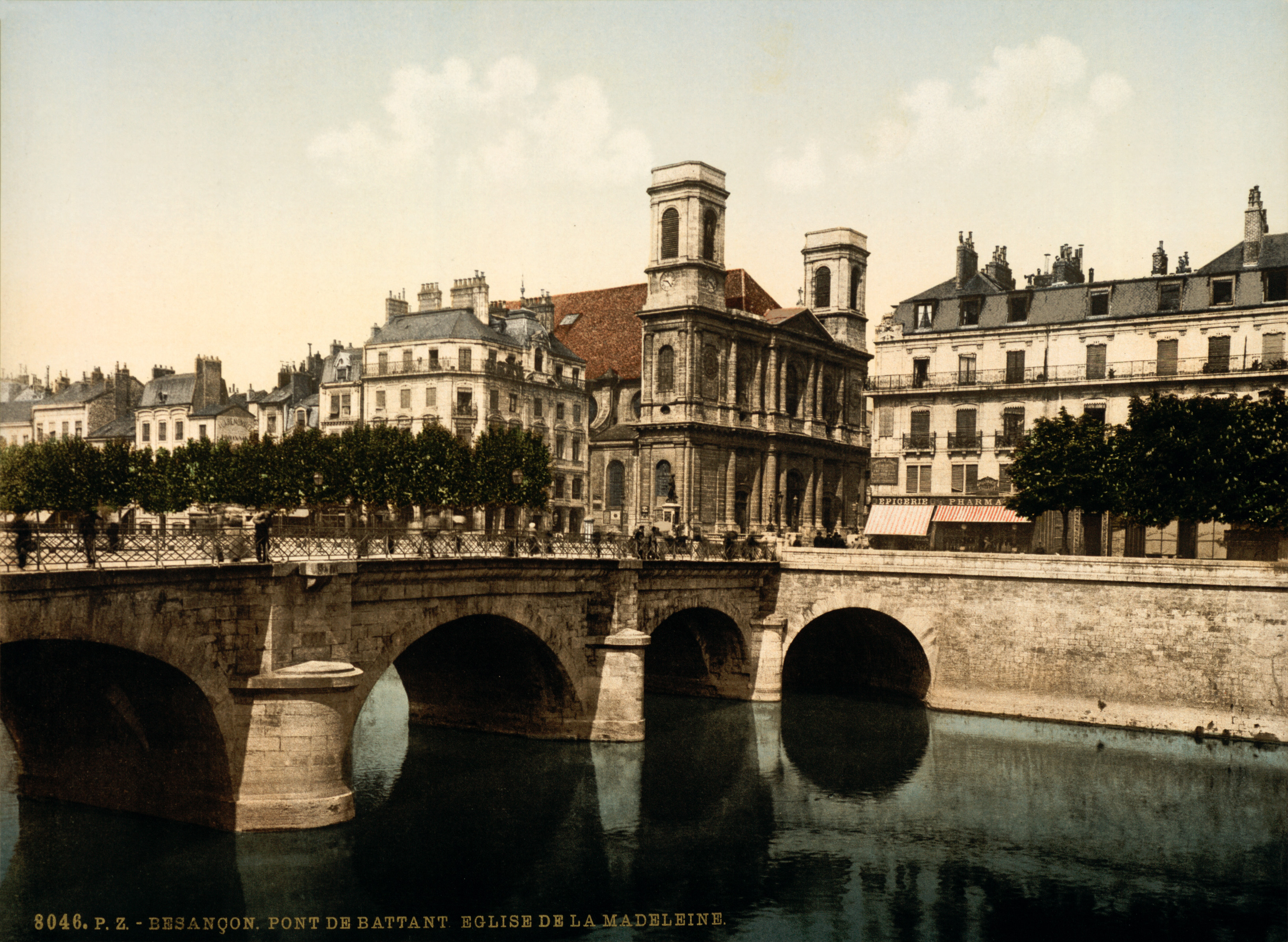
The Battant quarter in 1896, a hub for Italian immigrants.

Notable Italian residents included Gaétan Migon, a restaurateur whose establishment was visited by Honoré de Balzac in 1833; Roncaglio, an organist at Saint-Pierre Church and later Saint-Jean Cathedral (1780–1864); and the painter Jean-Baptiste Franceschi (1795–1881) along with his sculptor sons. In 1872, Besançon hosted its first foreign consulate—an Italian consulate—followed by a Swiss consulate in 1874. Only the latter remains operational. By the time of the Franco-Prussian War of 1870 and the Paris Commune, the city had a diverse foreign population including Italians, Swiss, Austro-Germans, a few Russians, and religious figures from the Near East. The 1876 census recorded 166 Italians in the city, primarily employed in construction and public works; this number exceeded 200 by 1888, with the majority residing in the Battant district, particularly on Petit Charmont, Grand Charmont, and Richebourg streets.

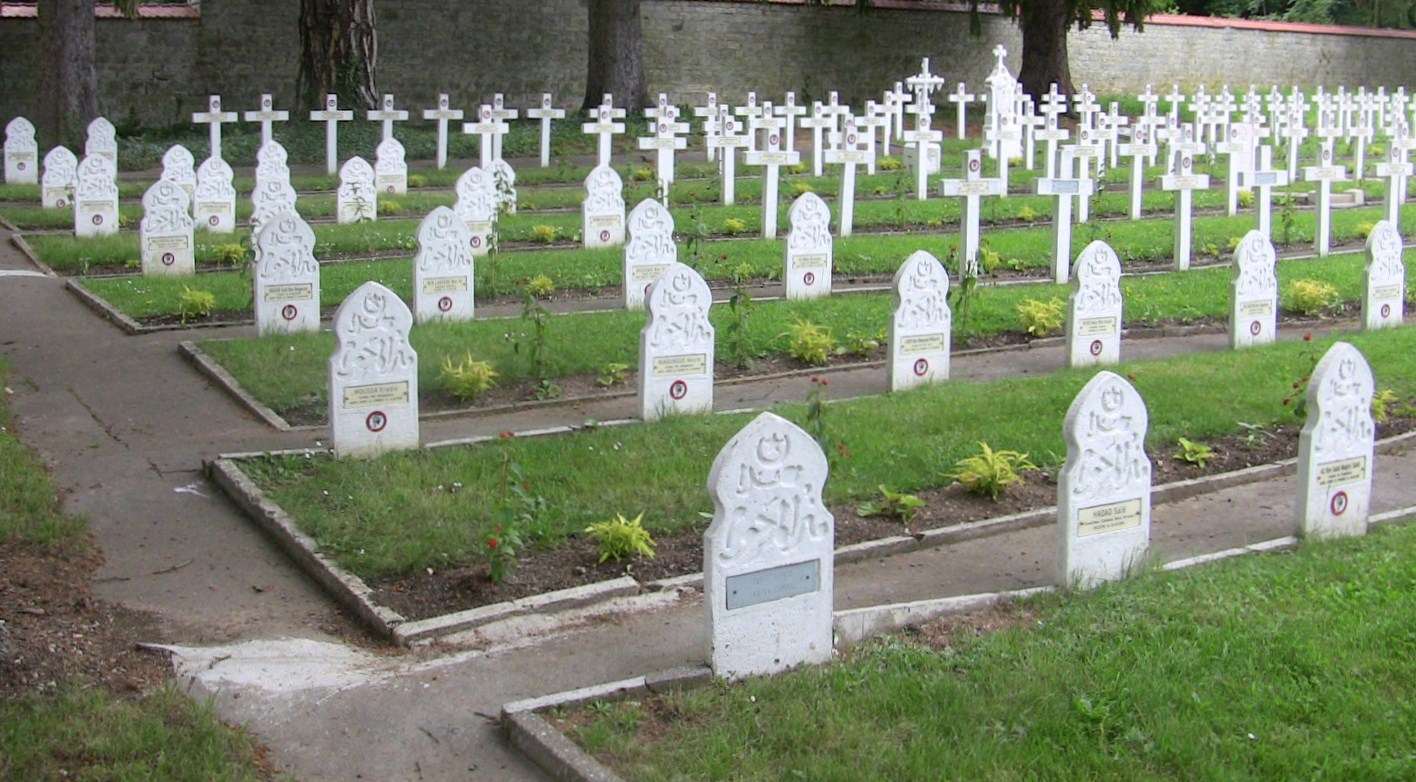
Muslim section of the Saint-Claude cemetery, Besançon.

Following the defeat of the Second French Empire in 1871, France began preparations for military revanche in the 1890s, relying increasingly on manpower from its colonial empire. Soldiers from North Africa and Indochina were conscripted and stationed across Franche-Comté, including Besançon. The participation of Muslim soldiers during World War I is commemorated in the Saint-Claude Cemetery, which contains a Muslim section with approximately 20 oriental stelae in memory of fallen colonial soldiers. While colonial presence in the city before World War II was relatively limited, it became more pronounced during the conflict, when indigenous colonial armies were actively deployed in the region.

Tensions between French and Italian workers surfaced in the 1890s, mirroring broader national sentiments. In March 1890, labor disputes broke out during the construction of a paper mill in the Prés-de-Vaux area. The local newspaper Le Petit Comtois reported the next day that Italians were no longer being hired, a decision welcomed by French workers. Nonetheless, Besançon began to lose its economic appeal. A 1889 survey showed that foreign workers increasingly preferred industrial hubs such as Pontarlier, Morteau, Montbéliard, and the Territoire de Belfort. According to the 1896 census, the number of Italians in Besançon had slightly declined, though it remained above 200. Department-wide, there were 1,663 Italians. In 1911, this number rose to 2,467 Italians and 7,843 Swiss in the department, but the onset of World War I in 1914 made life more precarious for foreign residents.

A significant anti-immigrant episode occurred following the laying of the foundation stone for the Besançon-les-Bains hotel. Italian workers criticized the poor quality of imported materials, leading to tensions. On 22 September 1891, a crowd of 1,500 demonstrators gathered at city hall to demand the replacement of Italian workers with French laborers. The protest was widely covered in the local press, with headlines such as "Too many foreigners" and "Too many enemies being made to live at the expense of our compatriots." Ultimately, the Italian workers were dismissed and replaced by locals. This episode is conspicuously absent from Gaston Coindre’s Mon vieux Besançon, written between 1900 and 1912, which otherwise offers a detailed chronicle of city life during that era.

The city’s Jewish population was also affected by World War I. A war memorial at the entrance to the Jewish cemetery commemorates members of the community who died in the conflict. The monument bears the inscription: "Ah! our youth! our pride... oh! how the heroes have fallen!" (II Samuel 1:19), along with a French remembrance medallion. The names of twenty fallen soldiers are engraved on the memorial.

=== Post-World War I ===
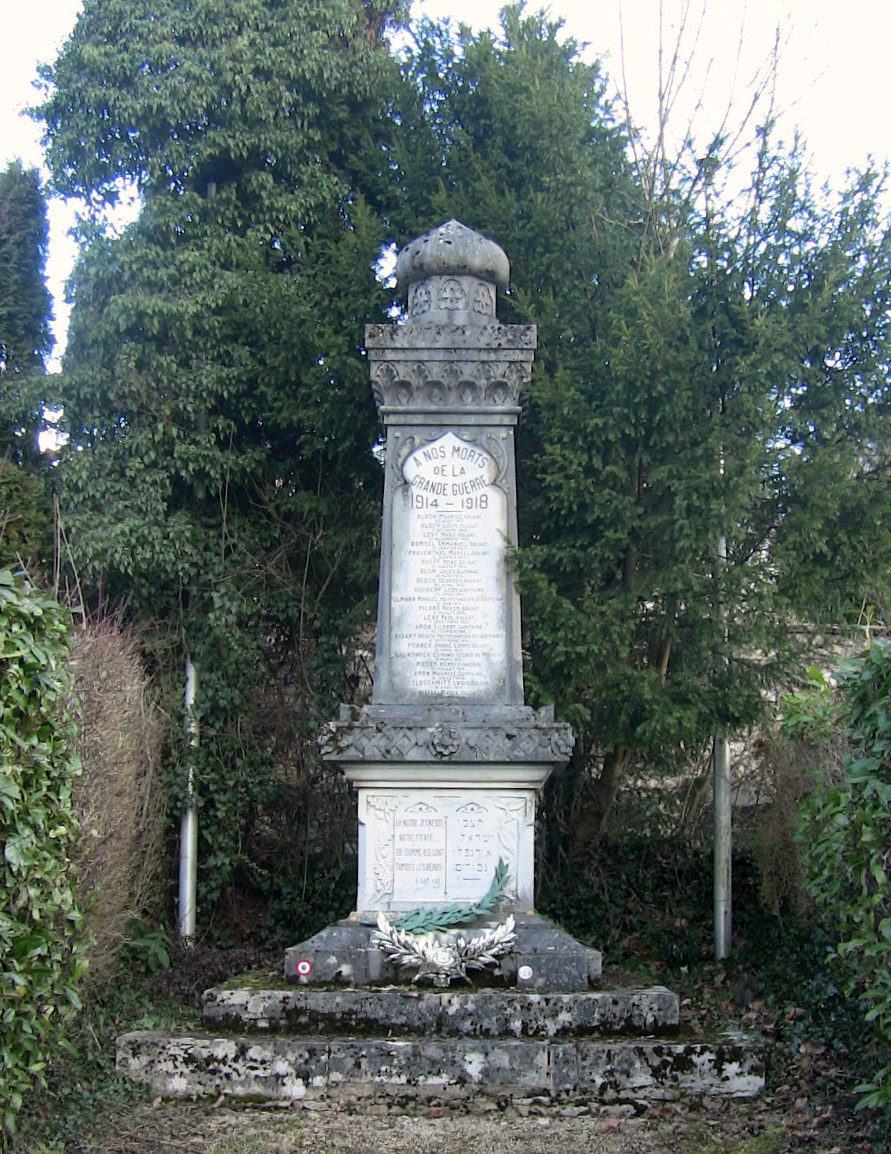
The war memorial at the Jewish cemetery, Besançon.

After World War I, experienced an economic downturn, particularly due to the weakening of the watchmaking industry. The city then diversified into other sectors such as textiles, metallurgy, food processing, and paper and cardboard manufacturing. From the 1920s onward, the city saw modest population growth, increasing by 17% between 1921 and 1936, from 55,652 to 65,022 inhabitants. By 1936, the foreign population included 1,352 Italians and 1,103 Swiss, alongside newer arrivals such as Spanish Republicans and refugees from Eastern Europe and the territories of the former Soviet Union. A new wave of Jewish immigrants, primarily from Germany, Austria, Poland, and Central Europe, also settled in Besançon, fleeing the rise of antisemitism in their home countries. By 1934, the city was home to approximately 2,500 immigrants, many of them recent arrivals. Immigration increased again in 1939, following the Anschluss and the beginning of the Allies' involvement in the Axis conflict. Toward the end of the 1930s, the city witnessed renewed hostility toward foreigners, particularly those from countries whose governments had diverged from French policy. Among those targeted were Spaniards, Czechs, and Italians, the latter of whom were subject to anti-Italian demonstrations in 1938 and 1940. Despite this, many immigrants gradually integrated into the city, as was the case with the Italian community, which later facilitated the arrival of family and acquaintances during the postwar economic boom known as the Trente Glorieuses.

In 1936, there were 3,212 foreign nationals living in Besançon, out of a total population of 56,491—approximately 5.7% of the population. This included 1,352 Italians (nearly half of the foreign population), 1,103 Swiss, 156 Poles, and smaller numbers from other nationalities. Since at least 1931, Italians had formed the largest foreign community in both the city and the Doubs department, where 7,990 Italian nationals were recorded. Within Besançon, the Italian community was primarily concentrated in the Battant district, especially west of rue de Madeleine, from quai Veil Picard to Fort Griffon and avenue Siffert, as well as in rue du Petit Charmont, rue du Grand Charmont, and rue Richebourg, where 579 of the city's 689 foreigners resided. Italians were also present in other parts of the city, including the city center, though in smaller numbers. Most members of this community reported working in the construction industry. The late 1930s proved more challenging for the Italian community in Besançon as the Second World War approached. Several Fascist-linked associations and groups were established, including the Association of Italian Veterans, the Il Circolo sports club, and the Union Populaire Italienne (UPI), which had 21 branches in the Doubs department and one in Besançon. Despite support from Rome, these organizations remained small and failed to gain significant influence or lasting presence.

Following the political tensions between France and Italy in November 1938—arising from Italy’s claims on Savoy, Nice, Corsica, and Djibouti, several anti-Italian demonstrations took place in Besançon. In December 1938, approximately 300 university students, along with some high school and college pupils, demonstrated against Benito Mussolini's territorial claims. In response, the UPI distanced itself from Mussolini's position and expressed support for the French Republic. Tensions escalated further when France and Italy entered the war in June 1940. Another demonstration was held in Place Saint-Pierre, where slogans such as "Mussolini's toilet" were chanted in the city center. The demonstration was widely supported by the local population, and the UPI once again aligned itself with the French position, as it had done in 1938.

=== World War II ===
In January 1939, approximately 1,350 Spanish refugees arrived in Besançon, fleeing the authoritarian National Catholic regime of General Francisco Franco. In response to xenophobic and racist reactions, Maurice Dubourg addressed his congregation, urging compassion and solidarity with the refugees:

Why is it that some people don't seem to understand these gestures of kindness that unite people of different opinions and backgrounds in a spirit of charity? They say that these refugees are not interesting, that they do not deserve our pity, and that it is a bad deed to help the enemies of the social order. Is it possible that such pagan considerations find credence among Catholics? (...) As the representative of our divine Savior, who came to earth to preach goodness and forgiveness of offenses, we must raise the most indignant of protests against such remarks, and condemn them severely. (...) Ah, dear faithful of Besançon, We implore you, do not harden your hearts, do not let yourselves be won over by this pagan spirit which tends to penetrate everywhere and of which you could one day be in your turn the painful victims.

The Jewish population of Besançon, like elsewhere in France, was targeted by the German occupation and the Vichy regime. During this period, 82 people from Besançon were deported—approximately 40 of them Jewish—as well as 302 individuals from the Doubs department, including 102 Jews.

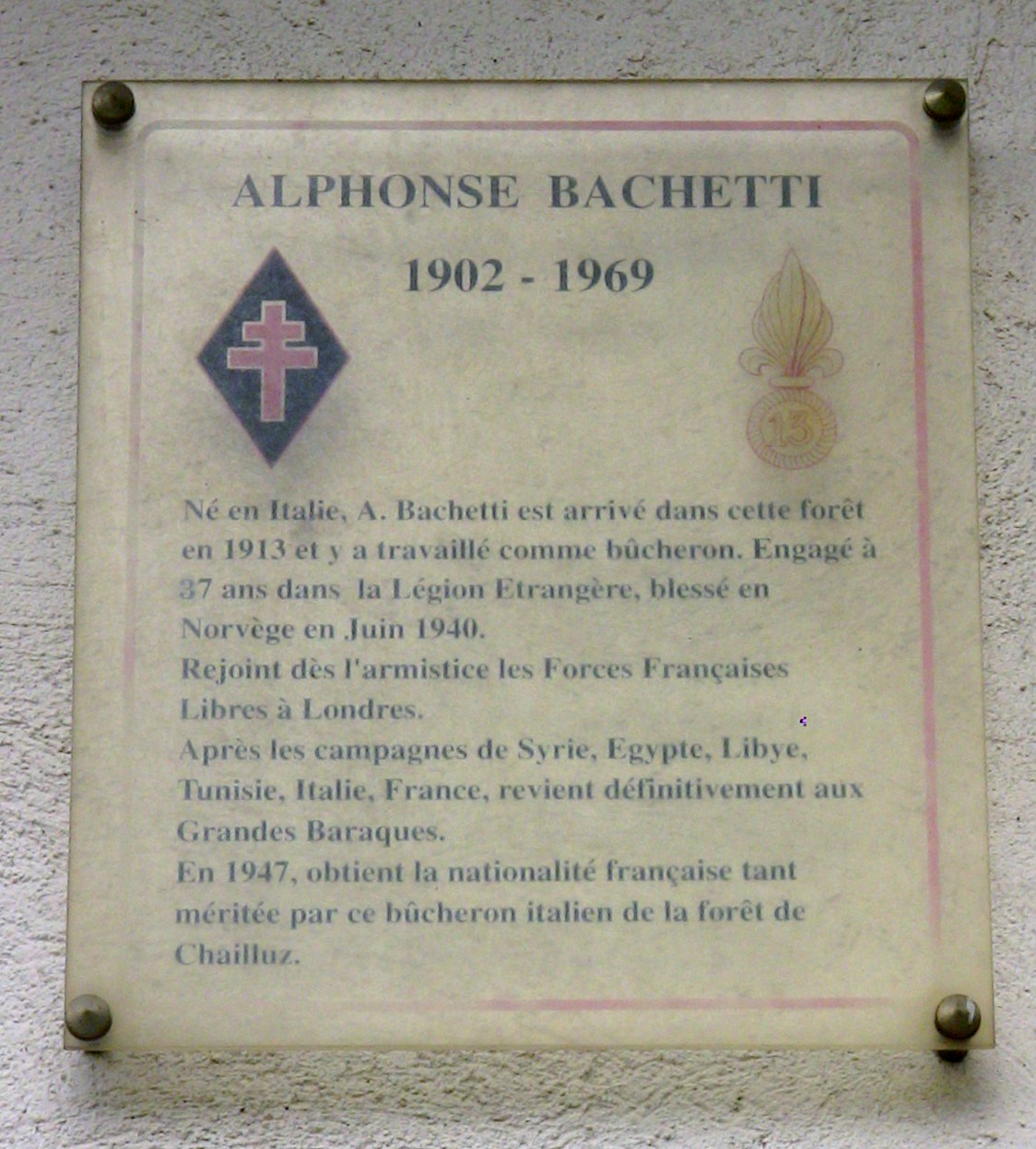
Memorial plaque for Alphonse Bachetti in the Chailluz Forest.

Several residents of Italian origin joined the Resistance. Among them was Pierre Mosini, son of a Piedmontese immigrant who had settled near Besançon in 1897. A fervent French patriot, Mosini saw two of his sons taken as prisoners of war, while the other four became members of the Resistance. Across the Doubs, numerous individuals of Italian descent—including members of the Lana, Bencetri, Gualdi, Caverzacio, Pintucci, Socié-Lorenzjni, Piova, and Minazzi families—played roles in the Resistance and in the reorganization of the French Communist Party. In Besançon, Alphonse Bachetti, born in Italy in 1902 and naturalized in 1947, also participated actively. A lumberjack in the Chailluz forest, he joined the Foreign Legion in 1939, took part in the Norwegian campaign in 1940, and later fought with the Free French Forces in Syria, Egypt, Tunisia, Italy, and France. He lived in Besançon until his death in 1969; a commemorative plaque in the Grandes Baraques honors his contribution.

Resistance efforts also included individuals of Spanish and Swiss origin. The Molard brothers, of Spanish heritage, were involved in several resistance actions in Besançon before their arrest and execution at the Besançon citadel, on September 26, 1943, along with 14 others. Swiss-born André Montavon, born in 1919, studied in Besançon and joined the Resistance in 1940. He participated in at least sixteen operations and published a diary before being arrested on June 10, 1943. He avoided execution due to his Swiss citizenship, as he was detained with the aim of being exchanged for German prisoners held in Switzerland. Montavon survived several internments in concentration camps and was liberated at the end of the war.

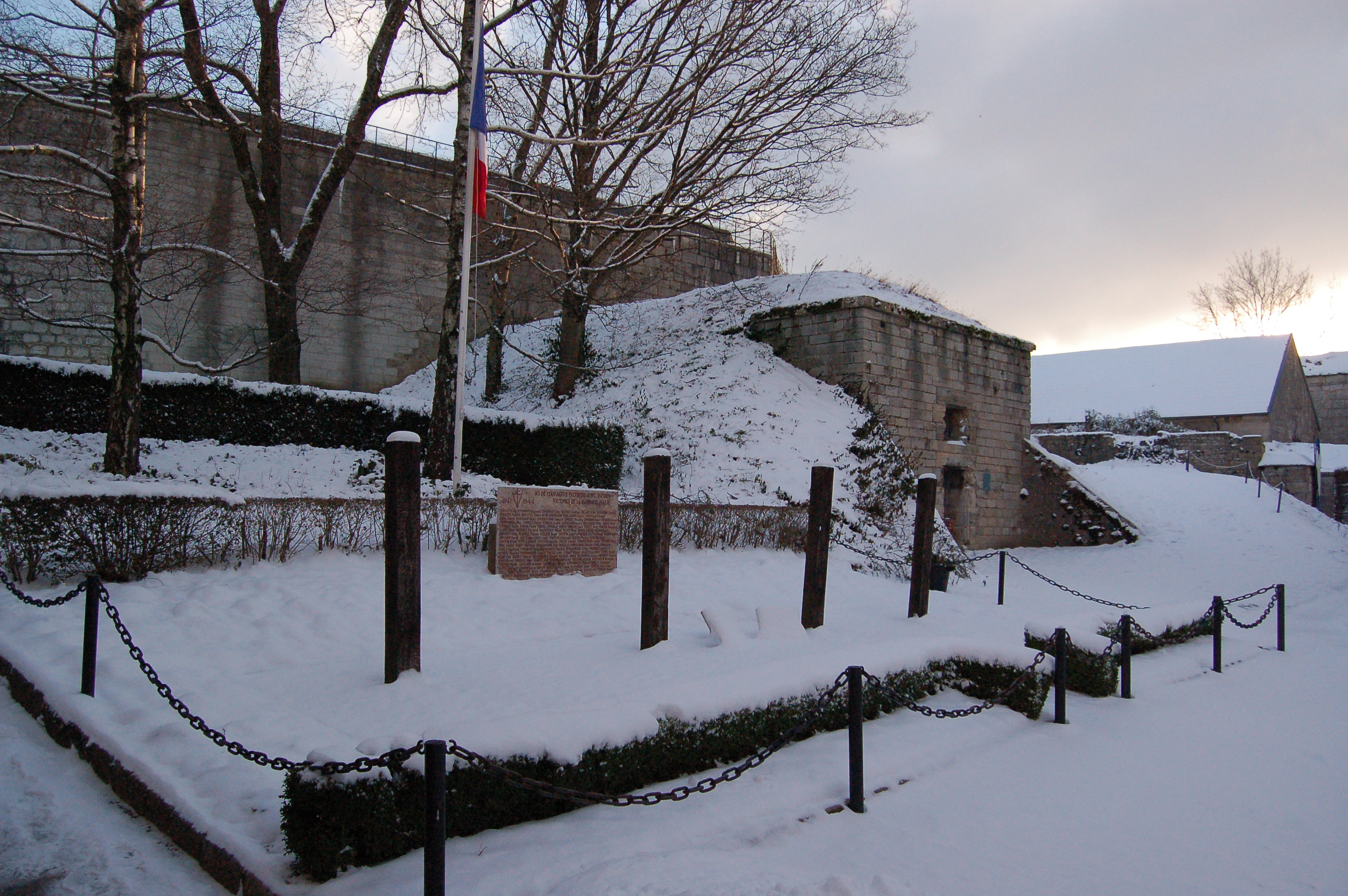
Execution posts at the Citadel of Besançon, where many foreign Resistance fighters were killed.

Two Luxembourgers, Marcel Servé and Pierre Engels also took part in the Resistance. Servé worked as a liaison and helped smuggle French escapees and Luxembourg draft evaders to England. He was sentenced to death on June 2, 1942, and executed at the Besançon Citadel three days later. Engels, who had joined the French army before May 1940, was captured and escaped, later joining the Resistance in the Jura. Arrested again in 1944, he was executed on June 23, 1944. Both men were posthumously named Chevalier de la Légion d'Honneur.

A commemorative plaque near the Besançon casino honors soldiers of the 1st French Army who fought in the Doubs region, many of whom were colonial troops. The Rougemont military cemetery contains 2,169 graves of French servicemen who died during World War II, including 1,251 with Muslim headstones. Additional Muslim graves are located in the Saint-Claude and Saint-Ferjeux cemeteries. The monument Les Sentinelles de la Mémoire, located on the Promenade des Glacis, also commemorates foreign soldiers of all origins who served during the conflict.

=== Post-World War II ===
Immigration to France, and to Besançon in particular, after the Second World War was primarily driven by the urgent need for labor during the country’s reconstruction. Between the late 1940s and the mid-1970s, large numbers of migrants from Italy, Spain, Portugal, and the Maghreb contributed to the French economic boom, a period commonly referred to as the Trente Glorieuses. During this time, Besançon experienced significant demographic growth and substantial economic development, particularly in the garment and artificial textile industries, watchmaking, food processing, and precision mechanics. Urban expansion also created a high demand for labor. Entire neighborhoods, including Planoise, Les 408, Clairs-Soleils, Palente-Orchamps, and Montrapon-Fontaine-Écu, were built during this period. The construction and public works sector became the city’s largest employer of foreign workers. One notable example was the Lhéritier company, which, out of 290 employees (mostly masons), employed 196 foreign workers: 63 Portuguese, 14 Italians, 40 Moroccans, 32 Algerians, and a smaller number of Yugoslavs, Turks, and others. These immigrant workers were highly profitable for local companies. They accepted difficult working and living conditions and were often managed outside the protection of the French Labor Code. Their marginalization from trade union structures allowed employers to exploit them with few restrictions. In addition, these workers were considered economically efficient: immediately employable, physically robust, motivated, and typically single.

Despite a strong rural exodus, this influx of immigrant labor helped offset the shortage of local workers. Over time, many settled in temporary housing estates and later in the neighborhoods they had helped build. They brought their families, learned French, and began integrating into local society. However, the late 1970s marked a turning point. The closure of several key factories—including Lip in 1977, Rhodiacéta in 1982, and Kelton shortly thereafter—led to a decline in available jobs and a deterioration in living conditions, particularly for immigrants. This period also saw a shift in migration patterns. The demand for unskilled labor decreased, reflecting broader structural changes such as the collapse of the local watchmaking industry and the downsizing of the construction sector.

==== Spanish immigration ====
Andalusia, the primary Spanish region of origin for Besançon's immigrants.

After the war, Besançon received a substantial number of Spanish immigrants, arriving for both political and economic reasons. Political refugees, primarily opponents of the Franco regime, began arriving before 1955. This population, typically aged between 30 and 35, initially viewed their stay as temporary, hoping for a political change that would allow their return to Spain—an outcome that would not materialize until the 1970s. By 1974–1975, the Doubs prefecture recorded only 34 Spanish refugees in Besançon, a figure that reflects the widespread naturalization of earlier arrivals. Most political exiles settled permanently after the 1970s. Economic migration from Spain began during the post-war period, driven by the desire for improved living conditions and better educational opportunities for children. This migration was largely family-based and originated in the broader wave of movement during the late 1950s. The majority of migrants belonged to Spain’s most disadvantaged social classes. During the Trente Glorieuses, at least 350 Spanish families, representing about 1,680 individuals, settled in the city. Migrants primarily came from Andalusia (30.4%), Castile and León (23.9%), Galicia (11.4%) and, to a lesser extent, Asturias. These regional origins reflect broader socio-economic conditions—rural underemployment and agrarian crisis in Andalusia, and urban job scarcity in Castile and León despite some industrial development.

According to INSEE, Spaniards accounted for 15% of all foreign workers in Besançon in 1968. Many were regularized locally due to the slow and cumbersome procedures for obtaining work permits. Men typically worked in construction and public works, sectors facing high demand for labor, while women—particularly younger ones—were employed in domestic services or textile factories. Spanish workers were generally well-regarded by employers, which facilitated their professional advancement and social integration. Housing for these workers varied. While employers were legally required to provide accommodations, most migrants secured housing through family or community networks. Many lived initially in transit housing—such as the Amitié cités, or in neighborhoods like Saint-Ferjeux and Montarmots—before moving into affordable long-term housing. Approximately 100 families settled in historic districts like La Boucle and Battant, though many later relocated to newer neighborhoods such as Planoise, Clairs-Soleils, Palente, Orchamps, and Saint-Claude. Integration was relatively smooth, although language barriers persisted. By 1966, 245 Spanish nationals had been naturalized in the Doubs prefecture, out of 1,373 naturalized foreigners in Besançon, indicating a strong pattern of assimilation Spanish cultural life in the city was also active. Four associations—Club Deportivo Español, Juventud Española, Club Alegria, and Unión Hispánica—were merged in 1972 by the municipality into a single organization, the Centro Español.

==== Italian immigration ====
After the Second World War, Italians arrived in France—alongside Spaniards and Portuguese—to help compensate for the labor shortage resulting from wartime destruction. In 1946, Italians made up the largest foreign community in Besançon, with 810 nationals, followed by 570 Swiss and 133 Poles, out of a total of 1,863 foreigners. The Battant district remained the preferred area of settlement for Italians arriving in the Comtois capital. Although Italian immigration to Besançon had long-standing roots, the post-war period introduced a shift in the migrants’ geographical origins. No longer primarily from northern Italy, many new arrivals came from central and southern regions. In 1950, Italians continued to form the city’s largest foreign community, followed by Algerians and Spaniards. Like most immigrant groups in the city, Italians worked mainly as masons and earthworkers on the numerous construction sites around Besançon. According to the 1954 census, there were 1,017 Italians living in Besançon and 6,002 in the Doubs department.

At the time, around 30% (301 individuals) resided in the Battant area, while 27% (277 individuals) lived in peripheral neighborhoods such as Rosemont, Saint-Ferjeux, Montrapon-Fontaine-Écu, Saint-Claude, and Palente. The city was undergoing rapid demographic and spatial expansion, and the historic center could no longer accommodate the growing population. A significant portion of the Italian community worked in construction: of the 28 building companies listed in the 1956 Doubs telephone directory, nearly 20 had Italian-sounding names such as Bianchi, Bonsignori, Contini, Lorenzon, and Rodari. Although the Fascist regime in Italy had collapsed, integration into French society remained challenging for many Italian immigrants. Prejudices and derogatory terms such as “Rital” and “Macaroni” persisted. Nonetheless, by 1968, Italians still represented the city’s largest foreign community, with around 2,300 individuals. However, according to local historians Aimé Bouilly and Colette Bourlier, Italian immigration had essentially ceased by 1965, with only a few late arrivals from Calabria and Sicily.

==== Portuguese immigration ====
Portuguese immigration to France began in the 1960s, driven by both economic and political factors. Economic motivations included limited development and widespread poverty, while political reasons stemmed from the colonial wars in Angola, Mozambique, and Guinea-Cape Verde. Military service had been extended to four years, with soldiers often sent to the African front. In both France and Besançon, the Portuguese community found employment with relative ease, particularly in construction, public works, the automotive sector, and general industry. However, integration proved difficult. Legal emigration was severely restricted by the Salazar regime, resulting in a large wave of clandestine immigration. Language barriers, housing challenges, and social exclusion further complicated their integration into French society. Many Portuguese migrants initially lived in shantytowns or substandard housing—such as the notorious settlement in Champigny-sur-Marne near Paris. In Besançon, the community was placed in transit housing estates, notably the Tour de l'Amitié I.

Over time, living conditions improved. Shantytowns gave way to proper housing, and the community gradually integrated. The Carnation Revolution of 1974, followed by the end of Portugal’s colonial wars and its accession to the European Union in 1986, significantly improved Portugal’s international image and the situation of its emigrants. In 1979, Portuguese nationals formed the second-largest foreign community in Besançon, with 1,800 individuals. By 1999, their numbers had declined to 922, making them the city’s third-largest foreign community, after Algerians and Moroccans. One notable member of this community is Jacky da Costa, who published Mémoire de la Communauté silencieuse, recounting his life in Barco and Covilhã, his migration to Besançon, and his involvement in local Luso-Bisontin associations rooted in his Christian faith. He estimated the regional Portuguese population at 12,000.

==== Maghrebi immigration ====
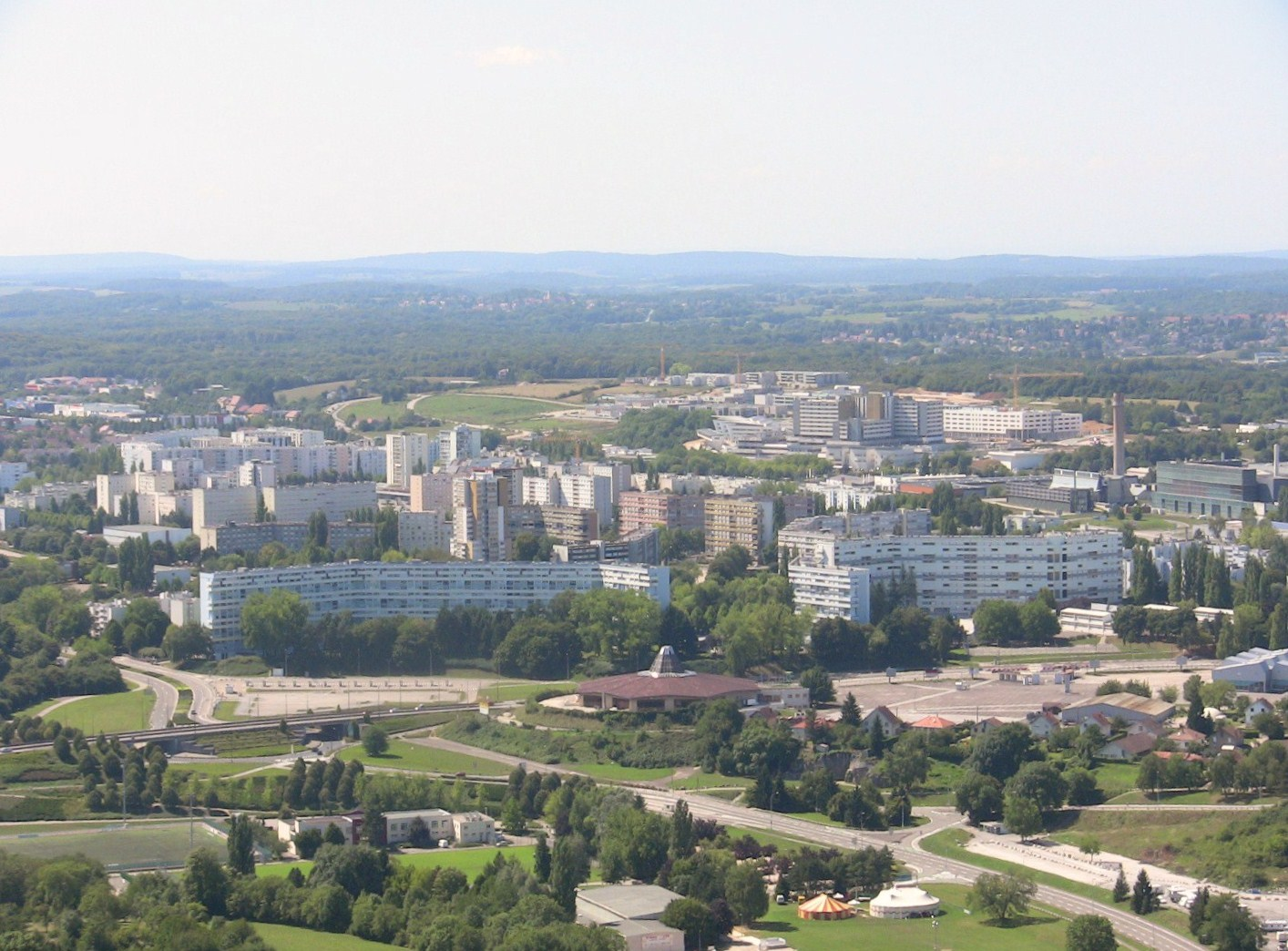
Maghrebi immigrants helped build neighborhoods like Planoise (1959–1968).

Immigration from the Maghreb began in the early 1950s, but intensified from the 1960s onwards, particularly following the independence of the Maghreb countries, and continued into the 1970s and 1980s, especially in the case of Morocco. Between 1947 and 1962, Algerian Muslims held the same legal status as other French citizens, with the right to vote and full civil rights, making them internal migrants akin to Bretons or Corsicans. This status contributed significantly to their migration to Besançon, as in other parts of France. Even after Algeria’s independence in 1962, Algerians retained a relative freedom of movement to France, a situation facilitated by the country's extraordinary post-war economic growth, which demanded a vast labor force—Besançon being no exception.

From 1974, immigration policy became more restrictive, but Algerians continued to settle in the city, with 1976 marking the peak year of Algerian immigration to Besançon. Moroccan immigration became more prominent from 1968, and continued into the 1980s. This persistence of North African immigration beyond the formal end of mass labor migration is largely explained by the policy of family reunification, which allowed the spouse and children under eighteen of a legally resident foreign national to join them in France. A 1982 interview with Abderrahmane Lahlou, Algerian consul in Besançon, illustrates the profound demographic and cultural impact of Algerian immigration in the Comtois capital and the Franche-Comté region more broadly—introducing new customs and the Islamic faith, which was represented by local associations and the Algerian consulate itself. That same year, a report estimated that 50,000 Muslims were living in Franche-Comté.

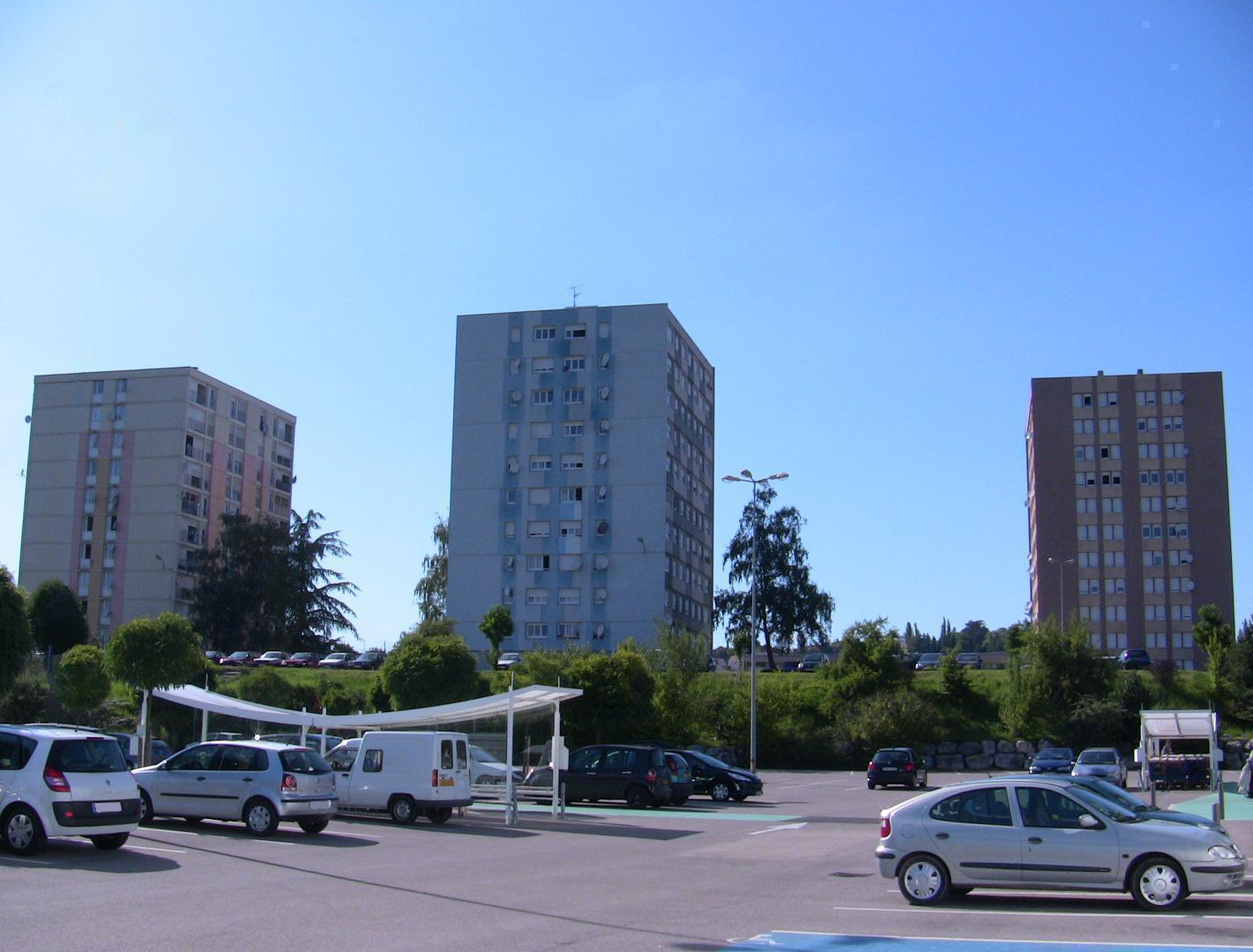
The three towers of the Cité de l'Amitié, 2009.

For years, former soldiers who chose to settle in Besançon lived in abandoned casemates in the glacis near the Viotte train station, often in “appalling conditions,” until a coalition of local figures, including Mayor Jean Minjoz, Freemason Henri Huot, Protestant pastor Jean Carbonare, and Abbé Chays, intervened to secure more humane living conditions. In the 1960s, several transitional housing projects were established to accommodate colonial veterans and newly arrived North African workers. These included the Founottes site (later renamed Escale), Amitié, and Acacias. North African immigrants also settled in newly developed neighborhoods, such as Clairs-Soleils, Montrapon-Fontaine-Écu, and later Planoise, Orchamps, Palente, and the “408".

Many Harkis also settled in the Besançon area during the 1960s. In 1962, Harki families moved into buildings on chemin des Montarmots, into housing for repatriates on rue de Vesoul, and into other neighborhoods including Saint-Claude, Montrapon, Orchamps, Palente, as well as prefabricated homes in Franois, Saône, and the Valdahon military camp. By 1966, there were 488 Harki families in the Doubs department, more than half of them residing in Besançon and its surrounding areas. A 1986 census showed 428 families in the department, two-thirds of whom lived in the Besançon area and one-third in the Pays de Montbéliard, representing around 3,000 people including their children.

==== Asian refugees ====
From the 1970s onward, the Comtois capital received no more than sixty immigrants per year from Cambodia and Vietnam, most of them Buddhist students at Besançon’s Center for Applied Linguistics. After the fall of Phnom Penh on April 17, 1975, around thirty Cambodians and Vietnamese were granted refugee status and chose to settle in the city. Over time, several dozen more arrived through the end of the decade, thanks in part to the efforts of Father Gilles. Social housing in the Saint-Ferjeux district was renovated and made available to these migrants. The Forum de Planoise became the only building in France managed by a municipal social welfare center (Centre communal d'action sociale) to host a temporary accommodation facility specifically for the Asian population. Father Gilles played a central role in integrating members of the community by helping them find employment. He also facilitated the return of around fifty Thai prisoners, a dozen of whom settled in Besançon.

=== Bisontine immigration from 1975 onwards ===
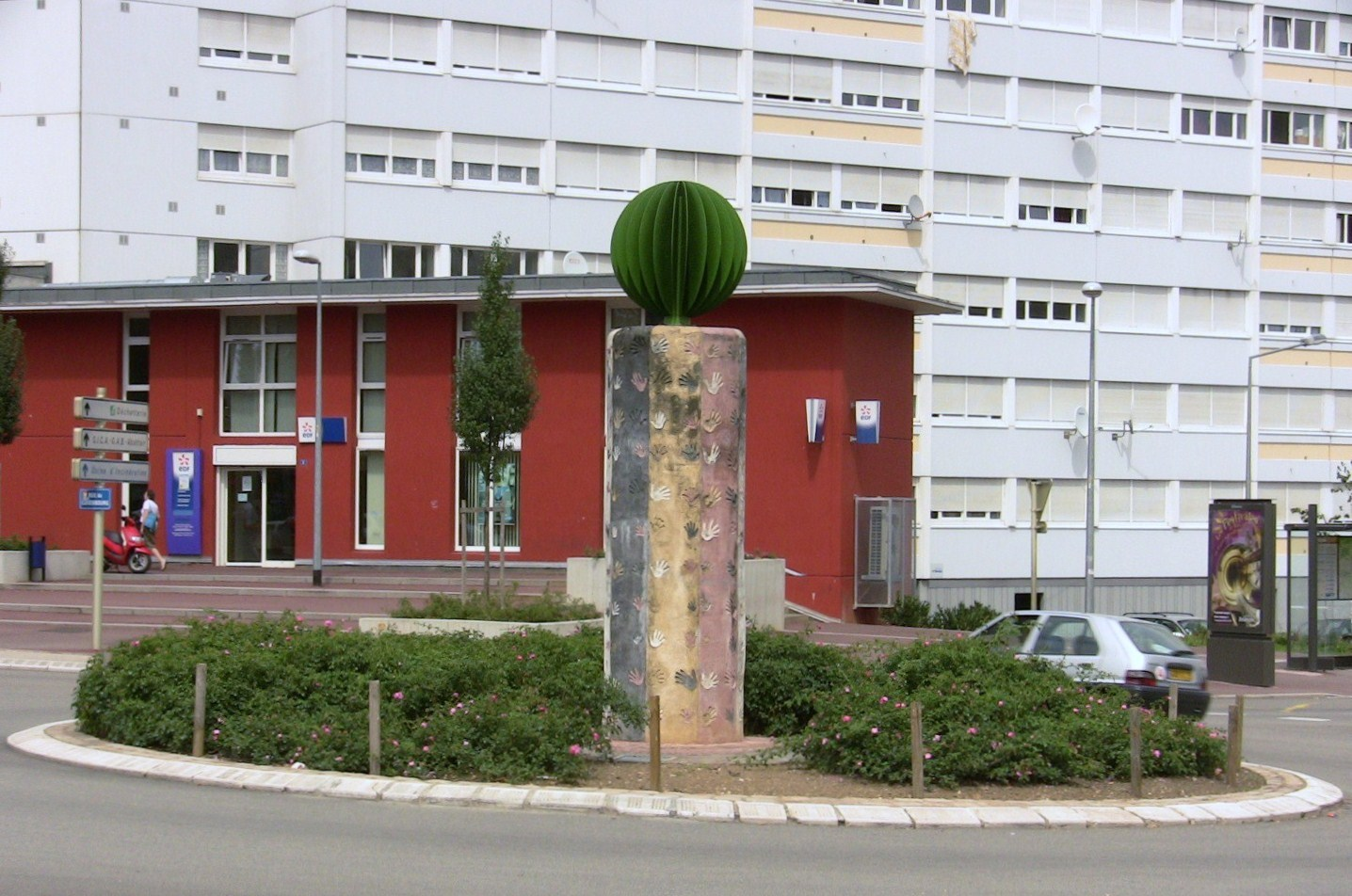
The Statue of Diversity in Planoise, symbolizing inclusivity.

From the 1980s onwards, immigration to the Comtois capital—and to France as a whole—changed significantly. Although migratory flows into the city continued, they were far less substantial than during the post-war period. As a result, the composition of the immigrant population began to shift: many were now skilled or highly skilled workers ("chosen workforce") who entered France legally, while others were unskilled and often came from impoverished backgrounds ("illegal workers") who typically entered the country without documentation. These new migrants to Besançon generally come from Sub-Saharan Africa, Asia, or Central Europe. Since the 1980s, the number of Italians and Spaniards has declined sharply. A slight decrease also affected the Swiss, Algerians, and Portuguese, although the Moroccan population more than doubled between 1975 and 1990—from 934 to 2,057. The Turkish community, which first settled in Besançon in the 1970s, also grew rapidly, although its overall size remained small compared to other foreign populations in the city. As a regional capital, Besançon continued to attract many foreigners, including researchers, international students, and migrants arriving for economic or political reasons, including descendants of earlier migrants such as Italians. New arrivals from Eastern Europe, especially the Balkans (including Roma from Macedonia and Kosovo) as well as other parts of the former Eastern Bloc, settled in the city for both economic and political reasons.

These new migrants generally face the same social, linguistic and integration problems as the populations who arrived in the 1920s or during the Trente Glorieuses. However, many associations have sprung up to help them, and to open up life in Bisont to the cultures of the world. Many immigrants and their descendants retain emotional ties with their homelands, while considering Besançon as their own city. Figures show the evolution of migratory flows: in 1975, the city's main communities were Algerians (3,837), Portuguese (1,907), Italians (1,756), Moroccans (901) and Tunisians (300); in 1983, Algerians were still in first place with 1,718, followed by Portuguese (1,650), Moroccans (1,473), Italians (1,022) and Spaniards (572); finally, the Moroccan community took first place in 1990 with 2,057 people, closely followed by the Algerians in second place with 2,024 people, the Portuguese (1,316 people), the Italians (717 people) and the Turks (464 people).

=== Features of Franc-Comté immigration in 1999 ===
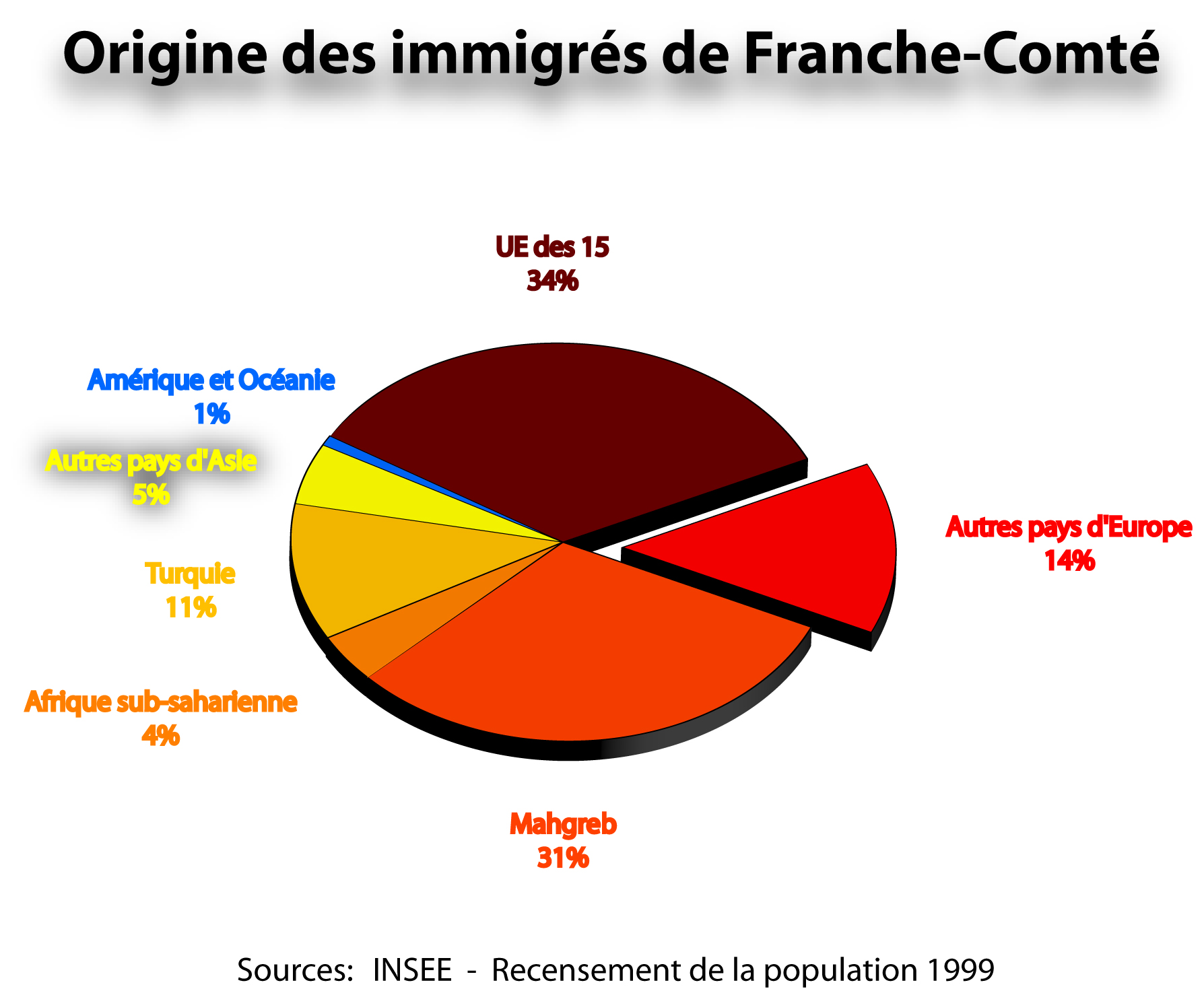
Origins of Franche-Comté immigrants.

Overall, the Franche-Comté region has experienced immigration patterns similar to those of Besançon, although certain disparities exist between cities and departments. Nonetheless, the broader regional history and sociology of foreign populations offer valuable insight into immigration in the Comtois capital.

Franche-Comté, a crossroads of European populations.

As of the late 20th century, Franche-Comté had a foreign population representing 5.9% of its total, slightly below the national average of 7.4%. Immigration to the region began to decline in 1975, with an overall drop of 14%, while immigration levels in the rest of France continued to rise or stabilize. According to 1999 data, the majority of migrants in the region came from the 15 European Union countries outside France (34%), followed by the Maghreb—Morocco, Algeria, and Tunisia (31%). Other origins included Eastern Europe (14%), Turkey (11%), other Asian countries (5%), Sub-Saharan Africa (4%), and the Americas and Oceania (1%). More than 100 nationalities were represented in Franche-Comté, with the five largest groups being Moroccans (15.7%), Algerians (14.1%), Portuguese (13.9%), Italians (12%), and Turks (10.6%)—accounting for over two-thirds of the total immigrant population. The region also had a relatively high proportion of migrants from the former Yugoslavia, who made up 4.8% of the immigrant population—well above the national average of 1.7%. Franche-Comté ranked just behind Alsace as the leading French region in terms of the number of Turkish immigrants, even though they were only the fifth largest foreign community in the region.

The sociological profile of immigrants in Franche-Comté differs in some respects from that of the native French population. In 1999, the region's immigrant population was aging: 25% were aged 60 or older, 40% were between 40 and 59, and only 35% were under 40. In contrast, in 1975, over-60s made up just over 5%, while those under 40 accounted for nearly 70%. Gender demographics also shifted over time: women represented 50% of immigrants in 1999, compared to just 40% in 1975. These demographic characteristics, however, vary by nationality.

==== In Besançon ====
According to the 1999 general population census, Besançon had 10,426 immigrants, representing 8.9% of the city’s total population. The main countries of origin were Algeria (1,933), Morocco (1,485), Portugal (1,010), Italy (800), and Turkey (482), closely mirroring regional trends. However, in the city, Algerians formed the largest group, followed by Moroccans. More than 53.1% of the immigrant population in Besançon lived in social housing (HLM), and the unemployment rate among them stood at 29.3%.

Origin	Population	Share in %	
Origin	Population	Male	Female
Algeria	1,933	19.5	17.5
Morocco	1,485	15.9	12.6
Portugal	1,010	9.5	9.9
Italy	800	7.0	8.3
Turkey	482	4.8	4.4
Other countries	4,716	43.3	47.3
Total	10,426	50.6	49.4

Housing	Population	Share in%
Owners	1,244	20.5
Tenants (non-social housing)	1,223	20.1
Tenants (social housing)	3,222	53.1
Immigrant households	6,071	100.0
Other	382	6.3

Labor Market	Population	% Men	% Women
Employed	5,381	58.1	41.9
Activity Rate (in %)	54.2	60.6	45.0
Unemployed	1,574	51.9	48.1
Unemployment Rate (in %)	29.3	26.1	33.6

== Impact of immigration to Besançon ==
Immigration to Besançon has often disrupted local life. Indeed, new populations have almost always had an impact on the city's history (the rise of the city under Roman rule, the colonial settlers of the 1st and 2nd World Wars), demographics (the increase in the population of Besançon during the various waves of immigration), culture (artists from immigrant families, the appearance of new architecture) or religion (the emergence of Judaism, Islam and Buddhism), and sometimes even the economy (the founding of the watchmaking industry by the Swiss, immigration in the 1960s for labor). The Sequani and Romans laid early foundations, with Roman structures like the Porte Noire enduring. Jewish settlers introduced commerce and religious diversity, with the 1869 Besançon Synagogue as a testament. Swiss watchmakers established a key industry, while Italians influenced Renaissance architecture, notably the Palais Granvelle. Post-war Maghrebi, Spanish, and Portuguese workers built modern neighborhoods like Planoise, leaving a lasting urban footprint. Associations and symbols like the Statue of Diversity reflect Besançon's inclusive identity.

=== Demographic impact ===
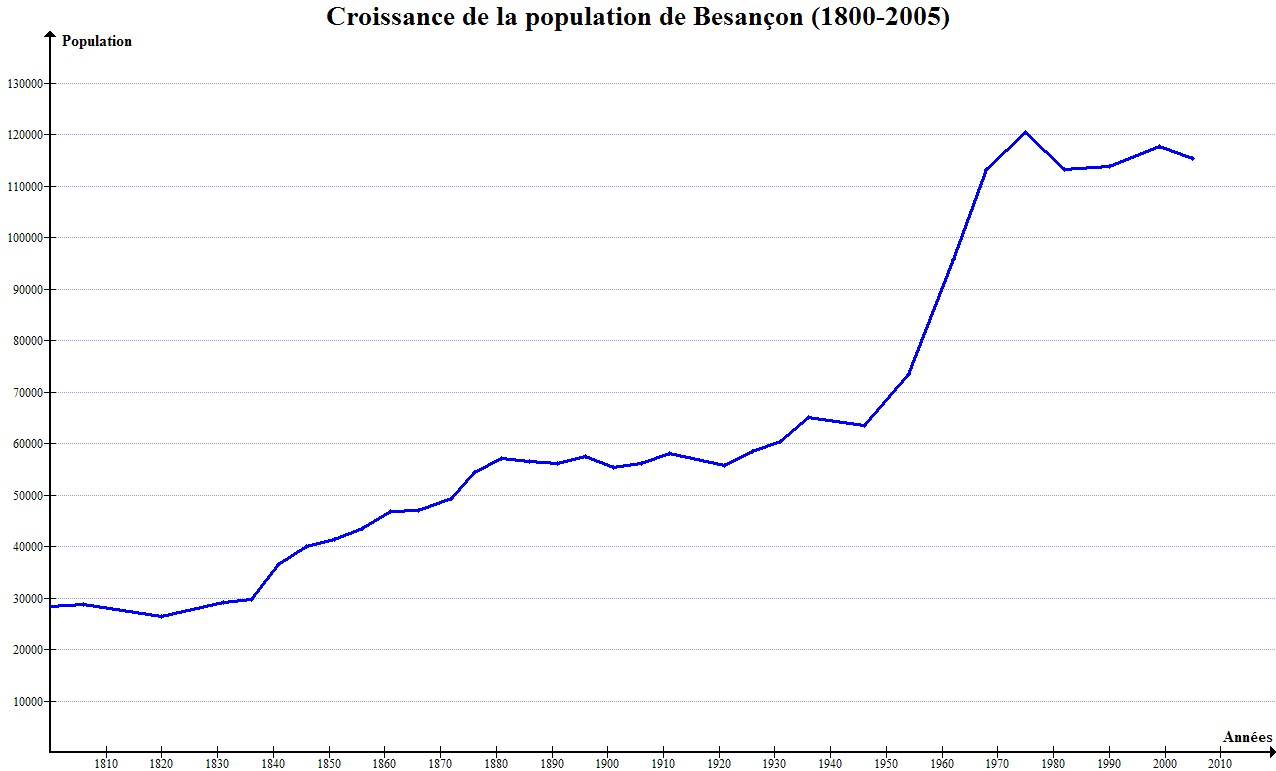
Population growth in Besançon (1800–2005).

Until 1946, the city's two main foreign communities were Italians and Swiss, the result of several long-standing waves of immigration. However, from 1954 onwards, the trend was reversed for the Swiss, who became less and less numerous, in contrast to the Italians, who experienced a new migratory surge at this time. New communities also appeared at this time: Algerians arrived in 1954, reaching their peak in 1976; Spaniards also arrived in the city at this time, but this wave of migration was short-lived, as the Spanish population began to decline from 1968 onwards. As for the Portuguese, they had been settling in the Comtoise capital since 1962, and their arrival was particularly significant until 1977. Finally, the city's Moroccan population immigrated from 1968 until the 1980s. Other, more minor influxes took place at the end of the 1960s, but remained at a relatively low level, as in the case of Tunisians, Yugoslavs, and Turks. From the end of the 1970s and throughout the 1980s, the populations of the older waves of migrants declined. Italian, Spanish and Portuguese communities saw their numbers halved. Algerian immigration is also declining, while Moroccans and Turks are still on the rise. New nationalities are increasing in number, notably from sub-Saharan African countries such as Senegal, but also from South-East Asia.

Immigration flows between 1946 and 1970, coinciding with the massive arrival of French families from the countryside, increased the population of Bisont from 65,000 to over 120,000. It is estimated that between 1946 and 1999, the city of Besançon welcomed a total of 131,316 foreigners of all nationalities. These new populations are particularly visible in certain districts of the city, notably Planoise, where in 2008 there were more than 50 different nationalities.

Changes in the nationalities of foreigners in Besançon from 1946 to 1999
	1946	1954	1962	1968	1971	1972	1973	1974	1975	1977	1979	1981	1983	1990	1999
Italians	810	1017	2088	2300	1985	1816	1904	1832	1756	1487	1370	1185	1022	717	484
Swiss	570	781	500	348	316	309	313	-	297	283	210	193	186	-	-
Spaniards	65	181	487	1096	1097	1088	1086	1087	960	841	743	633	572	400	272
Yugoslavs	12	15	-	96	171	216	294	289	281	258	220	190	205	-	-
Poles	13	124	67	72	35	33	-	-	32	33	-	26	16	-	-
Russians	50	58	-	-	-	-	-	-	-	-	-	-	-	-	-
Portuguese	20	10	80	740	1380	1640	1897	1896	1907	1965	1817	1744	1650	1316	922
Algerians	0	282	1034	1416	1899	2201	3652	3793	3837	3100	2695	2622	1718	2024	1545
Moroccans	0	3	-	228	389	639	795	901	934	1134	1251	1231	1473	2057	1300
Tunisians	0	2	-	36	142	241	299	300	297	300	299	332	313	316	288
Turks	1	3	-	-	27	49	120	114	154	282	287	341	327	464	522
Senegalese	-	-	-	-	-	0	-	-	12	35	37	41	103	-	-
Southeast Asians	-	-	-	-	-	57	-	-	71	27	53	97	235	-	-
Refugees and Stateless	-	-	-	-	121	121	109	117	116	183	229	404	550	-	-
Total Foreigners	1767	2730	4978	6876	8357	9223	11,639	11,986	12,233	11,664	10,925	10,379	10,050	10,562	7947

=== Emergence of new religions ===
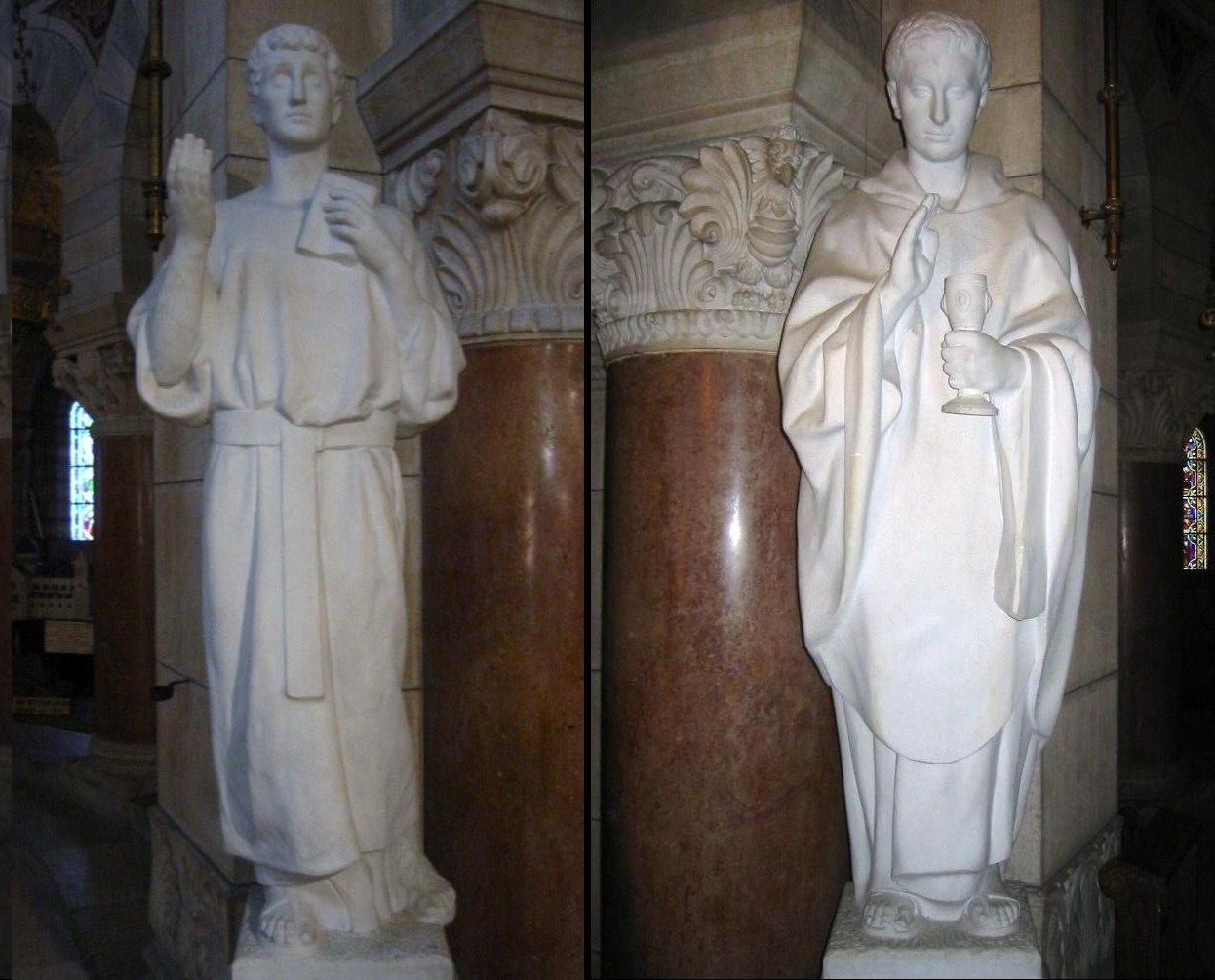
Statues of Saint Ferréol and Saint Ferjeux.

The population of Besançon and much of Franche-Comté has been predominantly Catholic since the region was evangelized in the 3rd century by the martyred saints Ferjeux and Ferréol, although some historians question the veracity of this version. Over the centuries, dozens of churches were built in and around the Comtois capital, and although the Reformation and the separation of Church and State disrupted the omnipotence of the Church in Franche-Comté, Christianity still remains the majority religion in the region.

Other religions and congregations appeared over the centuries, notably with immigration: Jews since the Middle Ages, the Reformed Protestantism from the 16th century onwards, followed by Muslims from the 1870s, then Buddhism in the 1970s, and finally an Orthodox Christian community founded in 2006.

==== Judaism ====
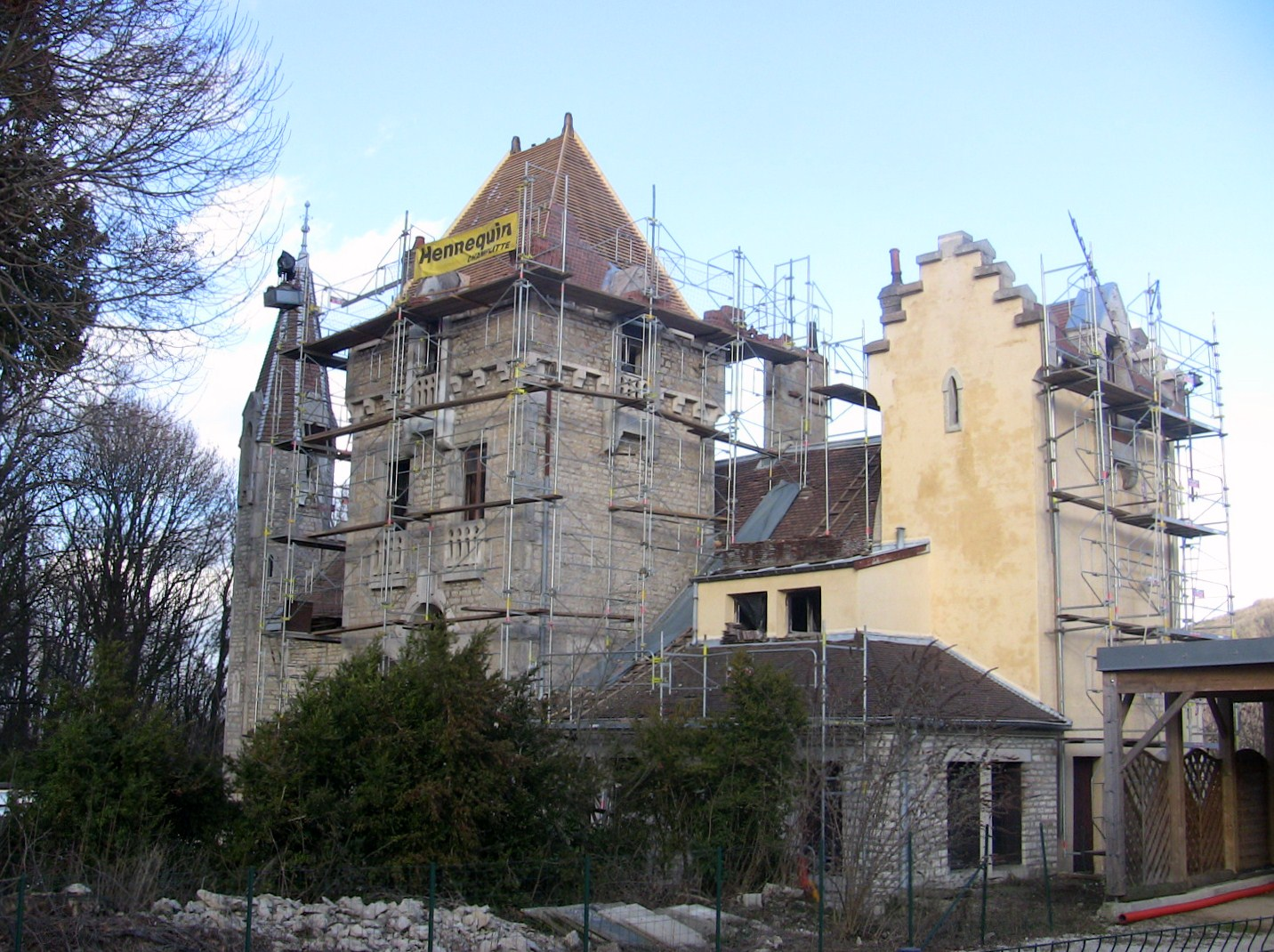
Château de la Juive.

Today, Judaism is the third-largest religion in Bisont, after Christianity and Islam, with around 150 families, mainly shopkeepers, executives, and employees. Post-war immigration from North Africa has given a new face to the city's Jewish community, to the extent that synagogue services are now held under the Sephardic rite. Numerous traces of the community's importance remain, including the Besançon synagogue, the city's Jewish cemetery, and the Château de la Juive. Since the 1970s, the community has had an association (the "Maison Jérôme Cahen"), as well as the Besançon Shalom radio station since 2008, under the aegis of the Besançon consistory.

==== Islam ====
Islam has been present in Franche-Comté since the 1870s, with the presence in the region of colonial soldiers, most of whom came from the Maghreb. However, Islam did not take root until the 1960s, following the massive arrival of immigrants from the former French colonies, many of them from North Africa. After many difficulties linked to the integration of this new population and to the problems encountered in practicing the Muslim religion, the Bisontine community gradually began to organize itself, and associations began to emerge in the late 1980s, such as the Sunna association. In the 1990s, the first prayer halls were opened, followed by the Sunna mosque in Besançon.

The 21st century brought prosperity to the Besançon community, with sufficient places of worship in the city's main districts. However, the Muslim communities of Besançon and France are also experiencing a great deal of controversy, notably over the burqa, the place of minarets in France and, less directly, the question of national identity. According to radio station France Bleu Besançon, in 2010 the city had 15,000 Muslims, representing around 13% of Besançon's total population and placing this faith second only to Christianity in terms of numbers.

==== New Christian denominations ====
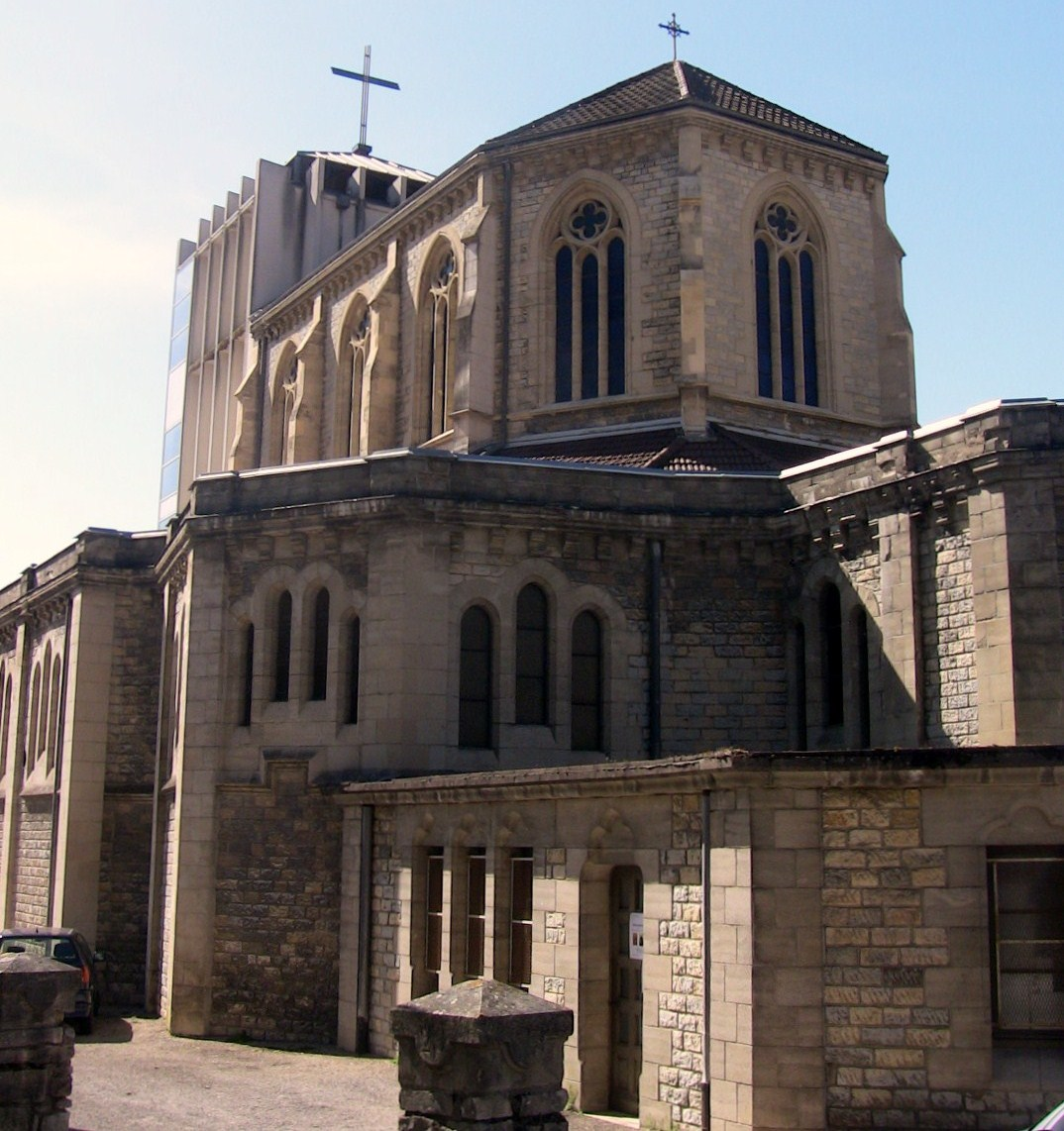
The Sainte-Jeanne-d'Arc Church, Orthodox section.

Since 2006, Besançon has officially been home to an Orthodox religious community, with a parish located on the side of the Sainte-Jeanne-d'Arc de Bregille church. The community, which has taken the name of Protection de la Mère de Dieu et Saint Georges (Protection of the Mother of God and Saint George), comes mainly from Romania, Russia, and the whole of Eastern Europe. This Orthodox group is recognized and integrated into the Romanian Orthodox Metropolis of Western and Southern Europe. It is one of the city's only Eastern churches. The Saint-Vasilije Ostroski Cudotvorac parish on chemin des Quatrouillots in the Saint-Claude district is home to the Serbian Orthodox community.

The Reformed Protestants of Besançon have been present in the city since the 16th century, but their community of just a few members was not recognized. It wasn't until the early 19th century that negotiations began between the Protestants and the city, and on January 6, 1805, they acquired the former Capucins chapel, now called the Temple de Chamars, as a place of worship. However, the building had to close, and the last service was held on April 24, 1842, as the chapel had to be reallocated by the city for the artillery arsenal. The former chapel of the Hospitaliers du Saint-Esprit hospital was thus offered to the Protestants of Besançon as a new place of worship, following restoration of the building by the city. In 1842, the city ceded the chapel and the adjacent tower of the former hospital to the Protestant community, and on April 28, 1842, the Temple du Saint-Esprit was dedicated.

==== Buddhism ====
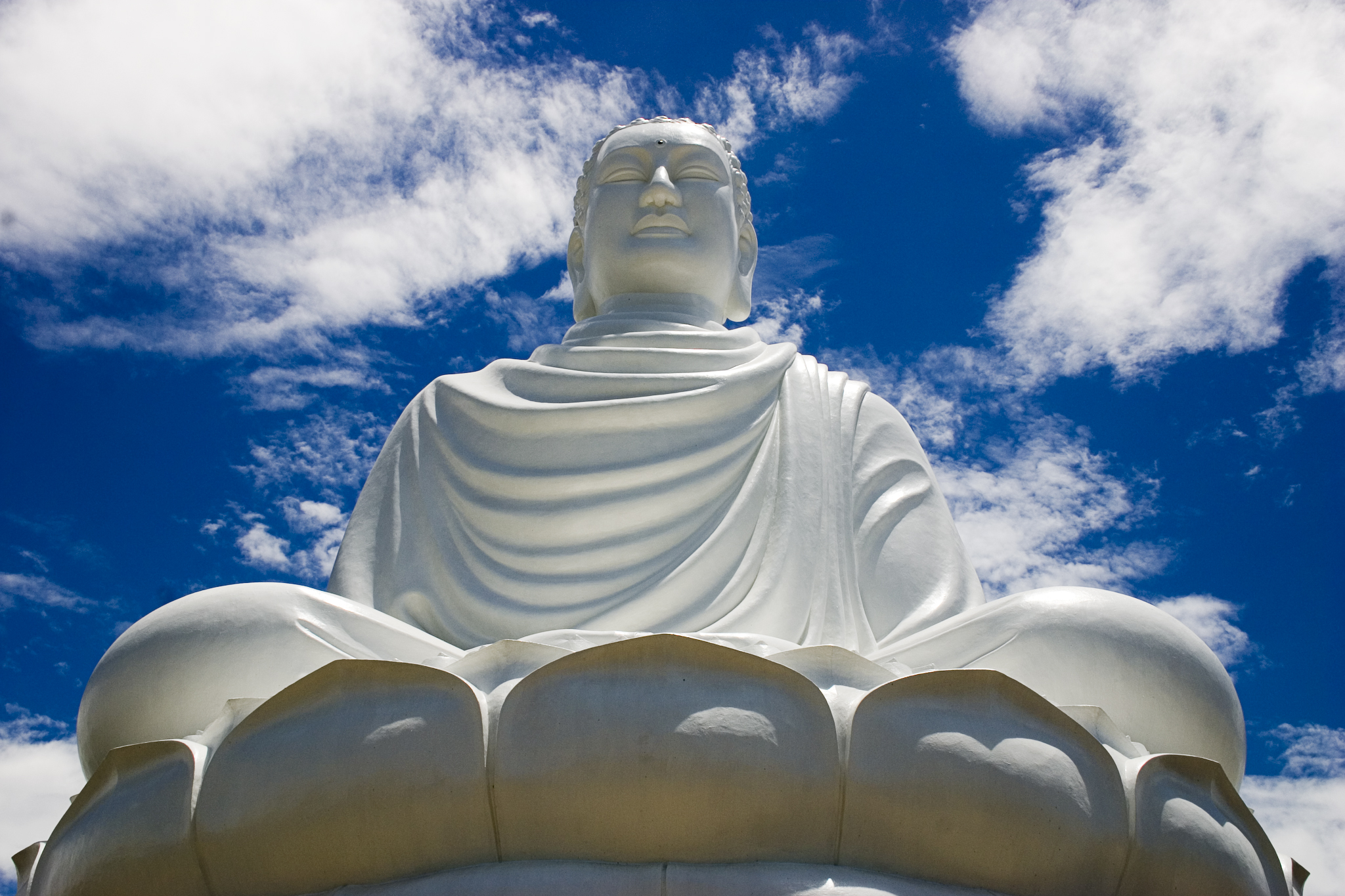
A Buddha statue.

As soon as it was integrated into the population of Besançon, the Asian community, and more particularly the Cambodians, asserted their desire to practice their religion, and so the "Centre bouddhique de Besançon" was created to set up a pagoda in a building in Planoise. In 1982, a monk who had just arrived from Cambodia took up residence in the Comtois capital to perform religious ceremonies and guide practitioners, but later left the city. Thus, Buddhists in Bisont refer to the bonzes of Lyon and Nancy. The city's Laotian and Vietnamese communities encountered a number of difficulties related to their worship (e.g. recourse to pagodas outside the city, or the practice of spirit worship requiring a life close to nature), which gradually led to a decline in the practice of Buddhist worship. In 1990, the "Association bouddhiste vietnamienne de Besançon" (Besançon Vietnamese Buddhist Association) was set up, bringing in a bonze from Paris for community celebrations. Although efforts have been made, Buddhism is in decline in the Comtois capital, mainly due to young people's ignorance of their parents' religion, but also and above all due to the lack of infrastructure and Buddhist representatives in the city. A report from 1988 by France 3 shows the organization of the festival of flowers and the dead in Besançon by the Association des Cambodgiens de Franche-Comté. For the first time, this event was celebrated at the same time by the Laotian, Cambodian, and Vietnamese communities, who came for the occasion from all over eastern France. This report shows the rite of the Feast of the Dead, and reports that 3,000 people from South-East Asia were living in Franche-Comté at the time. The festival was also an opportunity to raise funds for the Planoise Buddhist Cultural Center.

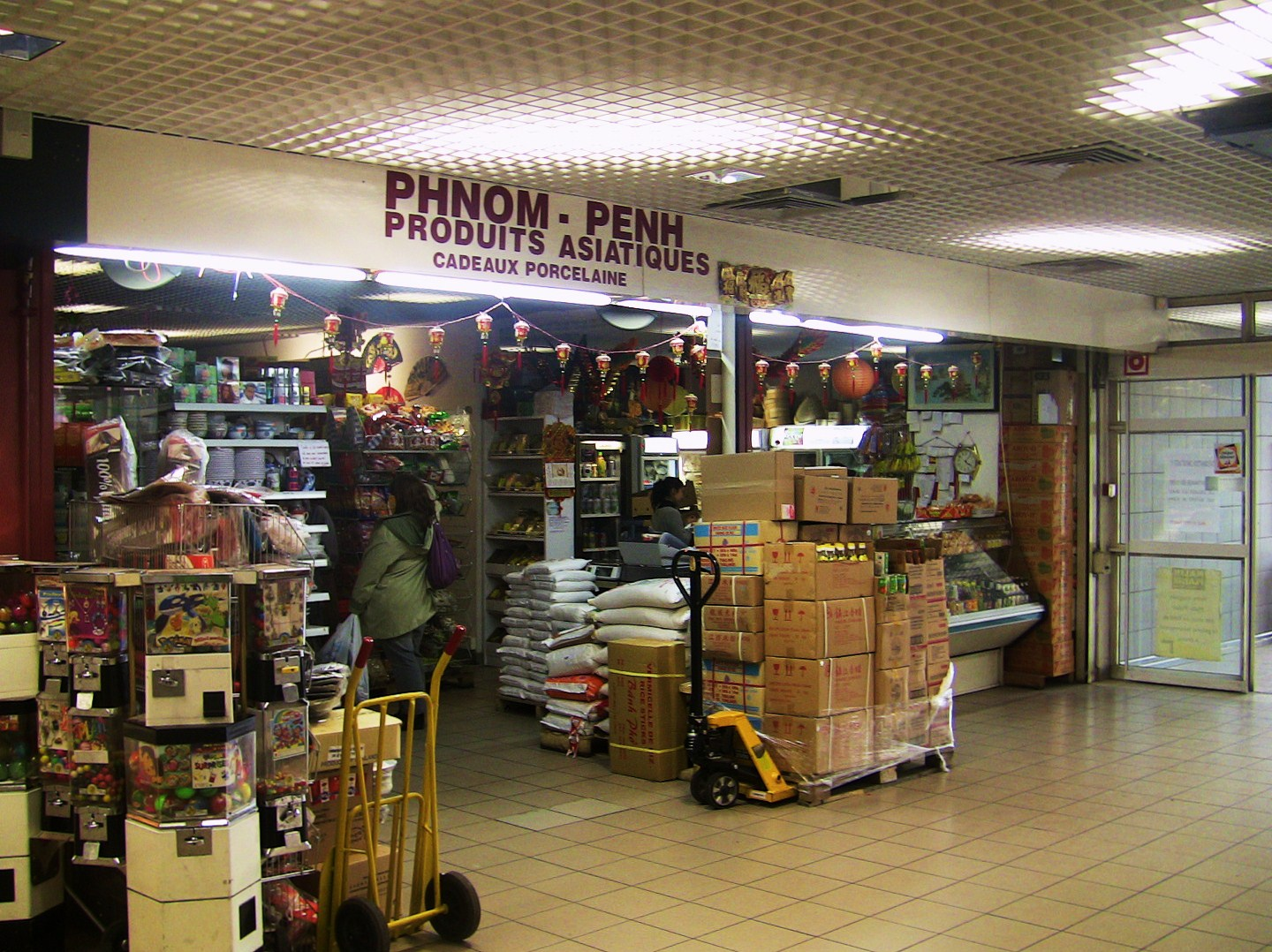
A typical Asian store in Planoise.

New Chinese immigration is bringing vitality to the community and giving it a new face. Numerous Chinese stores, including restaurants, have opened in the Comtoise capital, as in the Planoise district and the city's historic center. In addition to the Buddhist Center, Besançon now boasts a Kagyüpa-type association called "Association Émergences," founded in 2003, as well as the "Groupe Shambhala Bouddhiste de Besançon," located in the Fontaine-Argent area. Buddhism is currently the fourth most popular religion in Besançon, after Christianity, Islam, and Judaism.

=== Emergence of new cultures ===
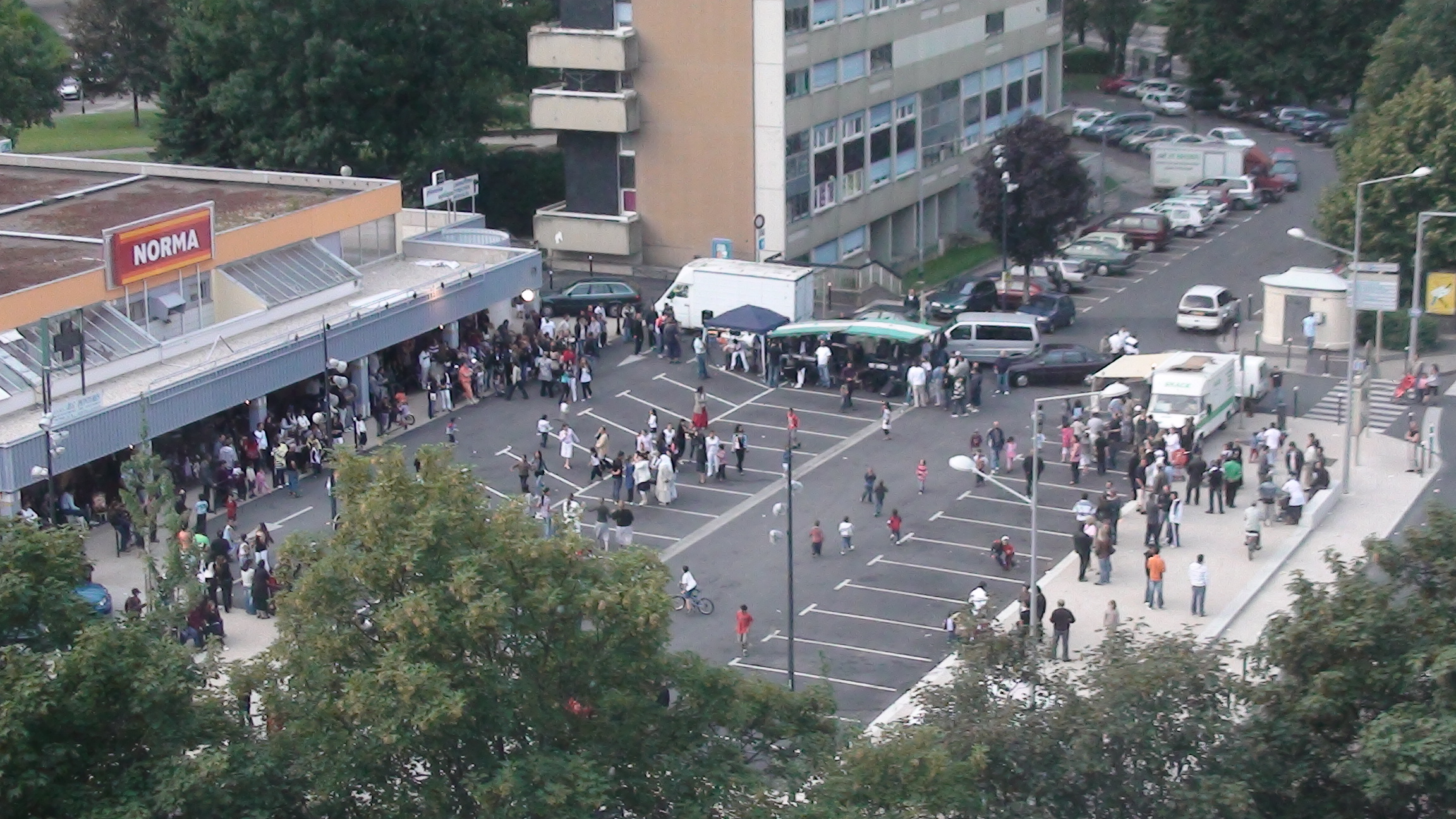
The Fête de la Musique in Planoise, a meeting point for diverse communities.

In addition to the emergence of new religions, immigrant populations have brought their own customs and habits, including language, dress codes and the arts (especially music). Although these cultures are generally forgotten, they are still present in France and the Comtois capital.

Only Arabic and Portuguese remain stable, albeit on the fringes, being understood and correctly spoken in 2% of French households in the case of the former, and 1% in the case of the latter. However, it's not uncommon to hear these languages in places that are typical of certain parts of the city, such as halal butcher shops and markets, particularly in Planoise. It's also worth noting that some Arabic and foreign words are present in contemporary French slang, not least because French people of North African origin are a significant component of the populations of working-class neighborhoods. Traditional dress is rarely worn, although the presence of Islamic veils and traditional costumes (mainly hijabs and djellabas) is occasionally visible, but mainly worn by the first generation, of North African origin.

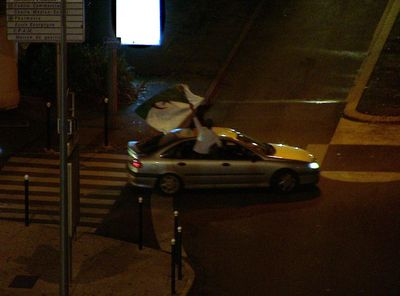
A car with passengers waving an Algerian flag during qualification for the 2010 FIFA World Cup.

The Planoise district, which organizes its own music festival, Fête de la Musique, thanks to local residents, features oriental, Kabyle, Turkish, Kosovar, and world music, demonstrating the city's ethnic diversity and introducing its residents to traditional music, mostly from Muslim countries. However, few singers of foreign origin from Bisont have performed songs in languages other than French (or English), with the younger generation generally preferring hip-hop. Paradoxically, although the younger generation of Moroccan and North African origin is less scrupulous about applying their parents' religion and customs, they consider themselves more nationals of their home countries than of France, and keep in regular contact with their parents' countries of origin.

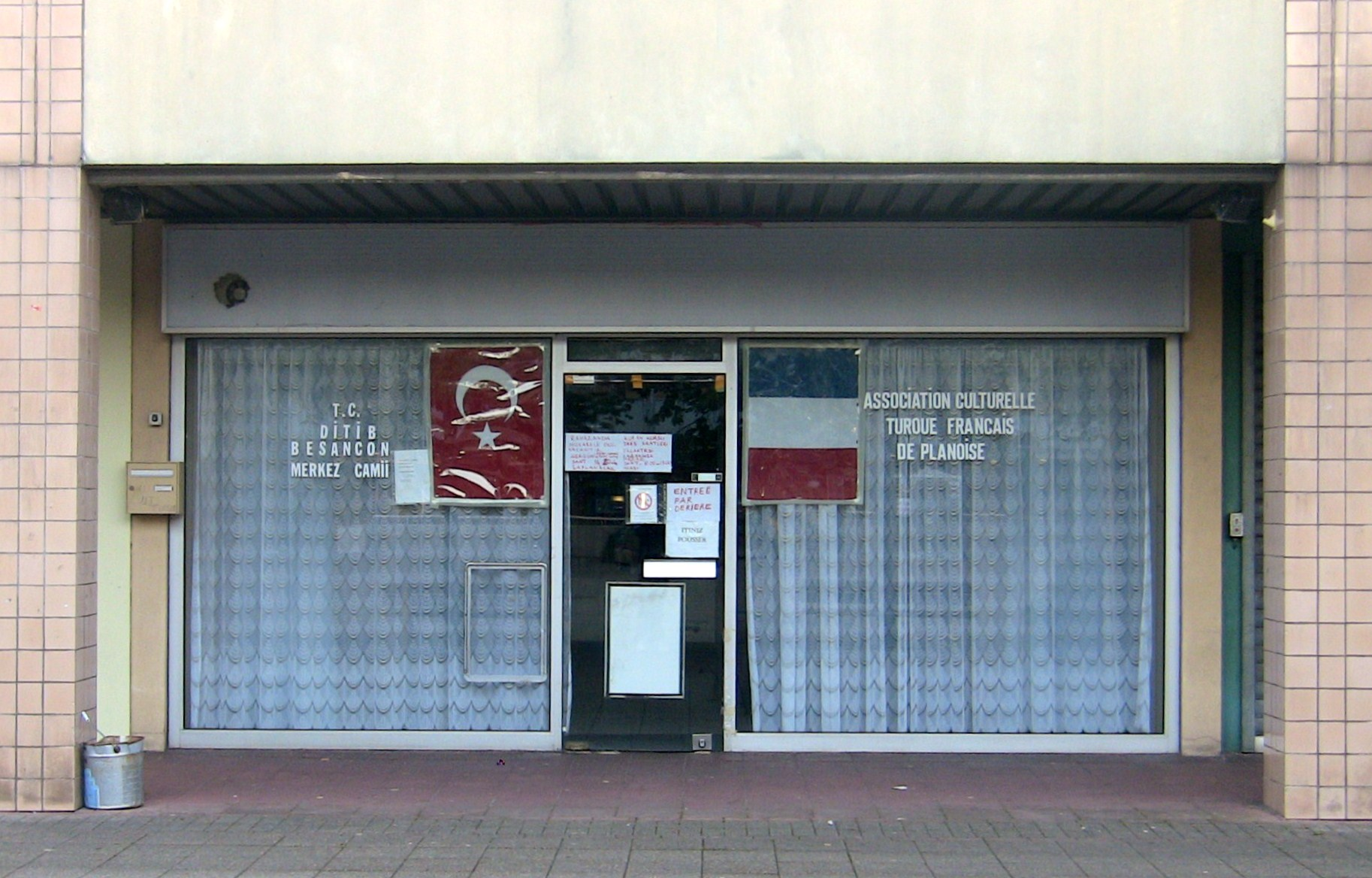
The French-Turkish Cultural Association in Planoise.

=== Foreign associations in Besançon ===
Arab-Muslims have several associations at their disposal: the Sunna Association, present in the town's main mosque, and the Al-Fath Association, present in the eponymous Planoise mosque. The city's Turkish community can worship through the Association Culturelle des Turcs de Besançon and the Amicale Franco-Turque de Besançon-Planoise, located in the Châteaufarine prayer hall, as well as the Association de la Jeunesse Musulmane de Besançon and the Association islamique des Turcs de Besançon, located in the Clairs-Soleils prayer hall. There is also an Italian association in the Comtois capital: the Sardinian Association "Su Tirsu", located on rue de Belfort. These organizations foster cultural preservation and community integration.

== Bisontine figures of immigrant origin ==
The Comtois capital has always been home to personalities from other countries. Many of Bisont's leading figures have parents or grandparents who are Arab-Muslim, African or from European regions other than France—such as Italy, Central Europe, or Belgium—or were themselves born abroad and later moved to the city. Still others have studied or worked in the city, as is the case for most of Bisont's artists and sportsmen and women. Their involvement in the life of Bisont thus highlights the ethnic diversity and cosmopolitanism of the Comtois capital.

=== European figures ===
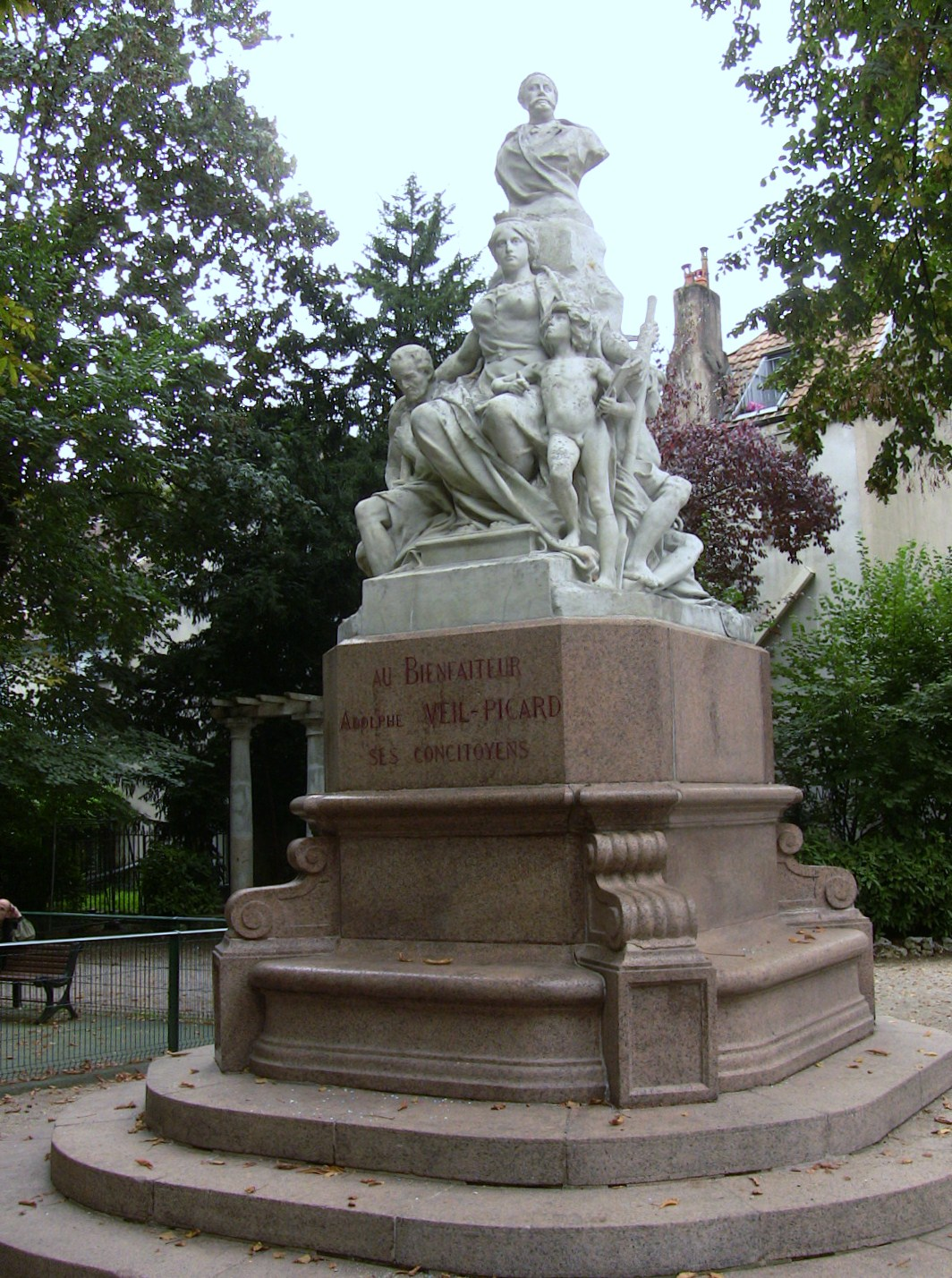
The Veil-Picard Monument.

A number of personalities from Europe have left their mark on Besançon, such as Laurent Mégevand from Geneva, founder of the Besançon watchmaking industry, Franco-Belgian scriptwriter Jean-François Di Giorgio and Italian-born sculptor Jean-Baptiste Francesqui. Footballers Ryszard Tarasiewicz, Henri Skiba and Stefan Białas of Polish origin, Rudi Strittich and Camillo Jerusalem of Austrian origin, and Eddy Dublin of Luxembourg played for Besançon Racing Club. But other personalities from Besançon also had strong links with other European countries, such as Besançon-born Antoine Perrenot de Granvelle, who was Archbishop of Malines-Brussels, State Councillor to Charles V and Philip II of Spain, Prime Minister of the Spanish Netherlands, Viceroy of Naples and President of the Supreme Council of Italy and Castile. Viviane Wade, wife of Senegal's current head of state Abdoulaye Wade, was born in Besançon.

Numerous Jewish personalities from Besançon, most of them from Central Europe, have also contributed to the city's history, including the Veil-Picard family of Alsatian origin, the Lipmann family (founders of Lip), the Weil family and rabbis Paul Haguenauer and René Gutman.

=== Arab-Muslim figures ===
The Comtois capital is home to a number of prominent figures from the Maghreb, most of whom are of the Muslim faith. These include Rachid Djebaili, an Algerian footballer who grew up in Planoise, Mohamed Louhkiar, a Moroccan footballer, Khedafi Djelkhir, a boxer of Algerian origin, Ghani Yalouz, a wrestler born in Casablanca, the rap group Mifa Saï Saï, city councillor Michel Omouri, and Salah Gaham, who died heroically trying to stop car fires during the 2005 riots.

The town is home to a number of large immigrant families, the largest and best-known of which is the Hakkar family. Originally from Khenchela, the Hakkar family has a history typical of Algerian-Muslim families in the Comtois capital. Merzoug Hakkar was one of the first Algerians to immigrate to the city in 1957, having fought on the side of France during the Second World War and then for Algerian independence. His family joined him in the following years, and little by little, the Hakkars became the city's largest family, currently numbering some 1,000 members. The most illustrious of these is boxer Morrade Hakkar, but other members are also doctors, lawyers, film-makers, and company directors. Another family member, Abdelhamid Hakkar, was sentenced to life imprisonment in 1989 for the murder of a policeman, Brigadier Alain Schaffer. After the European Court of Human Rights imposed a new trial, he was convicted again in 2003.

Aldo Naouri, a doctor of Judeo-Libyan origin, also passed through the town. Having spent a number of years in the Comtois capital, he has made a major contribution to pediatrics and, to a lesser extent, psychoanalysis.

=== African and Asian figures ===
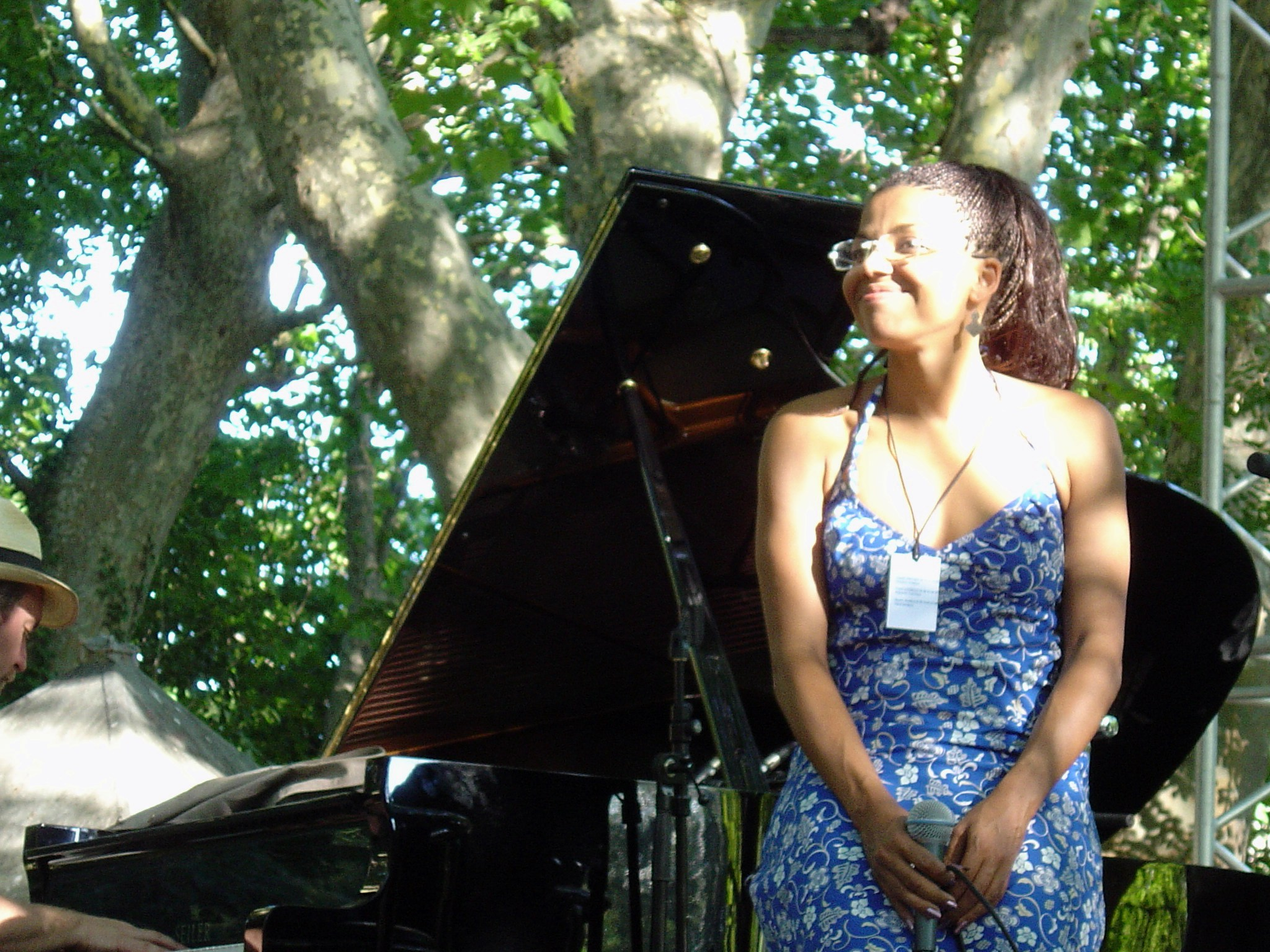
Mina Agossi at the Charlie Jazz Festival, July 2, 2005.

There are few black-African personalities from the Comtois capital, with the exception of Franco-Beninese jazz singer Mina Agossi and Senegalese Mamadou Thiam, who lived in the Clairs-Soleils district from the age of 11, where he grew up and made his debut in the rings. However, the town also boasts a number of prominent figures, such as current Senegalese head of state Abdoulaye Wade, who holds an honorary doctorate from the University of Franche-Comté, where he studied from 1952 to 1955 before articling at the Besançon Bar from 1955 to 1957; his wife Viviane Wade is a native of the town. Burkinabe players Tanguy Barro and Hamado Ouedraogo, Ivorians Georges Ba and Jean-Jacques Domoraud, Senegalese David Amadou M'Bodji, Congolese Thomas Florin, Malian Moussa Traoré, and Félicien Mbanza from Burundi have all played for Besançon Racing Club.

The city also boasts an Asian personality: rapper Lil Shaolin, one of whose parents is Vietnamese. He has filmed several clips about the city and the Planoise district, the most famous of which are "à 25 000 km/h" and "2.5 triple zéro." An Indian is also popular in the Comtois capital: Siva Sivasankaran, a flower seller. He was already well known to the people of Bisonne for having sold roses in restaurants for many years, but his arrest and subsequent threat of eviction mobilized a good number of people in the city, giving it a certain local notoriety.

== See also ==
- Besançon Racing Club
- History of the Jews in Besançon
- Immigration to France
- Islam in Besançon
- Planoise
- University of Franche-Comté

== Bibliography ==
- Gagnieux, Alain (2001). Étrangers de chez nous, L'immigration dans le Doubs et à Colombier-Fontaine (1850–1950) [Foreigners among us: Immigration in Doubs and Colombier-Fontaine (1850–1950)]. Éditions du Sekoya. p. 167. ISBN 978-2-84751-003-4.
- Kawtar, Najib (2008). Immigration et pratiques religieuses. La question de l'intégration. Les disparités de pratiques religieuses dans les quartiers de Besançon [Immigration and religious practices: The question of integration. Disparities in religious practices in Besançon's neighborhoods]. Presses Universitaires de Franche-Comté. p. 116.
- Fohlen, Claude (1965). Histoire de Besançon [History of Besançon]. Vol. II. Palais des Beaux-Arts. ISBN 978-2-84066-073-6.
- Coindre, Gaston. Mon vieux Besançon (1900-1910) [My Old Besançon]. Éditions de la Tour Gile.
- Noiriel, Gérard (2007). Immigration, antisémitisme et racisme en France [Immigration, Antisemitism, and Racism in France]. Fayard. ISBN 978-2-213-63001-4.
- Blanchard, Pascal; Lemaire, Sandrine (2002). Culture coloniale, la France conquise par son Empire (1873–1931) [Colonial Culture: France Conquered by Its Empire (1873–1931)]. Éditions Autrement. ISBN 978-2-86260-918-8.
- Gagnieux, Alain (2008). Une véritable petite ville au sein de Besançon : Planoise [A true small city within Besançon: Planoise]. City of Besançon. ISBN 9782860250085.
