= Château de la Juive =

Residential castle in Chalezeule, France

Coordinates: 47°14′56″N 6°03′44″E

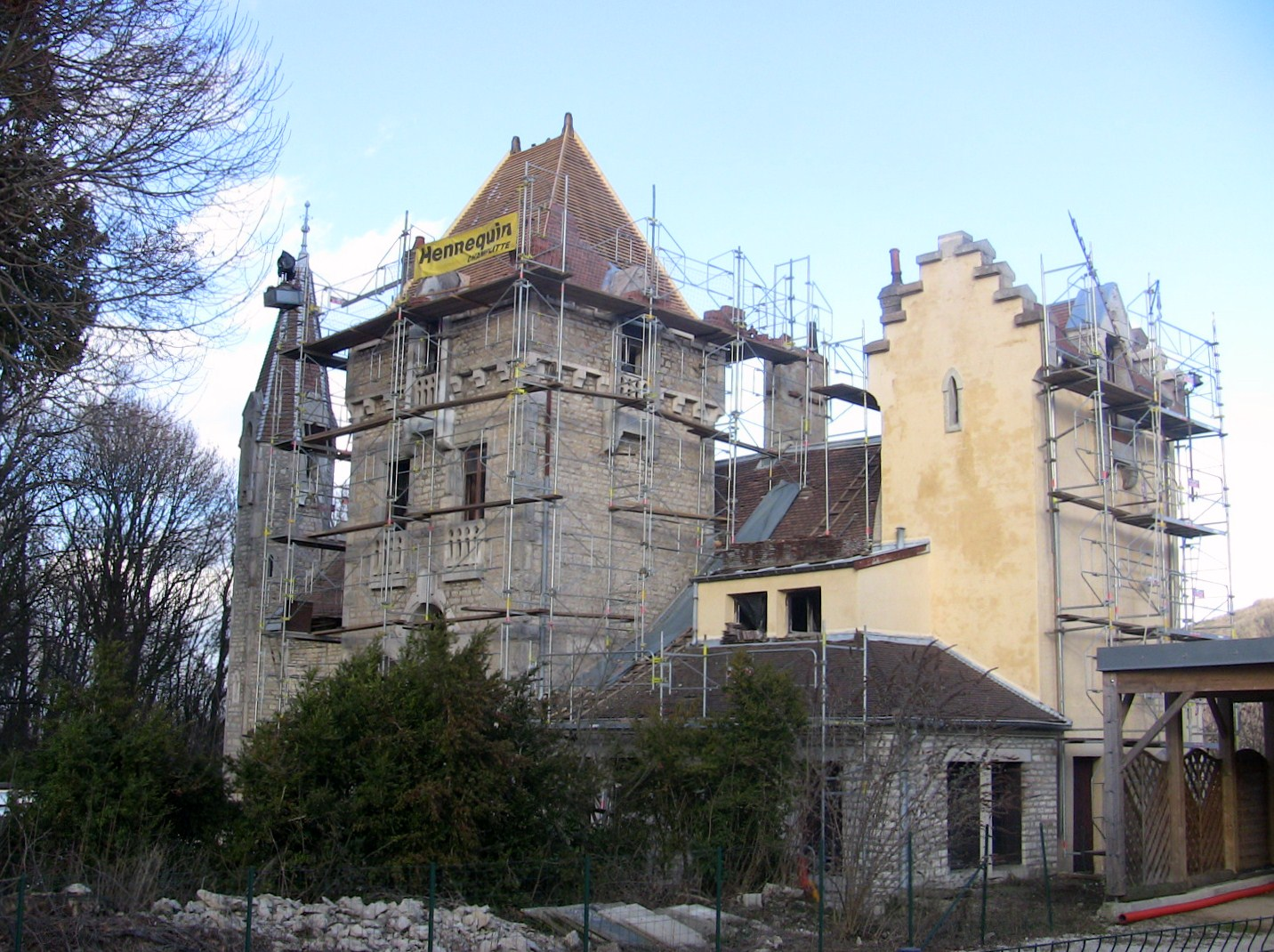
The castel in 2010.

The Château de la Juive (in English: Castle of the Jewess; official name: Château de Clementigney), is a residential château located in the French city of Besançon (Franche-Comté).

The first building was constructed at an unknown date, the earliest information going back to the 18th century. In the 19th century, a rich Jewish family (the Lippmans, founders of the LIP company) bought the house and transformed it into a luxurious villa. Since then, the castle of Clementigney has been known as the castle of the Jewish. From 1850 to 1870, the architect Alphonse Delacroix reconstructed the building in Gothic Revival style. Beginning in the 1920s, the villa accommodated a famous restaurant, up until the early 21st century. Today, the castle is a residential building. It is classified as an official historical monument of France since 2002.
