= Centre-Chapelle des Buis =

La Bucle

- Part of Besançon
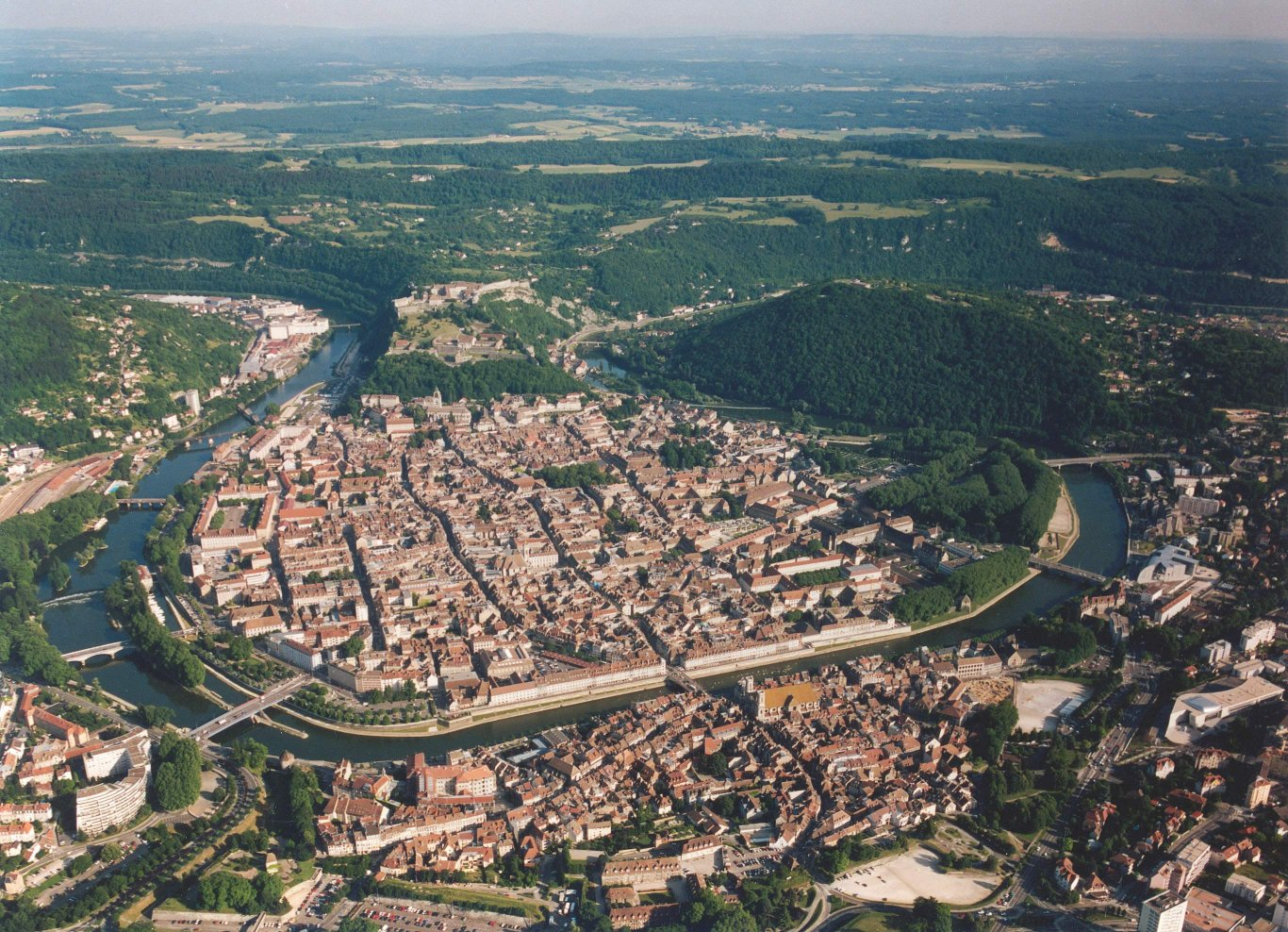
- La Boucle. Aerial view
- Location of Centre-Chapelle des Buis
- Location within France Location within Bourgogne-Franche-Comté
- Coordinates: 47°14′09″N 6°01′34″E
- Country: France
- Region: Bourgogne-Franche-Comté
- Department: Doubs
- Canton: Besançon-5
- Commune: Besançon
- Area^{1}: 4.49 km^{2} (1.73 sq mi)
- Population (2018): 10,659
  - Density: 2,370/km^{2} (6,150/sq mi)
- Time zone: UTC+01:00 (CET)
  - Summer (DST): UTC+02:00 (CEST)
- ^{1} French Land Register data, which excludes lakes, ponds, glaciers > 1 km^{2} (0.386 sq mi or 247 acres) and river estuaries.

Centre-Chapelle des Buis, also known as La Boucle, is the district corresponding to the historic center of the city of Besançon. The name La Boucle comes from the meander of the Doubs in which the city originally developed, and whose very shape is that of a loop (Bucle). Until the second half of the 19th century, this district, along with Battant, was the only part of the city of Besançon, before urban expansion into the surrounding areas. The district had a population of 10,659 habitants in 2018, making it the city's sixth most populous district.

The economic heart of the city, La Boucle is home to the vast majority of the city's shops and services, as well as virtually all government offices. The district boasts around a hundred buildings, dozens of statues and several bridges and squares. The district also includes Citadelle de Besançon, a prominent tourist attraction, welcoming more than 250,000 visitors every year.

== Geography ==
=== Location ===
The Boucle district is located in the heart of Besançon, albeit a little further south than the city's geographic center. It borders la Butte district to the west, the Battant and Chaprais districts to the north, the Bregille district to the east, and the Chapelle-des-Buis and Velotte districts to the south. La Boucle is also close to the commune of Beure to the south-west, and to the communes of Montfaucon and Morre to the south-east.

=== Information ===
The district's name derives from its exceptional location: the Doubs river flows around the Saint-Étienne hill in an almost perfect loop, making the Boucle site a sort of peninsula. In his Commentaries on the Gallic War, Julius Caesar describes the town's site as follows: "its natural position defended it in such a way as to make it a very advantageous point for sustaining war. The Doubs river runs in a circle around it, surrounding it almost entirely; the part that the water does not bathe, and which is no more than six hundred feet high, is protected by a high mountain, the base of which touches the banks of the Doubs on either side ".

The district is surrounded by three imposing hills: Chaudanne Hill (422 m) to the southwest, Saint-Étienne Hill (371 m) to the south and Bregille Hill (460 m) to the southeast. The rest of the district is virtually flat, ideal for the first settlements. La Boucle is also close to the Saint-Étienne forest (which surrounds the hill of the same name) and to the Chaudanne forest, which is nevertheless separated by the Doubs River.

=== Geology ===
The Boucle district is built exclusively on modern alluvium deposited by the Doubs River. In the upper parts of the district, at the foot of the citadel, there are Bathonian limestone elements from the citadel anticline, which dominates the district.

=== Main roads ===
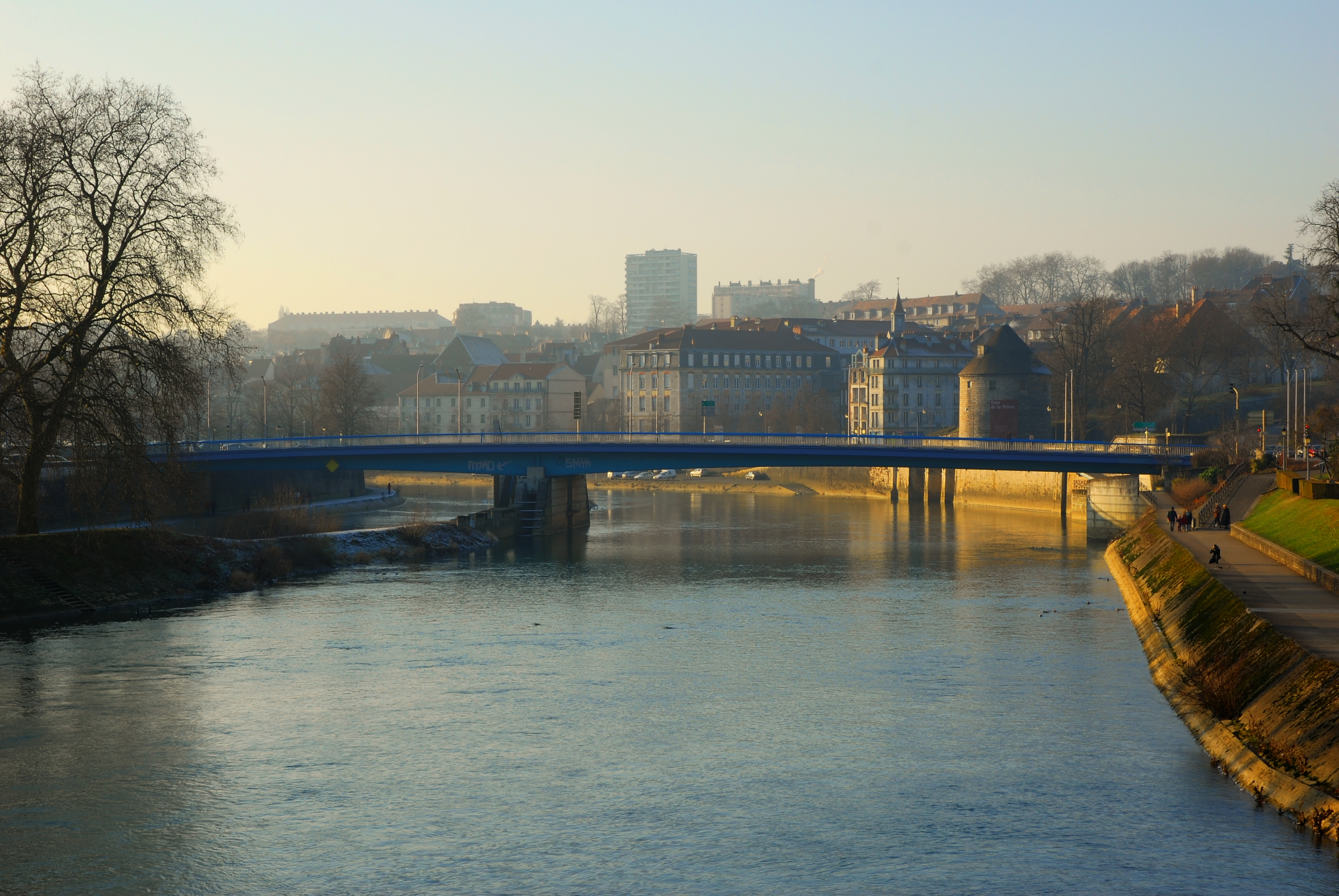
The Robert-Schwint bridge.

The main routes into the city center are : rue de Dole, linking the area to the western districts (La Butte, Saint-Ferjeux, Planoise) and by extension becoming Route nationale 73 linking Besançon to Chalon-sur-Saône, avenue de la septième armée américaine linking la Boucle to Velotte, Planoise and Beure, and by extension becoming Route nationale 83 linking Lyon to Strasbourg, route de Morre, linking the district to the communes of Morre, Montfaucon and the surrounding area, which by extension becomes Route nationale 57 linking Metz to Ballaigues (Switzerland); rue de Vesoul, linking the Boucle to Saint-Claude and the Espace Valentin, which by extension becomes route départementale 484 linking Besançon to Chalèze; rue de Belfort, linking the area to Palente and Chalezeule, as well as to the ZAC des Marnières.

The main thoroughfares are Grande rue and rue des Granges. A large part of the area is car-free. The district also boasts six bridges: pont Battant, pont de Bregille, pont Canot, pont Charles-de-Gaulle, pont de la République and pont Robert-Schwint, as well as a footbridge: passerelle de Chardonnet.

The Loop also includes five parking lots: the Chamars parking lot (1,200 spaces), the Mairie parking lot (600 spaces), the Marché Beaux-Arts/Cusenier parking lot (1,130 spaces), the Petit Chamars parking lot (80 spaces) and the Saint-Paul parking lot (260 spaces).

There are also three tunnels that cross the Saint-Étienne hill, allowing you to go from east to west of the hill without having to go around it (between Rivotte and Tarragnoz): the river tunnel (bored in 1882), the railway tunnel (called the "tacot" tunnel) and the road tunnel opened at the end of 2000.

=== Segmentation ===
The downtown area is divided into eight sectors (considering that the islands of Saint-Paul and Saint-Pierre form only one sector between them). The district has gradually expanded, firstly comprising the historic sectors (la Boucle, including the islands and Saint-Jean), then secondary extensions (Chamars, la Gare-d'Eau, Rivotte, Tarragnoz) and finally tertiary extensions (la Chapelle-des-Buis).

==== Saint-Jean ====
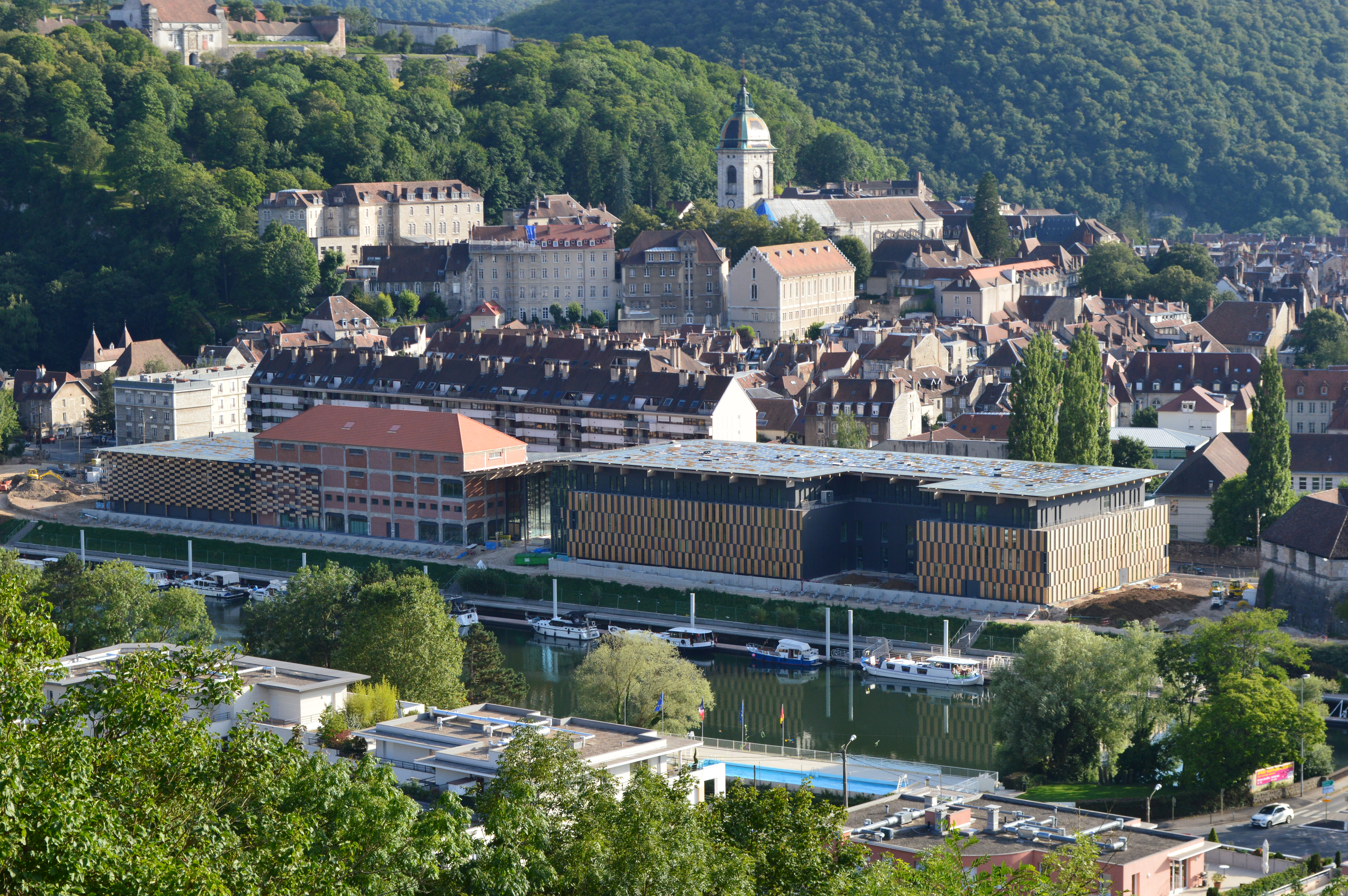
The Saint-Jean sector.

Saint-Jean has been a part of the Boucle since Roman Gaul. But a much older monument proves that the area occupied an important place as early as ancient Rome: the Porte Noire, dated between 171 and 175 CE. In addition to this almost thousand-year-old gateway, the Square Castan, which may have been a raised esplanade, dates from the 1st or 2nd century AD. Saint-Jean Cathedral, the city's only cathedral and one of the jewels of Bisontin's heritage, was also built in this area in 814 AD.

The Saint-Jean site lies to the west of the Boucle district, partly on the stepped slopes of Mont Saint-Étienne. It was the former capitular quarter, grouping together all the important buildings (mainly religious).

==== La chapelle des Buis ====
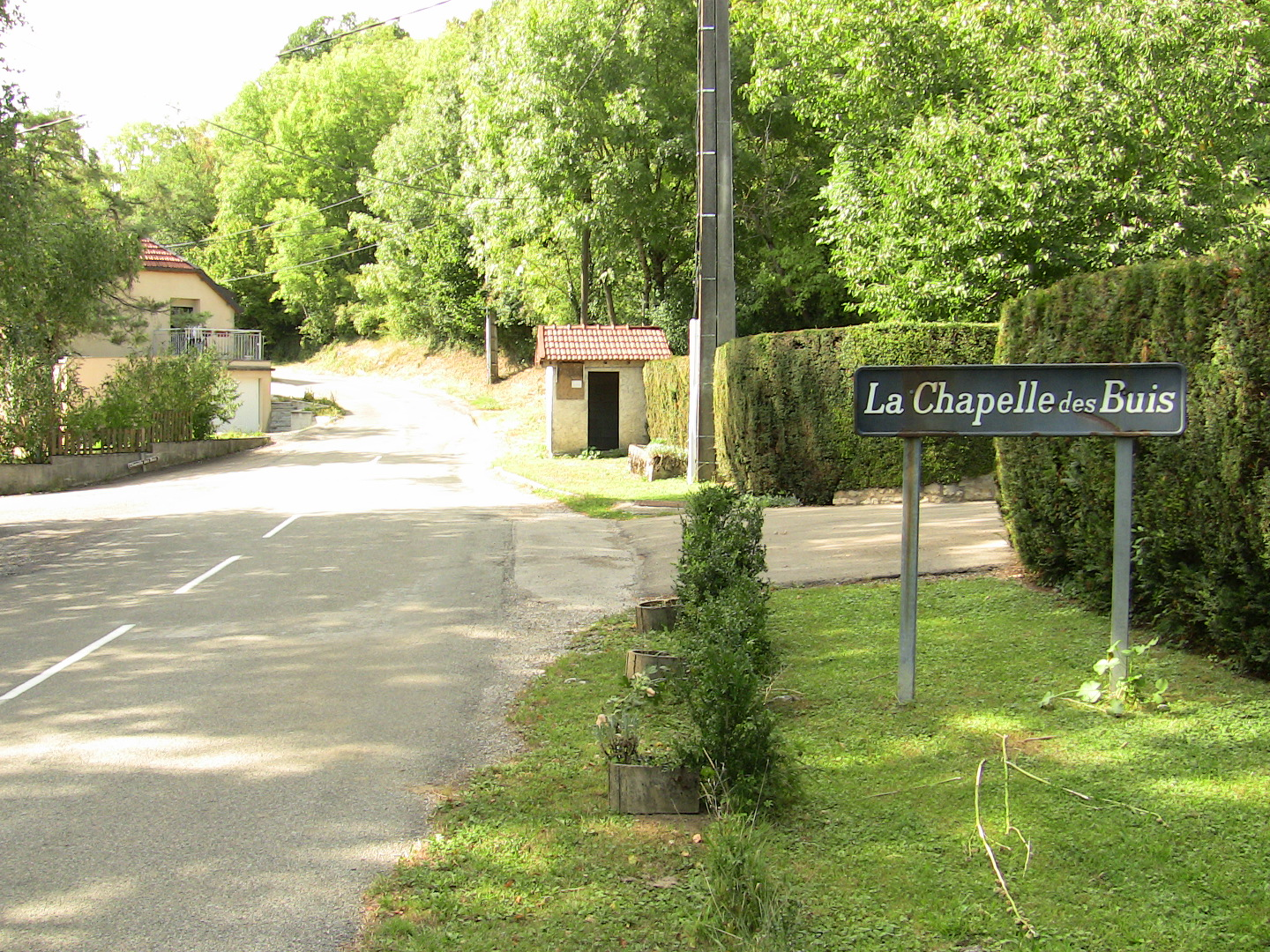
La Chapelle-des-Buis

La Chapelle-des-Buis is officially a locality, but the site is managed by the city of Besançon, located in the heart of the Saint-Etienne hill. The area is known for the monuments that stand at over 400 meters above sea level, notably the chapelle Notre-Dame des Buis and Notre-Dame de la Libération, the latter a fort rehabilitated as a place of worship in memory of the victims of the Second World War.

The first traces of life on the site date back to Roman times, with a permanent presence in the 5th century, when Saint Leonard is said to have lived in a cave not far from the site as a hermit. Even today, La Chapelle-des-Buis remains a remote, sparsely populated area, mostly forested.

==== Rivotte ====
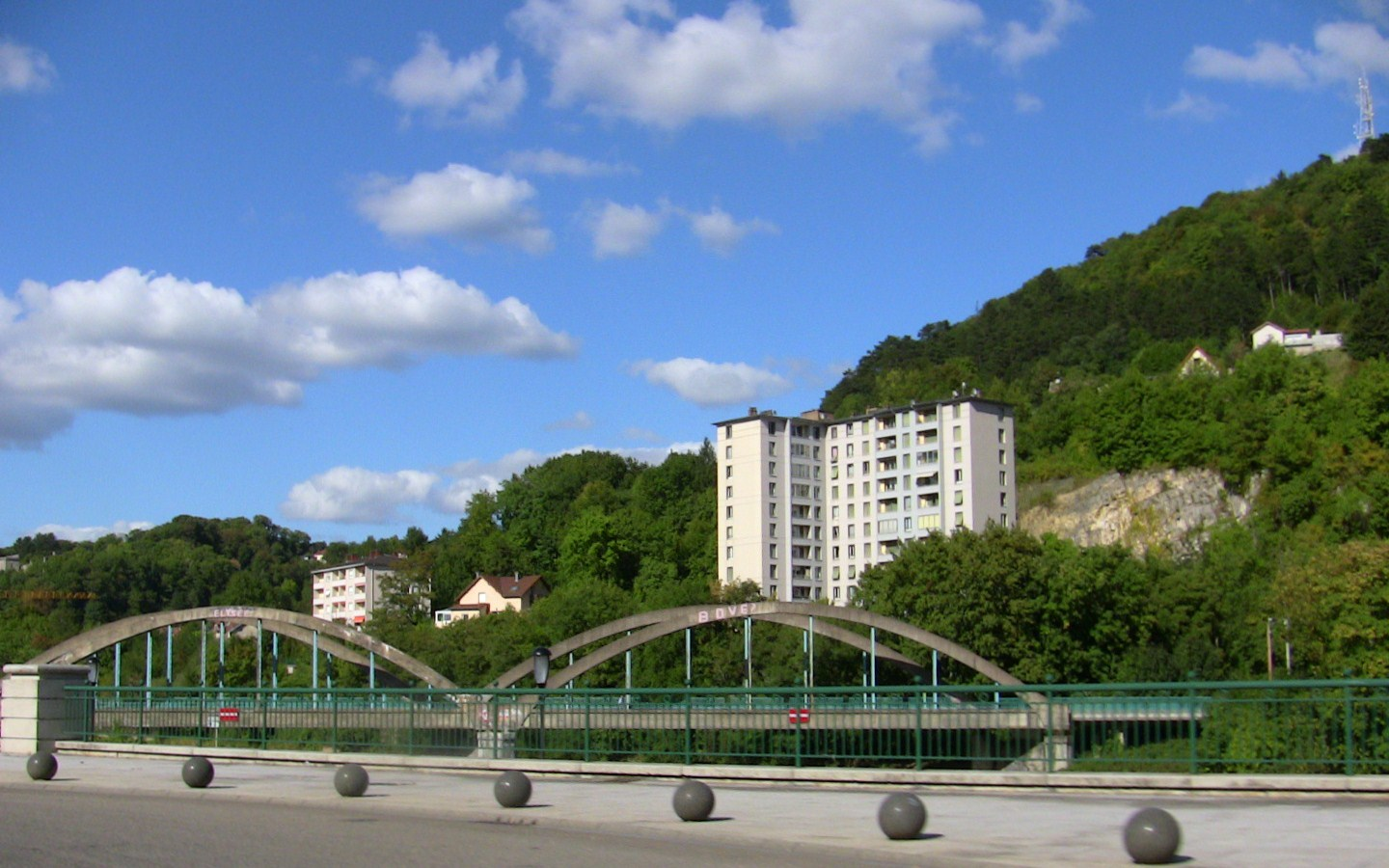
Rivotte

Rivotte is a small area to the west of the Boucle, on one bank of the Doubs. Its name may derive from the contraction of "rive" and "haute", given that only 30 meters separate the Doubs river from the steep slopes of Mont Saint-Étienne. The site has been occupied since Roman times, with the construction of the Carved Gate linking the ancient site of Vesontio to Switzerland.

There are no precise dates for the urbanization of this small area, but it seems that Tarragnoz was simply an expansion of the town center, with the first buildings dating from at least the 15th century. In the past, the Porte de Malpas gateway, which had existed since at least the 11th century, was located on today's Route Nationale 83, between Tarragnoz and Velotte, but was demolished in 1893 to allow the creation of a wider road linking the two areas. There was also a mill, destroyed at the turn of the century.

==== La Gare-d'Eau ====
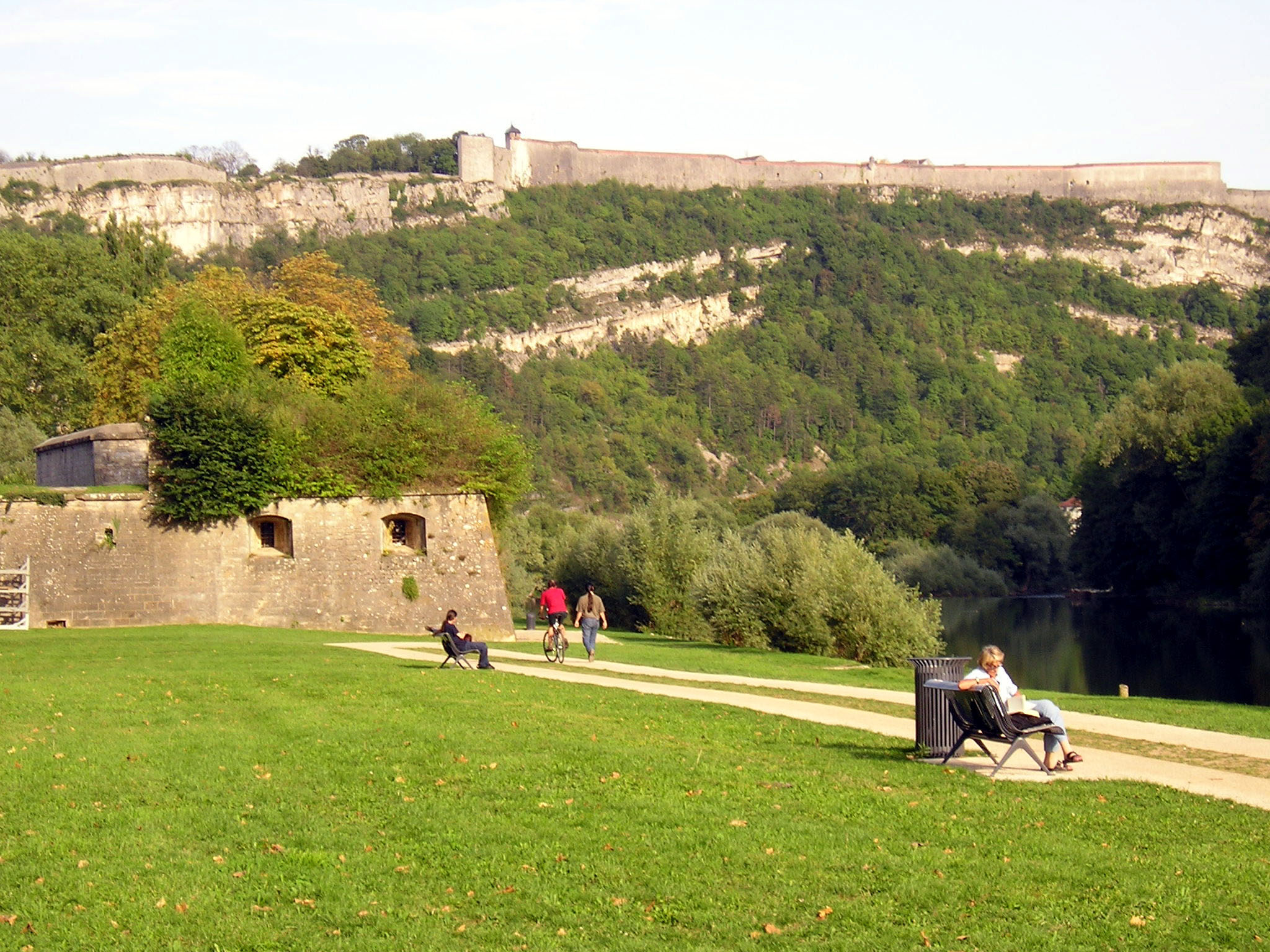
La Gare d'Eau

The Gare-d'Eau area was established in the 17th century on former drained marshland and laid out as a French-style promenade. After the siege of 1674, the area underwent a metamorphosis, with the fortifications gradually giving way to Vauban's fortifications. In the 19th century, the city underwent a period of commercial expansion that boosted river transport until the beginning of the 20th century. The area's modest dock was transformed into a full-fledged port. From the 20th century until the early 1970s, the site was gradually abandoned.

In the early 1970s, the French government decided to build an administrative complex in the heart of the Gare-d'Eau. In 1973, the project officially began with the filling-in of the basin. After a large number of Bisontins protested against the construction, the project was finally abandoned in 1978. However, the government decided to place a number of public buildings on the site, including the police headquarters and the chamber of commerce. At the same time, the France 3 Franche-Comté television station moved into the premises known as de la Poudrière.

Since the 1980s, the site has been open to walkers, and the Gare-d'Eau park has once again become a genuine green space. Since 2002, the Mots Doubs literary festival has been held in the area.

==== Chamars ====
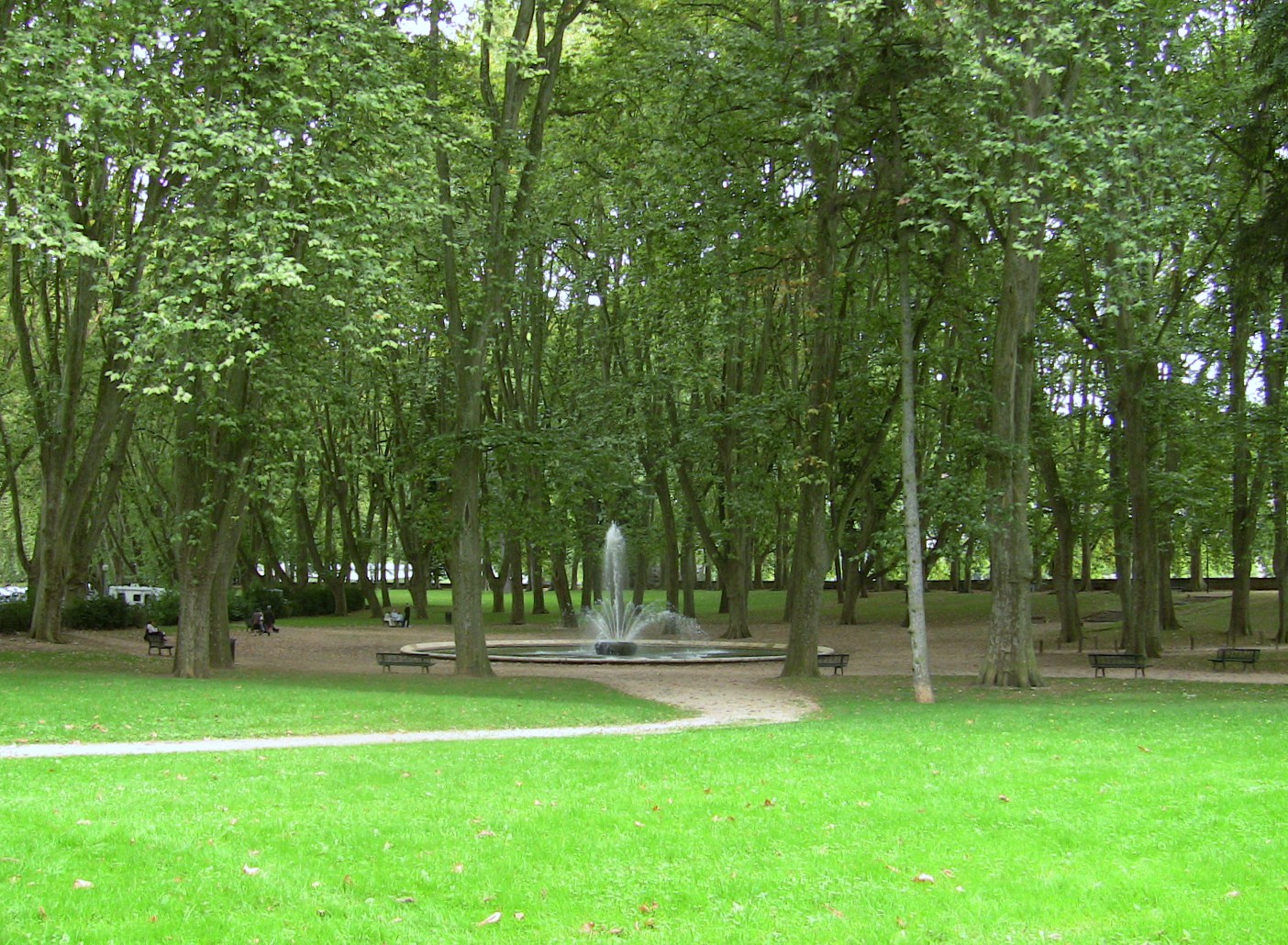
Chamars green park

Chamars is an area in the southwest of the Boucle, on one bank of the Doubs. The site is divided into two parts: one is a green space, the other is Besançon's largest parking lot, the Chamars parking lot. The area has also been occupied since Roman times, and was mainly used as farmland until the 18th century. It was during this same century that the site underwent a profound metamorphosis, notably with the fortifications built by Vauban, and the restructuring of the area into gardens in the mid-nineteenth century.

==== Îles Saint-Paul et Saint-Pierre ====
Île Saint-Paul

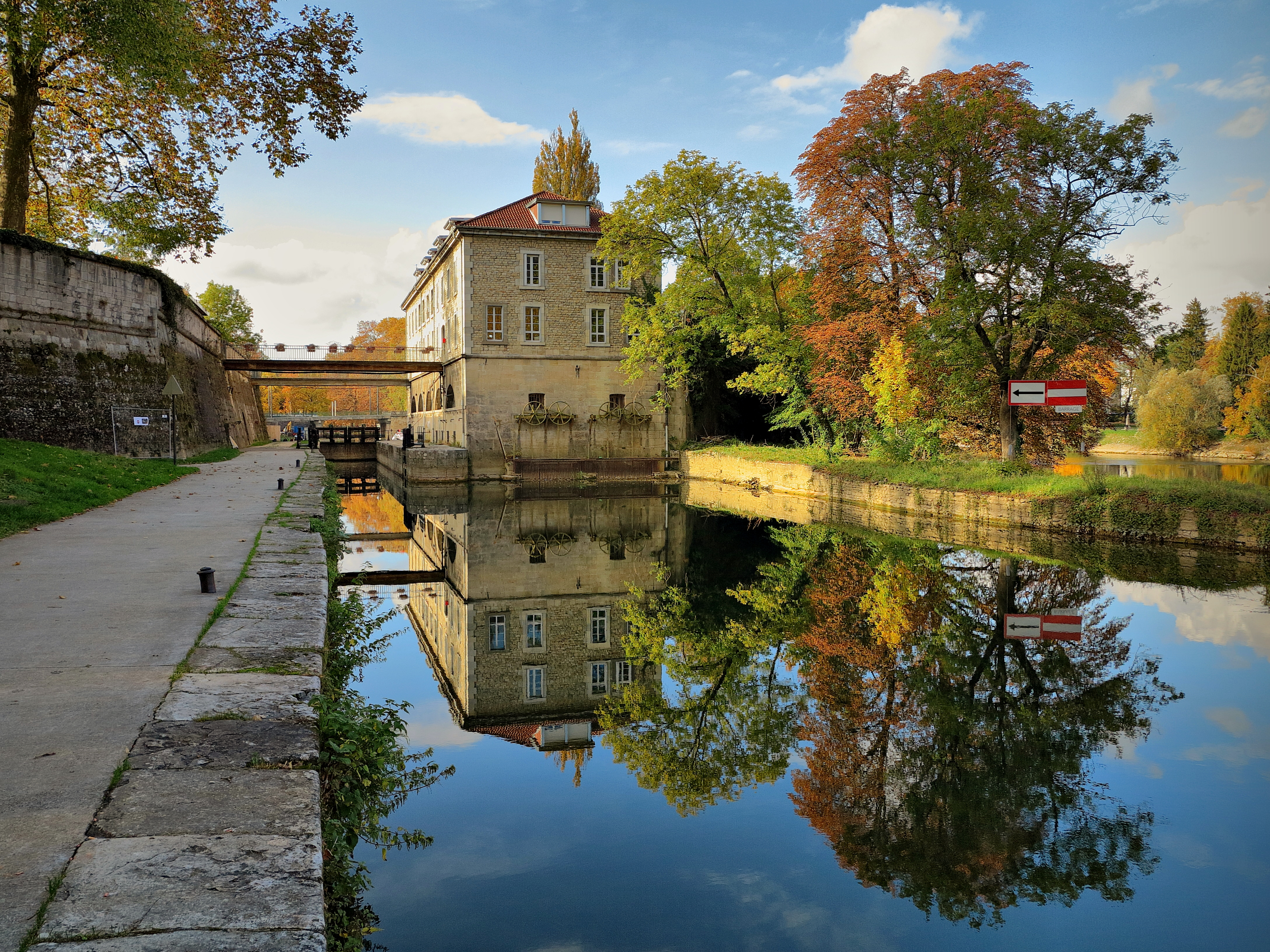
The Saint-Paul mill and its lock.

The island is located in the Boucle district, close to Île Saint-Pierre. It is a river port, belonging to the voies navigables de France (VNF). The Saint-Paul mill is located on this island.

Île Saint-Pierre

The island is located between avenue d'Helvétie and avenue Élisée-Cusenier. Among other features, it is home to Bisont's Minotaur fountain.

== History ==
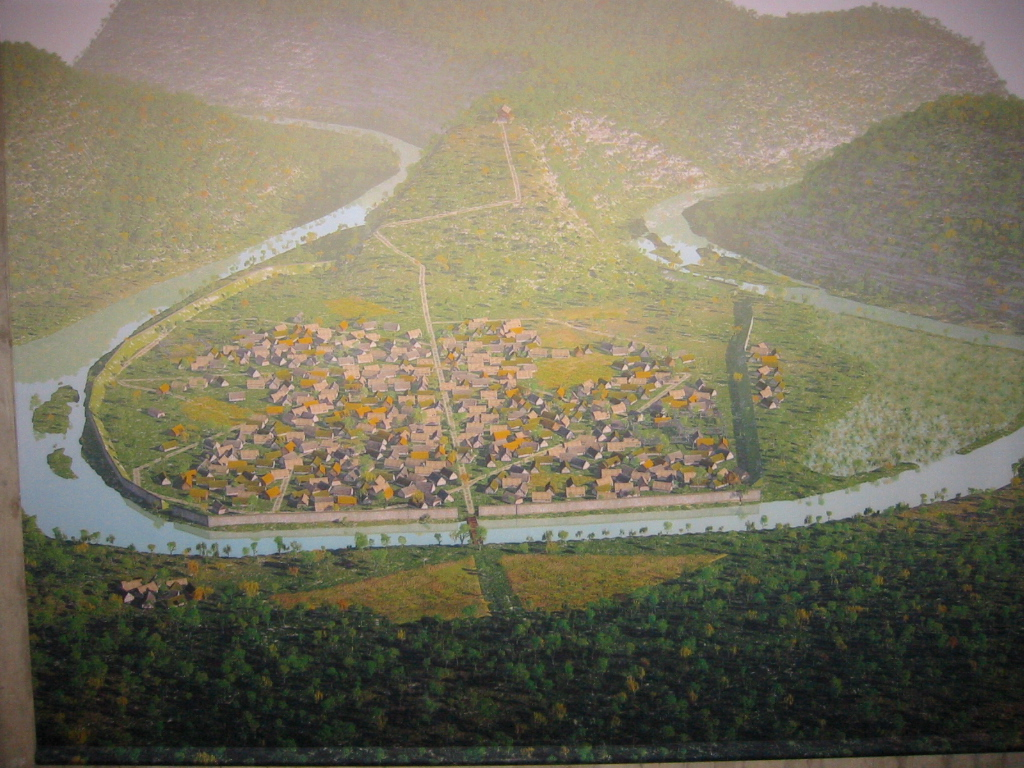
Gallic Besançon

The history of Besançon is closely linked to the Boucle district. Indeed, until the 19th century, the area was one of the only parts of the city, along with Battant. In short, the history of Besançon is the history of the Boucle until the 1950s, before neighboring villages were annexed or new districts were built.

=== Prehistory ===
La Boucle site has been occupied by hunter-gatherers since prehistoric times, at least 50,000 years ago. The site was also inhabited by Celts more than 5,000 years BC. At the time, it was known as Vesontio, the main settlement in the territory occupied by the Sequans.

=== Antiquity and the Middle Ages ===
In 68 AD, the Romans enlarged and embellished the city, building numerous edifices on either side of today's Grande Rue.

In 175 AD, Marcus Aurelius erected the Porte Noire to commemorate the suppression of the troubles of 172–175 AD. Shortly afterwards, Square Castan was built in the Saint-Jean area. In 1032, Besançon became part of the Holy Roman Empire.

== Demographic evolution ==
Population development
1999	2010	2011	2018
10 796	11 606	10 803	10 659

Source: CCAS

IRIS	Population (2018)	Annual variation 2010–2018	Population (2010)	Annual variation 1999–2010	Population (1999)
Chamars	3 047	– 0.73%	3 237	0.96%	2 927
Sarrail	2 139	– 1.22%	3 117	0.52%	2 948
Citadelle	2 427	– 0.98%	2 320	0.58%	2 181
République	2 813	– 1.06%	2 652	0.61%	2 486
Chapelle des Buis	234	– 2.09%	281	0.97%	254

== Economy ==
La Boucle is the city's economic heart and, along with Châteaufarine, one of its main commercial sectors. The area is home to the majority of the city's small and medium-sized retailers, as well as all the "specialty" stores (gun shops, numismatics, most bookshops, etc.).

However, there is no shopping center in the district, apart from the Lafayette shopping mall and a Monoprix store. To revitalize the town center and create a commercial space to meet the growing demand of the population, the municipality has raised the possibility of building a covered market comprising four to five medium-sized and/or large stores right in the heart of Place Pasteur (Grande rue). Work to redevelop the square began at the end of 2007, with construction of the shopping center scheduled to follow in the next few years.

Bisontinental tourism also takes place mainly in the Boucle district. The most visited monuments are located in this district, such as the Besançon Citadel (250,000 visitors per year, the most visited monument in the region), the Musée des Beaux-Arts et d'Archéologie de Besançon (around 60,000 visitors per year) and the Musée de la Résistance et de la Déportation (around 55,000 visitors a year).

== Transport ==
La Boucle is served by a large part of the Ginko urban network, which links it to the other districts of Besançon and its conurbation:

- Besançon tramway and its lines: T1 and T2
- Regular bus routes: L3, L4, L5, L6, 9 ,10, 11, 12, 21, 23, 24, 26
- Suburban lines: 81, 82, 83, 84, 85, 86
- Ginko Citadelle line
- Ginko Diabolo lines D1 and D2

In addition to public transport, the district is also served by a cab rank and the VéloCité network. The Besançon tramway, linking Planoise to the Marnières area, has been passing through the Boucle (via Chamars and Place de la Révolution) since 2014.

== Heritage and administrative buildings ==
=== Remarkable monuments ===
The Boucle preserves a significant part of the architectural heritage of Besançon, with eleven places of worship, fifteen military buildings, twelve townhouses and around eight other buildings. Parts of the public domain, such as the Pont Battant and Place de la Révolution, further contribute to the Boucle's historic fabric. Pieces of the district have been classified as a protected area since 1994.

==== Religious heritage ====
- Besançon Cathedral
- Synagogue of Besançon
- Saint-Pierre church
- Notre-Dame-du-Foyer chapel
- Église Saint-Maurice
- Église Saint-François-Xavier
- Notre-Dame Church
- Temple of the Holy Spirit of Besançon
- Saint-Paul Abbey
- St. Stephen's Cathedral, Besançon
- Notre-Dame des Buis (Chapelle des Buis)
- Our Lady of Liberation
- Chapelle de la Visitation

==== Military heritage ====
- Citadel of Besançon
- Porte Noire
- Porte Rivotte
- Porte taillée
- Chamars guardhouse
- Tour Notre-Dame
- Bregille Tower
- Chamars Tower
- Cordeliers Tower
- Tour du Marais
- Rivotte Tower
- Ruty barracks
- Fort de trois Châtels
- Fort Tousey

==== Private hotels ====
- Hotel de Montmartin
- Mareschal Hotel
- Hotel de ville
- Hotel Alvizet
- Petit de Marivat Hotel
- Hotel Pourcheresse d'Etrabonne
- Hotel Terrier-Santans
- Hotel Isabey
- Lavernette Hotel
- Hôtel des postes

==== Roads ====
- Besançon bridges
- Battant Bridge
- Place de la Révolution
- Place du 8-Septembre
- Grande rue
- Rue des Granges

==== Others ====
- Besançon Conservatory
- Palais Granvelle
- Collège Victor-Hugo
- Besançon Arena
- Parlement of Besançon
- Besançon Casino
- Saint-Jacques Hospital
- Astronomical clock
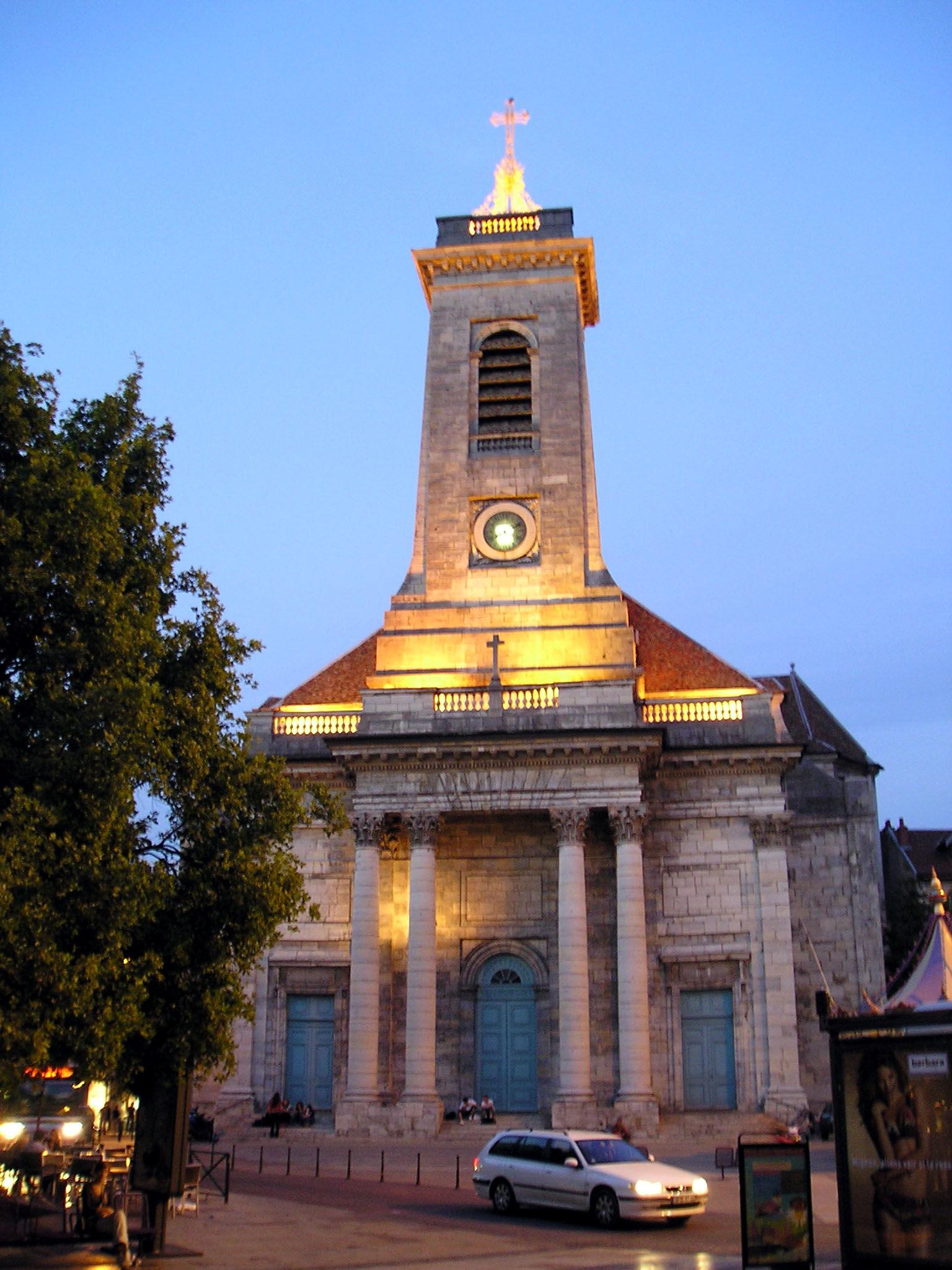
Saint-Pierre church

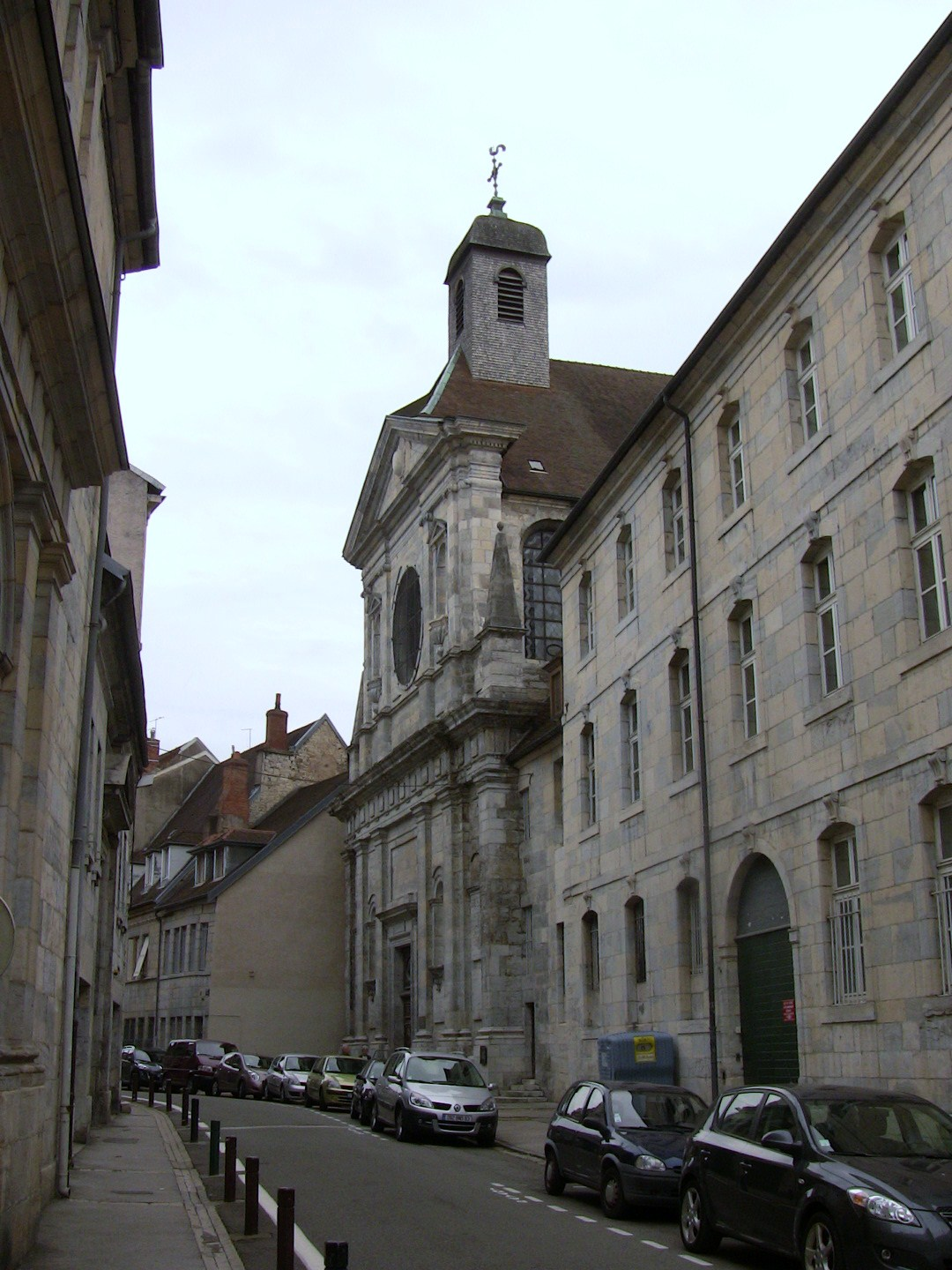
Saint-François-Xavier church

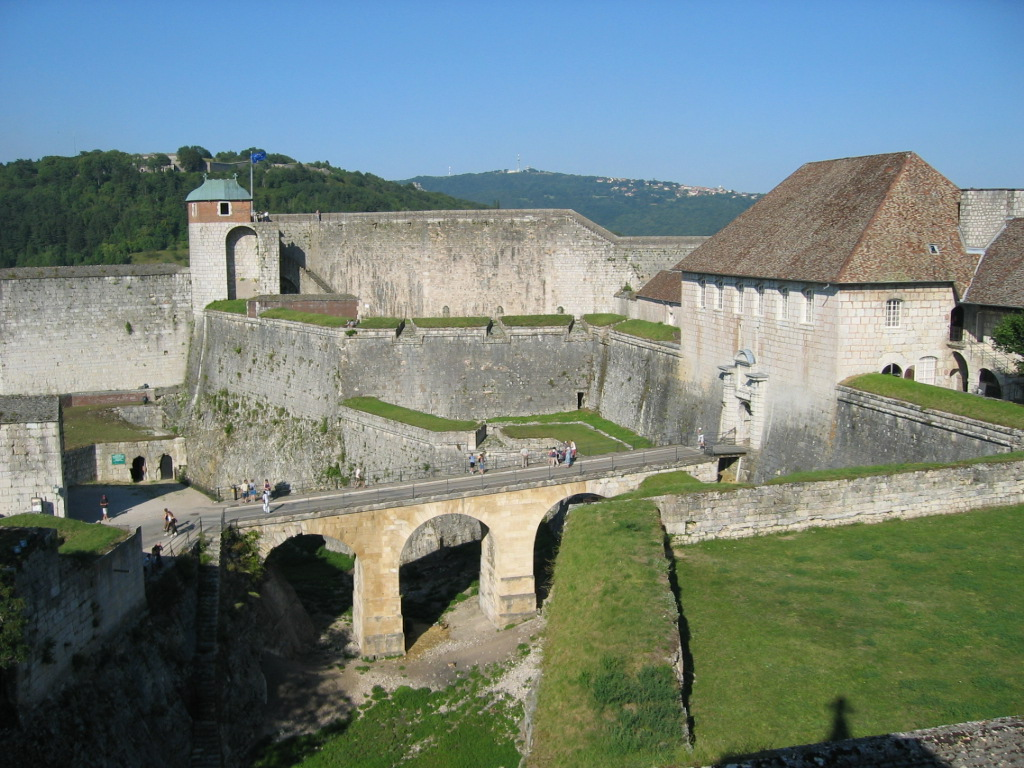
Citadel of Besançon

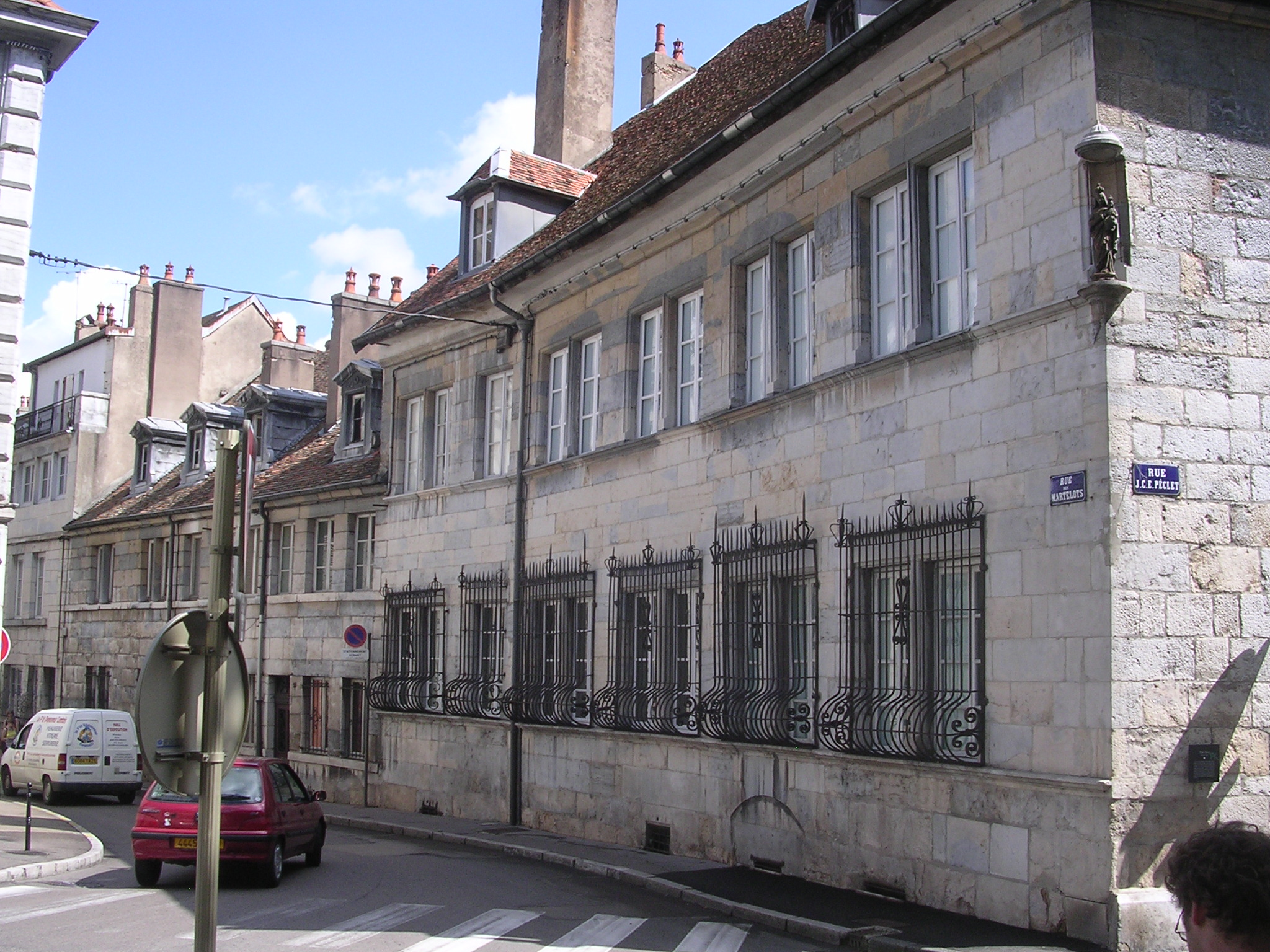
Alviset Hotel

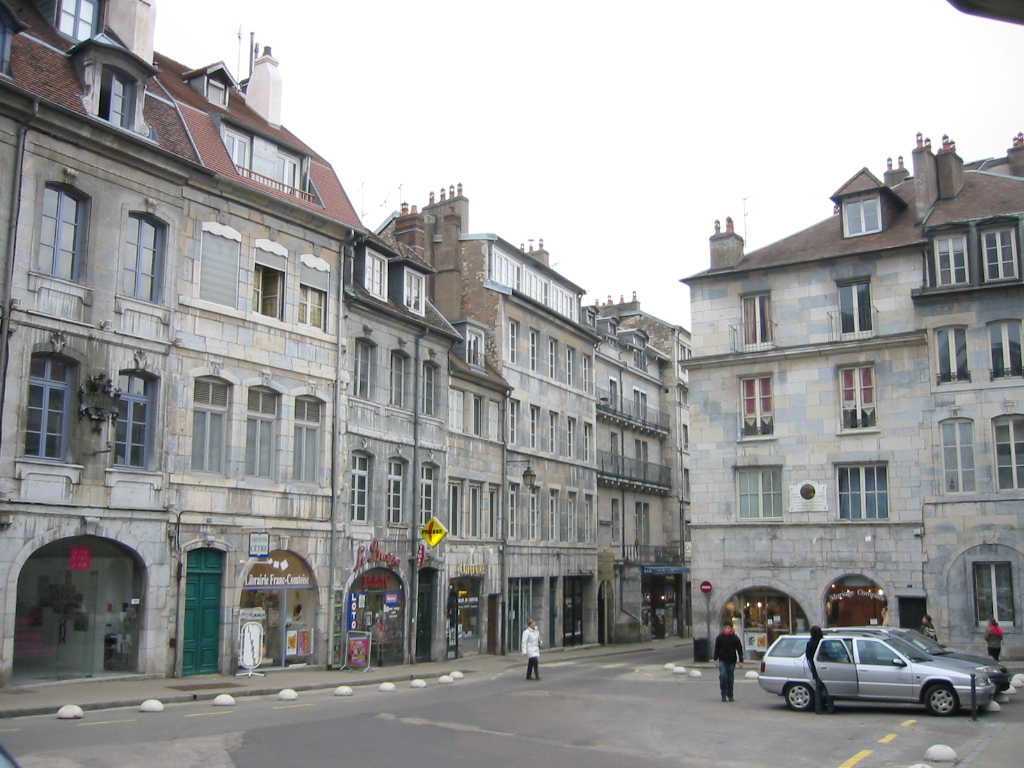
Place Victor Hugo

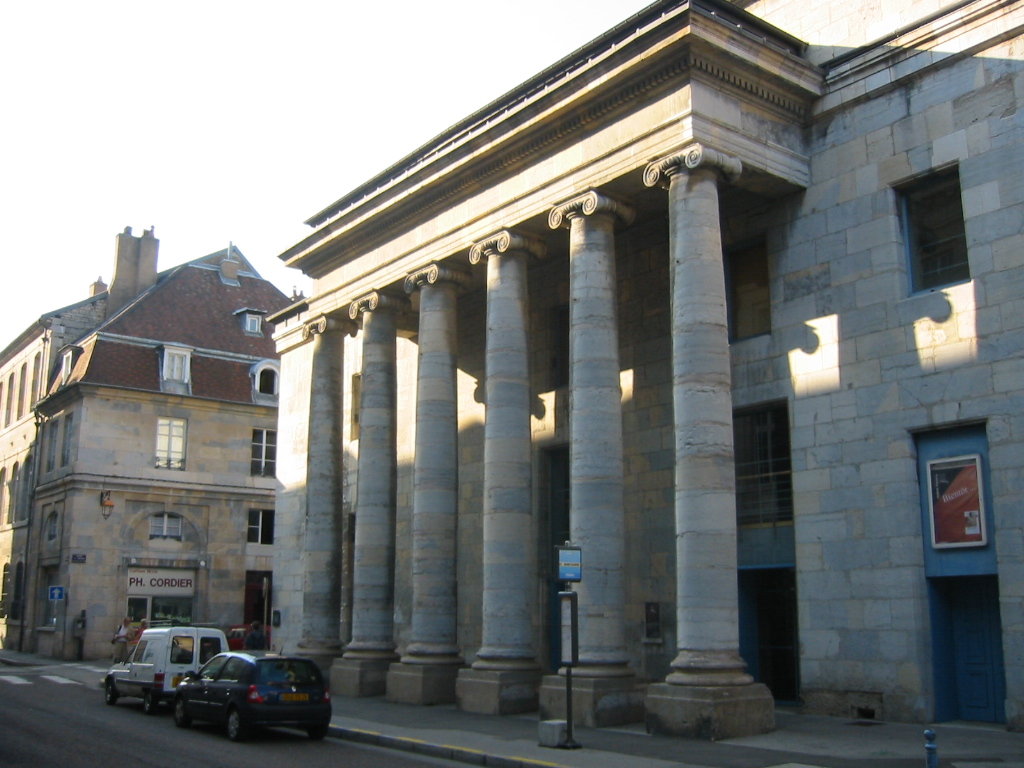
Theatre Besancon

=== Ornamental heritage ===
La Boucle is also home to a large number of statues and fountains. Dozens of statues, notably of the Virgin Mary, can be seen at the buildings on Grande rue, and there are also thirteen fountains.

Statues :

- Statue of the Minotaur (île Saint-Pierre)
- Jouffroy d'Abbans statue (avenue d'Helvétie)
- Victor Hugo statue (Parc Granvelle)
- Victor Hugo statue (esplanade des droits de l'homme, town hall)
- Vauban statue (Citadel of Besançon)
- Hilaire de Chardonnet memorial (Pont de la République)
- Becquet bust (promenade Micaud)
- Le Témoin (Citadel of Besançon)
- La Charité (Temple du Saint-Esprit, Besançon)
- Statue of Louis Duplain (rue du Chapitre)
- Vases by Boutry (Chamars)

Fountains :

- Eaux d'Arcier fountain (Place de la Révolution)
- Fontaine de l'État-Major (Place Jean-Cornet)
- Fontaine des Carmes (Grande rue)
- Place du Huit septembre fountain
- Place Pasteur fountain
- Chamars fountain
- Promenade Granvelle fountain
- Saint-Quentin fountain (place Victor-Hugo)
- Fontaine Pasteur (rue du lycée)
- Delta du Doubs (Tarragnoz and Rivotte traffic circles)
- Statue-fountain in Square Saint-Amour
- Fontaine des Dames (rue de la Préfecture)
- Fontaine du Doubs (rue Ronchaux)

Others:

- Carrousel on Place du Huit Septembre
- Granvelle promenade kiosk
- Kiosk in Parc Micaud
- Mural of the Lumière brothers
- Mural of Pasteur
- Mural of Victor Hugo
- Mural by Gustave Courbet
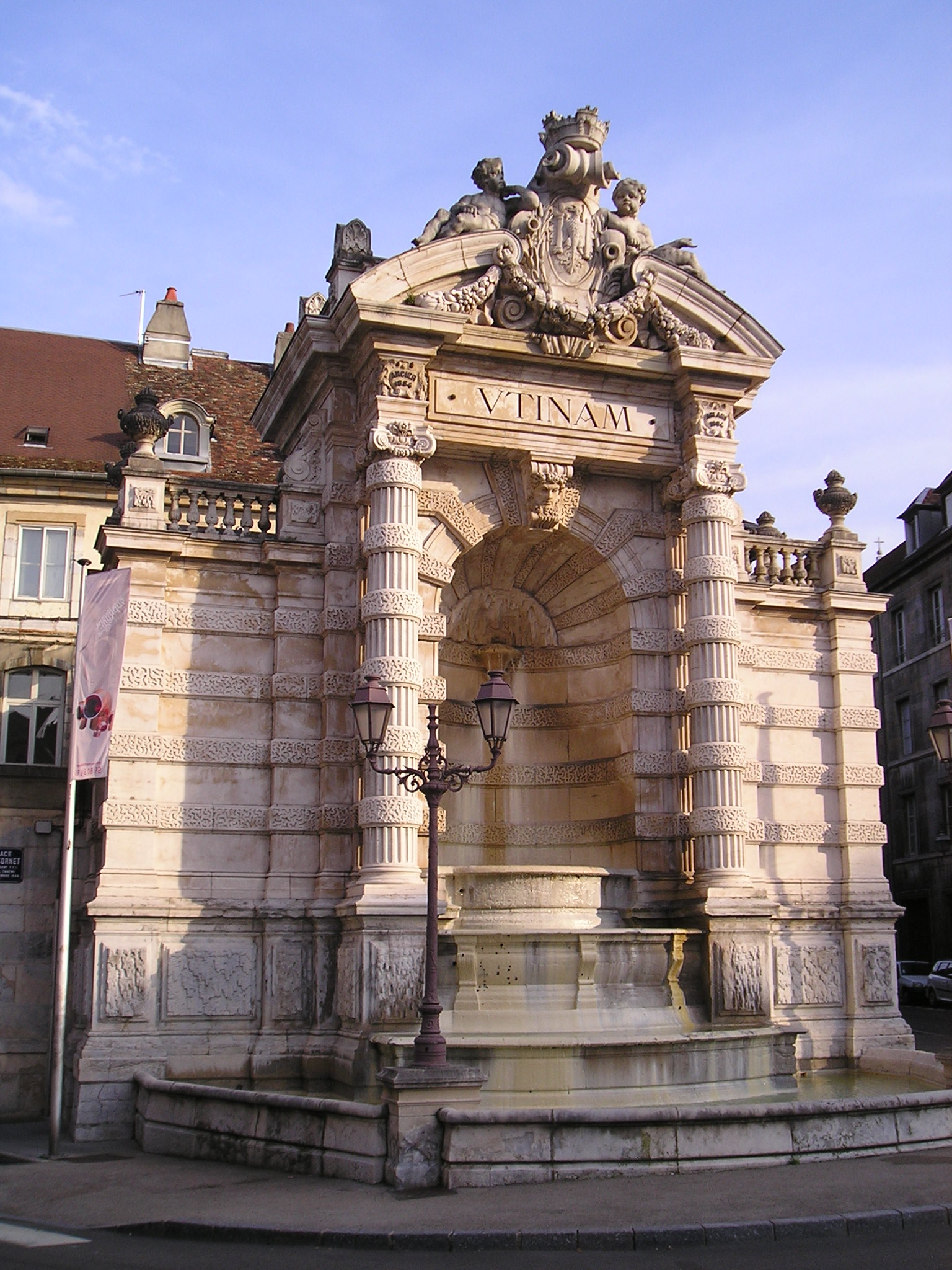
Place Cornet fountain

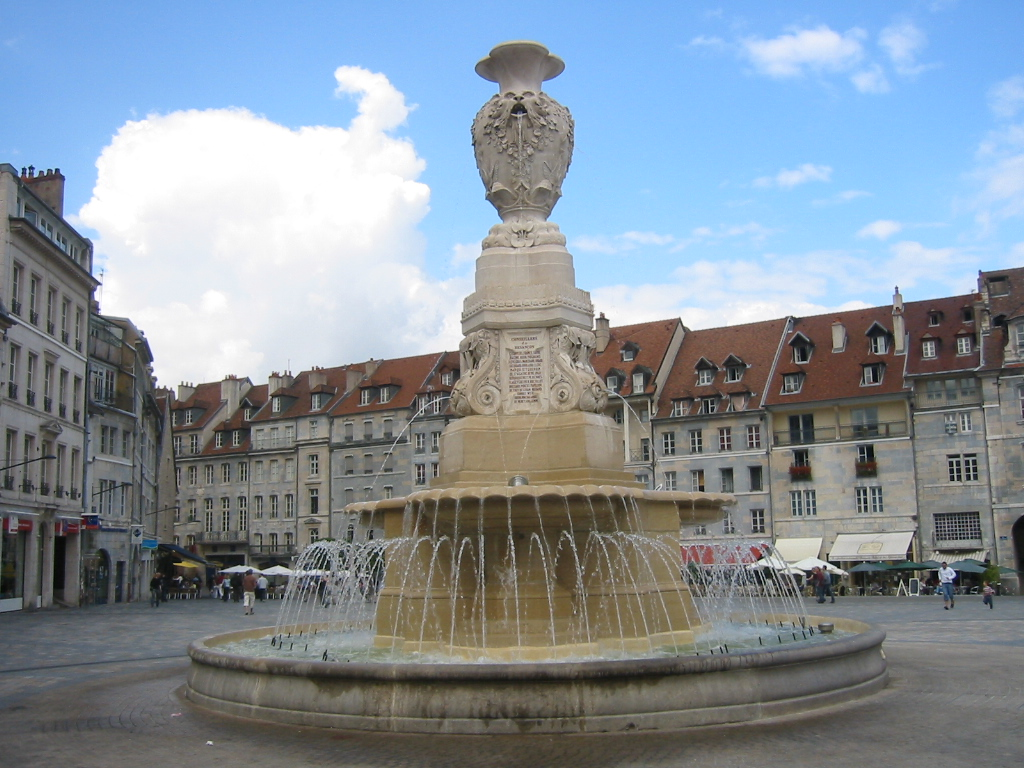
Fountain de la Place de la Révolution

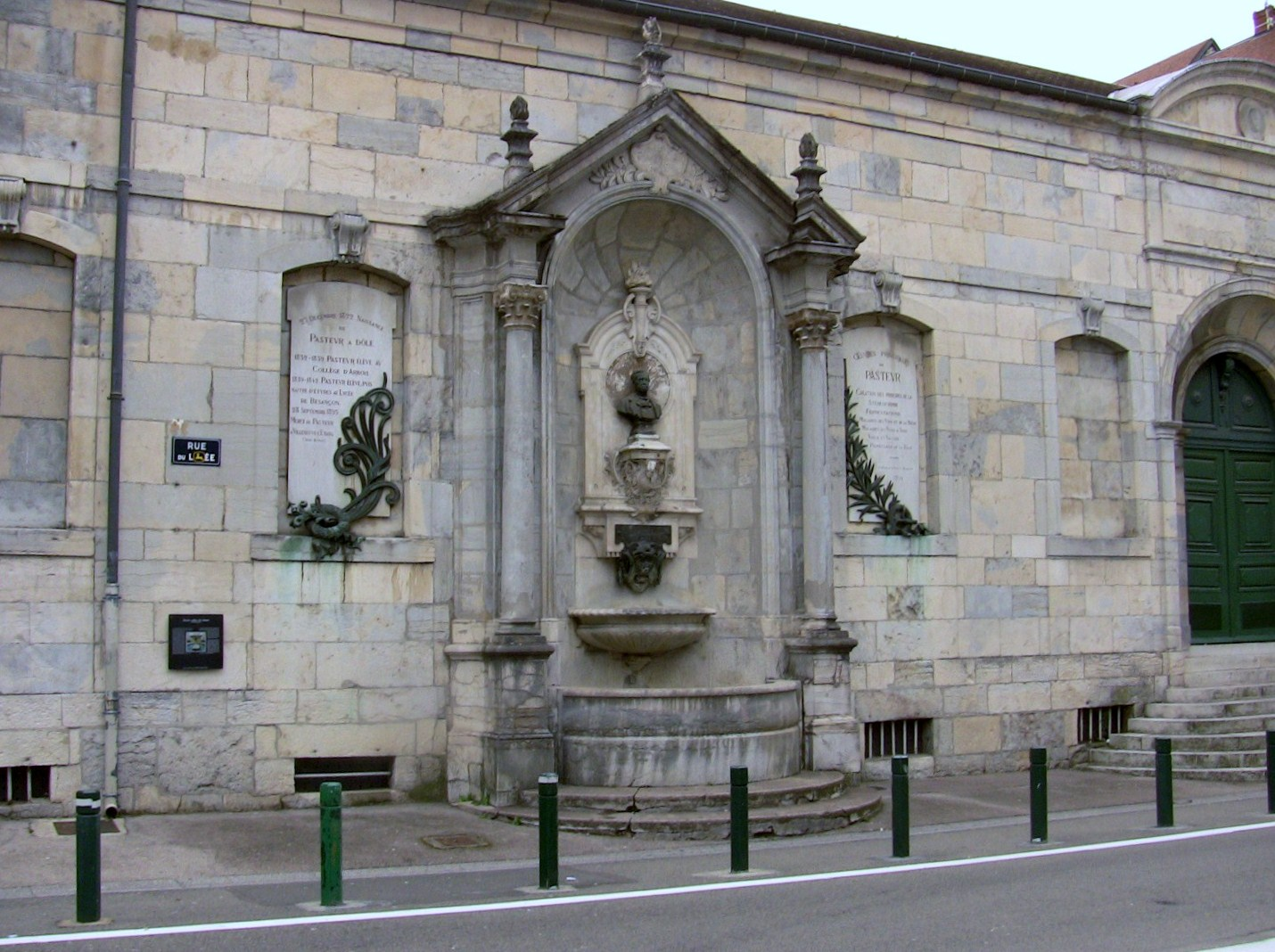
Fontaine Pasteur

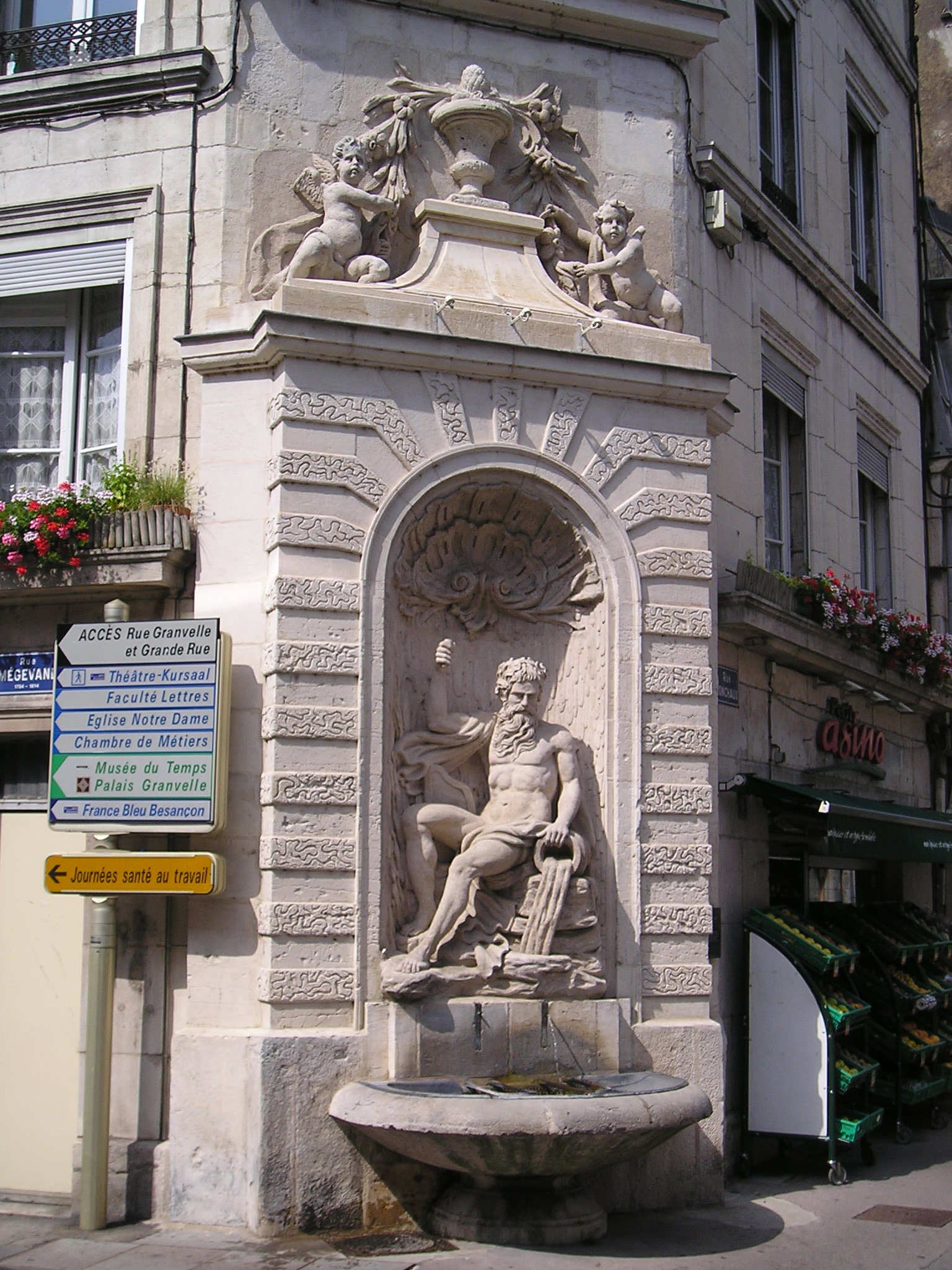
Fontaine du Doubs

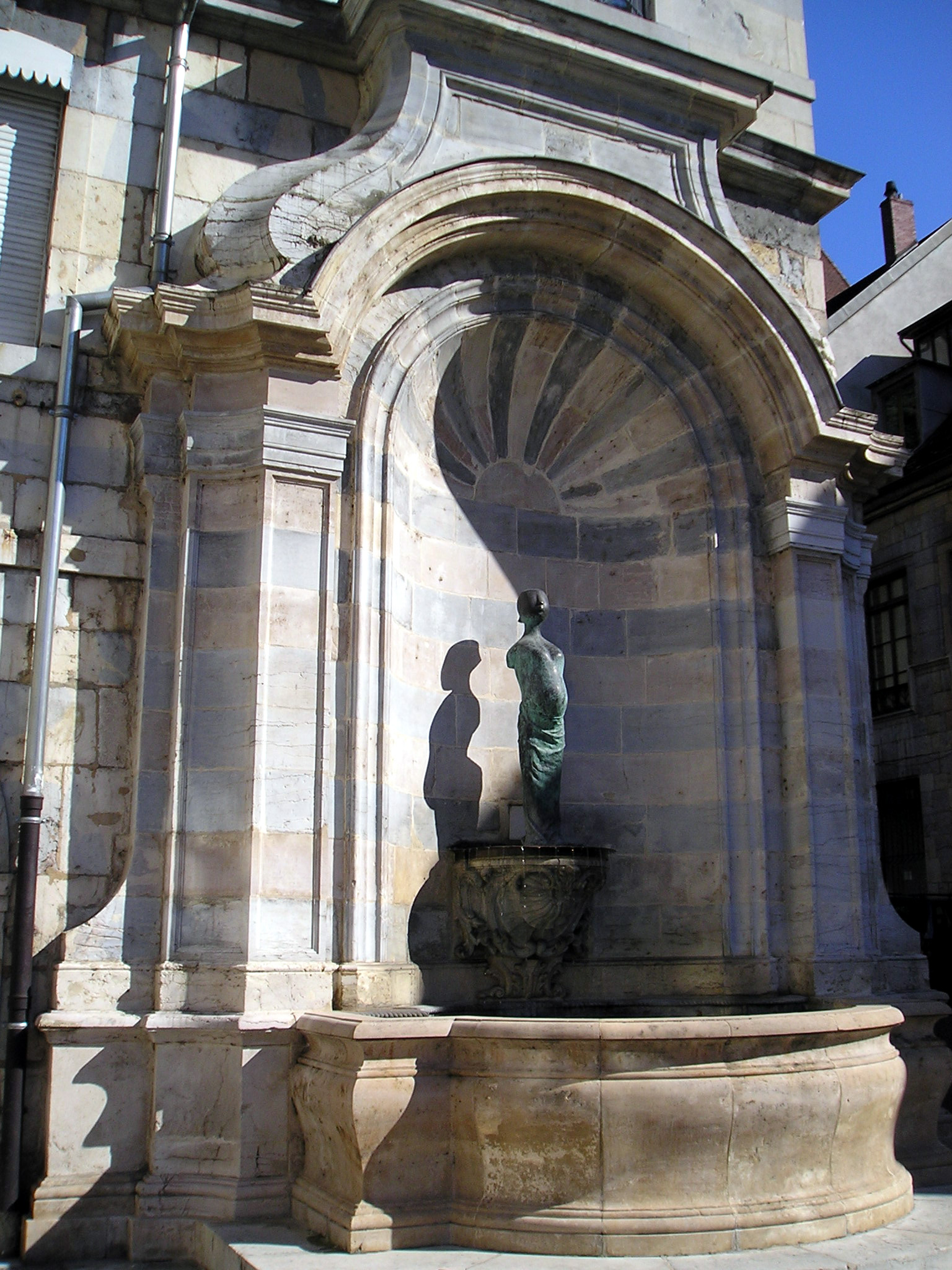
Fontaine Saint-Quentin

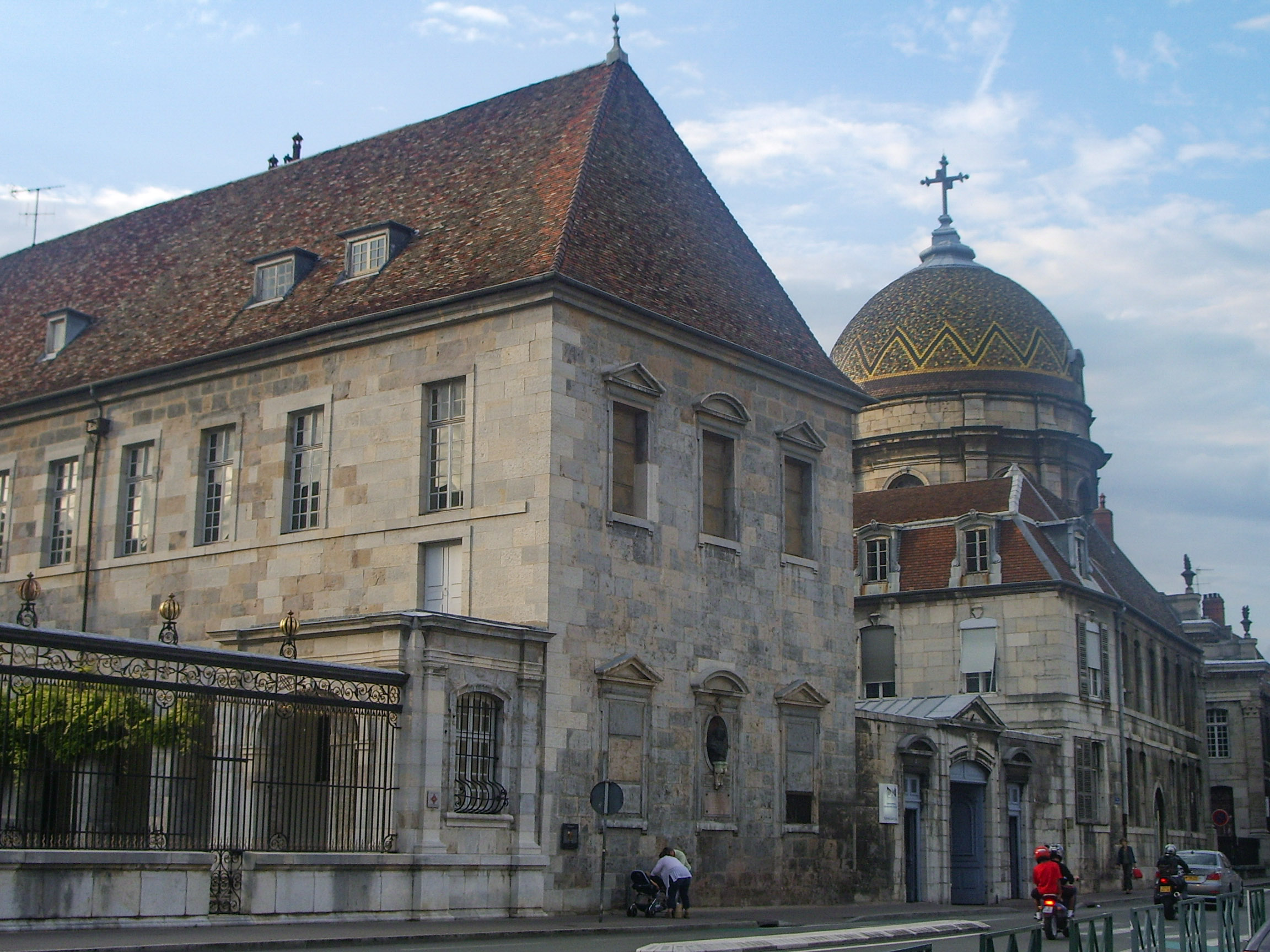
Saint-Jacques Hospital

=== Administrative buildings ===
- Besançon Court of Appeal
- Besançon Law Courts
- Parlement of Besançon
- Town hall
- Prefecture
- Departmental Council of Doubs
- Saint-Jacques Hospital
- Presidency of the University of Franche-Comté
- Regional Council of Bourgogne-Franche-Comté
- Center régional de documentation pédagogique
- Rectorat d'Académie

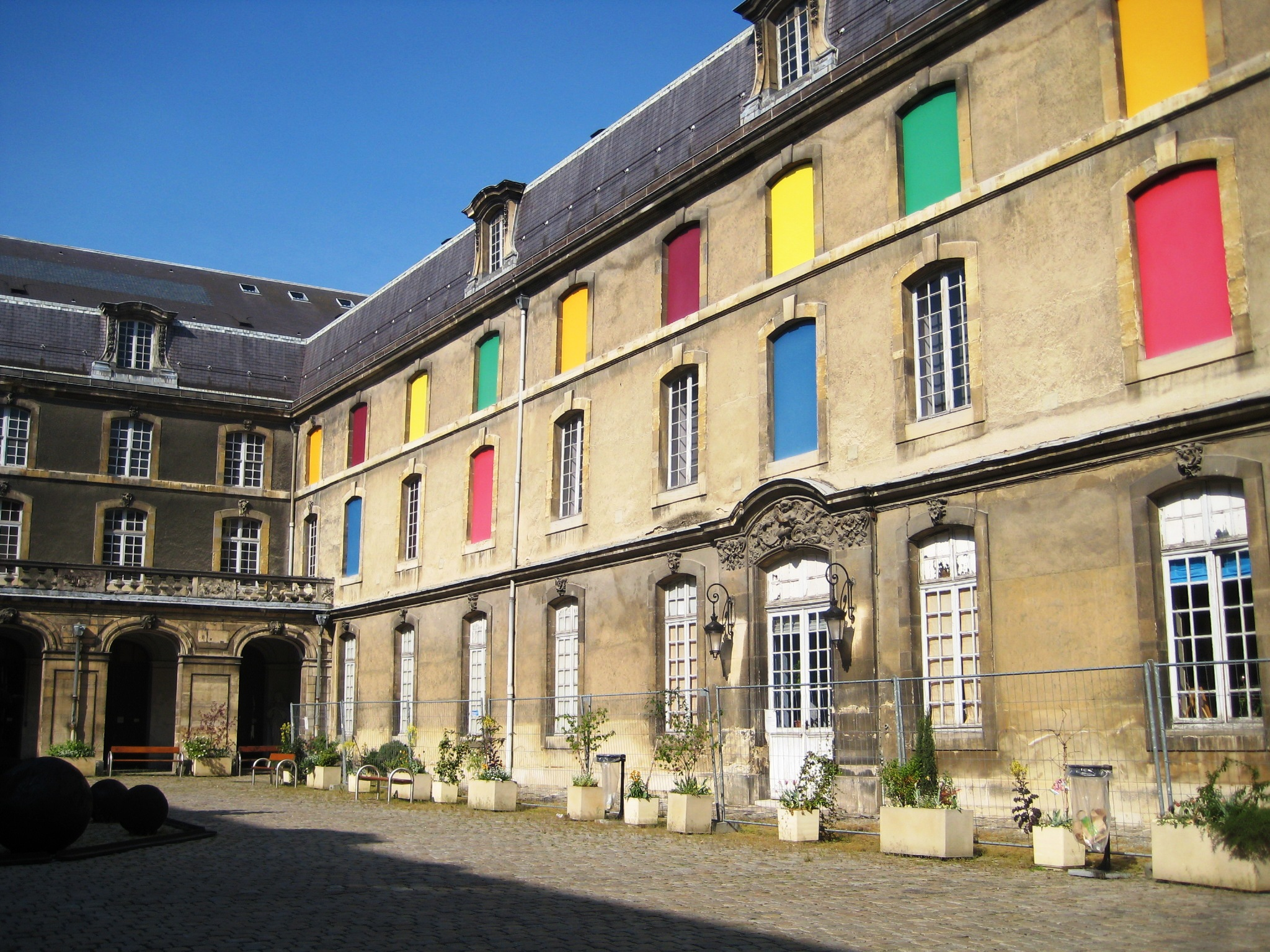
Musée des Beaux-Arts et d'Archéologie de Besançon

=== Cultural facilities ===
- Musée des Beaux-Arts et d'Archéologie de Besançon
- Cité des Arts
- Théâtre Baccus
- Ledoux Theater
- Cinéma Mégarama Beaux-Arts
- Bibliothèque municipale
- Pierre-Bayle media library
- Information and guidance center (CIO)

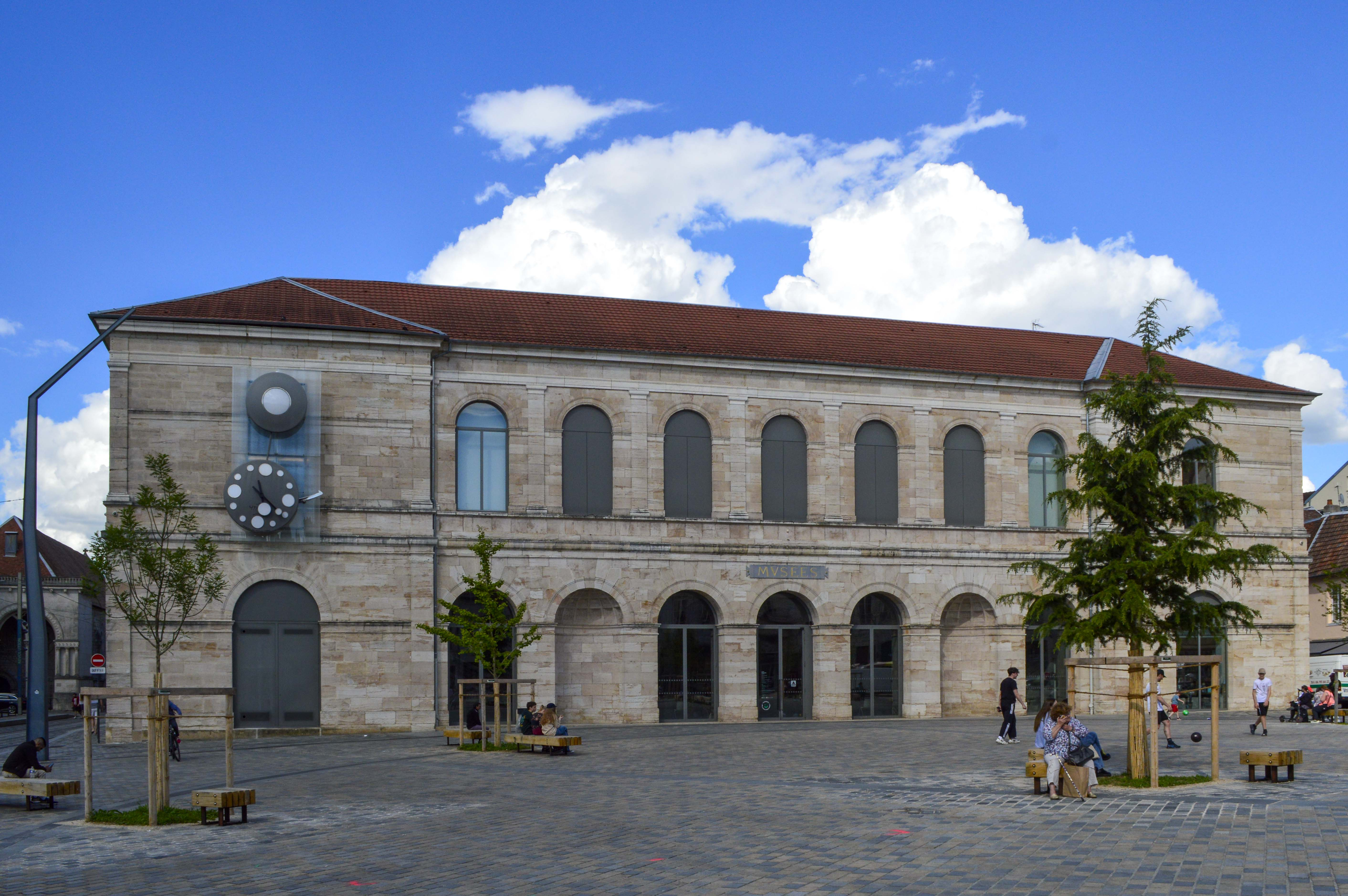
Cité des Arts

=== Teaching facilities ===
Primary education

- Ronchaux Public Nursery School
- Bersot public nursery school
- Granvelle public nursery school
- École maternelle privée Saint-Joseph-Sainte-Ursule
- Granvelle Public Primary School
- Saint-Joseph-Sainte-Ursule private elementary school
- Rivotte Public Primary School

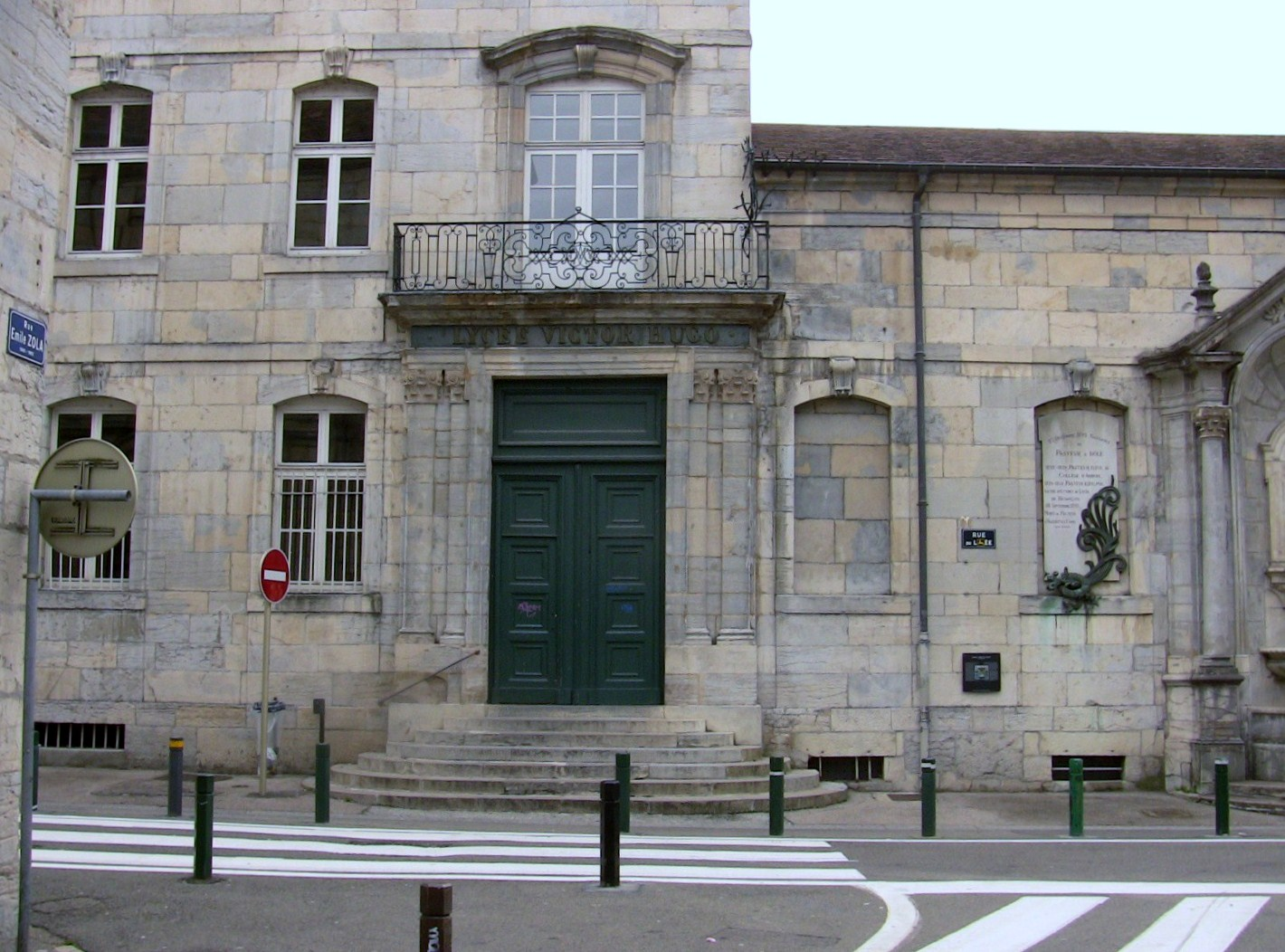
College Victor Hugo

Secondary education

- Collège Louis-et-Auguste-Lumière
- Collège Victor-Hugo
- Collège privé Sainte-Ursule
- Lycée Louis-Pasteur
- Lycée professionnel Cours hôtelier de Besançon
- Lycée professionnel École de coiffure Cordier

Higher education

- UFR Sciences of Language, Man and Society (SLHS)

== Life downtown ==
=== Events ===
The vast majority of festive and cultural events take place in the Boucle district, including the Livres dans la Boucle, Jazz et musique improvisée en Franche-Comté, Lumières d'Afrique and traditional Christmas market festivals.

=== Sports practice ===
The district has no sports facilities, apart from the Chamars skatepark.

=== Media ===
- BVV, Besançon Votre Ville
- L'Est Républicain
- France Bleu Besançon
- France 3 Franche-Comté

== Environment ==
Numerous parks and promenades make up the district's natural urban environment. Among the best-known are the Promenade Chamars, Parc Micaud, Square Saint-Amour and Parc Granvelle. The area also boasts century-old plane trees in Chamars, forming a veritable "petit bois", home to numerous species of birds, including crows, pigeons and sparrows. In addition to the natural spaces, the town also makes a point of creating "shrub-sculptures" to embellish the town center.

== Local personalities ==
The majority of famous Bisontins were born in this district:

=== Writers and philosophers ===
Victor Hugo, Pierre-Joseph Proudhon, Tristan Bernard, Charles Fourier, Charles Nodier

=== Inventors and scientists ===
Auguste and Louis Lumière, Eugène Péclet, Hilaire de Chardonnet

=== Military and political figures ===
Jean-Marie Brulard, Claude Jacques Lecourbe, Yves Jégo, Viviane Wade, Charles-Étienne-François Ruty

=== Others ===
Claude-Adrien Nonnotte, Jean Josselin, Jean de Gribaldy

== Bibliography ==
- Antony, Daniel; Paygnard, Marc (2001). Besançon, l'esprit du temps (in French). Sekoya Eds Du. ISBN 284751001X.
- Bonnet, Dominique; Maraux, Denis (2002). Découvrir Besançon. La Taillanderie. ISBN 2876292572.
- Laurent, Pierre; Chaillet, Catherine (2007). Besançon : un temps d'avance. Autrement. ISBN 978-2746709478.
- Courtier, Jean. Besançon en cartes postales anciennes. Bibliothèque Européenne.
- De Vesontio à Besançon. Chaman. 2006. ISBN 297004353X.
- Besançon. Déclics. 2006. ISBN 2847681043.
- Dutriez, Robert (1981). Besançon, ville fortifiée : De Vauban à Séré de Rivières. Besançon: Cêtre. ISBN 2901040209.
- Fohlen, Claude (1994). Histoire de Besançon. Cêtre. ISBN 2901040217.
- Fohlen, Claude (1994). Histoire de Besançon. Vol. 2. Cêtre. ISBN 2901040276.
- Maraux, Denis; Gasc, Émilie (2003). Besançon. Déclics. ISBN 2847680322.
- Maraux, Denis; Gasc, Émilie (2006). Besançon. Déclics. ISBN 2847681043.
- Toillon, Eveline (2005). Besançon insolite et secret. Alan Sutton. ISBN 2842539141.
- Walter, Hélène; Barçon, Jean-Claude (2004). Vesontio Besançon. Lyon: PUL. ISBN 2729707395.

== See also ==
- Canton of Besançon-5
- Besançon
- Bourgogne-Franche-Comté
- Immigration to Besançon
