= Porte Noire =

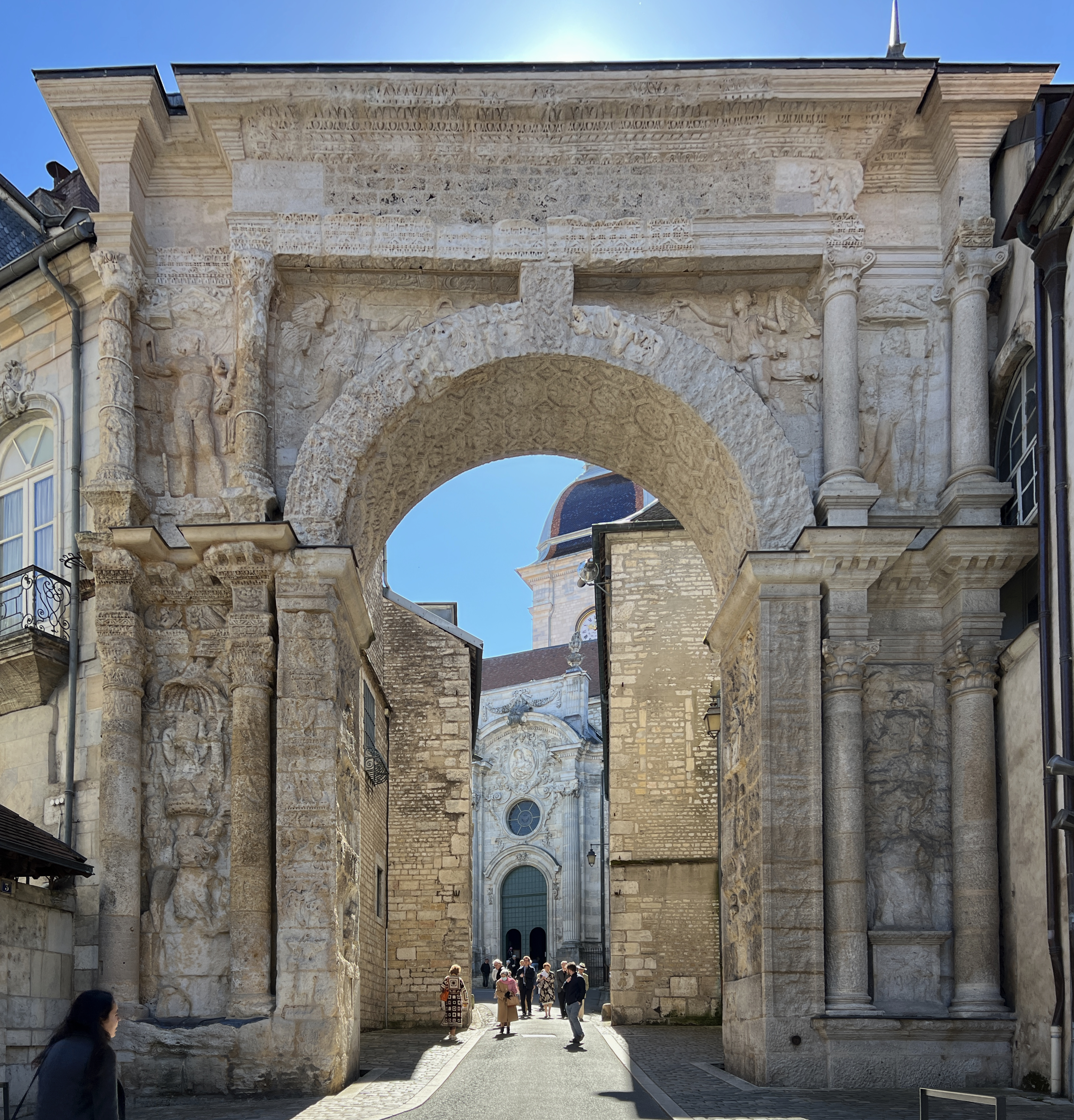
Porte Noire

The Porte Noire (literally, "Black Gate") is a Roman triumphal arch in Besançon, France.

The limestone arch was located at the southern end of the cardo, the main north-to-south route of a Roman city. It measured 5.6 metres in width and 11.2 metres in height, and its two facades were identical, of which the northern one is the better preserved.

== History ==
The arch lacks a dedication, but research has dated it to the second half of the second century AD, and the reign of the emperor Marcus Aurelius. It is believed that depictions of war show the victories of his adoptive brother and co-emperor Lucius Verus in the Roman–Parthian War of 161–166. Disturbances by the local Sequani Gallic tribe around 175 AD may have been the trigger event for erecting the arch, as a tribute to Marcus Aurelius restoring peace. A differing hypothesis is that the arch commemorates the same emperor's victory over Germanic peoples in 176 AD, and that this would be more likely than an arch remembering internal turmoil in the empire.

Under the Merovingian dynasty, the arch was used as fortifications. Originally brightly coloured, the arch was blackened by centuries of fire and has been known by its current name since the 11th century. The upper part of the arch and the statue of the emperor atop it are lost, as are the sides, now part of the rectory and archdiocesan buildings; its feet are submerged one metre below road level.

The arch has been classed as a monument historique since 1840, the first year of such listings. In 2007, a restoration project was initiated, to restore the gate to its previous colour, with the work taking place from 2009 to 2011. The restoration bill totaled €1,279,720 and was funded by the city, the department of Doubs, the region of Franche-Comté and the French state.

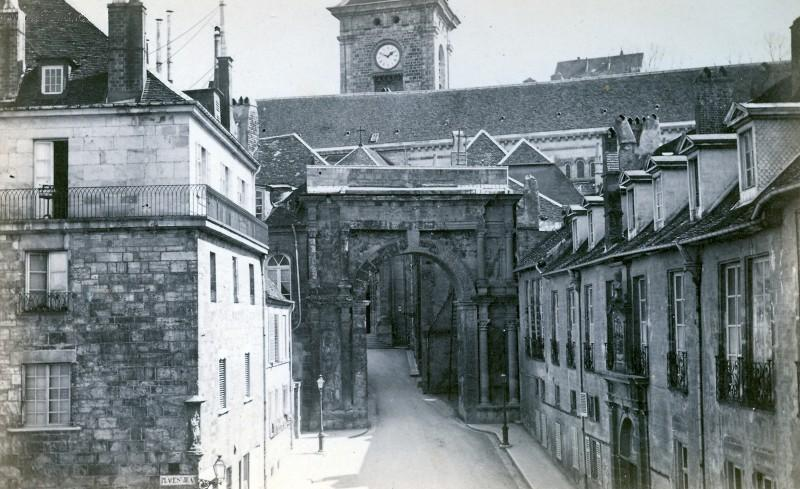
The gate in the early 20th century. Note its acquired black colouring

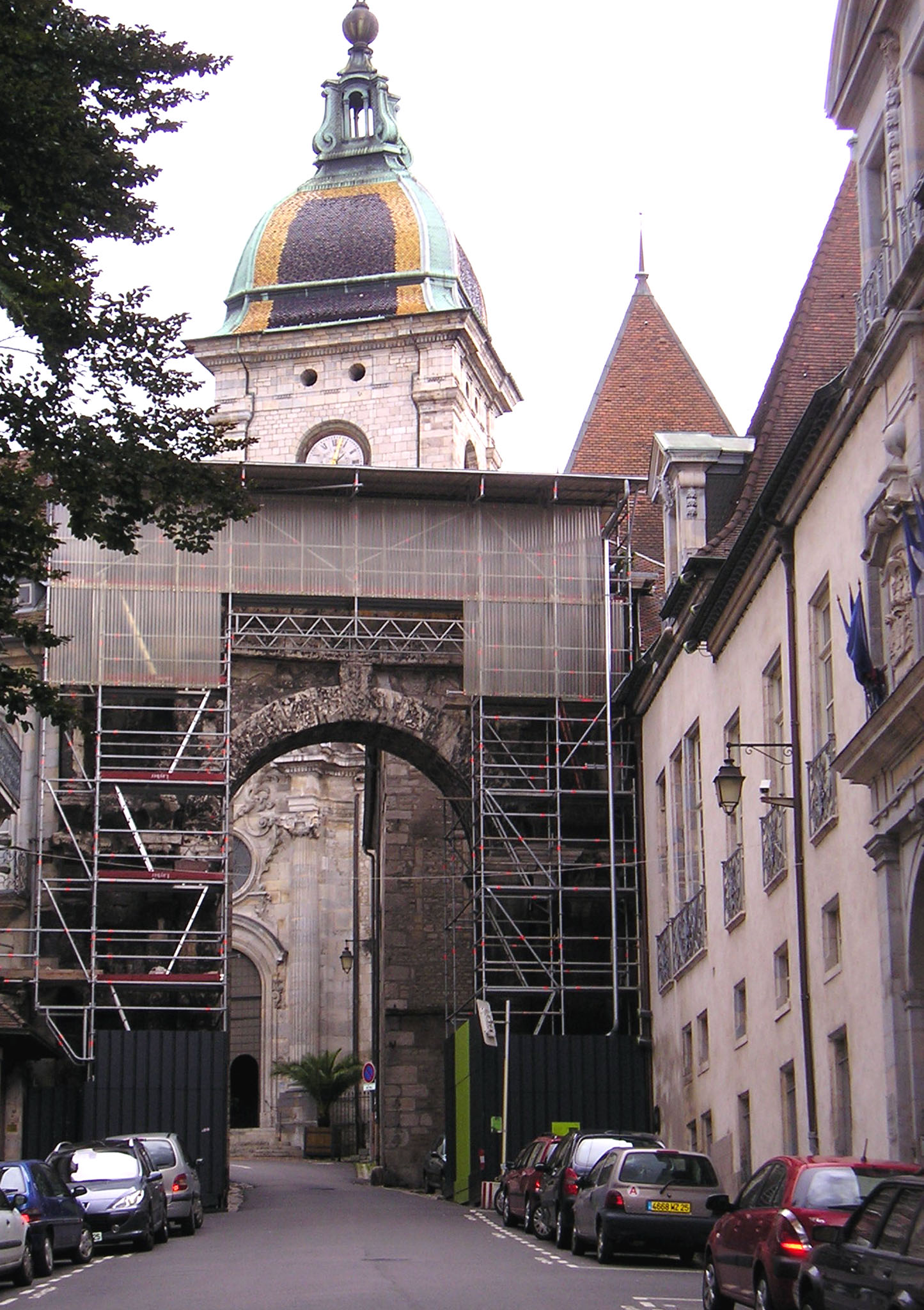
Early stages of restoration in 2007

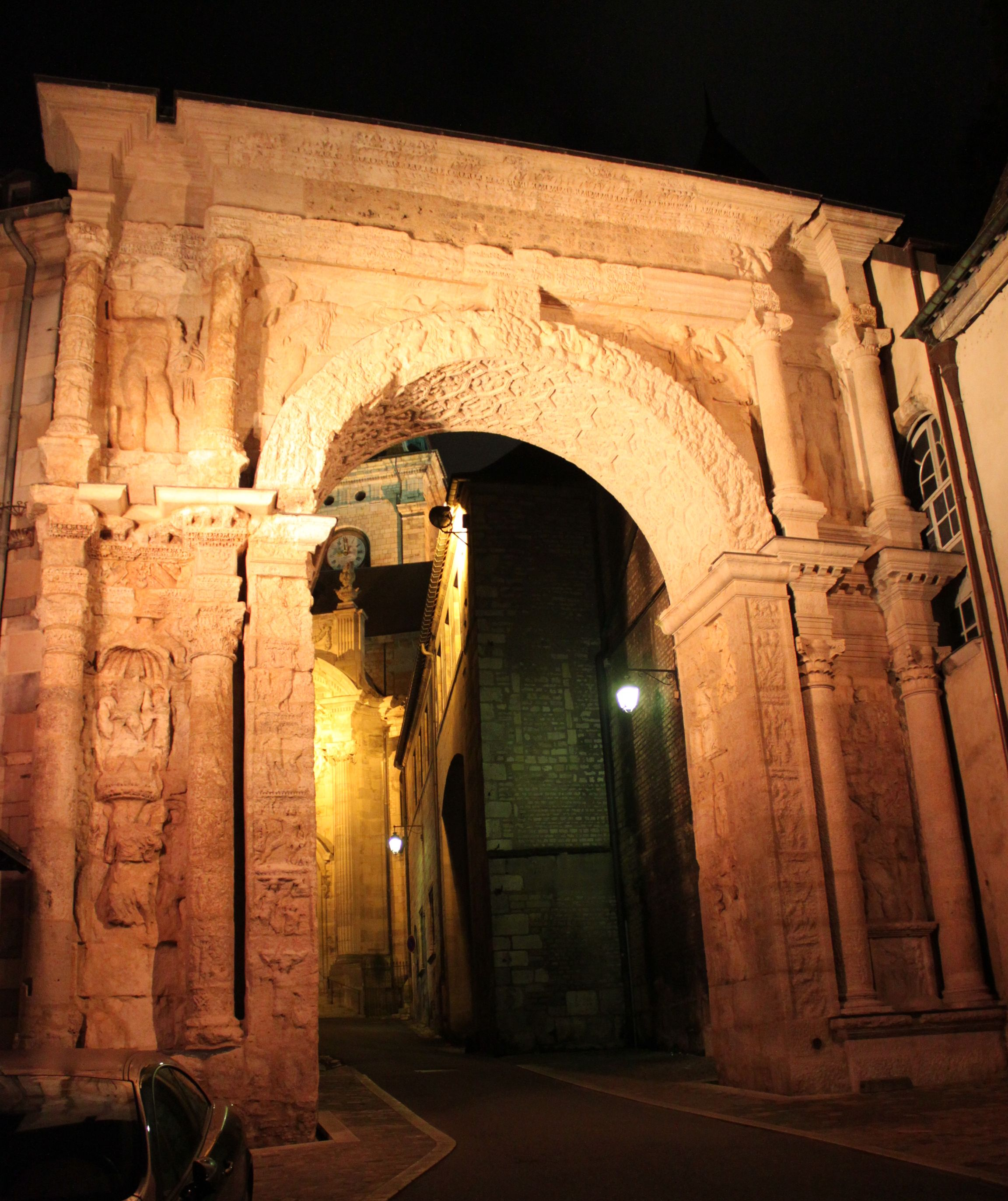
Gate illuminated at night
