= Morre =

- Commune
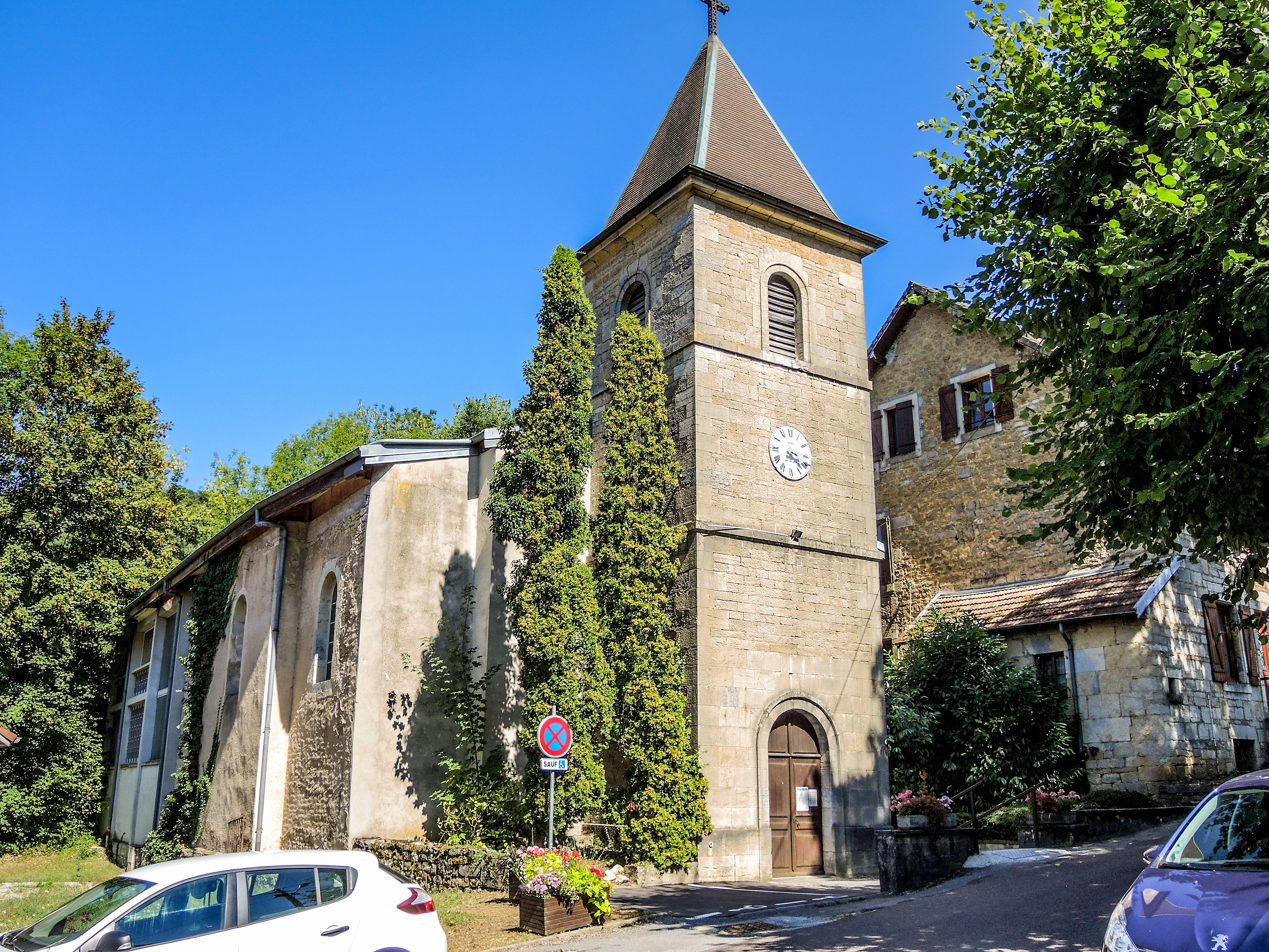
- The church in Morre
- Location of Morre
- Location within France Location within Bourgogne-Franche-Comté
- Coordinates: 47°13′35″N 6°03′58″E
- Country: France
- Region: Bourgogne-Franche-Comté
- Department: Doubs
- Arrondissement: Besançon
- Canton: Besançon-5
- Intercommunality: Grand Besançon Métropole

Government
  - Mayor (2020–2026): Jean-Michel Cayuela
- Area^{1}: 5.27 km^{2} (2.03 sq mi)
- Highest elevation: 490 m (1,610 ft)
- Lowest elevation: 245 m (804 ft)
- Population (2023): 1,303
  - Density: 247/km^{2} (640/sq mi)
- Time zone: UTC+01:00 (CET)
  - Summer (DST): UTC+02:00 (CEST)
- INSEE/Postal code: 25410 /25660
- ^{1} French Land Register data, which excludes lakes, ponds, glaciers > 1 km^{2} (0.386 sq mi or 247 acres) and river estuaries.

Morre (French pronunciation: [mɔʁ]) is a commune in the Doubs department in the Bourgogne-Franche-Comté region in eastern France.

== Geography ==
Morre lies 4 km (2.5 mi) east of Besançon on the road to Pontarlier and Switzerland.

== Population ==
Historical population
Year	Pop.	±% p.a.
1968	667	—
1975	1,176	+8.44%
1982	1,009	−2.16%
1990	998	−0.14%
1999	1,154	+1.63%
2007	1,245	+0.95%
2012	1,337	+1.44%
2017	1,361	+0.36%
2023	1,303	−0.72%
Source: INSEE

== See also ==
- Communes of the Doubs department
