= Porte taillée =

Coordinates: 47.228566°N 6.038392°E

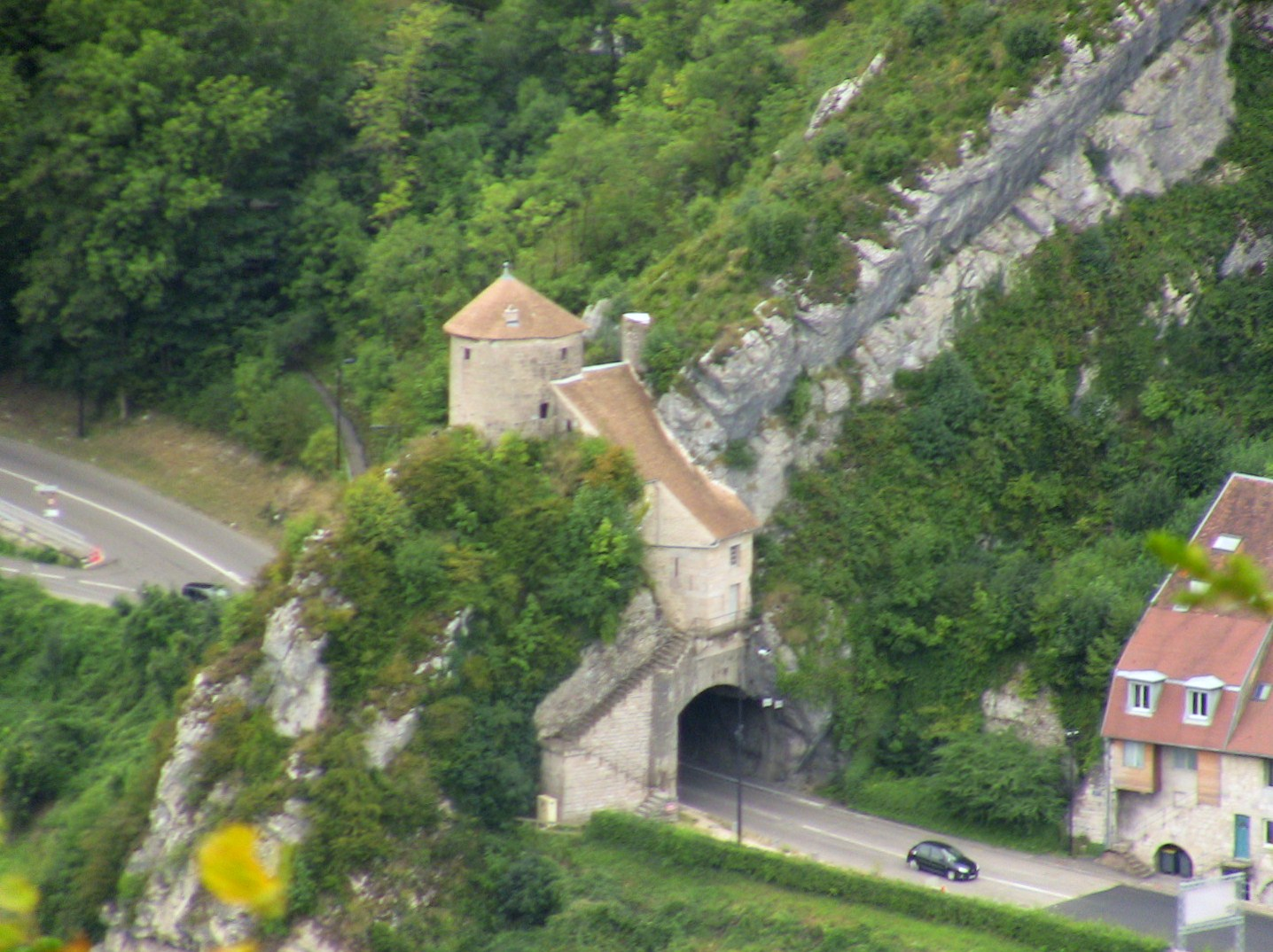
- General view of the building, from Fort of Bregille (2009).
- Interactive map of the Porte taillée area

General information
- Architectural style: City gate
- Location: Besançon, France
- Construction started: Ancient Rome to 1546.
- Owner: City of Besançon

Design and construction
- Architects: Romans, Vauban

The Porte taillée (French for carved gate) is a city gate located in Besançon (France). It was drilled in the rock of Saint-Étienne hill by the Romans under Vespasian or Marcus Aurelius, for the aqueduc of Besançon between Vaire-Arcier and square Castan. The passage is redeveloping during the Middle Ages in real city gate, and fortified in 1546 by Vauban under Charles Quint. The Porte taillée is classified Monument historique since 1944.

== Gallery ==
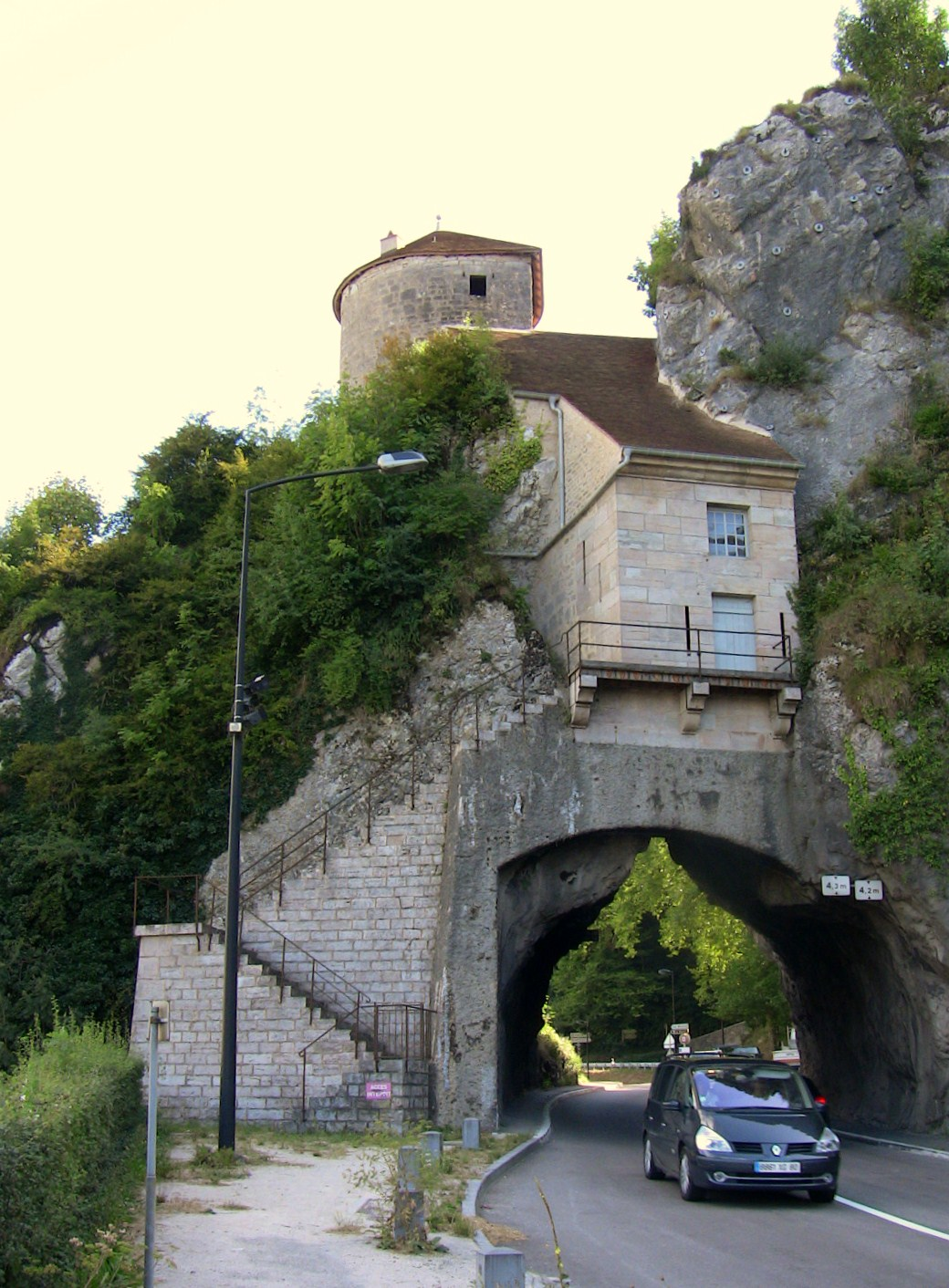

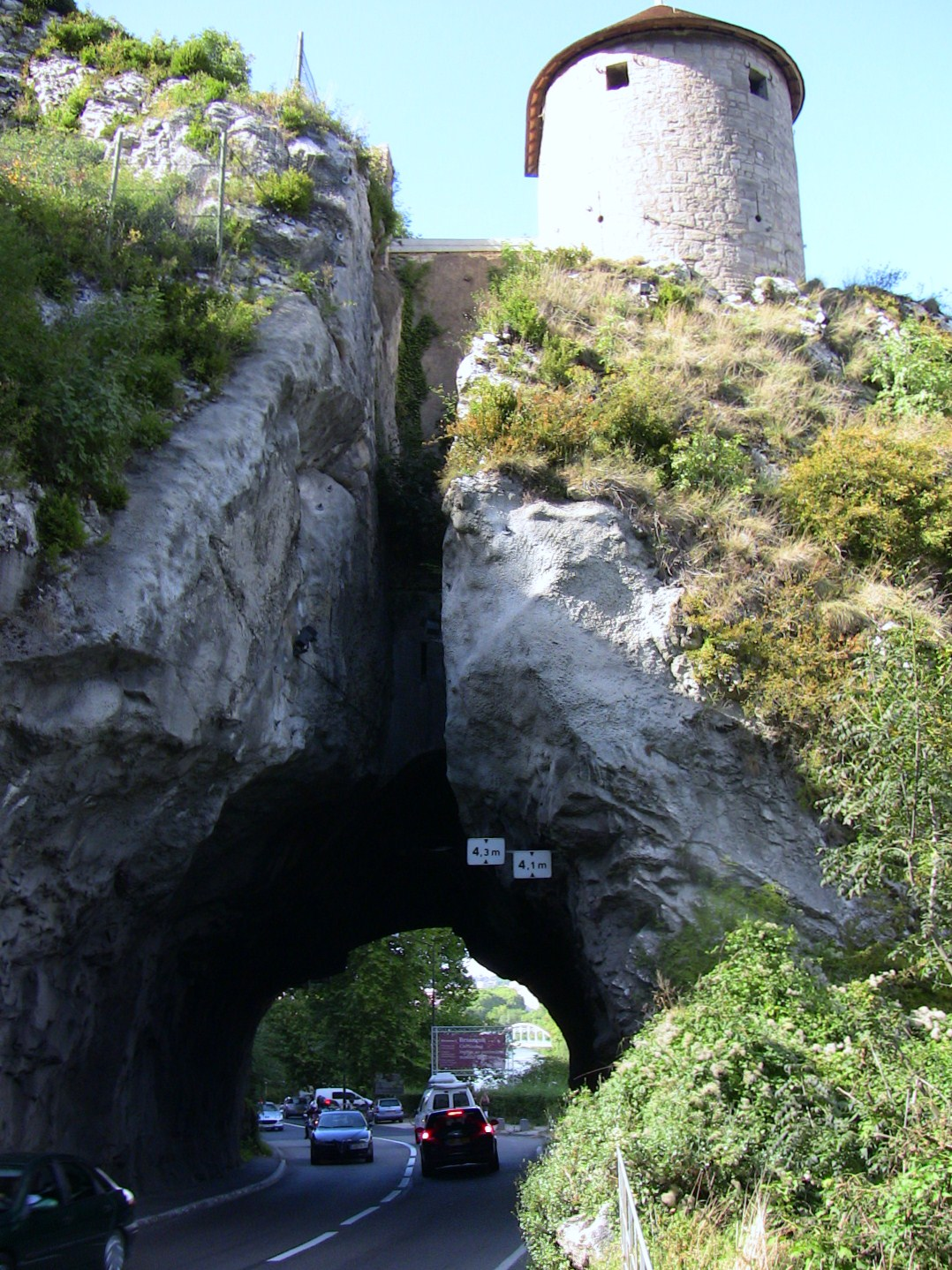

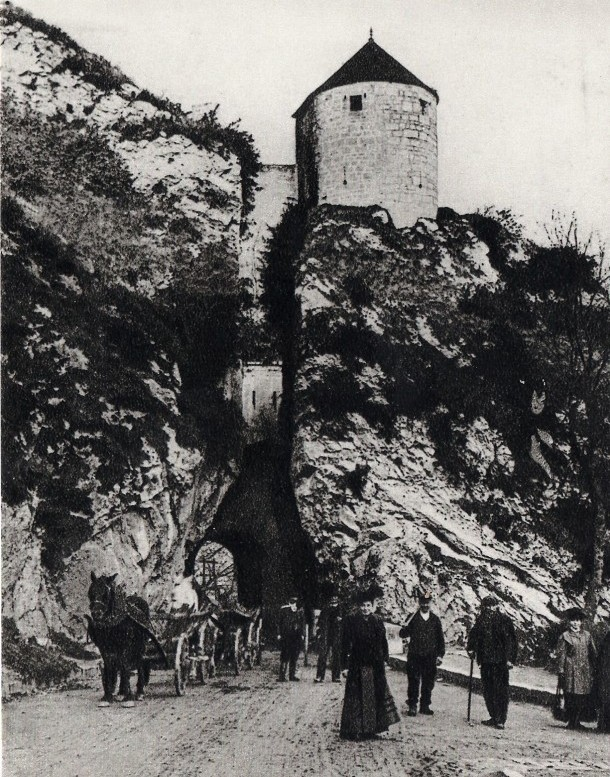
