= Velotte (Besançon) =

Quarter of Besançon, France

Coordinates: 47.2188°N 6.01774°E

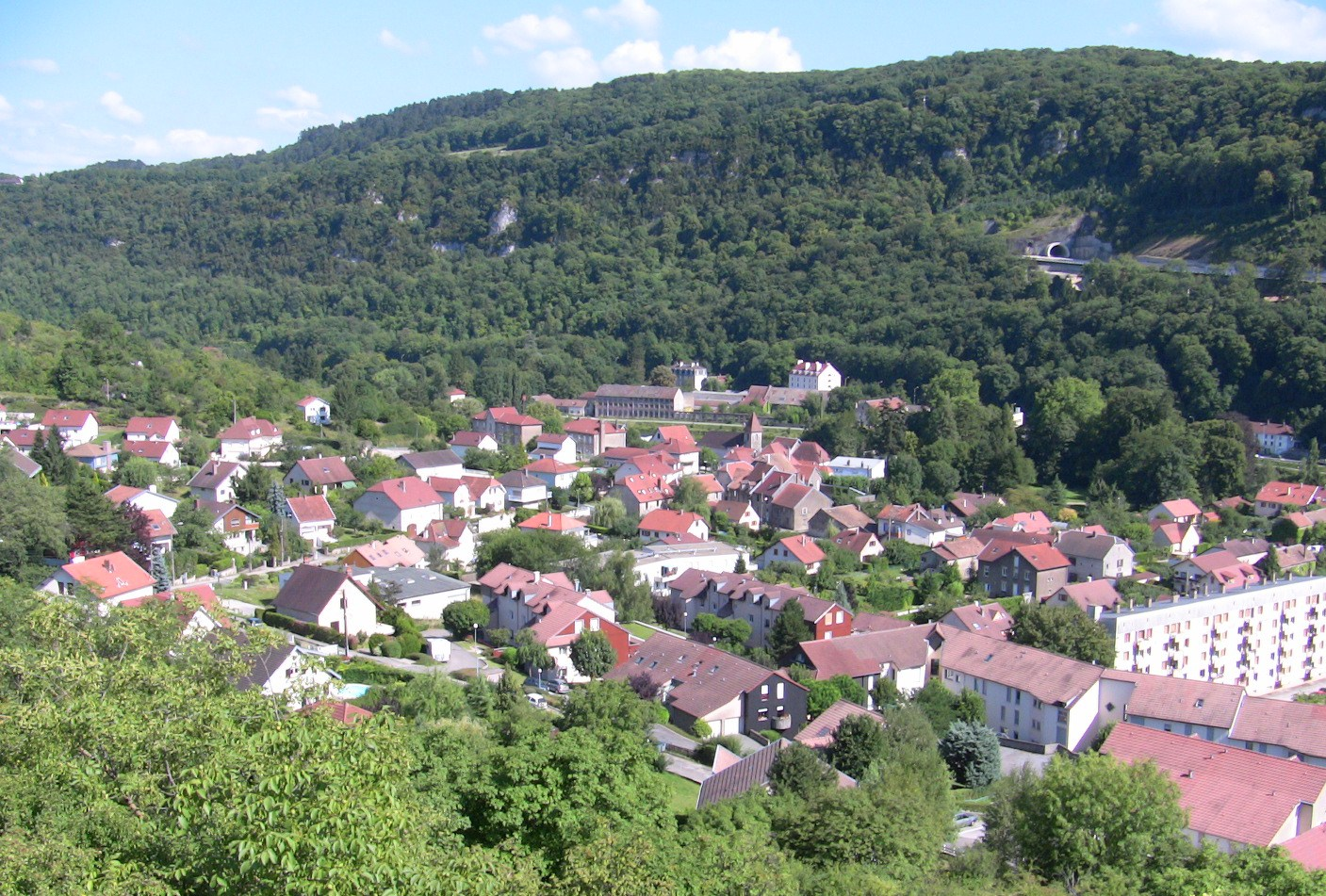
View of Velotte

Velotte is a little area of Besançon, with 2,000 inhabitants.

== History ==
Velotte was a little village before being attached to Besançon.

== Monuments ==
- Church
- Fountain

== Administrative buildings ==
- Stadium

== Transports ==
- Bus, number 24
