= Bregille Funicular =

French railway

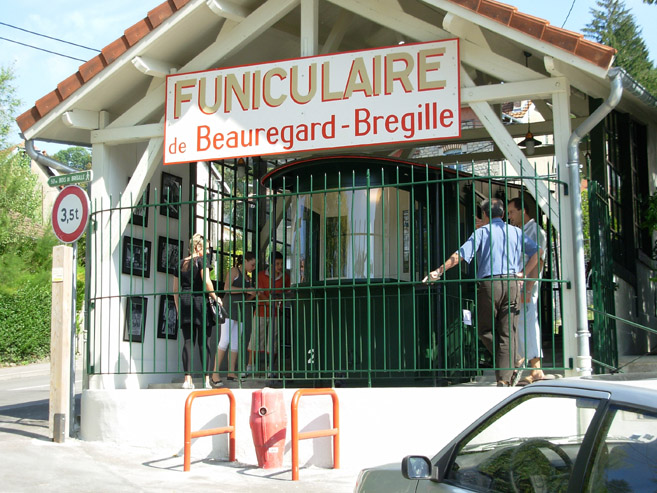
- The lower station in 2007

Overview
- Owner: City of Besançon
- Locale: Besançon; France
- Coordinates: 47°14′30″N 6°02′05″E

History
- Opened: 1912
- Closed: 1987

Technical
- Line length: 0.423 km (0.263 mi)
- Number of tracks: Single track
- Track gauge: Narrow-gauge railway (1,050 mm)
- Electrification: 1912
- Operating speed: 8 km/h (5.0 mph)

The Beauregard-Bregille Funicular, also known as the Bregille Funicular, is a funicular railway and former tramway line located in Besançon, in the Doubs department of France. Initially proposed in 1899 by Émile Picard, the line was designed to connect the lower and upper sections of Bregille Hill, facilitating access to nearby woodlands and green spaces. It was inaugurated in 1912, after the decline of thermal spa tourism. Despite recurring financial challenges, the line remained in operation until 1987, when a technical failure led to its closure. Listed in the Inventory of Historic Monuments since January 27, 2011, the funicular is currently the subject of a rehabilitation project supported by a local association and the City of Besançon.

== History ==
The concept for a funicular linking Bregille to Besançon's thermal facilities was proposed by Émile Picard in 1899 to facilitate tourist access to spa treatments and outdoor areas. In the early 20th century, Picard established the Electric Tramway Company of the Beauregard Plateau, and the funicular entered public service in 1912. Following initial success, ridership became inconsistent, and the company faced increasing debt, particularly after Picard died in 1931 and by the late 1930s. The municipality acquired the line and created the Funicular Authority, which recorded peak passenger numbers before experiencing a steady decline, from 222,000 passengers in 1945 to 38,000 in 1979. The decline continued into the 1980s, ultimately leading to the funicular's closure.

In 1987, the Bregille Funicular ceased operations due to technical issues. Although the closure was initially intended to be temporary, high repair costs prevented its reopening, and the site remained inactive. In 2005, the association Friends of the Besançon Funicular was established to promote the preservation and restoration of the infrastructure, including the stations, tracks, and cars. The line was added to the Inventory of Historic Monuments by a decree dated January 27, 2011. In 2022, with support from the City of Besançon and the Regional Council, the association commissioned a technical assessment by a company specializing in cable transport to evaluate the feasibility and cost of rehabilitation. A complete restoration and reopening of the funicular remains the association's long-term objective.

== Characteristics ==
=== General and technical characteristics ===
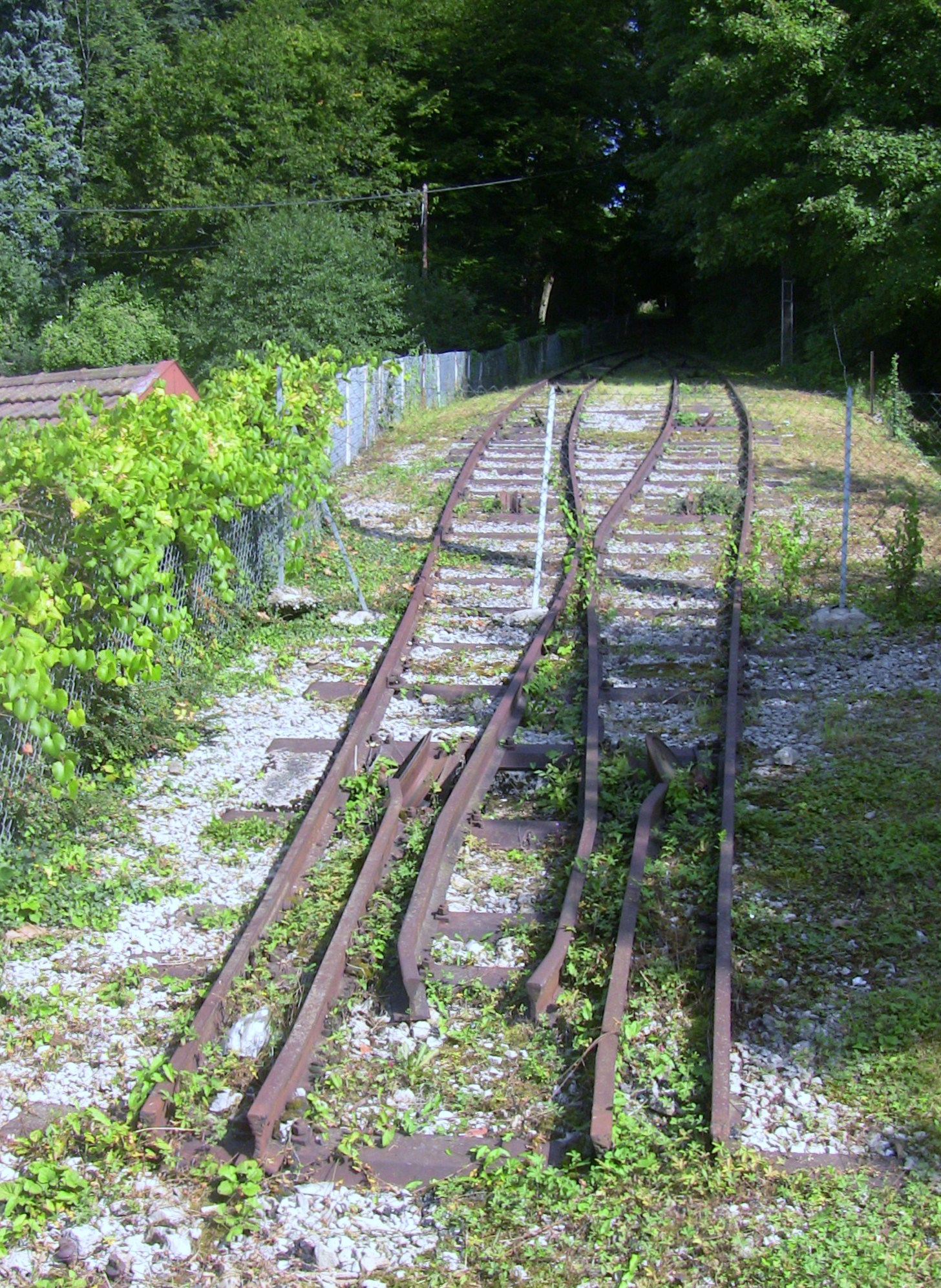
The Abt avoidance system for funicular railways.

Before its closure, the Bregille Funicular operated daily with varying hours and transported an average of 239 passengers per day, totaling approximately 87,249 annually. Initially, from its opening until the 1930s, its primary users were spa visitors and Bregille residents. In later decades, the service was mainly used by local residents and visitors seeking access to nearby green spaces.

The funicular covered a 73-meter elevation difference over a 423-meter track at a speed of 8 km/h. It featured an Abt passing loop and operated on a single narrow-gauge track measuring 1.05 meters. The line had a maximum gradient of 22% and used Vignole rails with railhead sides shaped in a "V" to prevent the brake jaws from lifting the car during emergency braking.

The Beauregard-Bregille Funicular's motor, manufactured by Alsthom in 1938, was paired with machinery built by the Swiss company Louis de Roll in Bern. Initially equipped with a 28-horsepower motor, it was later upgraded to a 32-horsepower motor located at the upper station, powered by a trackside line that was dismantled upon closure. Communication between the cars and machinery relied on a bell system to signal departures from the stations and engine room.

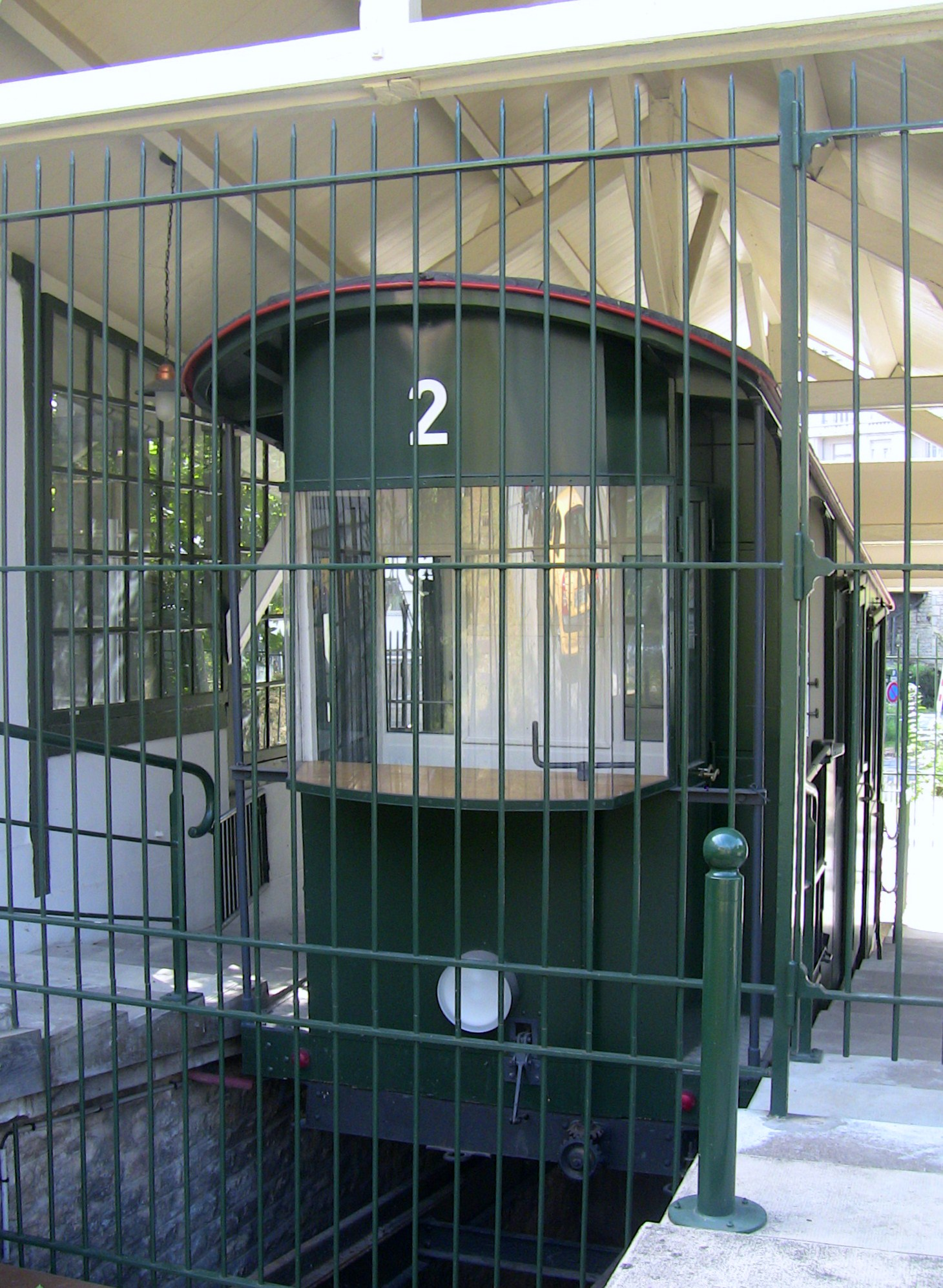
A funicular car.

Since 1981, the Beauregard-Bregille Funicular cars have maintained their current design, with wooden bodies rebuilt on the original chassis, featuring curved Plexiglas windows in the drivers' cabins instead of flat ones. The car roofs, covered with copper-green sheeting over plywood, ensure watertightness. Each car, measuring 8.50 meters and weighing 6.20 tons, has two passenger compartments with sixteen seats, a baggage compartment for eight to ten people, and two driver platforms, with the floor arranged on four levels. The operator monitored movement using a cursor on a ruler, with the cable pulling the cars at 8 km/h. The funicular's operation required four staff members.

The Beauregard-Bregille Funicular included an ungated level crossing before the Abt passing loop, located midway along the line, a rare feature for funiculars in France. The crossing intersected a dead-end road serving a few residences, which has been barricaded and paved over since the funicular's closure. Flashing signals, activated by the passing cars, protected the road.

=== Geographical location ===
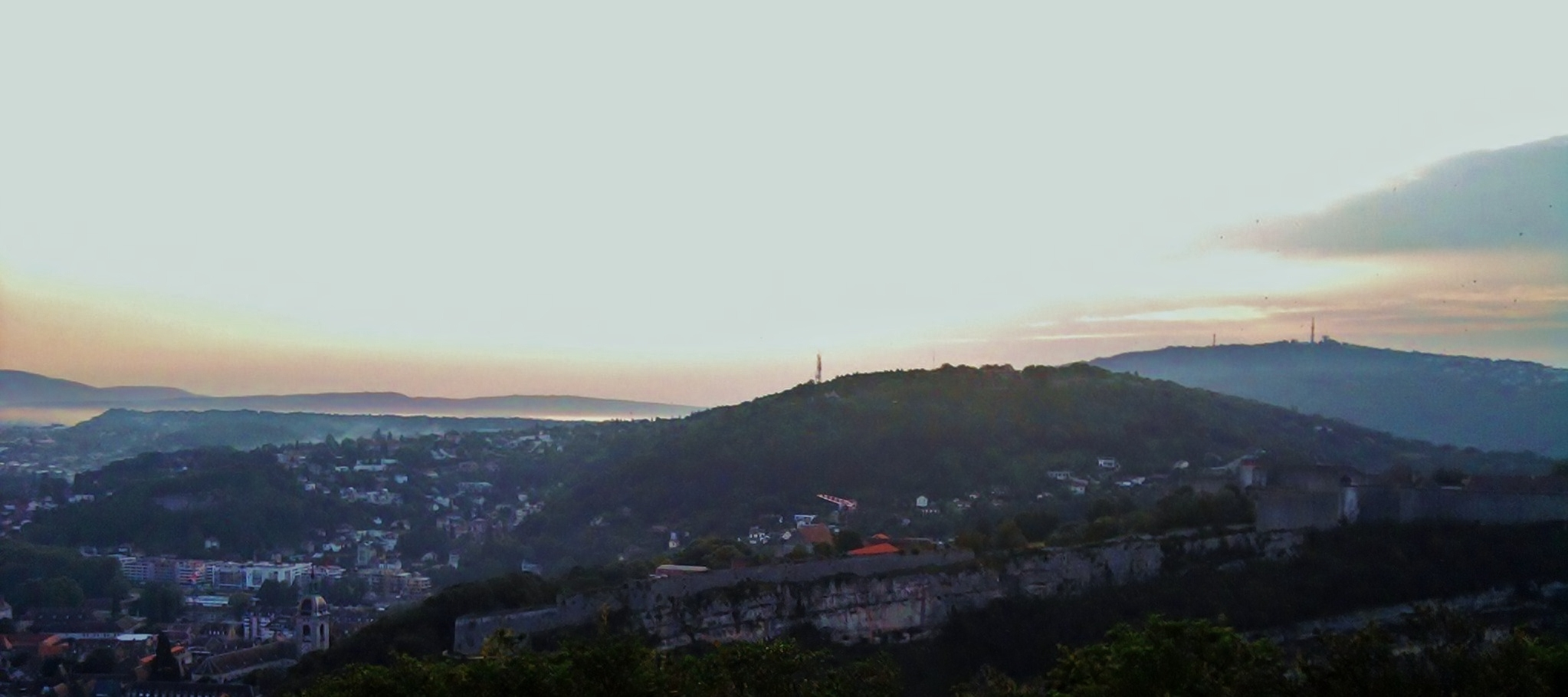
Bregille Hill at dawn.

The Beauregard-Bregille Funicular connects the Mouillère district, near Besançon's city center, with the Beauregard-Bregille plateau, a residential area with views of the old town and its fortifications. It is located near the municipal casino, Besançon-les-Bains thermal center, Micaud Park, and Fort Beauregard.

The funicular's lower station is at the intersection of Rue du Funiculaire and Rue des Fontenottes, following the Aiguille Path to the upper station at Chemin des Monts-de-Bregille. It is accessible via Ginko bus lines 24, 27, and C (Funiculaire stop) and the Besançon-la Mouillère train station on the TER line Besançon–Le Locle–La Chaux-de-Fonds.

== Historical context of the creation ==
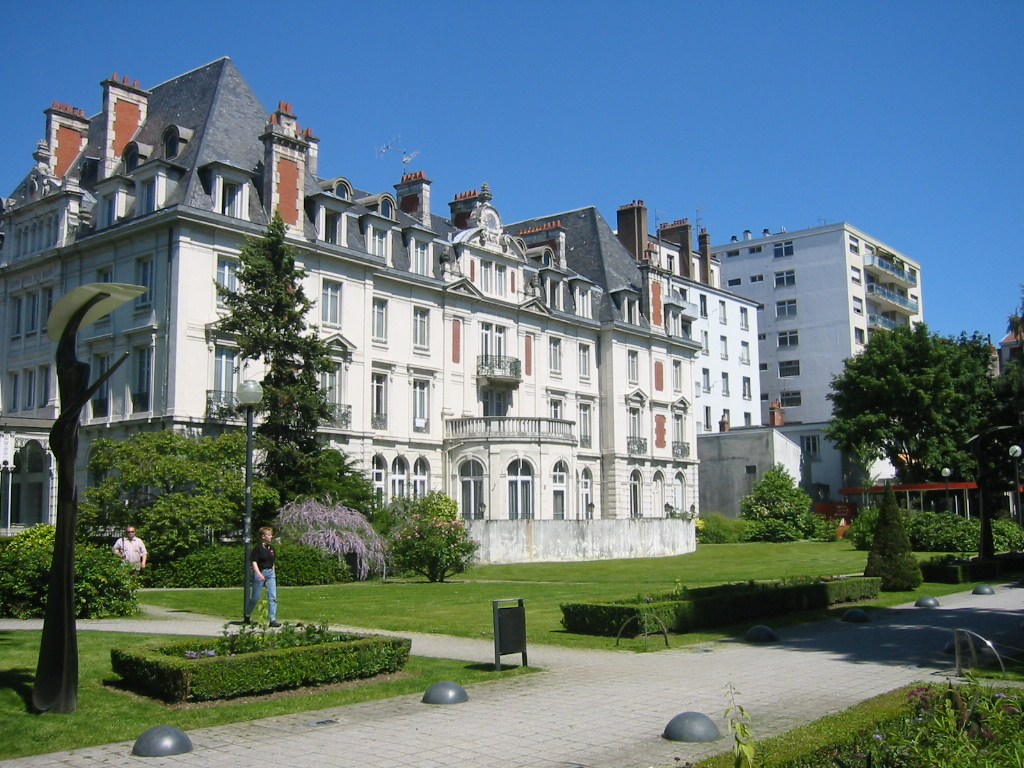
Besançon les Bains Hotel.

At the end of the 19th century, the Mouillère district of Besançon and the Bregille plateau, then a small village with approximately 300 inhabitants, underwent significant changes following the construction of the Mouillère train station in 1884 and the thermal complex of the Bains salins de La Mouillère in 1892–1893. The growth of thermal spa activity prompted local authorities to consider developing the surrounding area, particularly the Bregille plateau, to provide complementary facilities such as hotels, air-cure resorts, villas, and apartments. Private initiative was strongly encouraged. During its session of May 20, 1898, the Société de médecine de Besançon expressed the following wish: "To see an agreement established between the public authorities, local interest groups, and the board of directors of the baths, to awaken, advise, and encourage with all their strength private initiative, and to bring about the creation, in the immediate vicinity of the baths, and more specifically on the Bregille plateau, of holiday centers equipped with sufficient and practical means of communication with La Mouillère and the city, thereby allowing spa visitors to combine the benefits of the saline cure with those of a true air cure and a mid-altitude cure." The stated objective was to develop the Bregille area and establish effective transportation. On February 5, 1899, Émile Picard, a landowner in Bregille and a watchmaking industrialist, sent a letter to the city's mayor proposing such a project:

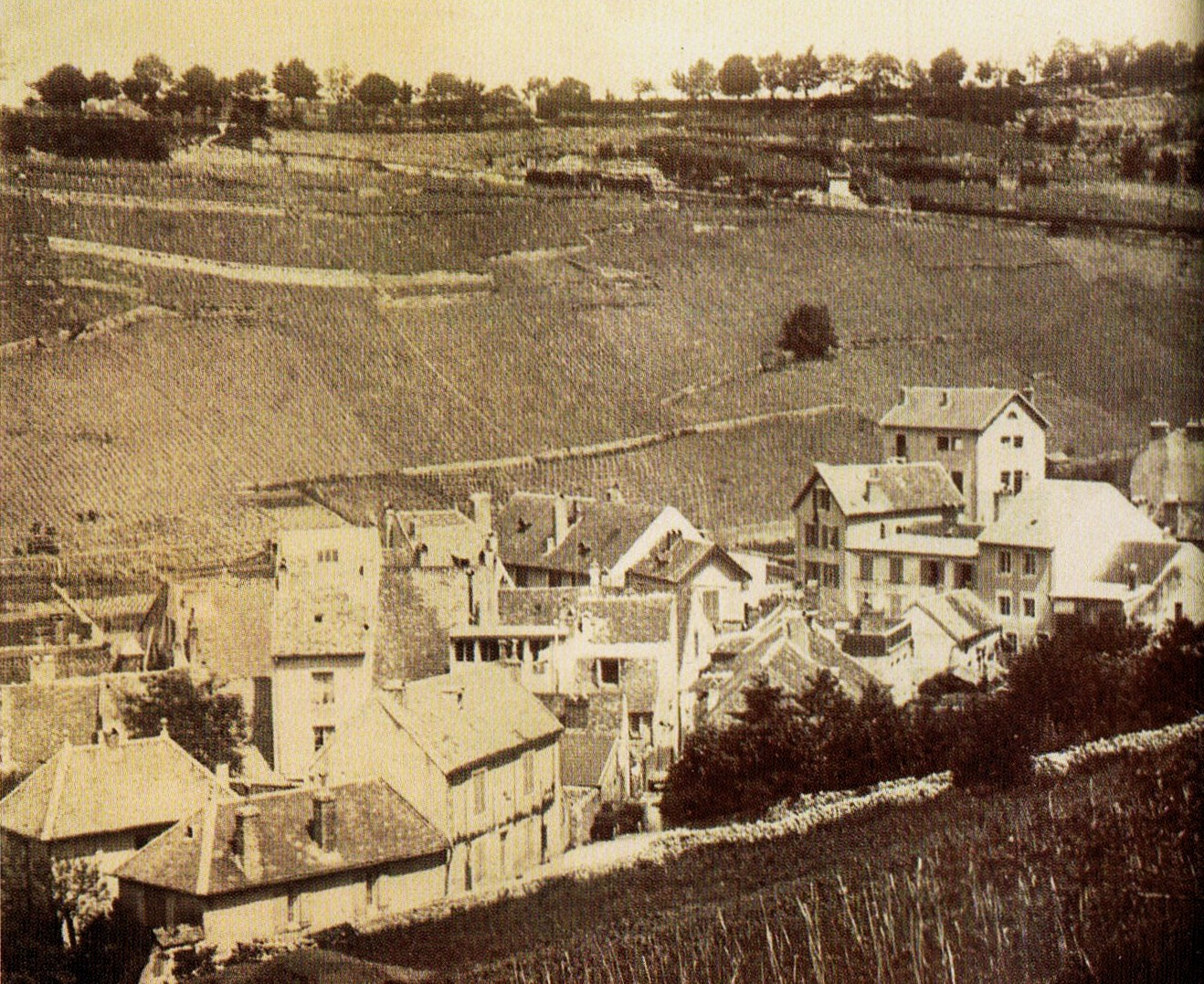
Bregille village, circa 1900.

Besançon, February 5, 1899
The undersigned have the honor to request the goodwill of the Municipality in agreeing to the following request. It is a matter of improving access to part of the Beauregard hillside, which is of public interest, since each season, property owners offer spa visitors villas and furnished apartments that cannot be rented due to the poor condition of the Beauregard road. Based on unofficial information, the municipality appears willing to accept a road project and layout plan, at the expense of adjacent landowners, all of whom are willing to donate their land free of charge. While awaiting the realization of the aforementioned project, and to alleviate the accessibility problems of the Beauregard road, these various property owners have already begun to pave and repair it. They request and implore the Municipality to assist in completing this work by granting a few carts of gravel and a few workdays from city road workers familiar with such tasks, so that the road may be accessible during the good season to the many visitors who come to see us. Hoping that our request will receive the support of all our council members, we have the honor to express, along with our greetings, our deepest thanks.

— Émile Picard [+35 signatures]

== Projects ==
=== First project ===
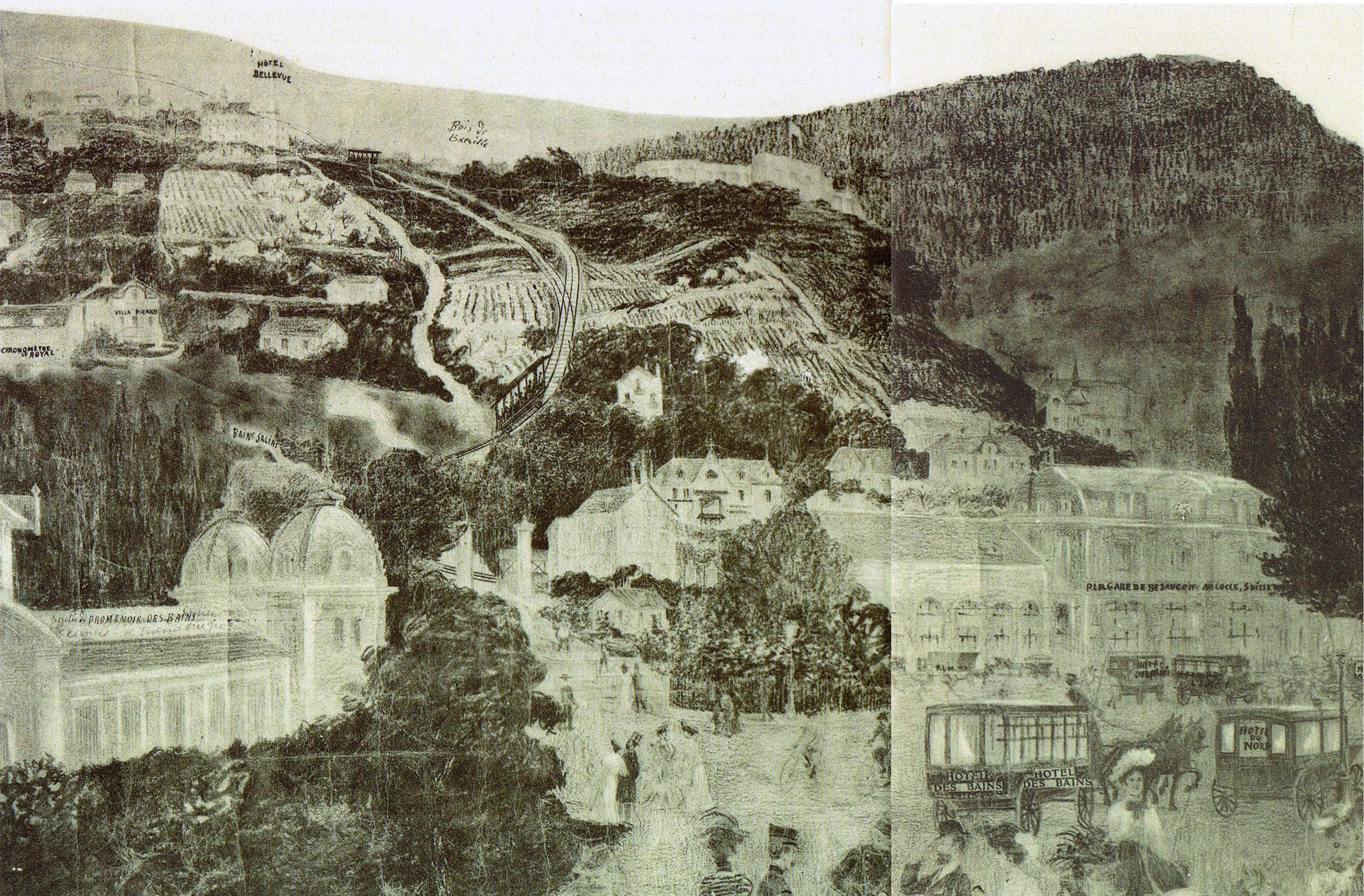
Advertisement on the Mouillère-Besançon electric railway to the Bregille plateau, dating from 1902.

On May 26, 1899, Émile Picard wrote to the mayor of Besançon, requesting a concession to establish a funicular along the sentier de l'Aiguille. His proposal, supported by numerous signatures from Bregille property owners, gained significant credibility. A subsequent letter on June 27, 1899, confirmed the funicular project initially proposed on May 26:

Besançon, June 27, 1899 — To the Mayor of Besançon, I have the honor of confirming my letter of May 26, in which I requested the concession for establishing a funicular. I again request the Municipality's approval of this same proposal. Enclosed, you will find a basic map indicating the departure and arrival points. My project consists of departing from the bottom of the chemin de l'aiguille to reach the summit. I need not emphasize the advantages of this funicular, which will be built with the most advanced improvements. Regarding the procedures within your competence to obtain approval from the Department and the State, I believe that, given the location of this line, which will only cross private lands within Besançon, the Municipality alone has the authority to grant this concession. To facilitate the agreement, I will relinquish operation of this line to the city after 30 years. In exchange for this relinquishment, I ask the Municipality for a subsidy of 40,500 francs, payable in annual installments of 13,500 francs. As for managing the transport fare, I will determine it later, as construction costs have not yet been fully calculated. Hoping you will look favorably upon my request, please accept, Mr. Mayor, the assurance of my highest consideration.

— Émile Picard

On November 25, 1901, Émile Picard was granted a 75-year concession for the Beauregard-Bregille Funicular, along with an annual subsidy of 1,900 francs. He established the Compagnie des Tramways Électriques au plateau de Beauregard to develop the project. Picard also requested a 6,000-franc subsidy from the Doubs department, citing public utility, but the General Council of the Doubs denied the funding on August 20, 1902: "The request, as presented, does not carry sufficient general interest to justify the financial support of the Department. The issue appears irregular, as it involves a request from an industrialist in support of a business he will operate; thus, it is not a public utility project. Moreover, the entrepreneur himself indicates he expects a return of 3.8% from the operation. Upon the request of Mr. de Moustier, the General Council postpones its decision and asks the Administration to provide a more thorough study." After failing to secure funding from the Doubs department, Émile Picard sought additional financial support from the Compagnie des Bains de la Mouillère, which had agreed to invest in the funicular project. The company, however, declined to provide further funds due to financial constraints.

=== Second project ===
Following earlier setbacks and in light of technological advancements, Émile Picard proposed a revised project in June 1905: an electric tramway 762 meters in length, terminating at the école des Hauts de Bregille. Unlike previous proposals, this version included detailed plans and technical studies, presenting a more concrete and developed initiative. The project once again attracted municipal interest, enabling Picard to renew his request to the General Council of Doubs. A decree of public utility was signed in August 1908, and a new agreement was established with the city of Besançon to renew the subsidy originally granted six years earlier.

In 1909, a specification document highlighted significant technical challenges for the proposed tramway along the Sentier de l'Aiguille, which had a 22% gradient. The document noted that the tramway's 30-horsepower motors were insufficient, stating: "It would have required a considerable force, a force that the Gas and Electricity Company was powerless to provide to the concessionaire with a current of 440 volts at an intensity of 220 amperes. And even if it had been able to provide it, the operation would have become costly." To address this, a 390-meter rack railway was incorporated for the steepest section with a 21% gradient, while the remaining section used a conventional tramway track with adhesion, featuring an 8% slope.

=== Final project ===
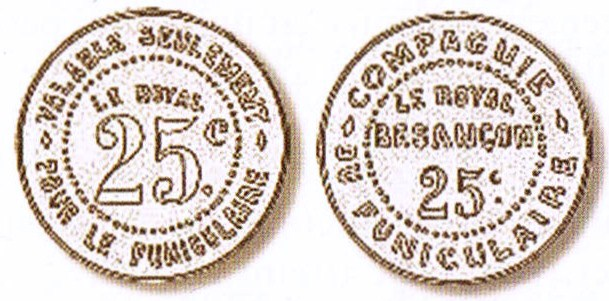
25-cent token for the funicular railway.

The final project consisted of two sections: a funicular system powered by an electric motor on the steep slopes of the Sentier de l'Aiguille, and a second section planned as a tramway line. The journey was to take place in two stages, with a transfer station at the Sentier de l'Aiguille. Opposite the upper station, a tramway departure station was built; however, the tramway section was never completed, as the anticipated population growth in the Bregille district did not materialize. The current garage structure corresponds to the foundations of this planned station. The estimated cost of the funicular section was 230,000 gold francs, with a projected annual ridership of 150,000 passengers. The company's capital was 230,000 francs, divided into 460 shares of 500 francs each. Principal shareholders included Charles Krug (mayor of Besançon from 1919 to 1925), Dr. Heintz, and Émile Picard, who held 50 shares (25,000 francs), representing over 10% of the capital. Initial earthworks began in June and July 1911, alongside a public utility inquiry conducted among Besançon residents. Construction of the funicular was assigned to the Louis de Roll company, based in Bern. The cars measured 8.5 meters in length and were equipped with two passenger compartments (16 seats total), a luggage compartment with a capacity for 8 to 10 people, and two platforms for the drivers. The first public trips took place on November 24, 1912. In February 1913, Picard signed a new agreement with the municipality, resulting in a public utility decree on March 6 of the same year. By this time, however, spa activity was already in decline, and the onset of the First World War was approaching. The funicular nonetheless served a diverse group of users, including craftsmen, farmers, workers, and soldiers stationed at Fort of Bregille. In 1912, fares were set at 0.15 franc for a one-way trip, 0.29 franc for a round trip, and 5.50 francs for a book of 50 tickets.

== Early operation ==
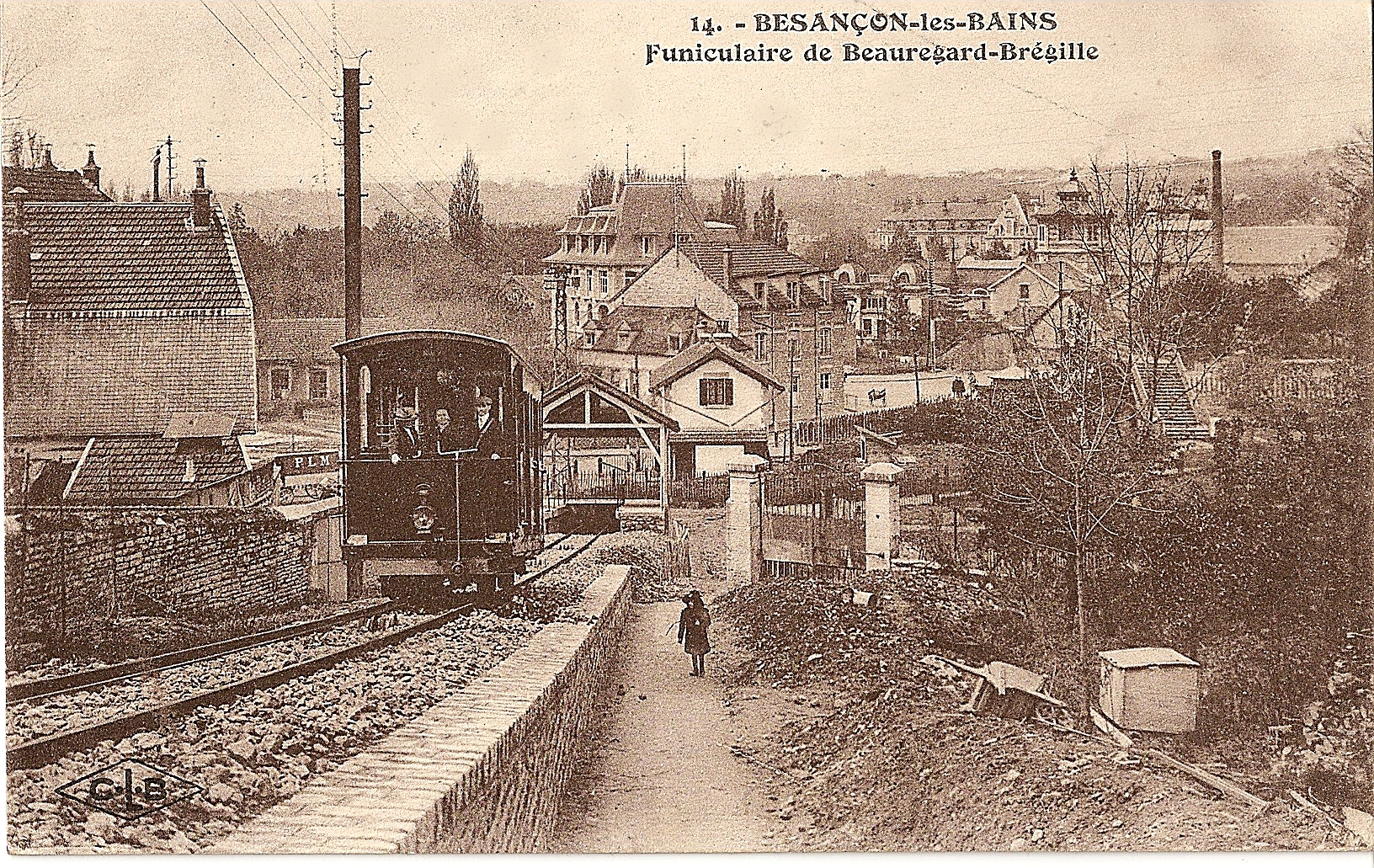
The funicular railway in 1913.

From 1912 to 1918, the funicular's operation was affected by several factors. Annual ridership fell short of the projected 150,000 passengers, as wartime conditions led to reduced tourism and the conversion of the baths into a care center for wounded soldiers. Financial challenges included the municipality's reluctance to provide subsidies and higher electricity rates from the Gas and Electricity Company, which charged the funicular a greater price per kilowatt-hour than the tramway company, despite the funicular's lower energy consumption. Some local residents objected to paying for funicular tickets; these protests prompted petitions but did not significantly alter operations. In 1914, the mobilization of all staff members for military service caused several weeks of interrupted service while replacements were recruited and trained. Although revenues were limited during 1912–1918, the funicular continued to operate throughout this period.

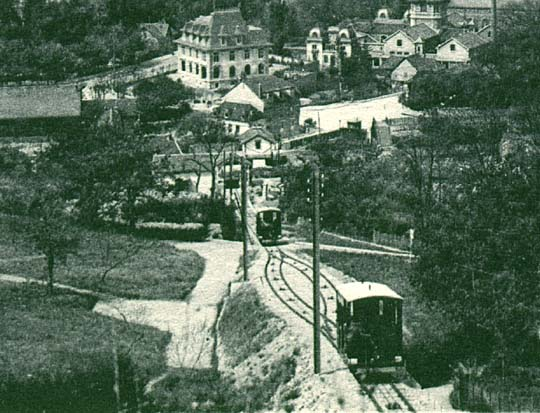
View of the funicular from the upper station.

In 1916, a report recounts an accident on January 15 of that same year: "Besançon, January 20, 1916 — Beauregard Funicular, collision with a horse belonging to Mr. Peuteuil — Report of the subdivision officer. Description: In a report dated January 15, Mr. Picard, delegated administrator of the Besançon electric tramway company to the Beauregard plateau, informed the City control services that at six o'clock in the evening, an accident occurred on the funicular track and a horse was caught under one of the company's cars and was strangled. One of Mr. Peuteuil's employees, a coal warehouseman, having a delivery to make to one of the houses on the Beauregard hillside, did not hesitate, to avoid carrying his goods on his back over too long a distance, to enter with his horse and cart into the Vaissier property, whose gate he opened in order to cross the funicular track at the level crossing reserved exclusively for said property. It was nearly six o'clock in the evening, the night was complete, and the cart had no lantern. Upon arriving on the axis of the level crossing, the horse slipped on the rail and fell across the track just as the funicular was starting. The driver tried to remove the horse's harness to pull it more quickly out of danger, but due to the complete darkness, he was unable to do so. So, he left the horse on the track and went in front of the ascending funicular car shouting at the wattman to stop. The latter, at first surprised, hesitated for a moment but finally applied the brakes, but a bit too late, so the car caught the horse sideways and dragged it about two meters before stopping. Additionally, the mechanic at the upper station, seeing his amperage suddenly rise from 12 to 40, understood that an obstacle was on the track and cut the power. Besides the horse that was killed, the material damage consisted of a broken side panel and various minor damages, such as the locks of the doors of car two which were bent or damaged. Repairs took the entire day of the 15th, during which service could not operate."

== From the golden age to the first challenges ==
=== The golden age ===
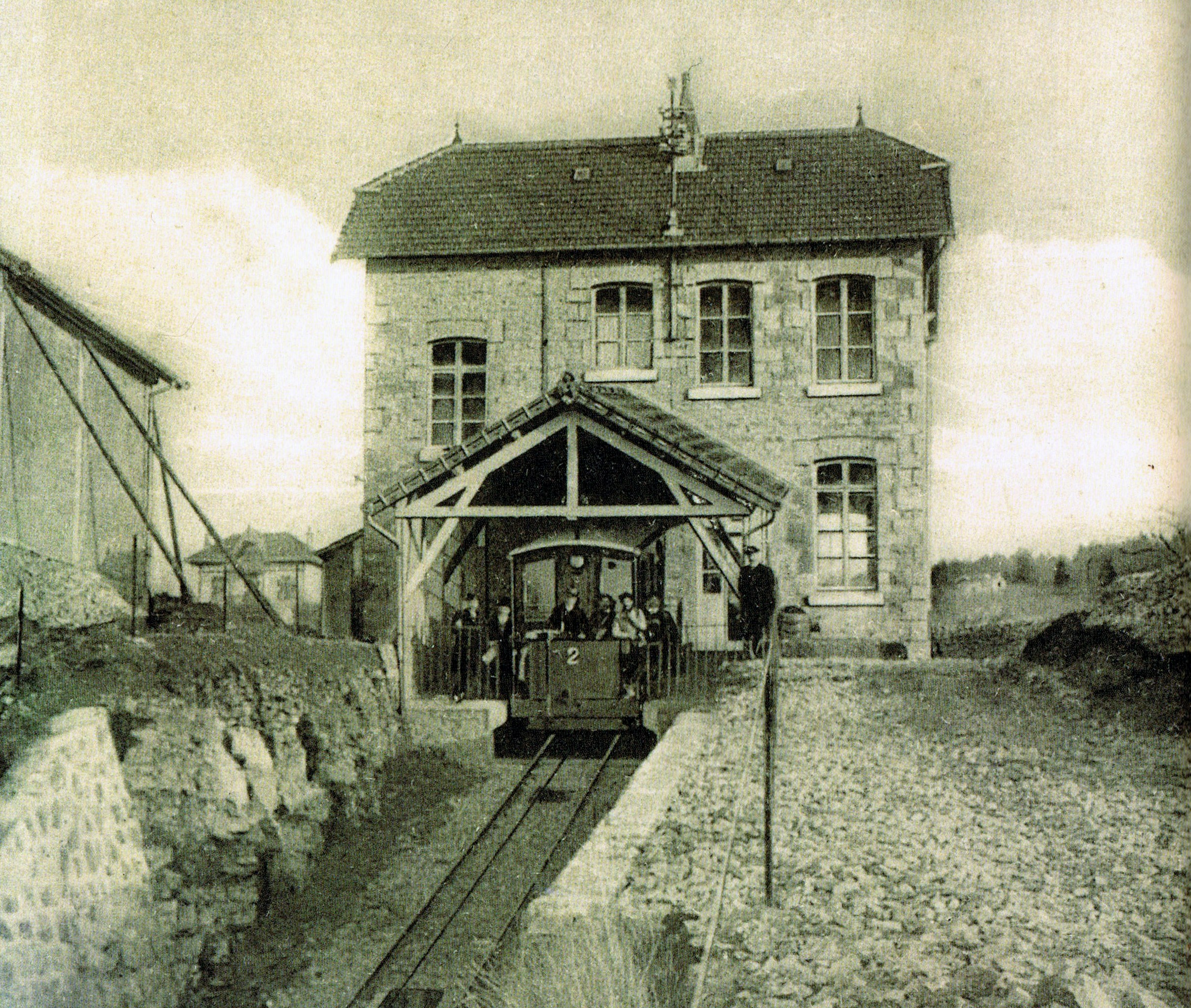
The upper station at the beginning of the 20th century.

During the 1920s, the Beauregard-Bregille Funicular saw significant growth, reaching 176,000 passengers in 1929, surpassing the projected 490 passengers per day. In 1927, the Compagnie des Tramways Électriques au plateau de Beauregard recorded a peak profit of 18,500 francs, accounting for one-third of its total historical profits. However, rising prices from 1918 posed challenges, as tariff adjustments required approval from the Municipality and the General Council of Doubs due to the public utility decree, often causing delays and financial losses. In 1921, Émile Picard threatened to request the Council of State to annul the decree to gain freedom in setting tariffs. In April 1926, a staff strike led to wage increases and fare adjustments.

Fares were increased in 1919, 1923, 1925, and 1926. During this period, Picard frequently highlighted the company's financial difficulties, apparently to secure additional subsidies. He also expressed dissatisfaction with the municipality's attitude toward the funicular, as reflected in letters and interviews, including the statement: "I end my letter by once again noting the systematic obstruction against the Funicular Company which nevertheless deserves more goodwill if public authorities realized the importance of the services rendered by this small railway and which has given the Bregille plateau an interesting development to the City through numerous constructions and the visit of thousands of foreigners coming to marvel at the incomparable panorama enjoyed from the heights of this magnificent plateau."

Émile Picard fell seriously ill in 1928 and resigned from his position as Delegated Administrator. Shortly before his resignation, he wrote to the mayor: "Besançon, June 26, 1928 — Mayor of Besançon — Sir, I have the honor to inform you that I have just read in the newspaper of June 26 that the Funicular Administration is requesting a small subsidy. Very tired, and adding my 79 years in two months, I have resigned as Delegated Administrator. This enterprise, which is my work, deserves to be supported; you know the services it renders to the population. To complete my work, I confirm what I have verbally communicated to you, namely that I have bequeathed to the City of Besançon, among other legacies, a sum of twenty-five thousand francs, with the condition that the municipality creates a square on the land of the upper funicular station platform, leaving a passage for travelers. I remain at your disposal, Mr. Mayor, for any further information. Please accept, Mr. Mayor, the assurance of my devoted sentiments. — Émile Picard, still president of the Board of Directors of the Company."

=== After Picard and the first challenges ===
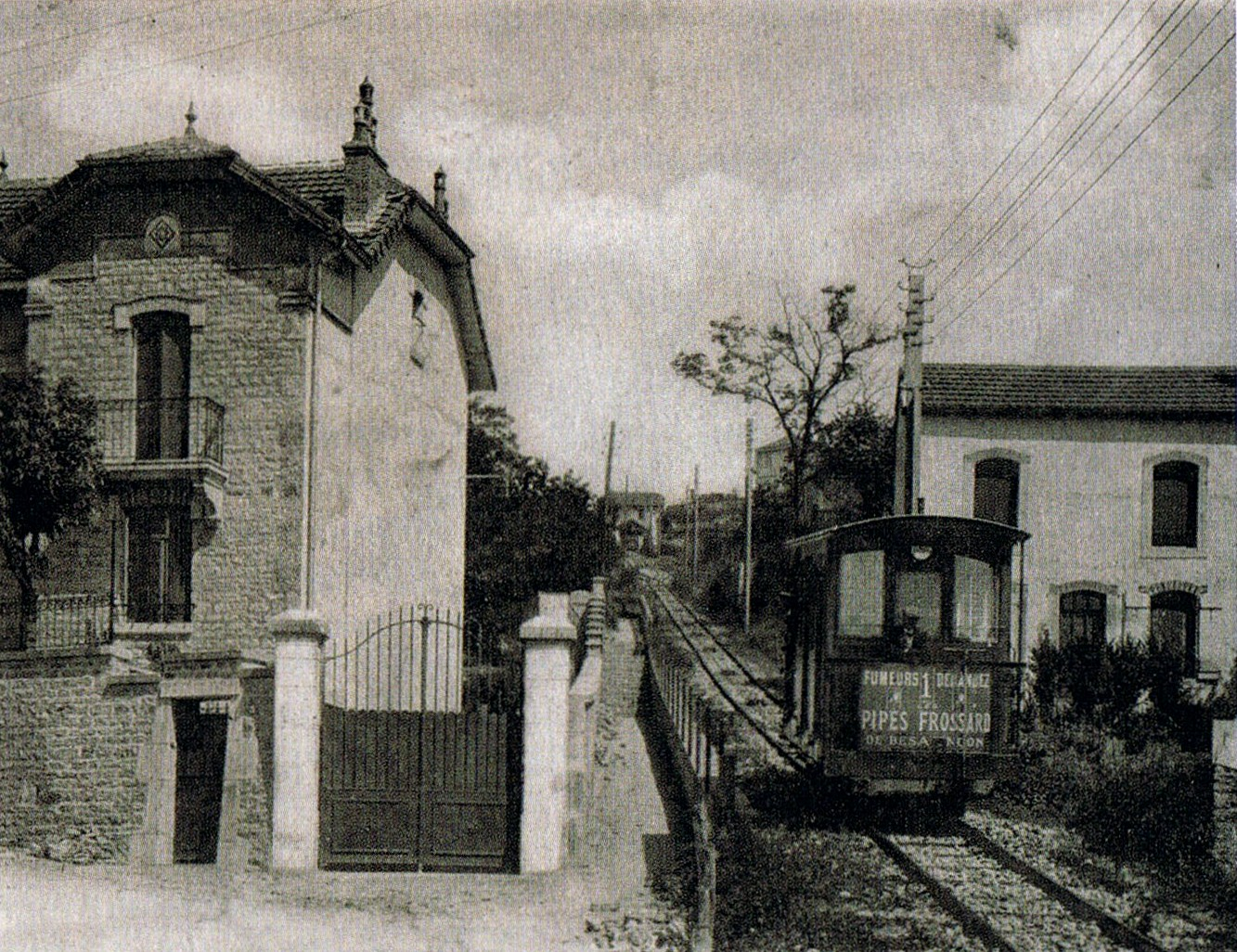
The funicular railway, 1920s or 1930s.

Joseph Billiotte, a shareholder and insurer in Besançon, succeeded Émile Picard as head of the Compagnie des Tramways Électriques au plateau de Beauregard. In 1938, extensive repairs were conducted on the funicular, including wheels, paintwork, and tracks, necessitating a replacement bus service during peak hours—the first major suspension of operations. Ridership remained stable at 150,000–160,000 passengers annually from 1928 to 1935 but declined from 1936 to 1939. The Popular Front government's social laws required hiring three additional staff for 40-hour workweeks, compounding financial strain from a 1937 ridership drop, 1938 repairs, service interruptions, and a staff strike that increased wages by 12%. The company's deficit grew to 3,600 francs in 1936 and reached 52,000 francs in 1938. Billiotte secured 65,000 francs in municipal aid to cover the deficit, though with difficulty.

In 1940, the Compagnie des Tramways Électriques au plateau de Beauregard faced ongoing financial difficulties and sued the city of Besançon before the prefectural council for unpaid debts of 95,000 francs. During World War II, the municipality prioritized other matters, and the lawsuit strained relations with the company. In 1941, the French State's Minister of Public Works proposed a reconciliation between the city and the company to address the issue.

== During World War II ==
=== Buyout of the company ===
Following repayment difficulties and a decline in passenger numbers, article 19 of the specifications was invoked: "The city of Besançon shall always have the right to buy back the Company." This option was preferred over alternatives, which included either relinquishing the city's loan—merely postponing the problem—or allowing the Company to go bankrupt, which would have halted the funicular's operation. Consequently, the transport commission decided to proceed with the buyback. In 1941, Jean Minjoz, then deputy mayor responsible for transport, proposed purchasing the Company for 195,500 francs. However, Billiotte deemed this amount unacceptable, noting that when accounting for the deficit, statutory interest, and central administration fees, the total buyout would amount to 445,500 francs.

After several negotiations, a final purchase price of 350,000 francs was agreed upon. The buyout was approved by the municipal council on October 22, 1941, and the city acquired the funicular on January 23, 1942, although its future remained uncertain. The shareholders accepted the decision, and the prefecture of Besançon granted approval in October 1942. The buyout agreement was officially signed on November 20, 1942. Following some deliberation, the municipality provisionally established a management authority on February 25, 1943, initially intended for a three-year period. On April 1, 1943, the city became the definitive owner of the funicular, and the Company of Electric Tramways of the Beauregard-Bregille plateau was dissolved after more than 41 years of operation, succeeded by the Bregille Funicular Management Authority.

=== The bombing of July 16, 1943 ===
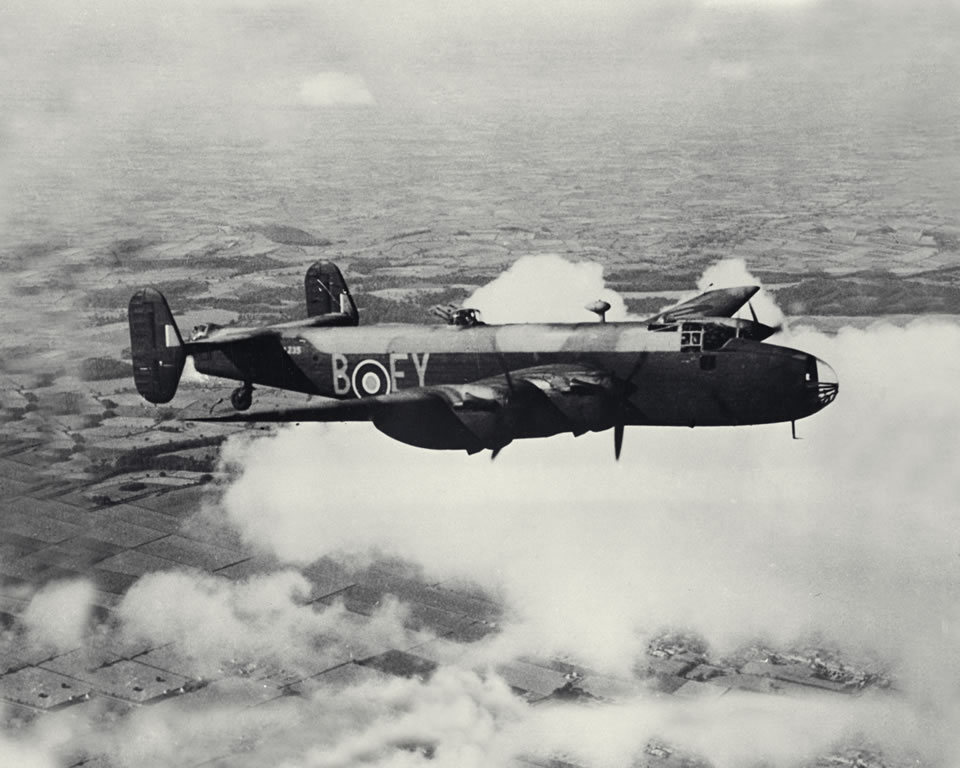
A Halifax bomber.

On the evening of July 15, 1943, 165 Halifax Pathfinder bombers departed from southwest England, targeting the Peugeot factories in Sochaux. Besançon was selected as an alternative target to divert German night fighters. Around 1 a.m. local time, a scout plane collided with a German Dornier 217-J fighter, resulting in an exchange of fire. The Dornier then struck the English Halifax before crashing into the Besançon-Viotte station.

Subsequently, about fifteen Halifaxes bombed Besançon in a scattered formation, causing approximately fifty casualties, mostly civilians. The Bregille funicular was also bombed by a plane that released its bombs prematurely. It was later determined that nine bombers mistakenly believed they had destroyed the Peugeot factories. A witness reported seeing flashes from the use of flash bombs intended to photograph targets. The central safety device of the funicular was damaged, but the two stations and the cars remained intact. Operations were suspended and did not resume until January 1945.

== Funicular management authority ==
=== From post-war to the 1970s ===
On August 1, 1945, the city council appointed Mr. Laporte, then head of the road service section, as Director of the Municipal Funicular Authority. In 1944, the authority recorded a profit of 52,000 francs, increasing to 95,000 francs in 1945, with a total of 222,000 passengers that year—a figure that remained unmatched. Despite these profits, financial difficulties persisted due to maintenance work on the cars and lighting, leading to a subsidy of 600,000 francs being granted. In the 1950s, available records indicate 150,467 passengers and significant maintenance on the vehicle traction cables and road surface.

In the early 1960s, passenger numbers remained stable, ranging between 110,000 and 120,000, before declining to 94,000 by the end of the decade. From the 1970s, ridership decreased significantly, dropping from 94,000 passengers in 1969 to 64,000 in 1972, 38,000 in 1979, and slightly increasing to 40,000 in 1980. This decline is attributed to increased automobile use and the introduction of a minibus service in 1976, which provided multiple stops on the Bregille plateau with direct connections to the city center.

=== 1980s ===
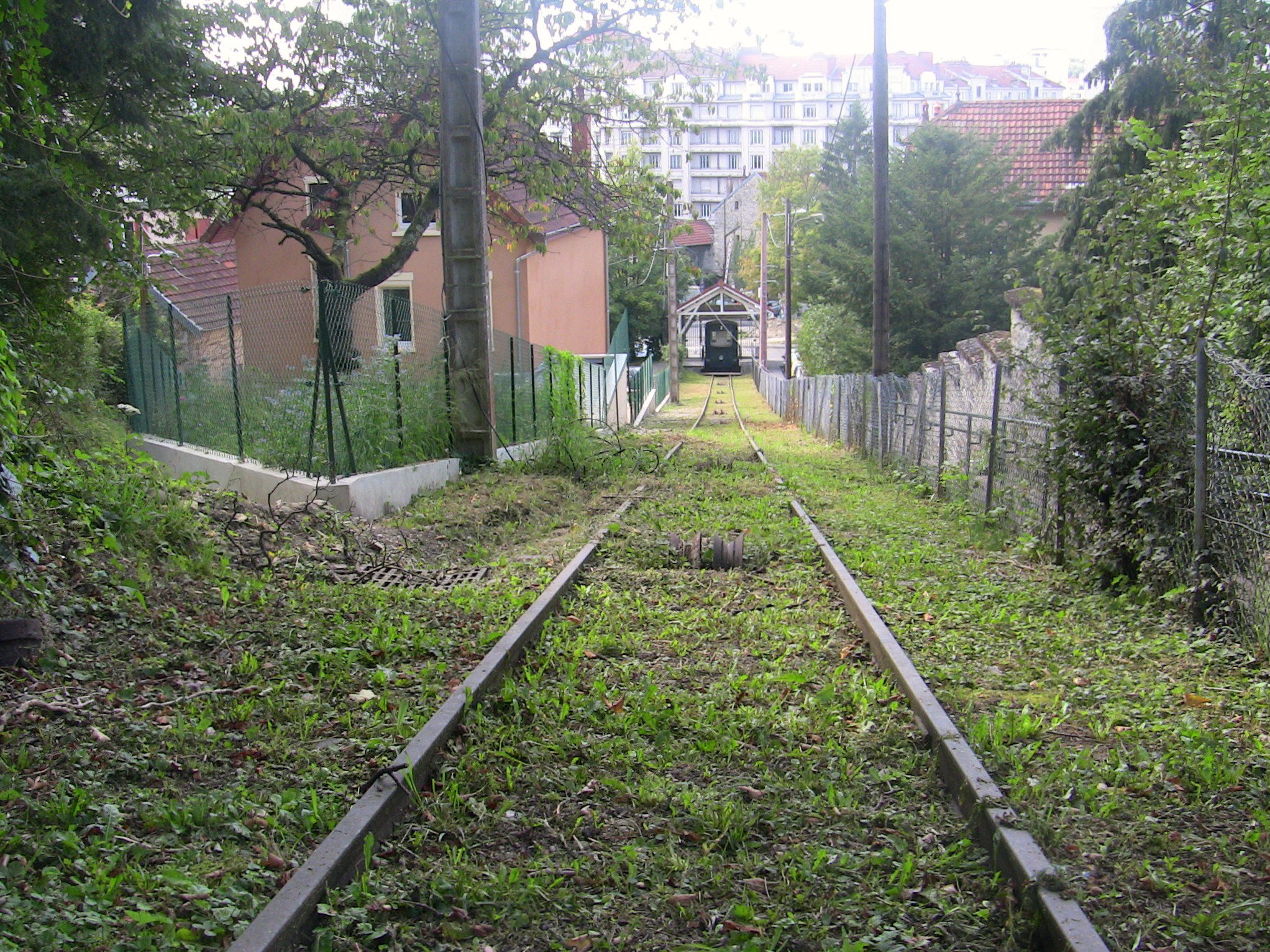
The funicular rails today.

During the 1980s, the decline in ridership continued, raising concerns about the funicular's viability due to increasing operational costs. Between 1972 and 1979, the city's contribution per passenger rose from 1.43 francs to 8.39 francs. At the municipal council session on October 22, 1980, a decision was made to refurbish the cars and continue operations. In early 1981, the cars were dismantled sequentially and repaired at the Pelouse workshops in Saint-Ferjeux. The wooden bodies were rebuilt on their original chassis, with curved plexiglass windows replacing the previous flat ones on the motorman's cabin. The roofs were also reconstructed, and the plywood was painted copper-green to modernize the appearance while maintaining waterproofing.

The December 1981 issue of the Journal of Bregille featured a poetic tribute to the funicular's refurbishment: "Ode for the glorious refurbishment of the funicular, pardon we had thought cynically, of the insidious theft of your rolling charms, but now today your mechanical beauty resolutely turns its back on the black death. You reign, already heavy with your future successes, ready to leap to the green summit of the climb, which will soon ring only for you in the blue sky. Your dress has taken the tone of rural sunflowers, with a hint of sparkling copper on the forehead, and your cheek is adorned with the reflections one sees arise on the brilliant plexiglass of your so-round snout. Ah! your half will be happy tomorrow, when at the sweet crossing of parallel tracks, your flanks will brush with a light wingbeat, under the emotional gaze of your human friends, now sung by our melodious choirs, and may joyful corks pop on our tables for your new century that sprouts before our eyes! All this to say that it would be necessary to stop derailing and that a little lively party in honor of this good old beast that has renewed its beauty would not be to be scorned! The Itch."

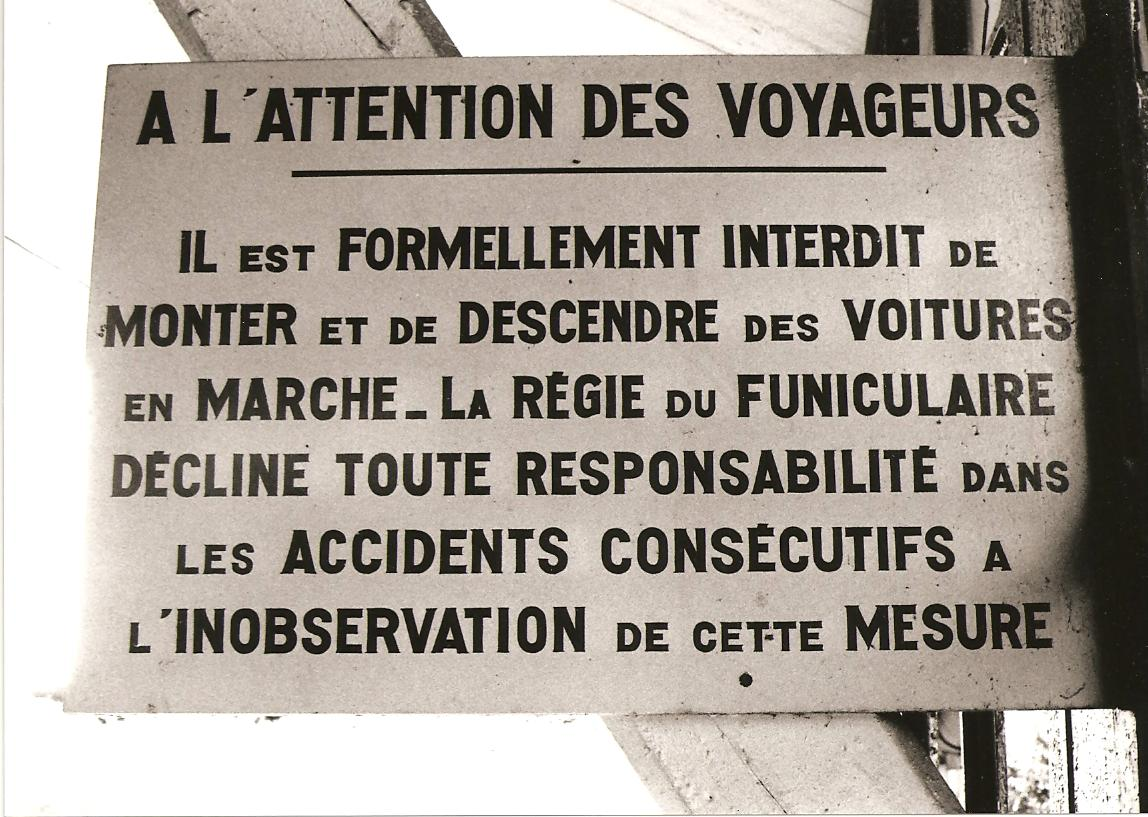
A sign for the funicular railway, in 1990.

Despite the refurbishment and updated appearance, ridership declined by 15% in 1981. In response, the city and neighborhood committee adjusted the funicular's schedule in January 1982 to better accommodate tourist use and reduce costs. Operations were limited to Wednesdays, Saturdays, and Sundays during winter, and daily from 1:30 p.m. to 7 p.m. in summer (June 1 to September 15). This change prompted a petition with 200 signatures from Bregille residents, who requested daily service. Following a meeting with the mayor on March 13, 1982, the schedule was revised: the funicular operated Mondays, Tuesdays, Thursdays, and Fridays from 10:30 a.m. to 12 p.m. and 4:30 p.m. to 7:30 p.m.; Wednesdays from 10:30 a.m. to 12 p.m. and 1:30 p.m. to 7:30 p.m.; and weekends from 1:30 p.m. to 7:30 p.m. However, ridership continued to decline, with 25,191 passengers in 1982 and 22,286 in 1983.

Starting July 1, 1983, the municipality allowed subscribers of CTB buses and holders of bus tickets to use the funicular free of charge, resulting in a 59% increase in ridership that year. In 1984 and 1985, passenger numbers exceeded 30,000, but the funicular remained unprofitable, generating 38,000 francs in revenue against expenses of 485,000 francs, including 413,000 francs for personnel costs. Ridership declined again in 1986 to 25,046 passengers. Although two free rides were offered in a booklet for new residents of Besançon, the funicular remained a marginal tourist attraction and was not included in most brochures about monuments and activities in the city.

=== The closure of the funicular ===
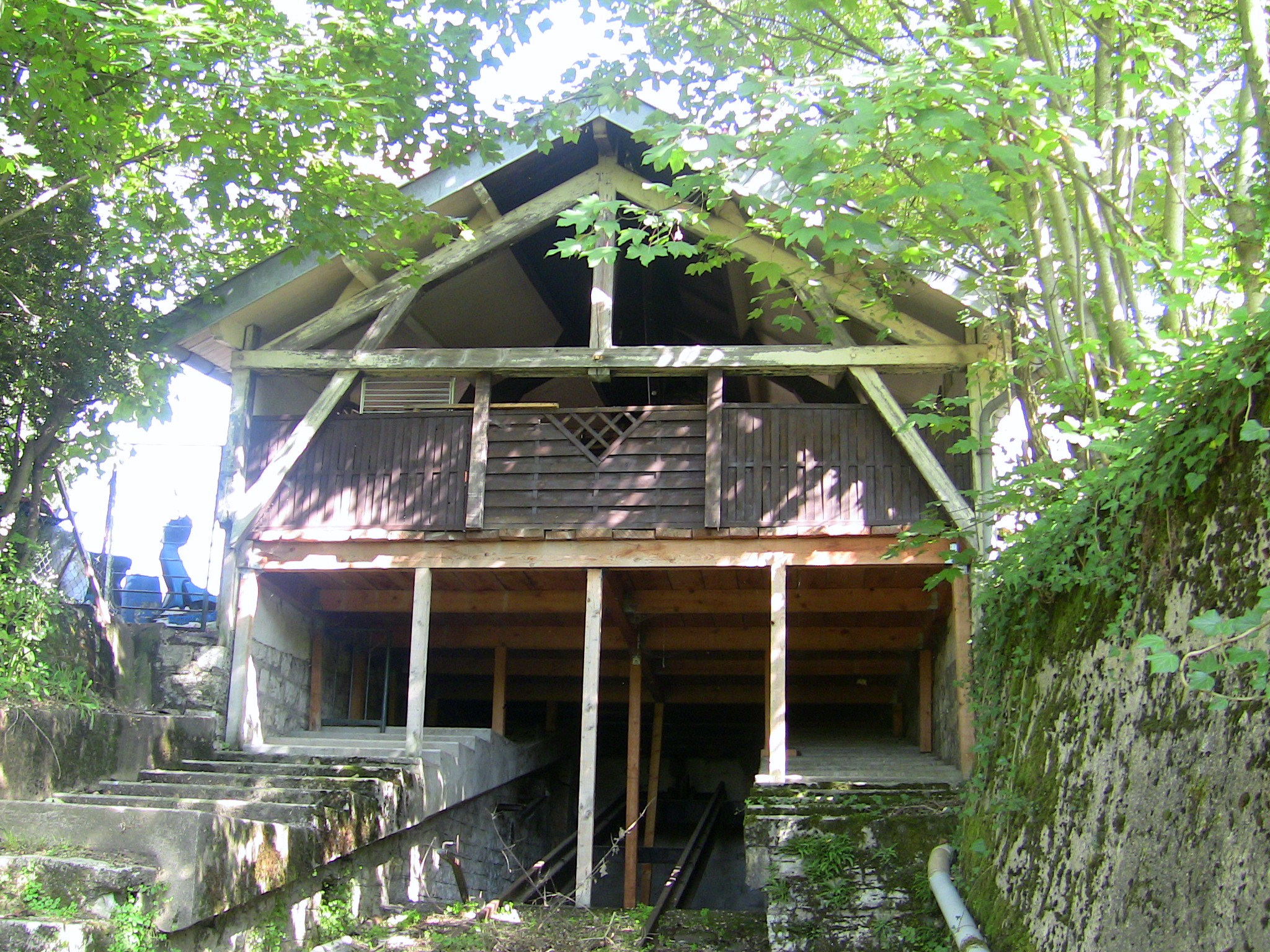
The upper station, in 2010.

On March 12, 1987, the Beauregard-Bregille Funicular suspended operations for track consolidation, including ballast replacement and the installation of 80 metal sleepers, with service resuming by late April 1987. On May 27, 1987, during a routine inspection, the management authority's director identified several issues: approximately 100 meters from the upper station, the track was detached from the ballast over a five-meter section; 30 meters from the lower station, rail alignment was defective due to track slippage; and the switch exhibited significant wear, with outer rails reduced by 14 millimeters. Consequently, the funicular was closed on the day of the inspection, pending expert examination of the defective components.

To reopen the funicular as a tourist attraction, the city requested cost estimates for restoration. Only the Von Roll company submitted a report on July 1, 1987, estimating the restoration cost at 1,083,000 francs. Due to the high cost and lack of sponsors, the Management Authority closed the funicular for safety reasons while seeking funds for repairs. The cars were dismantled and stored, with car number 2 making its final trip on board with a motorman, two city photographers, and two journalists from L'Est Républicain. Although no permanent closure was initially planned, the city integrated the Authority's heritage into its assets and proceeded to liquidate it in January 1989.

In 1989, the Besançon railway modeling club created a scale model of the funicular and part of the Mouillère station. In 1990, the Junior Economic Chamber of Doubs briefly explored the possibility of reopening the line, including development near Fort Beauregard by the upper station. The renovation project proposed by the company Skirail involved replacing the historic line with an automated single glass cabin. This project was abandoned in 1992 due to its estimated cost of 10 million francs and lack of support from local officials and residents, who favored preserving the original line. In 1993, the upper station was converted into social housing by the Municipal Office of Social Housing.

== Association of Friends of the Besançon Funicular ==
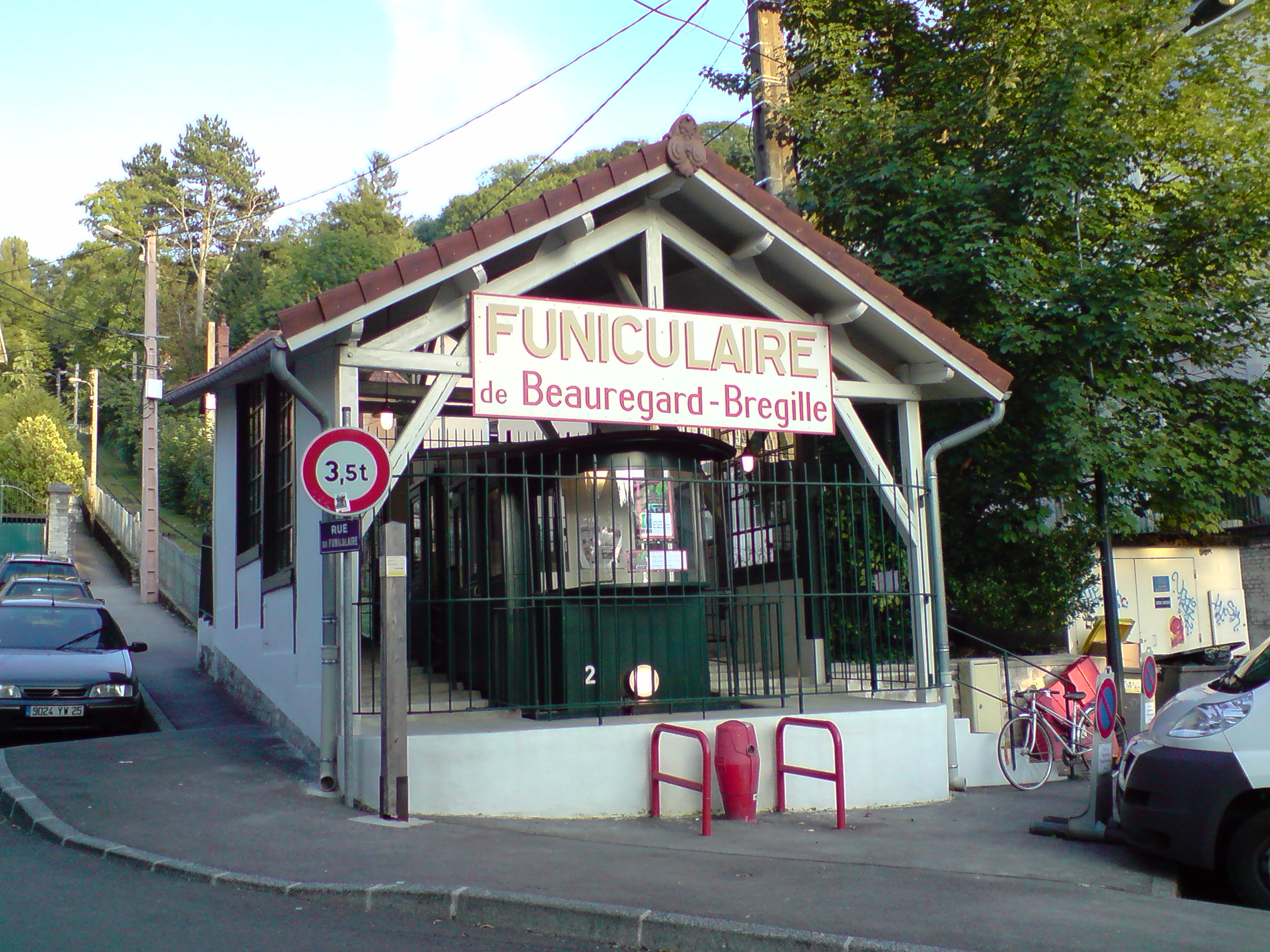
The lower station, in 2008.

On December 9, 2005, the association Les Amis du Funiculaire de Besançon (The Friends of the Besançon Funicular) was founded by Alexandre Jury, a student interested in preserving this heritage. A campaign for the funicular's rehabilitation was subsequently launched. In 2007, car number 2 was renovated by the municipal workshops of Besançon, and the lower station was restored by the reintegration company Alternative Chantiers. The restored site was presented during the European Heritage Days on September 15 and 16, 2007, attracting over 1,300 visitors who participated in guided tours organized by the association, which had 220 members at the time.

Since 2008, the association has worked on rehabilitating the upper station and developing a broader renovation project. Activities are regularly held at the lower station, particularly during Heritage Days. The association initiated the proposal to list the funicular as a Historic Monument in January 2007. This was approved by the Regional Commission for Heritage and Sites of Franche-Comté following a recommendation from the Regional Directorate of Cultural Affairs in June 2010. The listing was officially signed by the regional prefect on January 27, 2011. The centenary of the funicular was celebrated on September 15 and 16, 2012, in connection with the European Heritage Days, organized by the association and the Bregille-Prés-de-Vaux Residents' Consultative Council.

Since its renovation, the lower station and the entire line have been regularly featured in guided tours organized by the Besançon Tourist Office and the Association, particularly during Heritage Days.

In 2016, Grand Besançon Habitat, successor to the municipal social housing office, lifted rental restrictions on the upper station, allowing occasional public access to the entire site.

In 2022, the association secured funding from the city to commission a technical study estimating the costs of restarting the funicular. The study, conducted by TIM Ingénierie in the latter half of the year, was presented to local authorities in early 2023.

== Connections ==
	Stop	Municipalities served	Connections
o	LA MOUILLERE	Besançon	5 21 Ginko
o	BEAUREGARD	Besançon	21 Ginko

== Frequency ==
Changes in funicular ridership
1929	1932	1935	1945	1957	1969	1972	1979	1980	1982	1983	1985	1986
176,000	156,389	160,000	222,000	150,467	94,000	64,000	38,000	40,000	25,191	22,286	30,000	25,046

== See also ==
- Funicular
- Bregille

== Bibliography ==
- Tonon, Hector; Culot, Jean-François; Henckel, Marie-Édith; Mathieu, Annie; Mathieu, Jacques; Bidalot, Georges; Bévalot, Jacqueline; Broquet, Paul; Monti, Jean-Claude (2009). Mémoires de Bregille [Memoirs of Bregille] (in French) (2nd ed.). Besançon: Cêtre. ISBN 978-2-87823-196-0.
- Gavignet, Jean-Pierre; Estavoyer, Lyonel (1989). Besançon autrefois [Besançon in the past] (in French). Horvath. ISBN 2-7171-0685-5.
- Gennesseaux, Jean (1992). Funiculaires et crémaillères de France [Funicular railways and rack railways in France] (in French). Éd. La Vie du Rail. ISBN 9-782902-808427.
- Dutriez, Robert (1984). La Seconde Guerre mondiale en Franche-Comté [World War II in Franche-Comté] (in French). Cêtre. ISBN 2-901040-41-1.
- Fohlen, Claude (1994). Histoire de Besançon [History of Besançon] (in French). Vol. 2. Cêtre. ISBN 2901040276.
