= Palente-Orchamps-Saragosse =

District in Besançon, France

- District
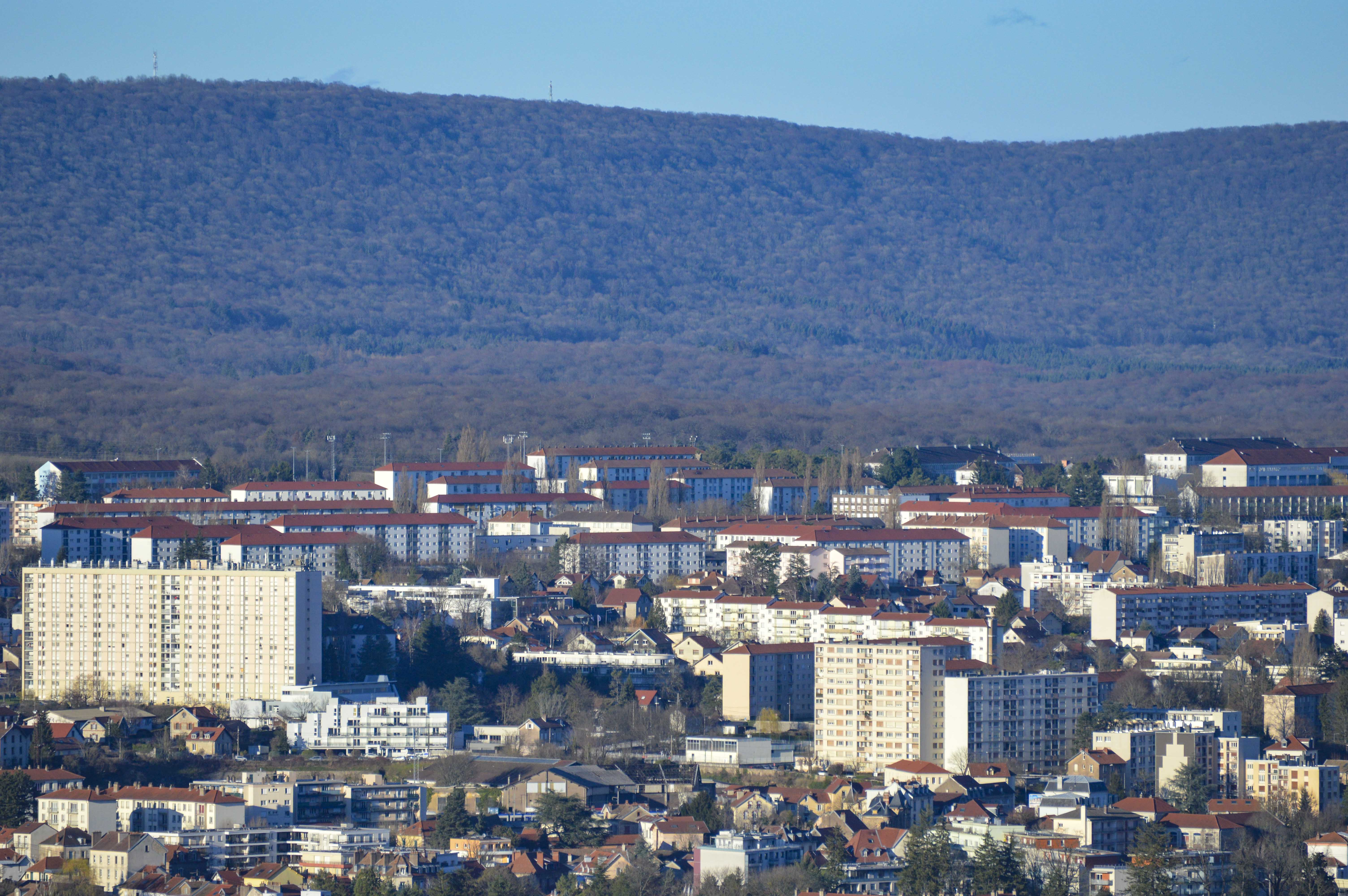
- General view from Fort de Chaudanne.

- Location of the district (highlighted) within the commune of Besançon.
- Coordinates: 47.266155°N 6.048532°E
- Country: France
- Region: Bourgogne-Franche-Comté
- Department: Doubs
- City: Besançon
- Canton: Besançon-3
- Established: 20th century

Area
  - Total: 1.6 km^{2} (0.62 sq mi)
- Highest elevation: 340 m (1,120 ft)
- Lowest elevation: 310 m (1,020 ft)

Population (2014)
  - Total: 10,569
  - Density: 6,600/km^{2} (17,000/sq mi)
- Time zone: UTC+1 (CET)
  - Summer (DST): UTC+2 (CEST)

Palente-Orchamps-Saragosse is a district in Besançon, France, located in the eastern part of the city. Constructed primarily during the 1960s, the area had over 5,300 residents in 1990.

== History ==
The site of the present-day Palente district is first mentioned as "Parlante" in a document from 1271, followed by "Palente" in 1345.

According to local historian Eveline Toillon, the name "Palente" derives from the Latin term pa(bu)lantem, meaning land suitable for forage or pasture. This etymology aligns with the area's historical use for cereal cultivation.

In 1452, a tileworks was established in the area.

The historic core of Palente, known as Palente-Village, consists mainly of former farmhouses clustered around the Chemin de Palente, at the intersections with the Chemins des Courtils, du Grand-Buisson, and de l'Ermitage. The junction of the modern Boulevard Blum and Rue de Belfort once housed the Auberge Comtoise and its ballroom (demolished in the 2000s), which previously served as a stagecoach relay and a rest stop for loggers transporting wood from the nearby Forêt de Chailluz to Besançon.

During the winter of 1870, a redoubt was constructed on the hill overlooking the district as part of the city's defenses against the German advance, alongside 13 other positions. (Note: See Franco-Prussian War.) Following the defeat, General Séré de Rivières oversaw the construction of a network of forts and batteries around the city, (Note: See Séré de Rivières system and Fortified region of Besançon.) incorporating some existing sites. The Palente hill thus became the location of Fort Benoit.

Throughout the 19th century, the Palente area served as a military maneuver field, remaining under army ownership until May 1951, when the municipality purchased the 16 hectares for 20 million francs. This acquisition facilitated the rapid development of social housing—834 units were planned in the master plan—to address post-war population growth. Construction began in 1952–1953, concurrently with the Montrapon-Fontaine-Écu development. Most of these buildings, originally designed to last about 30 years, were still standing as of 2011. Similar to Planoise, they are predominantly low-rise structures of up to five stories. The district is now designated as a priority neighborhood.

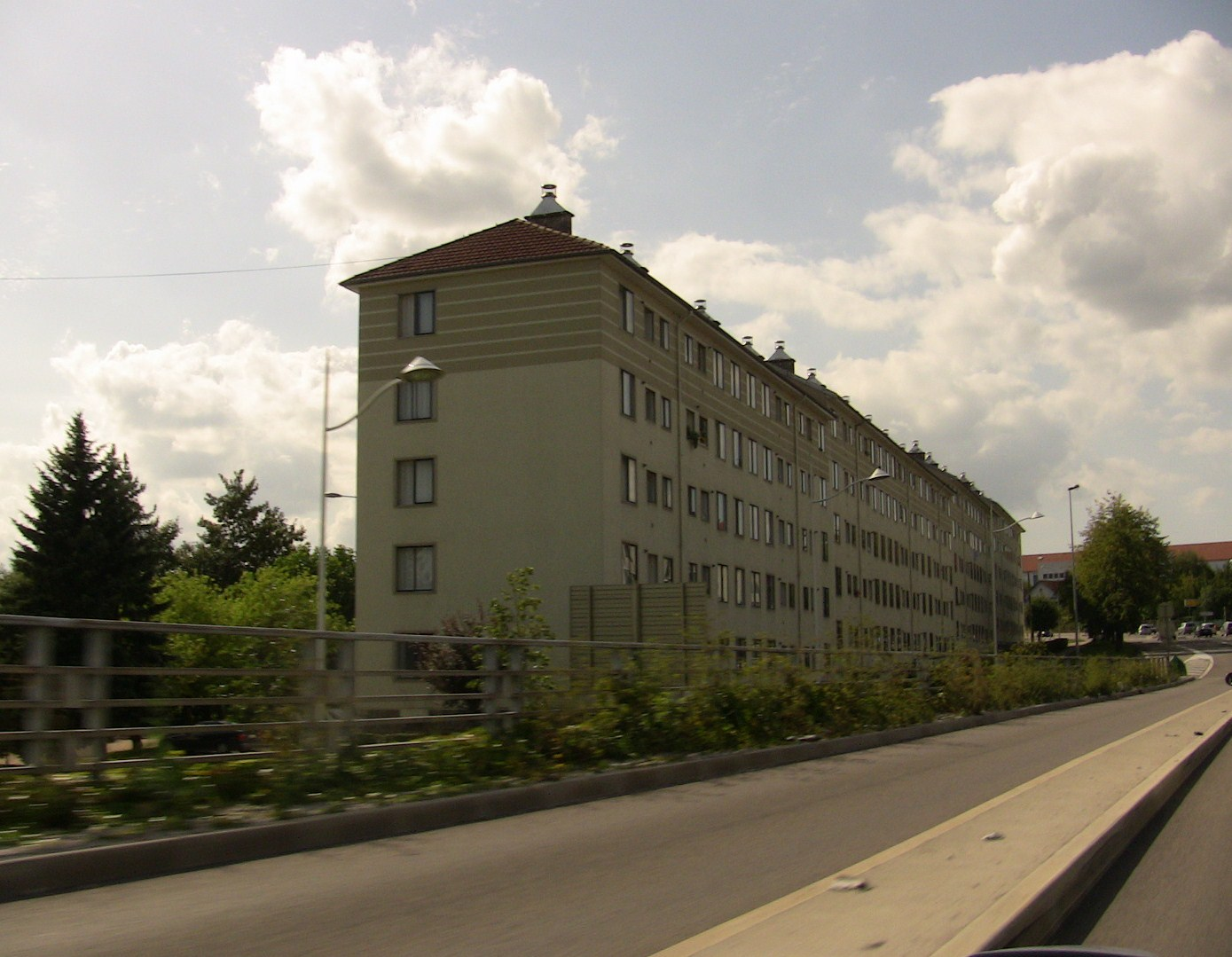
A building in Les Orchamps

The foundation stone for the Church of Saint Pius X was laid in spring 1957. The neighborhood's community hall was inaugurated in June 1959, and the Palente–Les Orchamps Popular Cultural Center was established that September.

In 1964, Louis Pergaud High School—currently the largest in the Besançon Academy—held its first classes. The following year, 1965, saw the district bisected by the construction of Boulevard Léon Blum.

The district's most notable historical event occurred between 1973 and 1978, when it became the epicenter of the Lip affair, attracting national and international media attention. The local watchmaking company sparked one of the 20th century's most significant social conflicts.

Since the early 2000s, the district has undergone substantial transformations, mirroring changes across Besançon. These include building renovations, aesthetic improvements (such as the redevelopment of Place des Tilleuls), and complete reconstructions (e.g., the Scaremberg block). It forms part of a priority neighborhood alongside Les Orchamps.

== Demographics ==
Year	Population
1999	12,110
2006	11,190
2010	10,738
2015	10,804

Source: CCAS

== Sports and cultural facilities ==
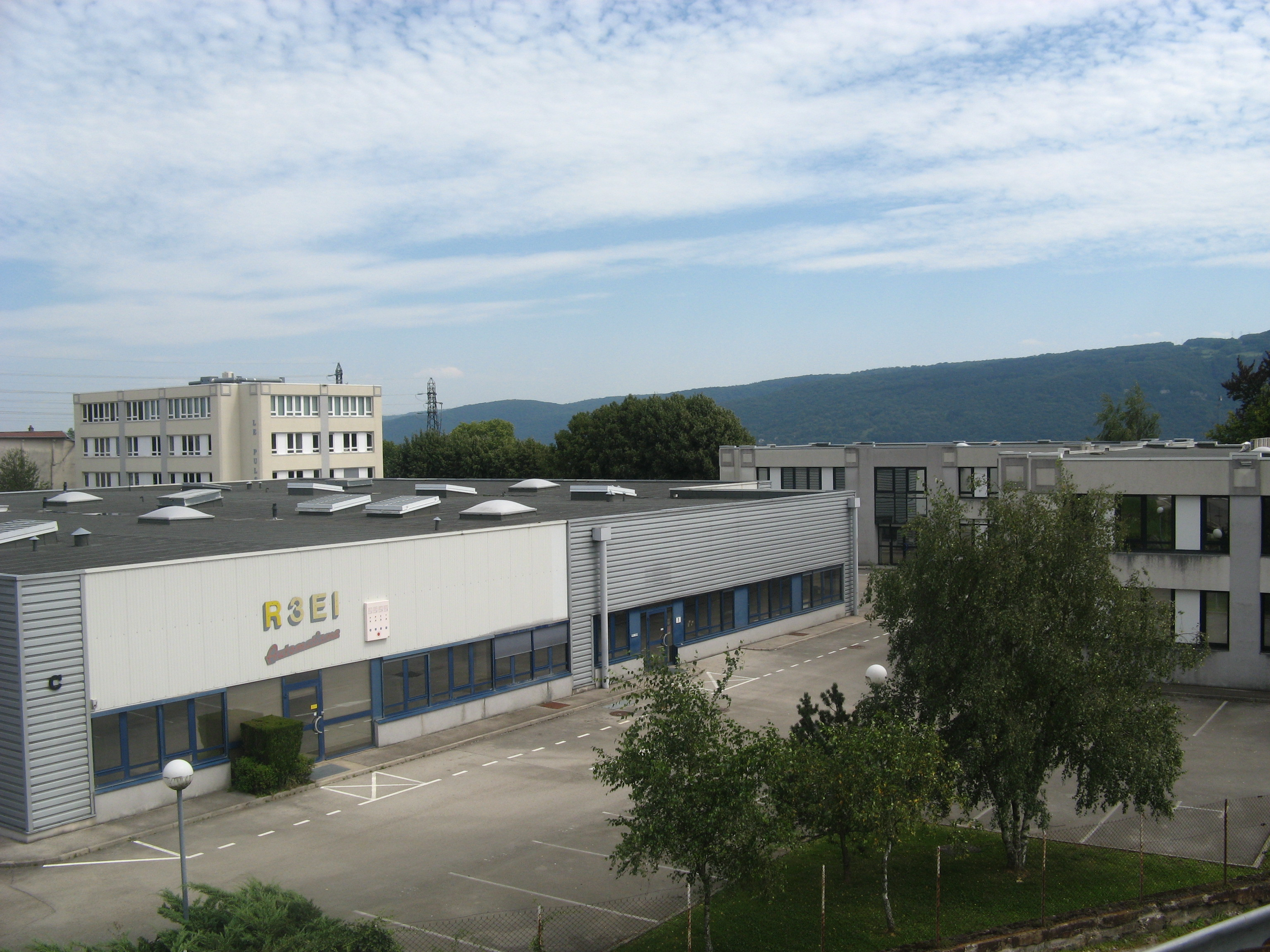
The Palente district; here, the industrial zone

- M.J.C. Palente (youth and cultural center)
- Stade des Orchamps (sports stadium)
- Gymnase Jean Zay (gymnasium)
- Gymnase des Orchamps (gymnasium), home of Palente Besançon Handball

=== Sports clubs ===
- Olympique de Besançon Rugby
- ASOB – A.S. les Orchamps-Besançon, Orchamps Football School
- A.S. Palente-Orchamps Handball
- F.C. Orchamps O.P., an amateur football club

== Infrastructure ==
- Crèche des Orchamps (daycare)
- Centre social des Orchamps (social center)

=== Administrative buildings ===
- ANPE (now part of Pôle emploi)
- ASSEDIC (now part of Pôle emploi)

=== Education ===
Nursery schools

- Condorcet Public Nursery School
- Jean Zay Public Nursery School
- Edouard Herriot Public Nursery School
- Pierre et Marie Curie Public Nursery School

Primary schools

- Condorcet Public Primary School
- Jean Zay Public Primary School
- Pierre et Marie Curie Public Primary School
- Edouard Herriot Public Primary School

Secondary education

- Pierre-Joseph Proudhon Middle School
- Louis Pergaud High School

Higher education

- Franche-Comté Formation Argos

=== Industry ===
- DIXI Microtechniques, precision mechanics for defense, aeronautics, and medical sectors
- Polycaptil, engineering and manufacturing in opto-electronics and mechatronics
- The former Lip factory site, built around the Château de la Palante, (Note: This château was owned by General Jacques Terrier, Baron de la Palante.) has been converted into a business incubator hosting numerous companies.

=== Transport ===
Public transport in the city is managed by the Ginko bus company. The district is served by:

== Neighborhood associations ==
- Association Palente
- Arc en Ciel
- La Jeunesse de Palente
- ARTAIDE
- Un quartier pour une cause

== See also ==
- Battant (Besançon)
- Bregille
- Centre-Chapelle des Buis
- Chaprais-Cras
- Combe Saragosse
- Planoise
- History of clockmaking in Besançon
- LIP (company)
- The Lip affair
- Sensitive urban zone
