= Departmental Council of Doubs =

Departmental legislature in France

Departmental Council of Doubs Conseil départemental du Doubs

Leadership
- President: Christine Bouquin, LR since 2 April 2015

Structure
- Seats: 38
- Political groups: Government (24): DVD (11); LR (11); Agir (2); Opposition (14): DVG (6); PS (4); G.s (1); NPA (1); PCF (1); RE (1); www.doubs.fr

The Departmental Council of Doubs (French: Conseil Départemental du Doubs) is the deliberative assembly of the Doubs department in the region of Bourgogne-Franche-Comté. It consists of 38 members (general councilors) from 19 cantons and its headquarters are in Besançon.

The President of the General Council is Christine Bouquin.

== Vice-Presidents ==
The President of the Departmental Council is assisted by 11 vice-presidents chosen from among the departmental advisers. Each of them has a delegation of authority.

List of vice-presidents of the Doubs Departmental Council (as of 2021)
Order	Name	Canton	Delegation
1st	Ludovic Fagaut	Besançon-5	Work, integration and social action
2nd	Florence Rogeboz	Pontarlier	Mobility and infrastructure
3rd	Philippe Alpy	Frasne	Territorial development, attractiveness and European and cross-border affairs
4th	Béatrix Loizon	Ornans	Management and preservation of natural heritage, climate transition and tourism
5th	Denis Leroux	Morteau	Autonomy of the elderly and disabled, of the development and uses of digital technology
6th	Chantal Guyen	Besançon-2	Colleges
7th	Jean-Luc Guyon	Montbéliard	Sport, culture, youth, public reading and departmental archives
8th	Patricia Lime-Vieille	Valdahon	Children and families
9th	Serge Rutkowski	Besançon-3	Human resources, buildings and general resources
10th	Jacqueline Cuenot-Stalder	Morteau	Habitat and housing
11th	Olivier Billot	Ornans	Management and financial optimization

== See also ==
- Doubs
- General councils of France
- Departmental Council of Doubs (official website)
