= Bart, Doubs =

Bart
- Commune
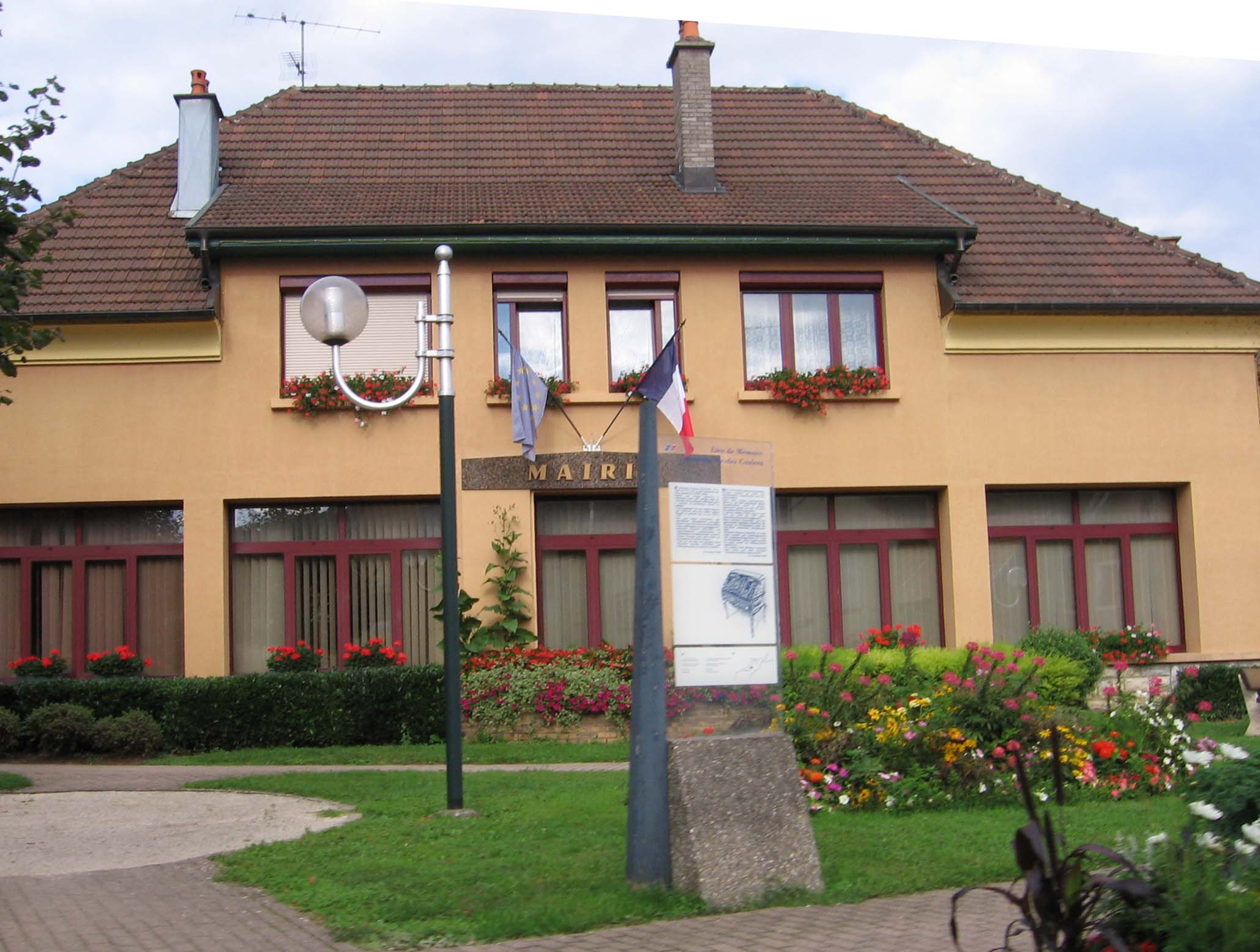
- Town hall

- Coat of arms
- Location of Bart
- Location within France Location within Bourgogne-Franche-Comté
- Coordinates: 47°29′34″N 6°46′20″E
- Country: France
- Region: Bourgogne-Franche-Comté
- Department: Doubs
- Arrondissement: Montbéliard
- Canton: Montbéliard
- Intercommunality: Pays de Montbéliard Agglomération

Government
  - Mayor (2020–2026): Eric Lamy
- Area^{1}: 3.84 km^{2} (1.48 sq mi)
- Highest elevation: 480 m (1,570 ft)
- Lowest elevation: 309 m (1,014 ft)
- Population (2023): 1,985
  - Density: 517/km^{2} (1,340/sq mi)
- Time zone: UTC+01:00 (CET)
  - Summer (DST): UTC+02:00 (CEST)
- INSEE/Postal code: 25043 /25420
- ^{1} French Land Register data, which excludes lakes, ponds, glaciers > 1 km^{2} (0.386 sq mi or 247 acres) and river estuaries.

Bart (French pronunciation: [baʁ]) is a commune in the Doubs department in the Bourgogne-Franche-Comté region in eastern France.

== Population ==
Historical population
Year	Pop.	±% p.a.
1968	1,516	—
1975	1,852	+2.90%
1982	1,874	+0.17%
1990	2,074	+1.28%
1999	2,076	+0.01%
2007	1,937	−0.86%
2012	1,952	+0.15%
2017	1,980	+0.29%
2023	1,985	+0.04%
Source: INSEE

== See also ==
- Communes of the Doubs department
