= Fort of Beauregard (Besançon) =

Fortification in Besançon built between 1791 and 1870

Coordinates: 47.2405°N 6.0365°E

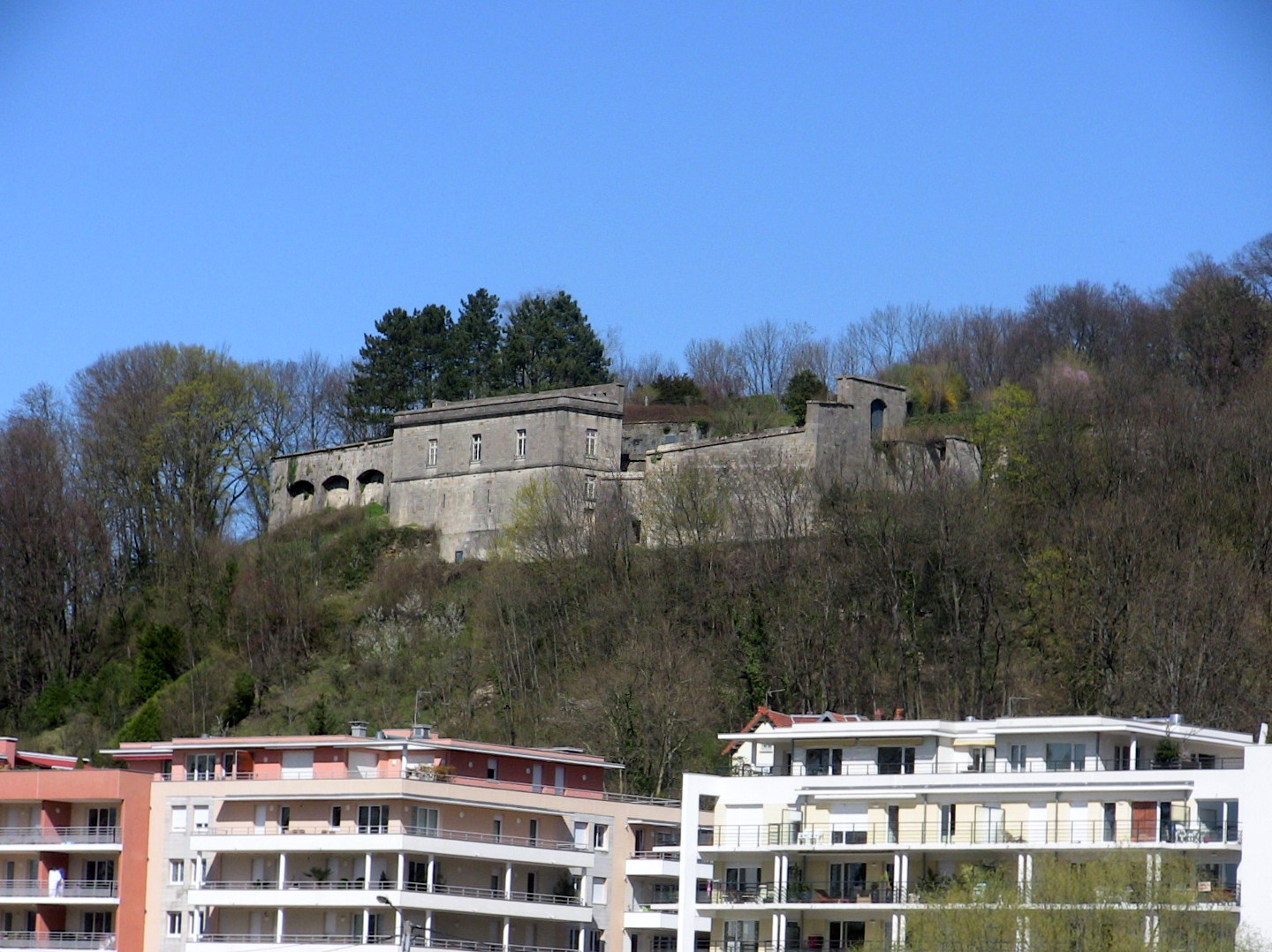
The fort of Beauregard.

The Fort of Beauregard is a fortification located in the French city of Besançon. It is now a historic monument and is open to the public during Heritage Days.

== History ==
After two wars (in 1674 when Louis XIV of France took the city from the Spanish, and in 1814 when Austria declared war on Napoleon I), the French military decided to build a fort on Bregille hill, to defend the old city of Besançon. This hill is higher than the principal fortification of the city, the citadel of Besançon. Because the hill's strategic position had been used against the city in the past, the necessity for a real military defense there had become evident, and so the fort was built. The first fort on the site was built in 1791; it was captured in 1814 during the Six Days' Campaign. To improve the city's defences, Jacob François Marulaz had another fort built on the site. It may have taken its name from a farm by that name dating back at least to the 17th century.

== Sources ==
- Dutriez, Robert (1981). Besançon, ville fortifiée: de Vauban à Séré de Rivières (in French). Cêtre. ISBN 978-2-901040-20-0.

== See also ==
- Bregille
- Besançon
