= Canton of Montbéliard =

Coordinates: 47.51°N 6.80°E

The canton of Montbéliard is an administrative division of the Doubs department, eastern France. It was created at the French canton reorganisation which came into effect in March 2015. Its seat is in Montbéliard.

It consists of the following communes:

1. Bart
2. Courcelles-lès-Montbéliard
3. Montbéliard
4. Sainte-Suzanne
