= Fort of Bregille =

Fortification in Besançon, France

Coordinates: 47.2405°N 6.0365°E

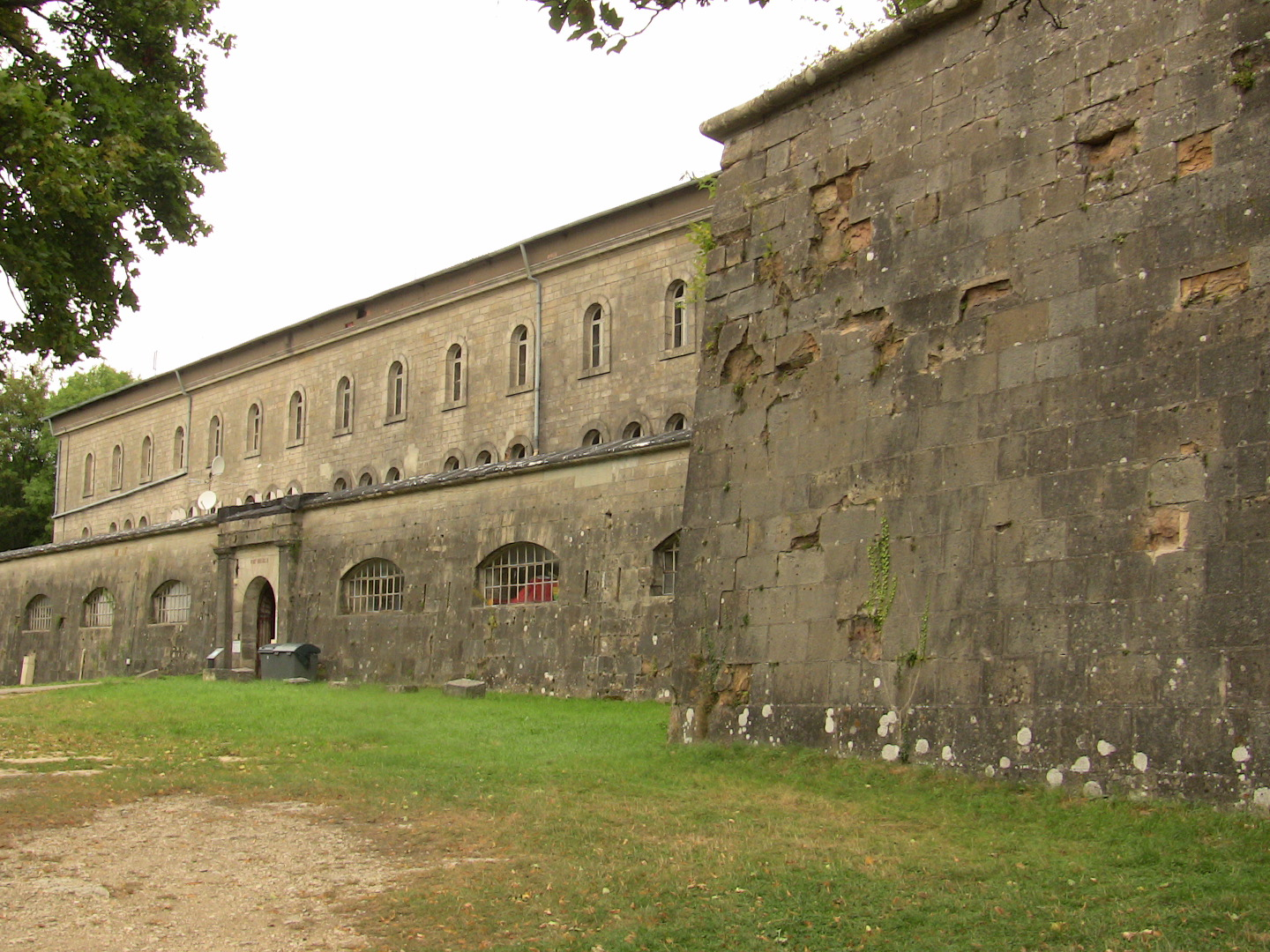
The fort of Bregille, principal facade.

The fort of Bregille is a fortification located in the French city of Besançon.

== History ==
After two wars (in 1674 when King Louis XIV took the city from the Spanish, and in 1814 when the Austrian Empire declared war on Napoleon I), the French military decided to build a fort on Bregille hill, to defend the old city of Besançon. This hill is higher than the principal fortification of the city, the citadel of Besançon. Because the hill's strategic position had been used against the city in the past, the necessity for a real military defense there had become evident, and so the fort was built. In 1831, King Louis Philippe I visited the building. The fort of Bregille wasn't utilised in the Franco-Prussian War or World War I, because the Franche-Comté was saved from these wars. During World War II, the fort housed an anti-aircraft battery. After the war, the building is reserved for the associations. Now, the inside of the fort is closed to tourists because it is in use by the police and by an animal protection society, but hikers may view the ramparts, and the hill provides a panoramic view of the town.

== See also ==
- Bregille
- Besançon
