= Bregille =

Coordinates: 47°14′32″N 6°2′28″E

Bregille (French pronunciation: [bʁəʒij]) is a district of the French city of Besançon, located on the right bank of the Doubs, south-east of the historic center. It has developed on the eponymous hill Bregille which culminates at 458 metres, almost 200 metres above the river level. It has about 6,500 inhabitants in the early 2000s.

== History ==
Originally, Bregille was a village of sheepherders and grape growers and several farms. In 1748 a Roman funerary monument in the form of an altar was discovered, evidence of a more remote past. There are accounts of an abbey in the seventh century, reportedly founded by Amalgar of Dijon, Duke of Upper Burgundy and brother in law of Waldalenus's son, Chramnelenus of Besançon (see also Adalrich, Duke of Alsace). The village was destroyed twice. The first time was in 1445 by the people of the Imperial City of Besançon to prevent the Dauphin Louis from using it as a base for attacking the town. The second time was in 1814 when General Jacob-Francois Marulaz did the same, though this time the enemy was the Prussians.

Between 1820 and 1832, the fort of Beauregard and the fort of Bregille, which overlook the quarter, were constructed.

At about 1 AM on July 15, 1943, British Halifax bombers dropped bombs on Bregille. The flight of bombers were heading for the Peugeot factories at Sochaux, with Besançon as an alternative target. Twenty bombers dropped their loads in a haphazard manner, causing some 50 casualties on the ground.

Between 1912 and 1987 a funicular joined the lower and higher parts of the quarter. During the bombing raid of 1943, it suffered from bombs from a bomber that had dropped its load prematurely. The funicular currently is the object of restoration efforts by an association, "Les Amis du Funiculaire de Besançon" (The Friends of the Funicular of Besançon).
