= Combe Saragosse =

District of Besançon, France

Coordinates: 47°16′04″N 6°01′53″E

Combe Saragosse (a.k.a. la Combe Saragosse) is a district of Besançon, capital and principal city of the Franche-Comté region in eastern France. One of the last urban area of Besançon, Combe Saragosse, is located in the northeast of the city, bordering the Orchamps and Palente.
