= Saone (disambiguation) =

The Saône is a major French river.

Other possible uses include:

- French ship Saône, five vessels named for the river
- Lakota people, which include people sometimes referred to as "Saone"
- Saône, Doubs, a city in France
- Sahyun Castle, in medieval French "Saone", since 1957 officially "Salah Ed-Din Castle" - in Syria
