= Le Gratteris =

- Part of Mamirolle
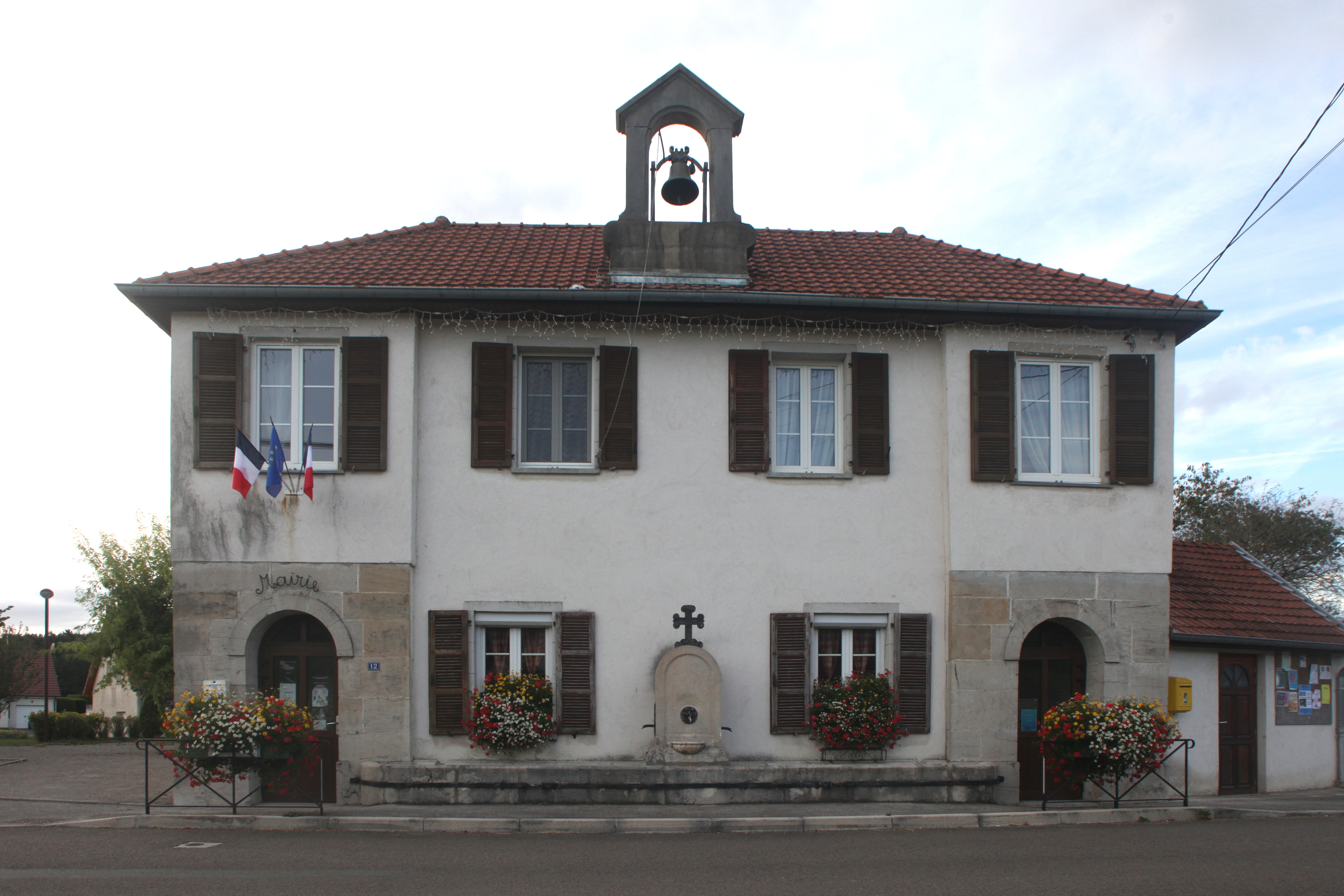
- The town hall in Le Gratteris
- Location of Le Gratteris
- Location within France Location within Bourgogne-Franche-Comté
- Coordinates: 47°11′03″N 6°08′20″E
- Country: France
- Region: Bourgogne-Franche-Comté
- Department: Doubs
- Arrondissement: Besançon
- Canton: Besançon-5
- Commune: Mamirolle
- Area^{1}: 2.97 km^{2} (1.15 sq mi)
- Highest elevation: 610 m (2,000 ft)
- Lowest elevation: 438 m (1,437 ft)
- Population (2022): 163
  - Density: 54.9/km^{2} (142/sq mi)
- Time zone: UTC+01:00 (CET)
  - Summer (DST): UTC+02:00 (CEST)
- Postal code: 25620
- ^{1} French Land Register data, which excludes lakes, ponds, glaciers > 1 km^{2} (0.386 sq mi or 247 acres) and river estuaries.

Le Gratteris is a former commune in the Doubs department in the Bourgogne-Franche-Comté region in eastern France. It was merged into Mamirolle on 1 January 2025.

== See also ==
- Communes of the Doubs department
