= Vaire-le-Petit =

- Part of Vaire
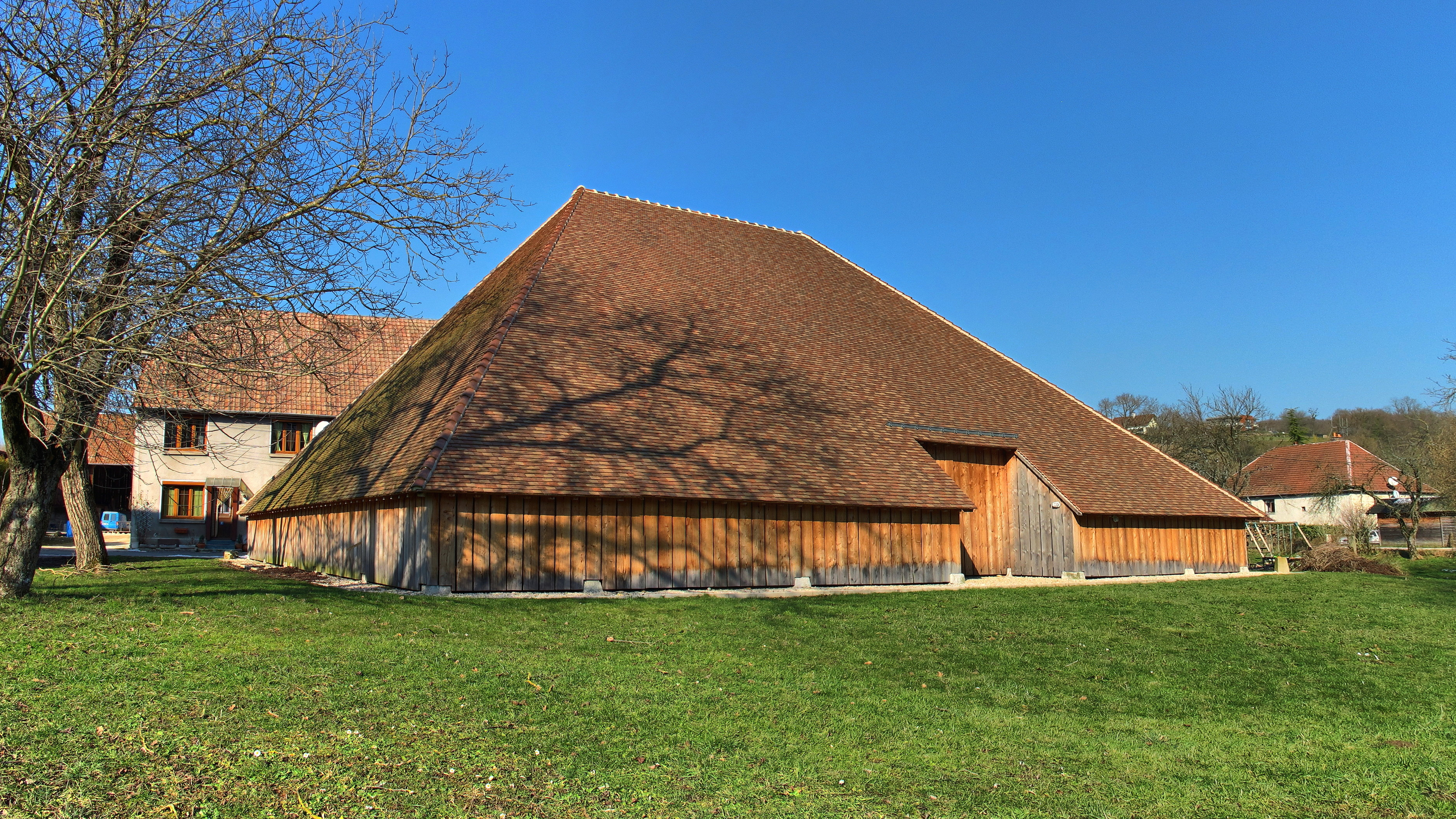
- Former tile factory
- Location of Vaire-le-Petit
- Location within France Location within Bourgogne-Franche-Comté
- Coordinates: 47°17′16″N 6°08′48″E
- Country: France
- Region: Bourgogne-Franche-Comté
- Department: Doubs
- Arrondissement: Besançon
- Canton: Besançon-5
- Commune: Vaire
- Area^{1}: 1.26 km^{2} (0.49 sq mi)
- Highest elevation: 378 m (1,240 ft)
- Lowest elevation: 249 m (817 ft)
- Population (2013): 226
  - Density: 179/km^{2} (465/sq mi)
- Time zone: UTC+01:00 (CET)
  - Summer (DST): UTC+02:00 (CEST)
- Postal code: 25220
- ^{1} French Land Register data, which excludes lakes, ponds, glaciers > 1 km^{2} (0.386 sq mi or 247 acres) and river estuaries.

Vaire-le-Petit (French pronunciation: [vɛʁ lə pəti]) is a former commune in the Doubs department in the Franche-Comté region in eastern France. On 1 June 2016, it was merged into the new commune of Vaire.

== See also ==
- Vaire-Arcier, on the opposite side of the river Doubs
