= Vaire-Arcier =

- Part of Vaire
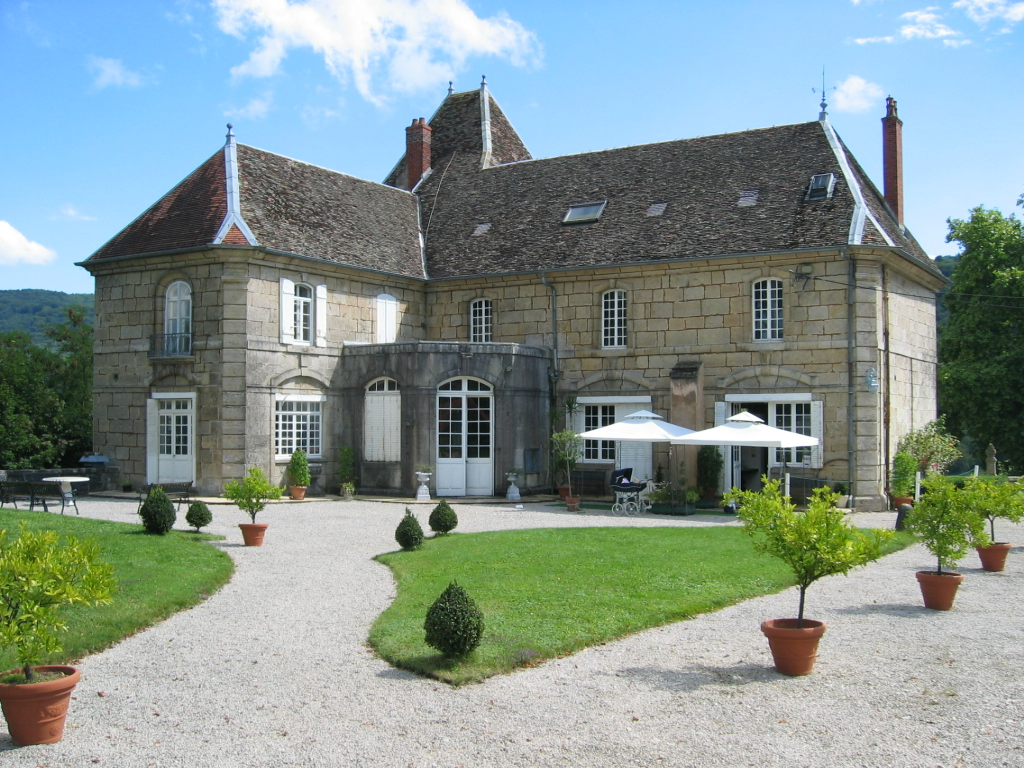
- Chateau of Vaire-le-Grand
- Location of Vaire-Arcier
- Location within France Location within Bourgogne-Franche-Comté
- Coordinates: 47°17′02″N 6°09′11″E
- Country: France
- Region: Bourgogne-Franche-Comté
- Department: Doubs
- Arrondissement: Besançon
- Canton: Besançon-5
- Commune: Vaire
- Area^{1}: 12.78 km^{2} (4.93 sq mi)
- Highest elevation: 561 m (1,841 ft)
- Lowest elevation: 243 m (797 ft)
- Population (2013): 542
  - Density: 42.4/km^{2} (110/sq mi)
- Time zone: UTC+01:00 (CET)
  - Summer (DST): UTC+02:00 (CEST)
- Postal code: 25220
- ^{1} French Land Register data, which excludes lakes, ponds, glaciers > 1 km^{2} (0.386 sq mi or 247 acres) and river estuaries.

Vaire-Arcier (French pronunciation: [vɛʁ aʁsje]) is a former commune in the Doubs department in the Franche-Comté region in eastern France. The communes of Vaire-le-Grand and Arcier were merged on 1 April 1974 to become Vaire-Arcier. On 1 June 2016, it was merged into the new commune of Vaire.

== Population ==
Population data refer to the area corresponding with the commune as of January 2016.

Historical population
Year	Pop.	±% p.a.
1962	381	—
1968	386	+0.22%
1975	384	−0.07%
1982	449	+2.26%
1990	474	+0.68%
1999	526	+1.16%
2006	515	−0.30%
2013	542	+0.73%
Source: EHESS and INSEE

== See also ==
- Château de Vaire-Le-Grand, located in Vaire-Arcier
- Vaire-le-Petit, located on the north bank of the Doubs
