= Mamirolle =

- Commune
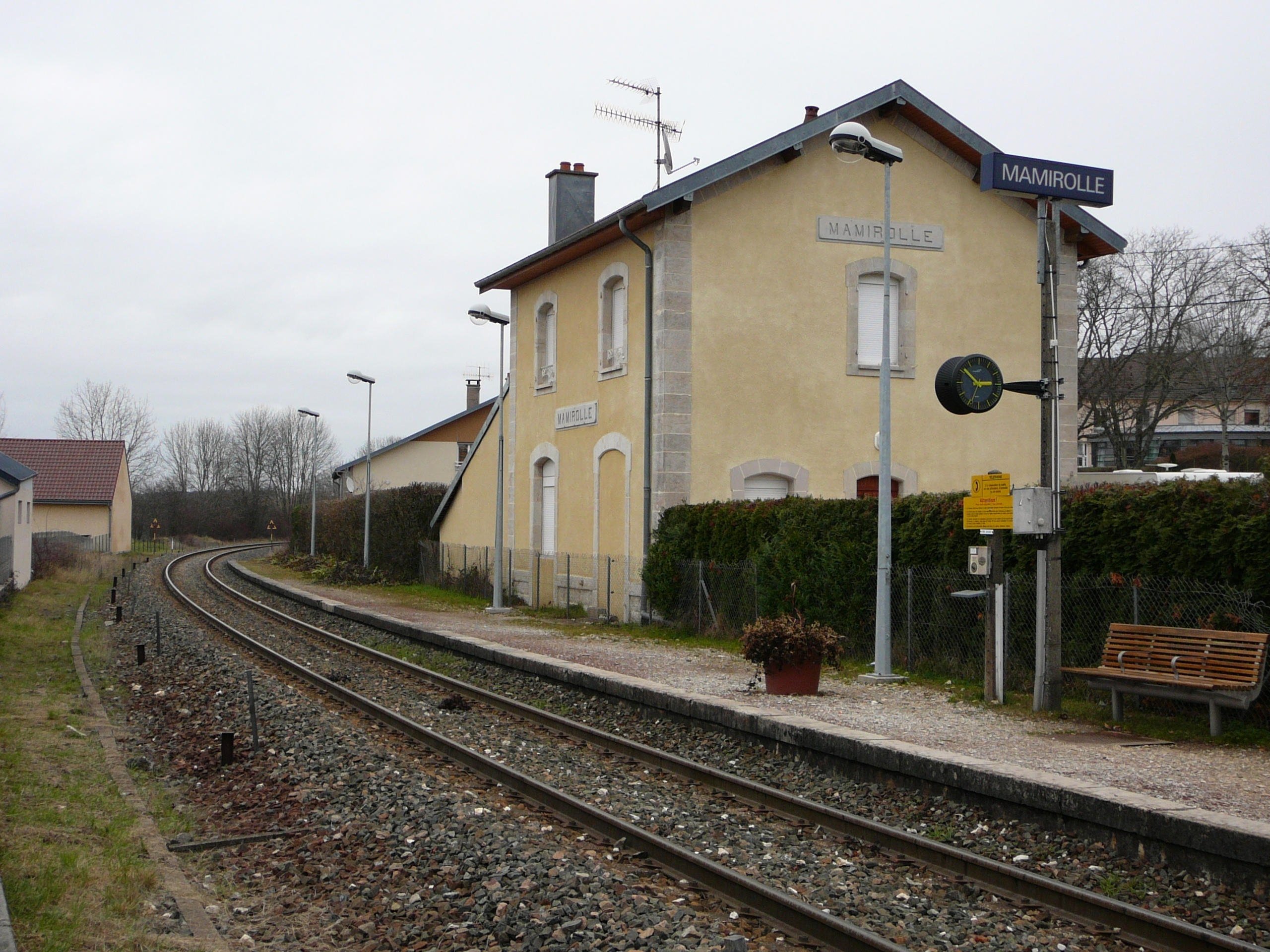
- Train station

- Coat of arms
- Location of Mamirolle
- Location within France Location within Bourgogne-Franche-Comté
- Coordinates: 47°11′52″N 6°09′44″E
- Country: France
- Region: Bourgogne-Franche-Comté
- Department: Doubs
- Arrondissement: Besançon
- Canton: Besançon-5
- Intercommunality: Grand Besançon Métropole

Government
  - Mayor (2025–2026): Daniel Huot
- Area^{1}: 14.46 km^{2} (5.58 sq mi)
- Highest elevation: 666 m (2,185 ft)
- Lowest elevation: 425 m (1,394 ft)
- Population (2023): 1,988
  - Density: 137.5/km^{2} (356.1/sq mi)
- Time zone: UTC+01:00 (CET)
  - Summer (DST): UTC+02:00 (CEST)
- INSEE/Postal code: 25364 /25620
- ^{1} French Land Register data, which excludes lakes, ponds, glaciers > 1 km^{2} (0.386 sq mi or 247 acres) and river estuaries.

Mamirolle (French pronunciation: [mamiʁɔl]) is a commune in the Doubs department in the Bourgogne-Franche-Comté region in eastern France. On 1 January 2025, the former commune of Le Gratteris was merged into Mamirolle.

== Geography ==
The commune lies 14 km (8.7 mi) southeast of Besançon on the first plateau of the Jura Mountains. It is situated at the foot of a wooded hill and is crossed by the railroad from Besançon to Le Locle.

The landscape of the town forms a wide basin with no surface drainage, since the rainwater seeps into the subsoil. Most of the land in Mamirolle is arable land and meadow land, with some parts covered in forest. Southern part of the commune extends over the slope of Mamirolle to the wooded ridge of Mont Bon, which forms the highest point in the commune at 662 m above sea level.

== History ==
Archeological research determined that Mamirolle was populated very early on. A nearby Tumulus dates from the Hallstatt period, and traces of an alleged Gallo-Roman settlement site was also discovered.

Mamirolle was first mentioned in 1220 as a church with the name Mamirollis. Over time, the spelling was changed to Mimiroles (1150), Memiroules (1267), and Memiruelles (1350), until it changed to today's Mamirolle in 1547. Since the Middle Age, Mamirolle has been belonging to the Montfaucon dominion. With the Treaties of Nijmegen in 1678, the village was passed over to France along with the rest of Franche-Comté. Mamirolle was repeatedly devastated by major fires, such as in 1709, 1825 and 1893.

== Sights ==
The Saint-Pierre Church, which used to be a medieval chapel, was rebuilt in 1775 and extensively restored in 1985. Various farmhouses in Franche-Comté style from the 17th to 19th centuries have been preserved in the town center.

== Population ==
Historical population
Year	Pop.	±% p.a.
1968	607	—
1975	746	+2.99%
1982	999	+4.26%
1990	1,254	+2.88%
1999	1,451	+1.63%
2007	1,778	+2.57%
2012	1,919	+1.54%
2017	1,961	+0.43%
2023	1,988	+0.23%
Source: INSEE

== Industry ==
Until well into the 20th century, Mamirolle's economic was heavily dependent on agriculture and forestry. Commercial zones have developed on the outskirts of the village since the 1970s. Various companies in the food processing, construction, micro-mechanics and electronic sectors have settled here. In the meantime, the village has also changed into a residential community.

== Twin towns – sister cities ==
Mamirolle is twinned with:

- (Czech Republic) Kostelec nad Černými lesy, Czechia

== See also ==
- Communes of the Doubs department
