= Roche-lez-Beaupré =

- Commune
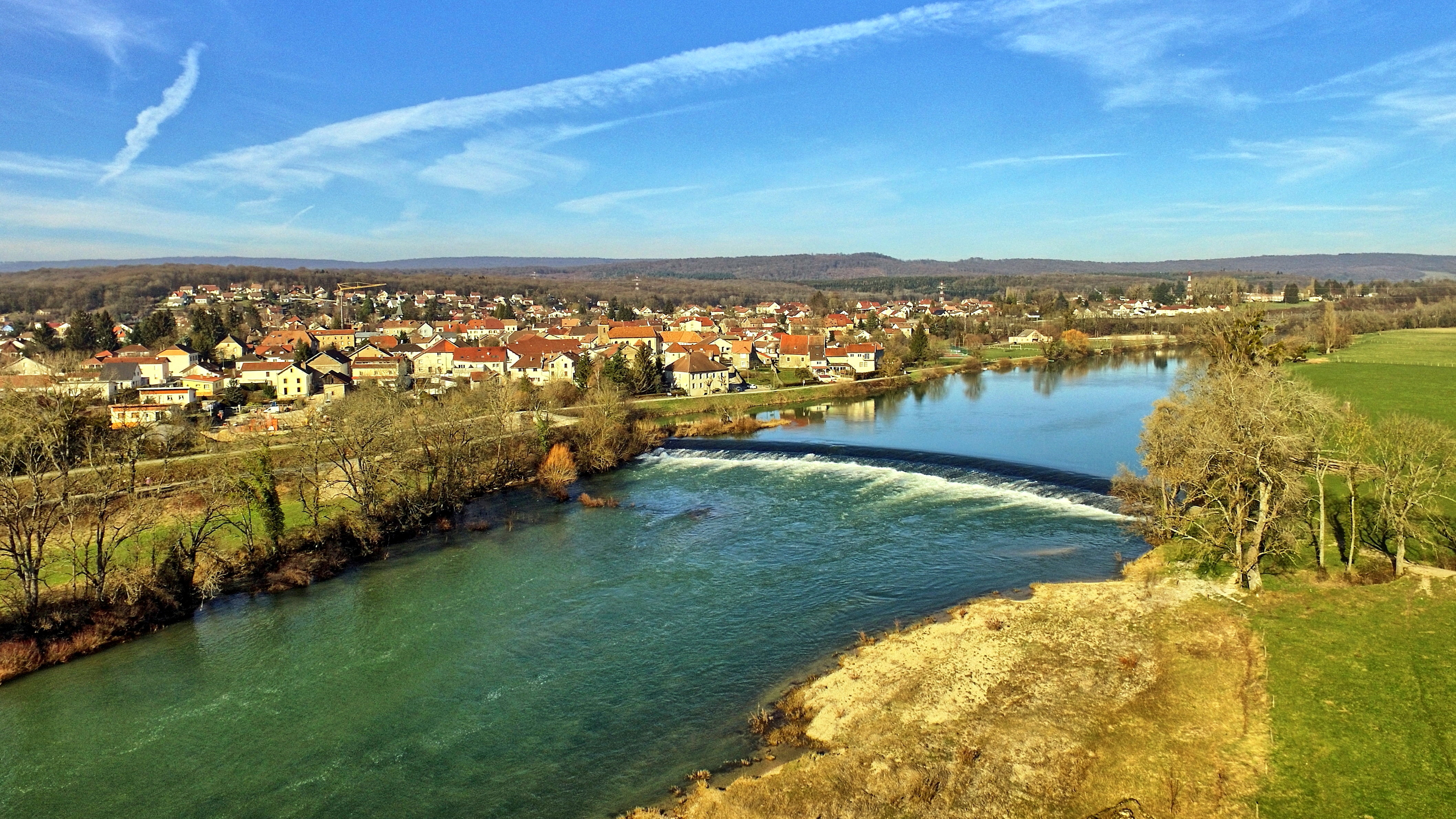
- Roche-lez-Beaupré and the weir on the Doubs river
- Location of Roche-lez-Beaupré
- Location within France Location within Bourgogne-Franche-Comté
- Coordinates: 47°16′37″N 6°06′54″E
- Country: France
- Region: Bourgogne-Franche-Comté
- Department: Doubs
- Arrondissement: Besançon
- Canton: Besançon-5
- Intercommunality: Grand Besançon Métropole

Government
  - Mayor (2020–2026): Jacques Krieger
- Area^{1}: 5.63 km^{2} (2.17 sq mi)
- Highest elevation: 339 m (1,112 ft)
- Lowest elevation: 242 m (794 ft)
- Population (2023): 2,158
  - Density: 383/km^{2} (993/sq mi)
- Time zone: UTC+01:00 (CET)
  - Summer (DST): UTC+02:00 (CEST)
- INSEE/Postal code: 25495 /25220
- ^{1} French Land Register data, which excludes lakes, ponds, glaciers > 1 km^{2} (0.386 sq mi or 247 acres) and river estuaries.

Roche-lez-Beaupré (French pronunciation: [ʁɔʃ lɛ bopʁe], before 1962: Roche) is a commune in the Doubs department in the Bourgogne-Franche-Comté region in eastern France.

== Geography ==
The commune lies 9 km (5.6 mi) northeast of Besançon on the banks of the Doubs.

== Population ==
Historical population
Year	Pop.	±% p.a.
1968	1,170	—
1975	1,372	+2.30%
1982	1,586	+2.09%
1990	1,663	+0.59%
1999	2,062	+2.42%
2007	2,070	+0.05%
2012	2,024	−0.45%
2017	2,111	+0.85%
2023	2,158	+0.37%
Source: INSEE

== Transportation ==
The commune is served by the railroad, national highway 83, and the navigable Doubs River.

== Economy ==
Industries including fertilizer and metalworking have been established in the commune.

== See also ==
- Communes of the Doubs department
