= Amagney =

- Commune
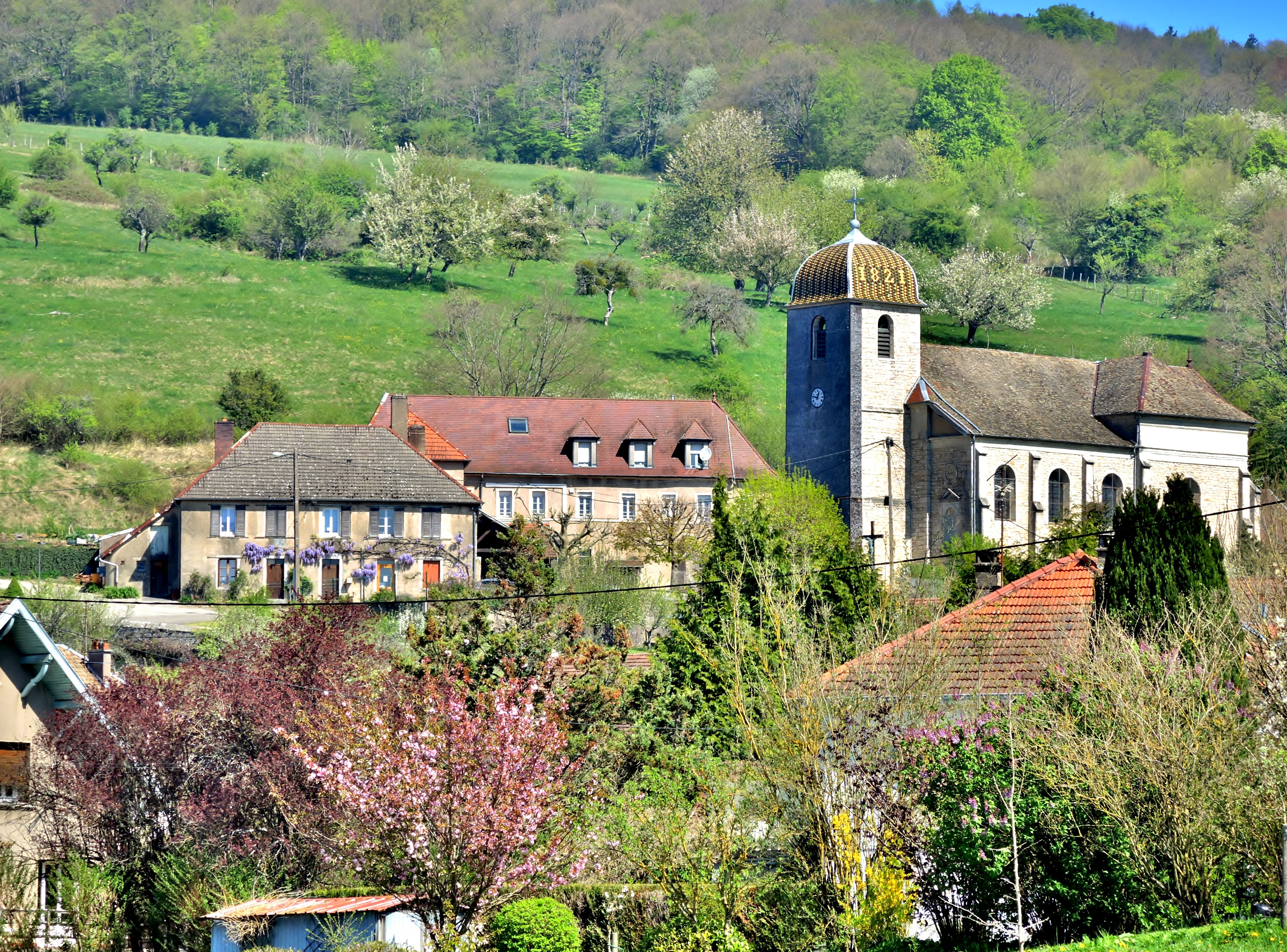
- The church in Amagney

- Coat of arms
- Location of Amagney
- Location within France Location within Bourgogne-Franche-Comté
- Coordinates: 47°18′21″N 6°09′09″E
- Country: France
- Region: Bourgogne-Franche-Comté
- Department: Doubs
- Arrondissement: Besançon
- Canton: Besançon-5
- Intercommunality: Grand Besançon Métropole

Government
  - Mayor (2020–2026): Thomas Javaux
- Area^{1}: 13.13 km^{2} (5.07 sq mi)
- Highest elevation: 504 m (1,654 ft)
- Lowest elevation: 253 m (830 ft)
- Population (2023): 934
  - Density: 71.1/km^{2} (184/sq mi)
- Time zone: UTC+01:00 (CET)
  - Summer (DST): UTC+02:00 (CEST)
- INSEE/Postal code: 25014 /25220
- ^{1} French Land Register data, which excludes lakes, ponds, glaciers > 1 km^{2} (0.386 sq mi or 247 acres) and river estuaries.

Amagney (French pronunciation: [amaɲɛ]) is a commune in the Doubs department in Bourgogne-Franche-Comté in eastern France, close to Besançon.

== Population ==
Historical population
Year	Pop.	±% p.a.
1968	422	—
1975	597	+5.08%
1982	656	+1.36%
1990	664	+0.15%
1999	680	+0.26%
2007	719	+0.70%
2012	739	+0.55%
2017	856	+2.98%
2023	934	+1.46%
Source: INSEE

== See also ==
- Communes of the Doubs department
