= Nancray =

- Commune
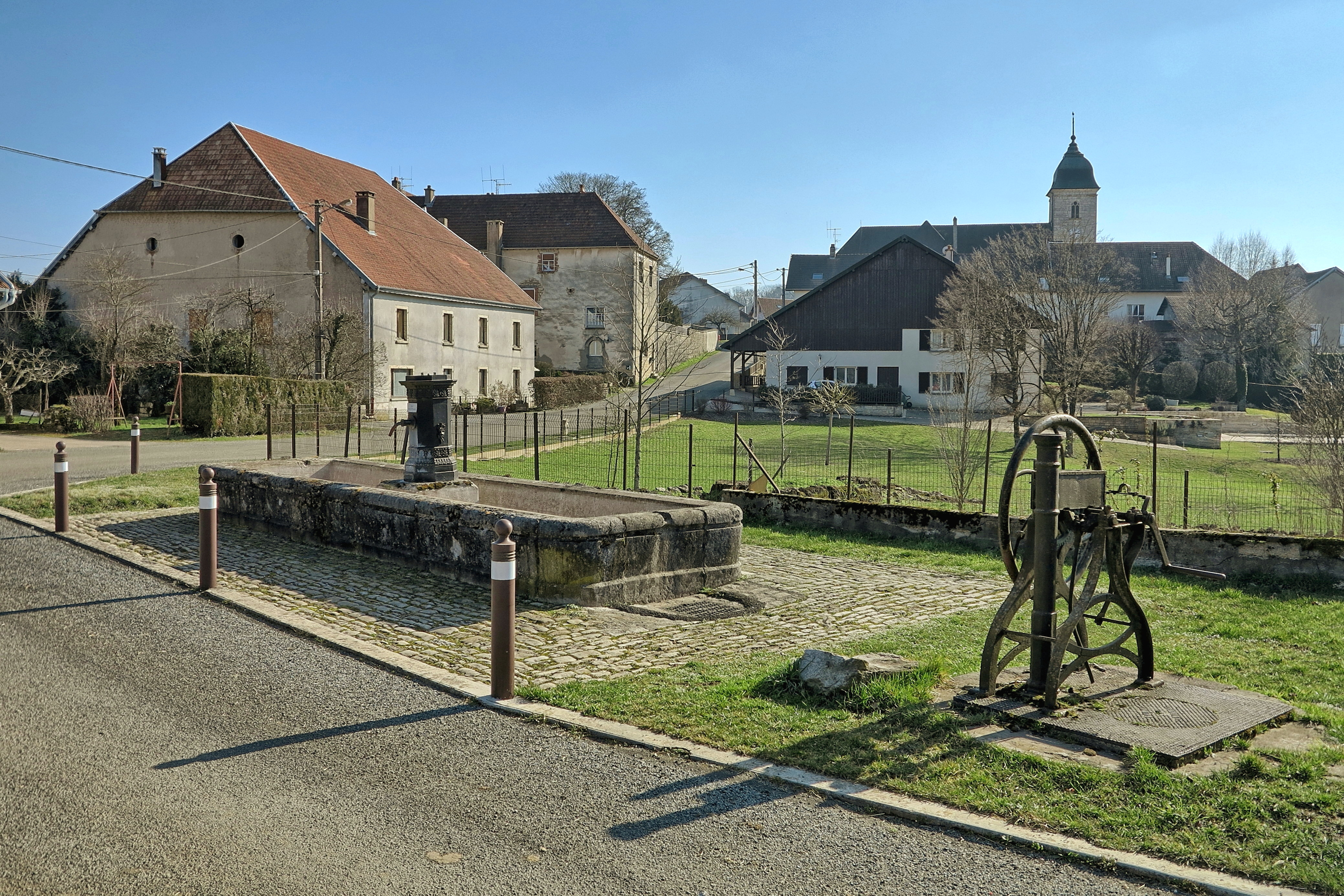
- The center the village
- Location of Nancray
- Location within France Location within Bourgogne-Franche-Comté
- Coordinates: 47°14′45″N 6°10′56″E
- Country: France
- Region: Bourgogne-Franche-Comté
- Department: Doubs
- Arrondissement: Besançon
- Canton: Besançon-5
- Intercommunality: Grand Besançon Métropole

Government
  - Mayor (2020–2026): Vincent Fiétier
- Area^{1}: 16.48 km^{2} (6.36 sq mi)
- Highest elevation: 561 m (1,841 ft)
- Lowest elevation: 395 m (1,296 ft)
- Population (2023): 1,308
  - Density: 79.37/km^{2} (205.6/sq mi)
- Time zone: UTC+01:00 (CET)
  - Summer (DST): UTC+02:00 (CEST)
- INSEE/Postal code: 25418 /25360
- ^{1} French Land Register data, which excludes lakes, ponds, glaciers > 1 km^{2} (0.386 sq mi or 247 acres) and river estuaries.

Nancray (French pronunciation: [nɑ̃kʁɛ]) is a commune in the Doubs department in the Bourgogne-Franche-Comté region in eastern France.

== Geography ==
Nancray lies 15 km (9.3 mi) south of Roulans.

== Population ==
Historical population
| Year | Pop. | ±% p.a. |
|---|---|---|
| 1968 | 504 | — |
| 1975 | 588 | +2.23% |
| 1982 | 779 | +4.10% |
| 1990 | 897 | +1.78% |
| 1999 | 1,017 | +1.40% |
| 2007 | 1,193 | +2.02% |
| 2012 | 1,268 | +1.23% |
| 2017 | 1,260 | −0.13% |
| 2023 | 1,308 | +0.63% |
Source: INSEE

== See also ==
- Communes of the Doubs department
