= La Chevillotte =

- Commune
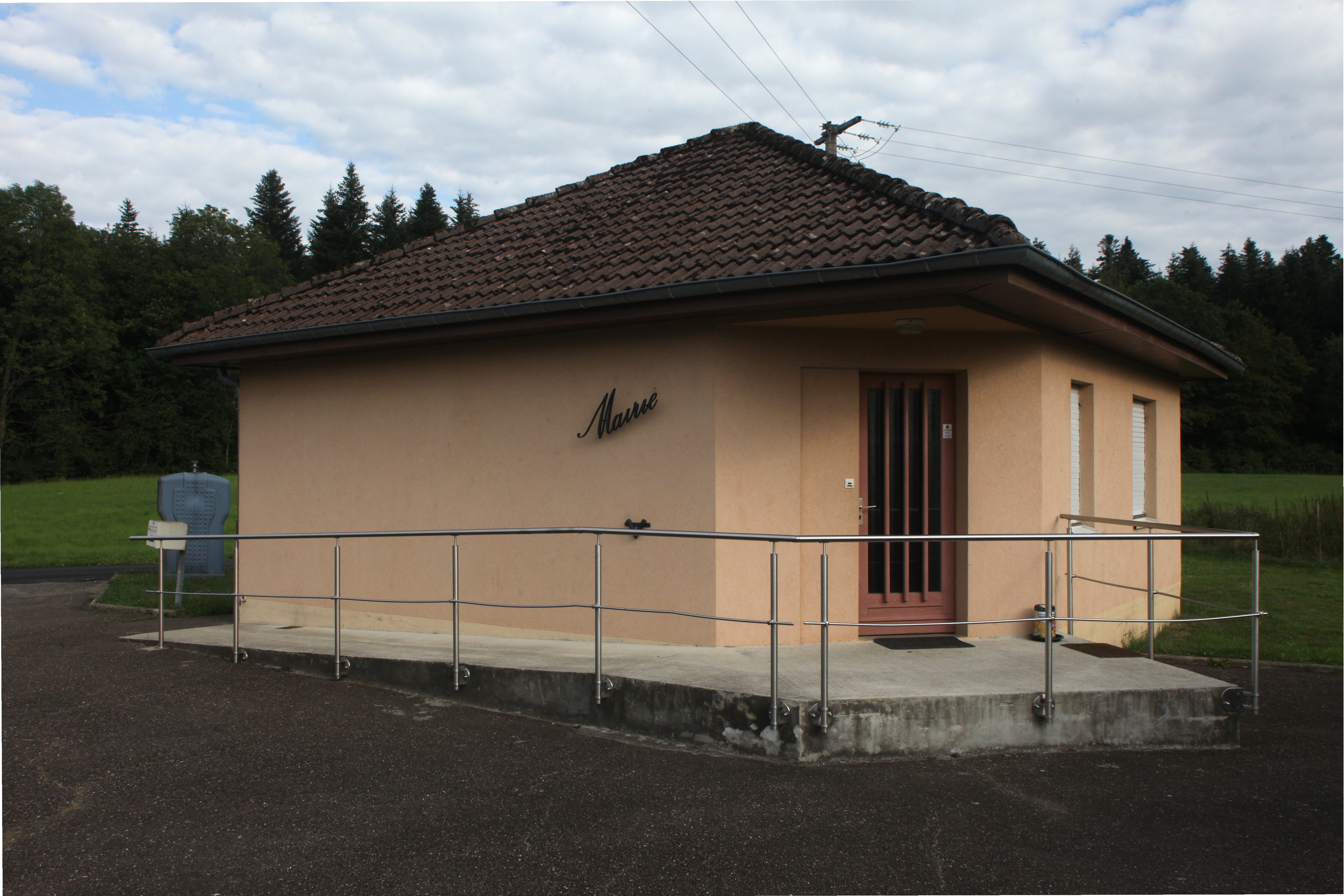
- The town hall in La Chevillotte
- Location of La Chevillotte
- Location within France Location within Bourgogne-Franche-Comté
- Coordinates: 47°13′15″N 6°10′01″E
- Country: France
- Region: Bourgogne-Franche-Comté
- Department: Doubs
- Arrondissement: Besançon
- Canton: Besançon-5
- Intercommunality: Grand Besançon Métropole

Government
  - Mayor (2022–2026): Jean-Luc Barbier
- Area^{1}: 7.68 km^{2} (2.97 sq mi)
- Highest elevation: 455 m (1,493 ft)
- Lowest elevation: 413 m (1,355 ft)
- Population (2023): 135
  - Density: 17.6/km^{2} (45.5/sq mi)
- Time zone: UTC+01:00 (CET)
  - Summer (DST): UTC+02:00 (CEST)
- INSEE/Postal code: 25152 /25620
- ^{1} French Land Register data, which excludes lakes, ponds, glaciers > 1 km^{2} (0.386 sq mi or 247 acres) and river estuaries.

La Chevillotte (French pronunciation: [la ʃəvijɔt]) is a commune in the Doubs department in the Bourgogne-Franche-Comté region in eastern France.

== Population ==
Historical population
Year	Pop.	±% p.a.
1968	53	—
1975	61	+2.03%
1982	83	+4.50%
1990	82	−0.15%
1999	76	−0.84%
2007	81	+0.80%
2012	118	+7.82%
2017	147	+4.49%
2023	135	−1.41%
Source: INSEE

== See also ==
- Communes of the Doubs department
