= Gennes, Doubs =

Gennes
- Commune
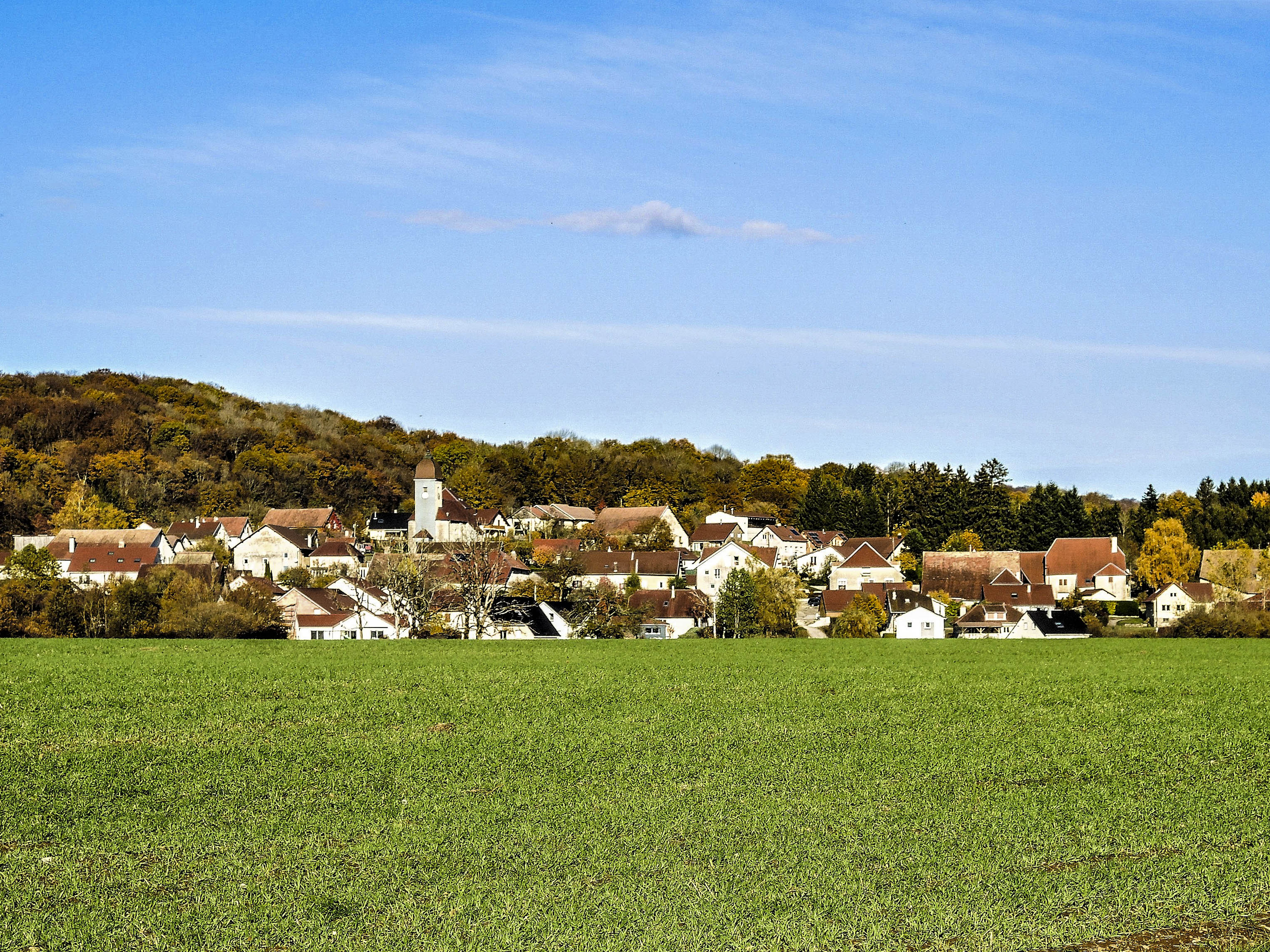
- General view
- Location of Gennes
- Location within France Location within Bourgogne-Franche-Comté
- Coordinates: 47°14′45″N 6°07′19″E
- Country: France
- Region: Bourgogne-Franche-Comté
- Department: Doubs
- Arrondissement: Besançon
- Canton: Besançon-5
- Intercommunality: Grand Besançon Métropole

Government
  - Mayor (2020–2026): Jean Simondon
- Area^{1}: 7.18 km^{2} (2.77 sq mi)
- Highest elevation: 563 m (1,847 ft)
- Lowest elevation: 383 m (1,257 ft)
- Population (2023): 669
  - Density: 93.2/km^{2} (241/sq mi)
- Time zone: UTC+01:00 (CET)
  - Summer (DST): UTC+02:00 (CEST)
- INSEE/Postal code: 25267 /25660
- ^{1} French Land Register data, which excludes lakes, ponds, glaciers > 1 km^{2} (0.386 sq mi or 247 acres) and river estuaries.

Gennes (French pronunciation: [ʒɛn]) is a commune in the Doubs department in the Bourgogne-Franche-Comté region in eastern France.

== Population ==
Historical population
Year	Pop.	±% p.a.
1968	174	—
1975	293	+7.73%
1982	375	+3.59%
1990	501	+3.69%
1999	570	+1.44%
2007	625	+1.16%
2012	612	−0.42%
2017	681	+2.16%
2023	669	−0.30%
Source: INSEE

== See also ==
- Communes of the Doubs department
