= Vaire =

- Commune
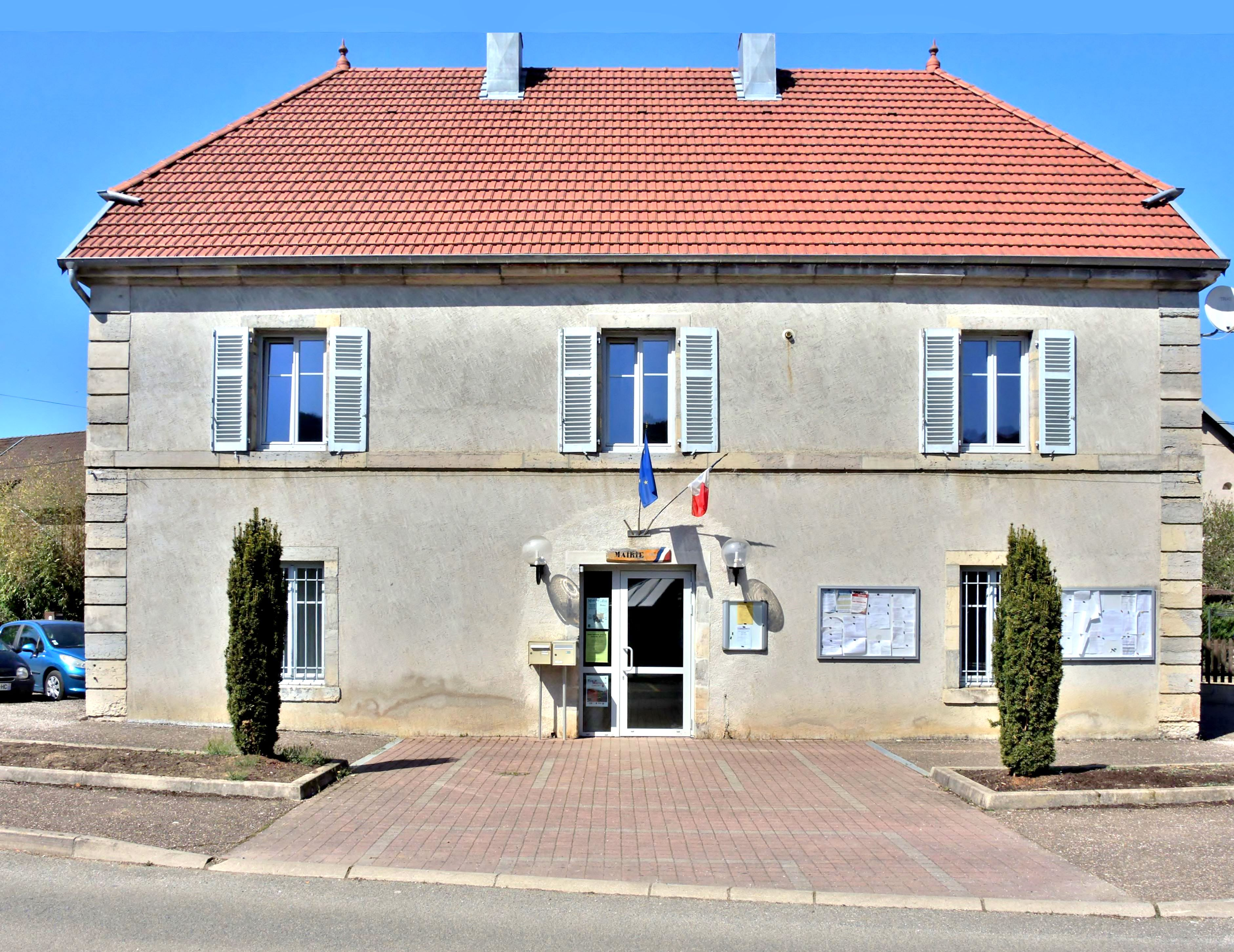
- The town hall in Vaire
- Location of Vaire
- Location within France Location within Bourgogne-Franche-Comté
- Coordinates: 47°17′02″N 6°09′11″E
- Country: France
- Region: Bourgogne-Franche-Comté
- Department: Doubs
- Arrondissement: Besançon
- Canton: Besançon-5
- Intercommunality: Grand Besançon Métropole

Government
  - Mayor (2020–2026): Valérie Maillard
- Area^{1}: 14.04 km^{2} (5.42 sq mi)
- Population (2023): 812
  - Density: 57.8/km^{2} (150/sq mi)
- Time zone: UTC+01:00 (CET)
  - Summer (DST): UTC+02:00 (CEST)
- INSEE/Postal code: 25575 /25220
- ^{1} French Land Register data, which excludes lakes, ponds, glaciers > 1 km^{2} (0.386 sq mi or 247 acres) and river estuaries.

Vaire (French pronunciation: [vɛʁ]) is a commune in the Doubs department of eastern France. The municipality was established on 1 June 2016 and consists of the former communes of Vaire-Arcier (the seat) and Vaire-le-Petit.

== See also ==
- Communes of the Doubs department
