= Saône, Doubs =

Saône
- Commune
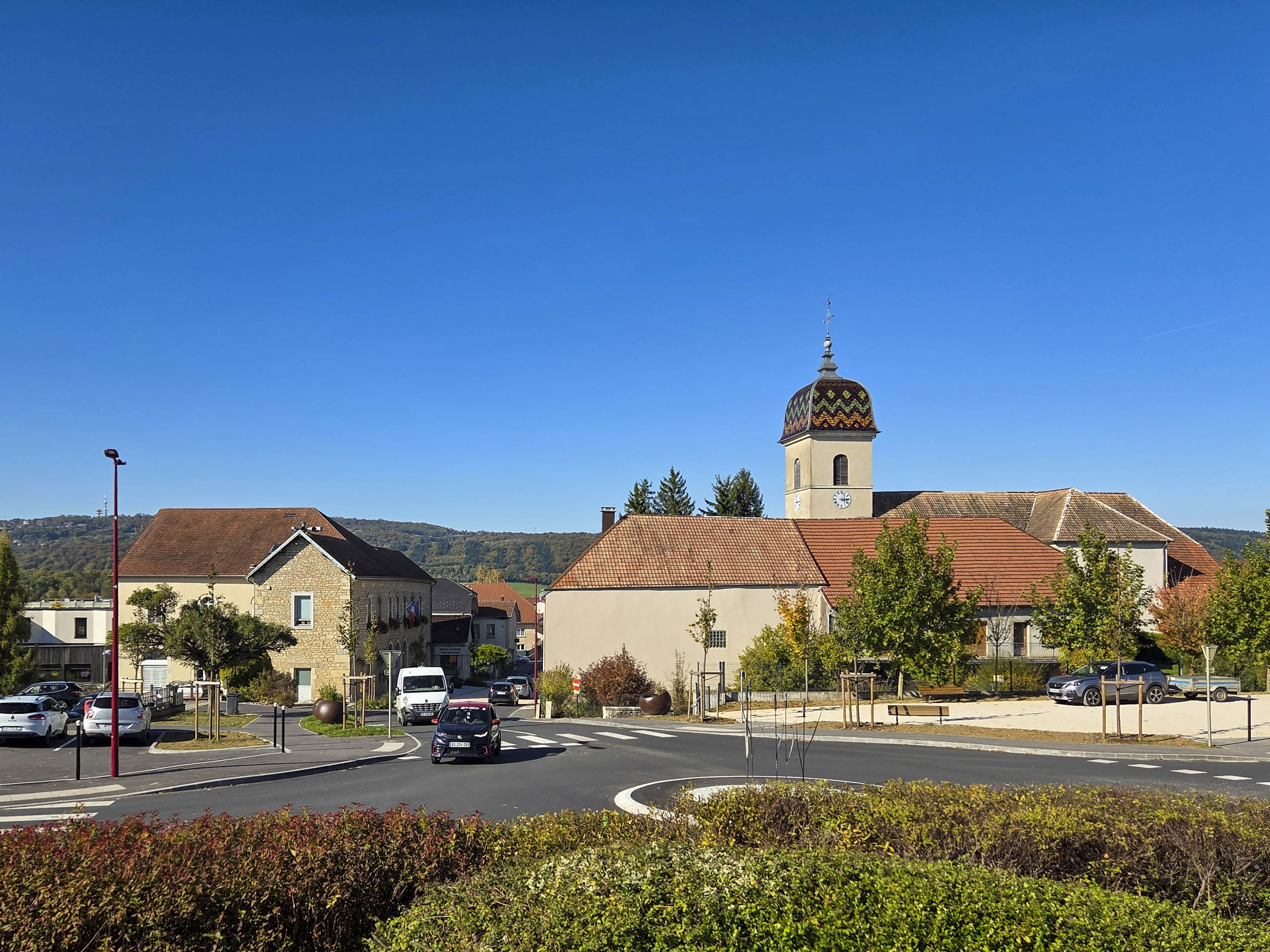
- The centre of Saône

- Coat of arms
- Location of Saône
- Location within France Location within Bourgogne-Franche-Comté
- Coordinates: 47°13′32″N 6°07′07″E
- Country: France
- Region: Bourgogne-Franche-Comté
- Department: Doubs
- Arrondissement: Besançon
- Canton: Besançon-5
- Intercommunality: Grand Besançon Métropole

Government
  - Mayor (2020–2026): Benoit Vuillemin
- Area^{1}: 20.55 km^{2} (7.93 sq mi)
- Highest elevation: 495 m (1,624 ft)
- Lowest elevation: 370 m (1,210 ft)
- Population (2023): 3,195
  - Density: 155.5/km^{2} (402.7/sq mi)
- Time zone: UTC+01:00 (CET)
  - Summer (DST): UTC+02:00 (CEST)
- INSEE/Postal code: 25532 /25660
- ^{1} French Land Register data, which excludes lakes, ponds, glaciers > 1 km^{2} (0.386 sq mi or 247 acres) and river estuaries.

Saône (French pronunciation: [son]) is a commune in the Doubs department in the Bourgogne-Franche-Comté region in eastern France.

== Geography ==
The commune lies 10 km (6.2 mi) south of Besançon.

== Population ==
Historical population
| Year | Pop. | ±% p.a. |
|---|---|---|
| 1968 | 1,341 | — |
| 1975 | 1,943 | +5.44% |
| 1982 | 2,200 | +1.79% |
| 1990 | 2,412 | +1.16% |
| 1999 | 2,728 | +1.38% |
| 2007 | 3,154 | +1.83% |
| 2012 | 3,301 | +0.92% |
| 2017 | 3,375 | +0.44% |
| 2023 | 3,195 | −0.91% |
Source: INSEE

== See also ==
- Communes of the Doubs department
