= French ship Saône =

Five ships of the French Navy have borne the name Saône, after the river Saône :

- French ship Saône (1798), was a dahabeah used on the Nile during the French campaign in Egypt and Syria.
- French corvette Saône was a corvette launched in 1826 and was renamed Agathe one year later.
- French ship Saône (1855), was a steam warship launched in 1855
- French aviso Saône was an aviso launched in 1880
- French tanker Saône, is a fleet tanker launched in 1963
