= Canton of Besançon-5 =

Canton of France

Coordinates: 47.235°N 6.025°E

The canton of Besançon-5 is an administrative division of the Doubs department, eastern France. It was created at the French canton reorganisation which came into effect in March 2015. Its seat is in Besançon.

It consists of the following communes:

1. Amagney
2. Besançon (partly)
3. La Chevillotte
4. Deluz
5. Fontain
6. Gennes
7. Mamirolle
8. Montfaucon
9. Morre
10. Nancray
11. Novillars
12. Roche-lez-Beaupré
13. Saône
14. Vaire
15. La Vèze
16. Centre-Chapelle des Buis
