= Trépillots =

Coordinates: 47.2332°N 5.98257°E

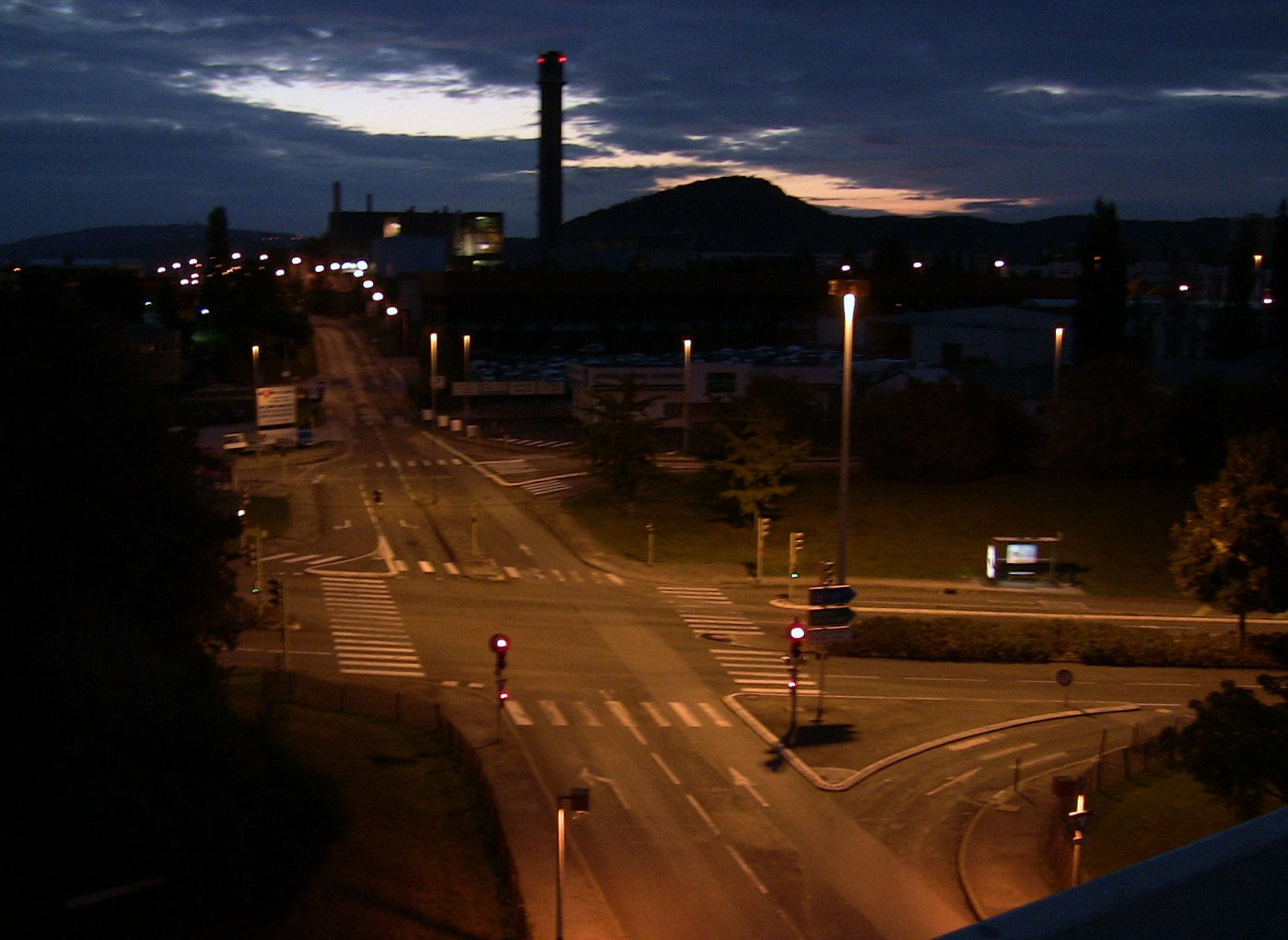
View of the main street of the area, by night

Trépillots is an industrial park located in Besançon, Doubs, France.

== History ==
Trépillots is the name of three related industrial parks: Tilleroyes, Châteaufarine and Trépillots. Formerly, the industrial park of Châteaufarine was called "Planoise Industrial Park" and was an extension of the area containing the neighborhood businesses. Today, the sector is a part of the Tilleroyes, and is located at the south of the area. A lot of businesses reside in Trépillots, as well as the municipality's slaughterhouse and waste disposal.

== See also ==
- Planoise
- Industrial park
- Besançon
