= Foire comtoise =

Coordinates: 47.225°N 5.98°E

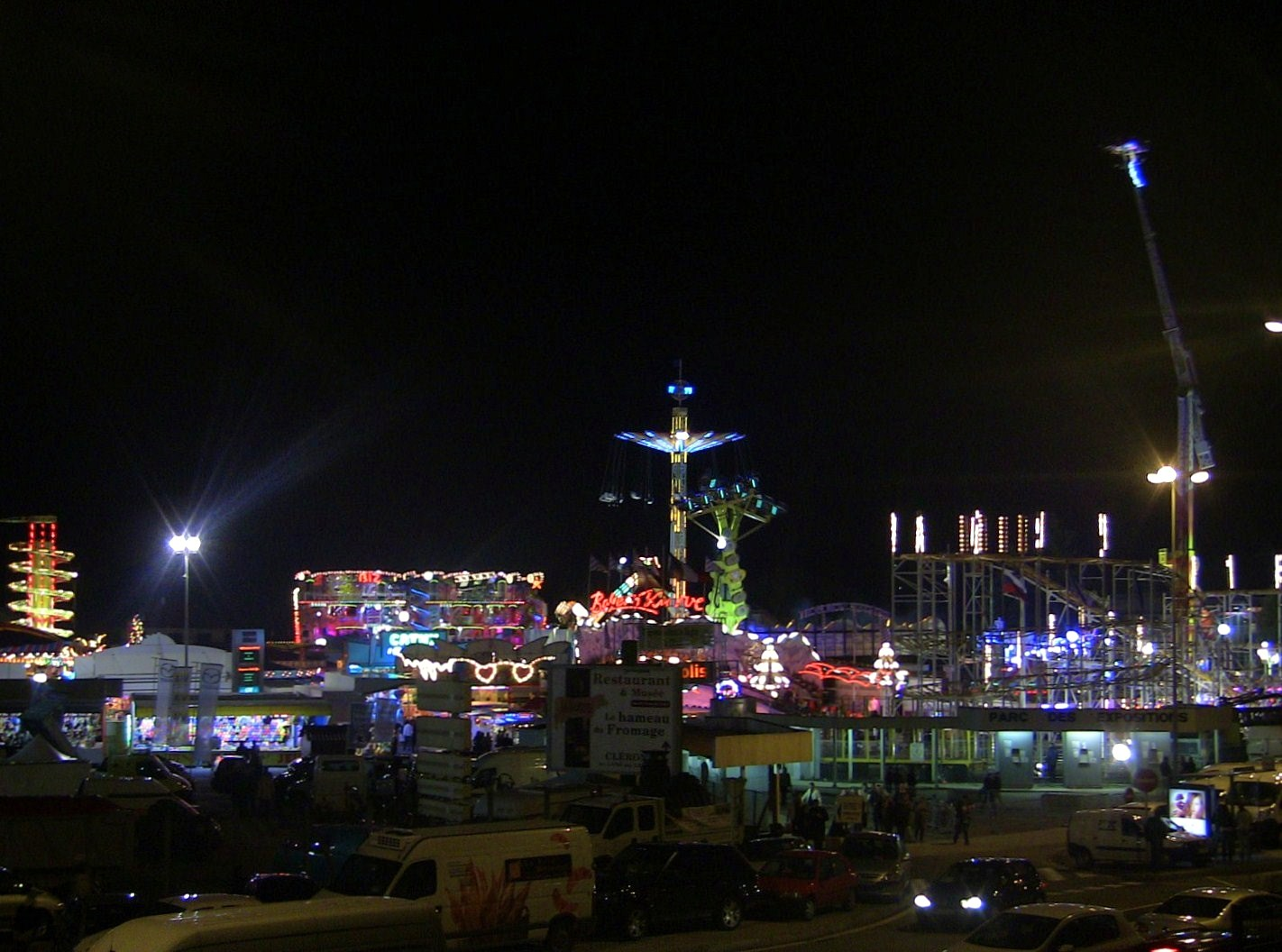
The funfair of Besançon by night.

The Funfair of Besançon is a festive event who takes place every year in the Micropolis in the district of Planoise.

== History ==
This event is the most festive gathering of Franche-Comté, and met every year more than 140,000 visitors and more than 450 exhibitors, and exist since 1936. In 2010, 20,000 visitors where attracted at the opening day.

The Foire comtoise was cancelled in 2020, due to the Covid-19 pandemic. There was a record attendance of 157,691 in 2023.

== See also ==
- Planoise
- Besançon
