= Décibels radio =

Besançon-Planoise; France
- Broadcast area: France
- Frequency: 92

Programming
- Format: FM

Ownership
- Owner: Radio France

Décibels radio (French: radio Décibels) was a French local radio station stream in the city of Besançon (Doubs, Franche-Comté).

== History ==
Décibels radio was created in the 1980s by Jean-françois Chignard, in Besançon. It was located on Cologne street, in the area of Planoise. For a long time the station played popular songs, but in the 2000s, they also played house music and techno. Décibels radio lost its frequency in 2006 and disappeared in 2008. It was replaced by FG DJ Radio.

== See also ==
- South radio
- France Bleu
