= La Passerelle (newspaper) =

French newspaper

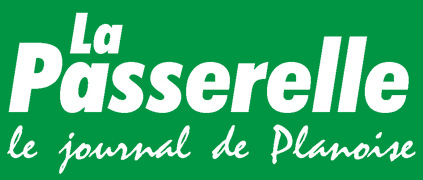
- Type: Quarterly newspaper
- Owner(s): La Passrelle foundation
- Editor: Joelle Cailleaux
- Founded: 1985
- Political alignment: No one
- Language: French language
- Headquarters: Planoise
- Country: France
- ISSN: 0980-3203
- Website: lapasserelleplanoise.free.fr

La Passerelle (French) or the Gateway (English) is a local newspaper distributed in the area of Planoise, in the city of Besançon (Doubs, Franche-Comté, France).

== History ==
At the end of the 1970s, a free newspaper appeared in the area of Planoise (at this time it was a new neighborhood) called ZIP, ZAC, ZUP, in reference to the administrative term used about Planoise (ZUP means New Urbanised Zone in English). After the disappearance of this newspaper in the beginning of the 1980s, la Passerelle was created in 1985, the name being a reference to the red gateway which crosses the area between Epoisses and Cassin sector. The principal financing of la Passerelle is donations of the inhabitants of Planoise and the advertisements of the traders at the end of the newspaper. Since 2008 the siege of la Passerelle is located in Île-de-France sector, in Nelson-Mandela building. the newspaper also has a French website .

== Characteristics ==
La Passerelle recounts essential stories about the local life of the area, the testimony of inhabitants and the main events in Planoise and in the city of Besançon. The coverage of the newspaper is composed by two green bands in the extremities of the newspaper, with an image in the center. The newspaper contains around 20 pages and is distributed four times a year (once every three months). All photos are in black and white, and la Passerelle is totally written by volunteers. Its slogan is: "the newspaper of Planoise".

== See also ==
- Le Figaro
- List of newspapers in France
