= Micropolis, Besançon =

Coordinates: 47.2252°N 5.97995°E

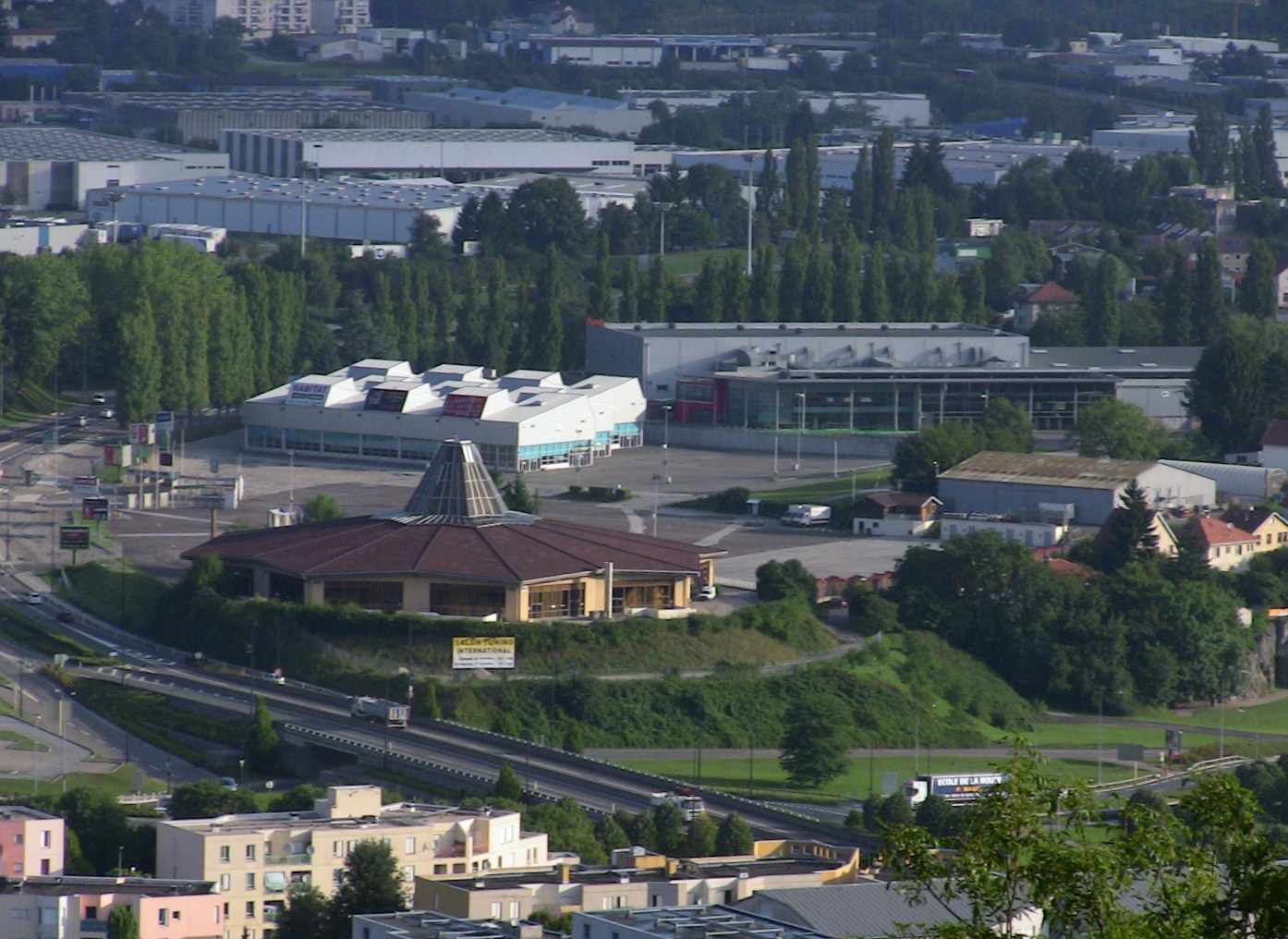
View of the sector from the hill of Planoise

Micropolis (French pronunciation: [mikʁopɔlis]) is a sector of the area of Planoise, in the city of Besançon, Doubs, Franche-Comté, France.

== History ==
Before the construction of the halls, the Roy farm was located in this site. This building was a farm, then a Christian church, and finally integrated into the concert building in 1988. Many major events of the city take place in Micropolis : the foire comtoise, the big amusement park of the region, Micronora the biggest European microtechnology salon, and the concerts of the city. In 2007, the French president Nicolas Sarkozy chose Micropolis for his electoral meeting.

== See also ==
- Funfair of Besançon
- Planoise
- Besançon
