= Fort of Planoise =

Fort in Besancon, France

Coordinates: 47.2076°N 5.98163°E

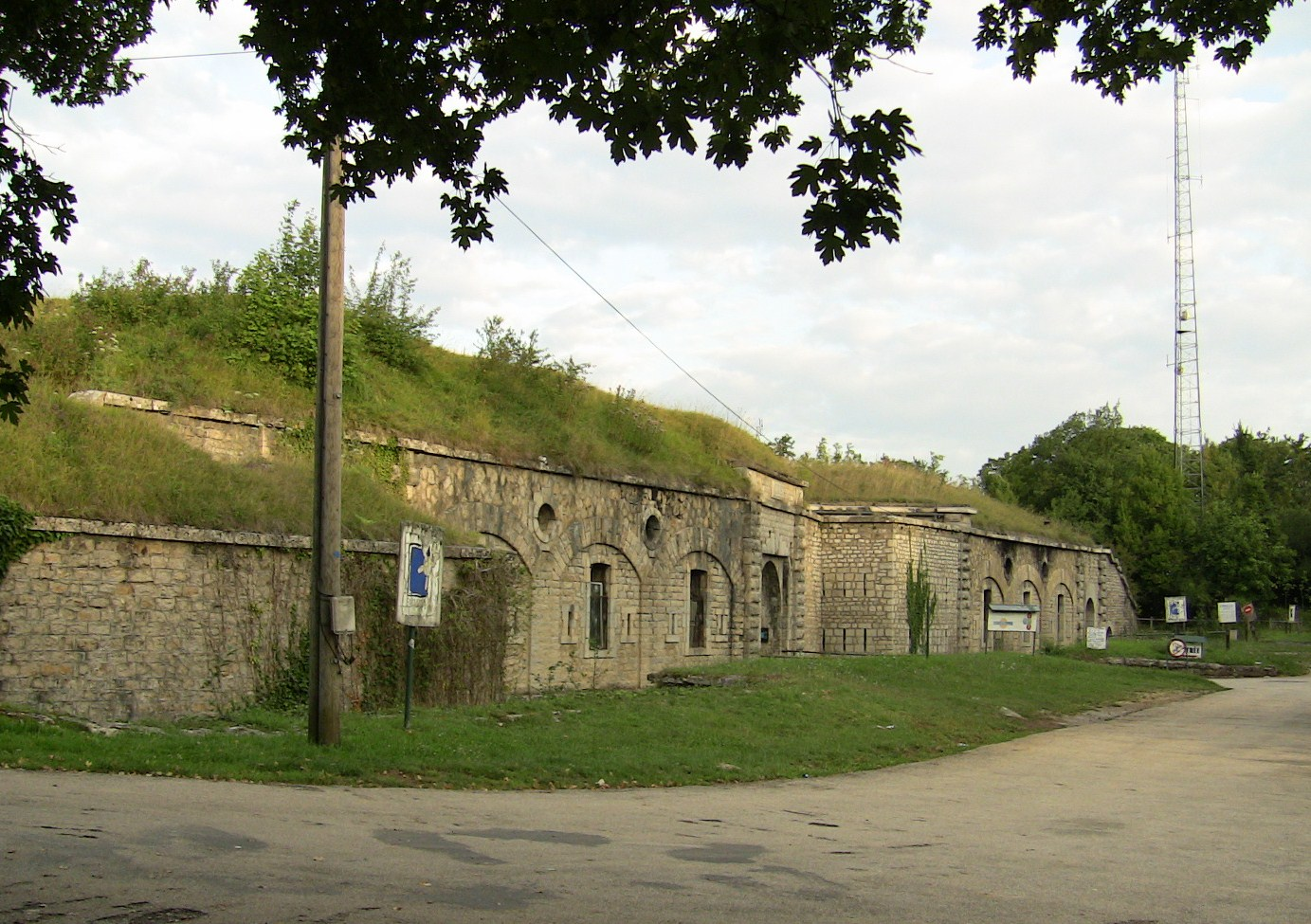
- General view of the fort
- Interactive map of the Fort of Planoise area

General information
- Location: Besançon-Planoise, France
- Construction started: 1877–1882
- Client: City of Besançon
- Owner: City of Besançon

Technical details
- Size: 4

The fort of Planoise is a fortification located on the summit of the hill of Planoise, in Besançon (Franche-Comté, France). Although its location was extremely strategic, the fort was not used during either the first or the second World War.

== History ==
The monument was built in 1877 to 1882, on the summit of the hill of Planoise (at 490m), to defend the city of Besançon. In the 1930s the fort was abandoned, and in 1949 Emmaus homeless charity rented the Planoise fort for offices.

== Gallery ==
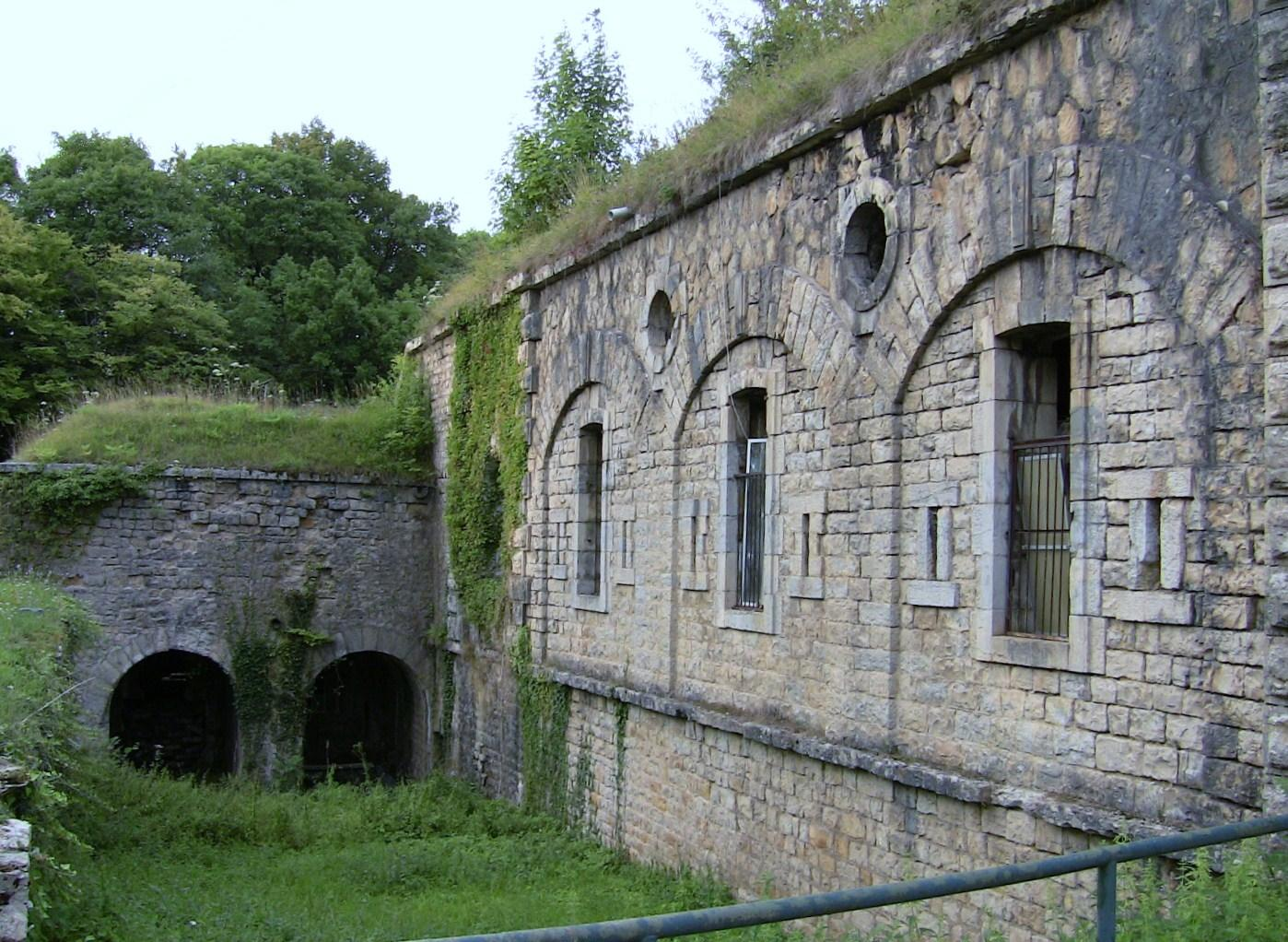
A piece of the monument

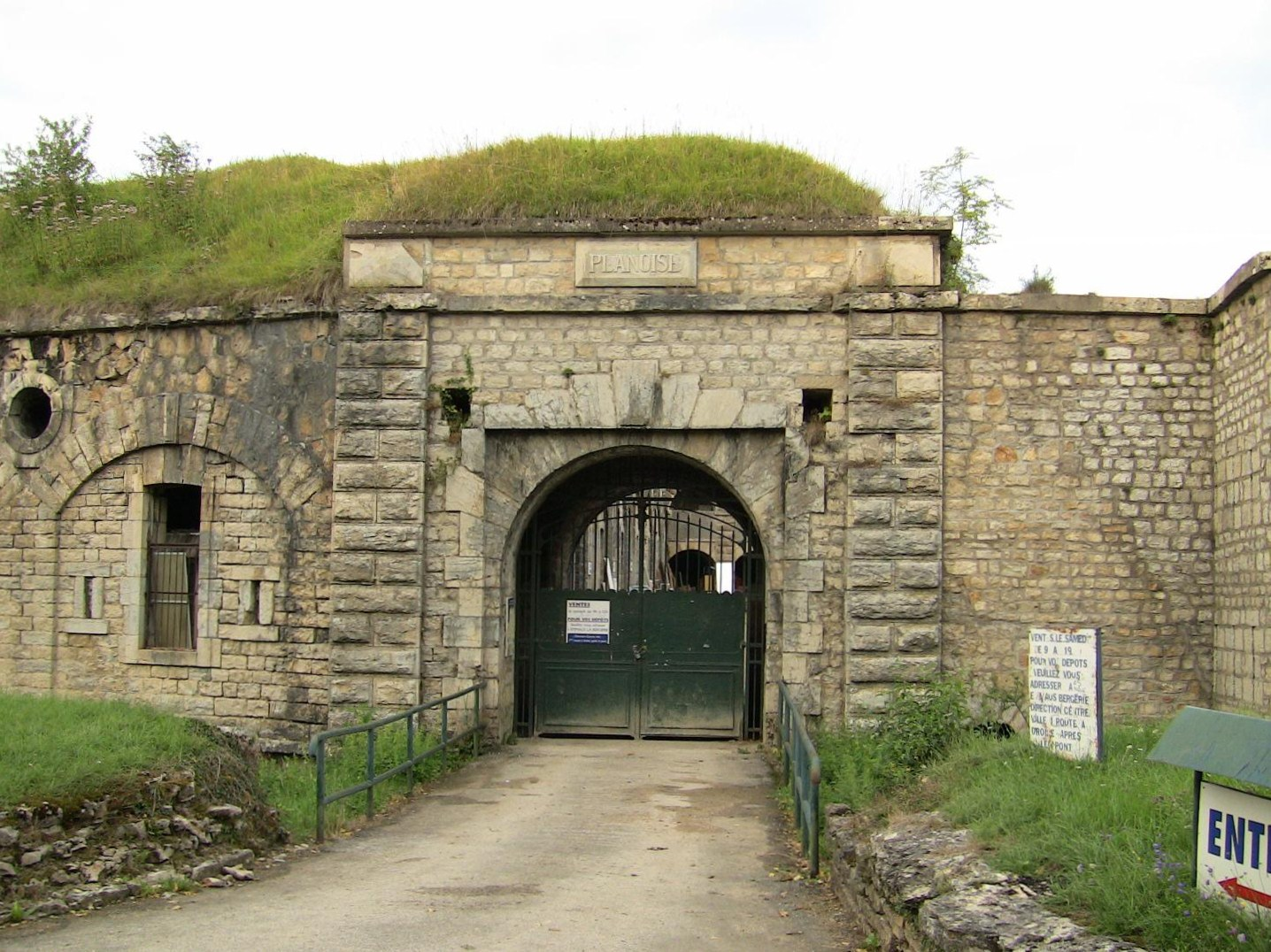
Principal entry of the fort

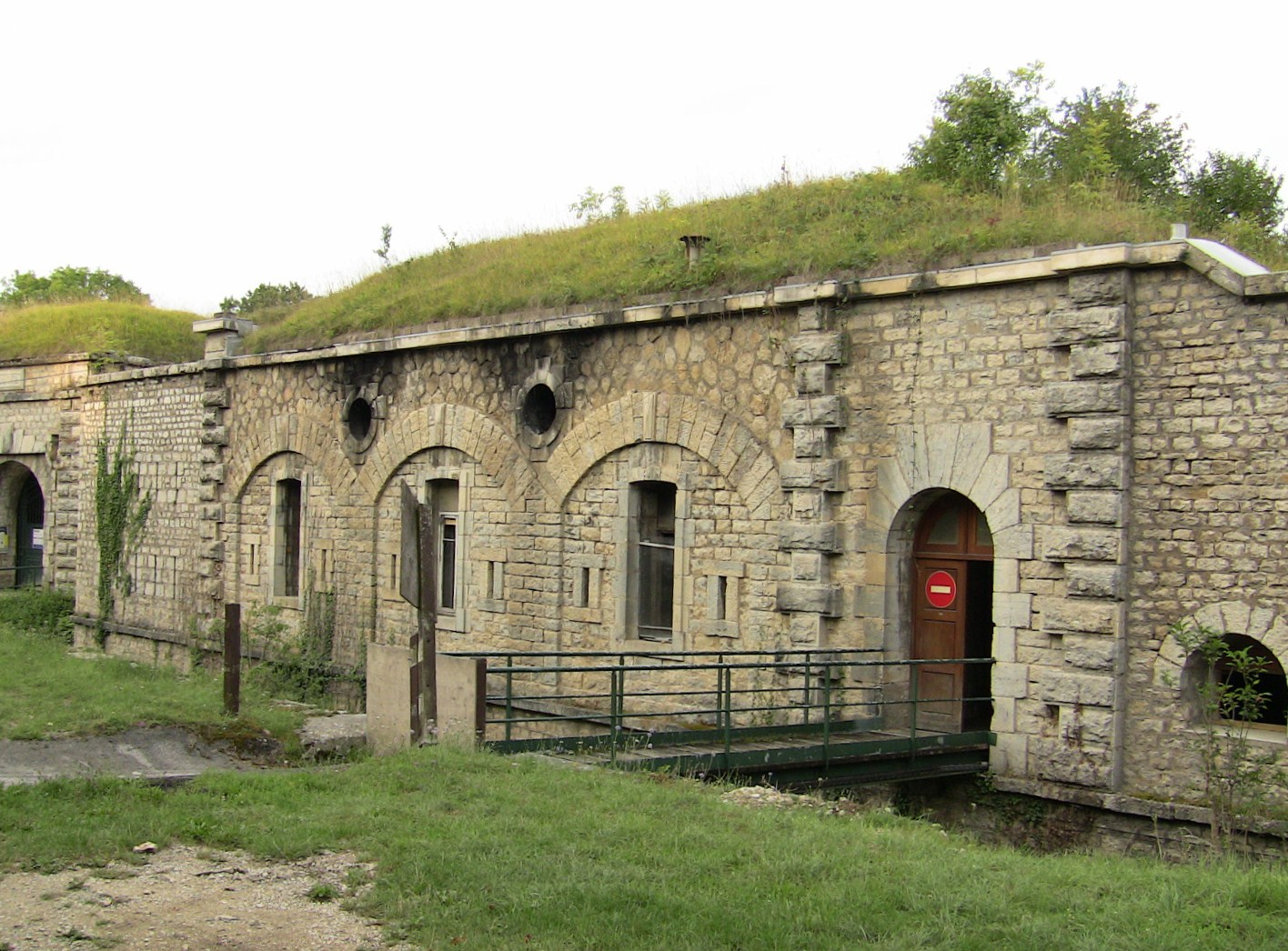
Secondary entry

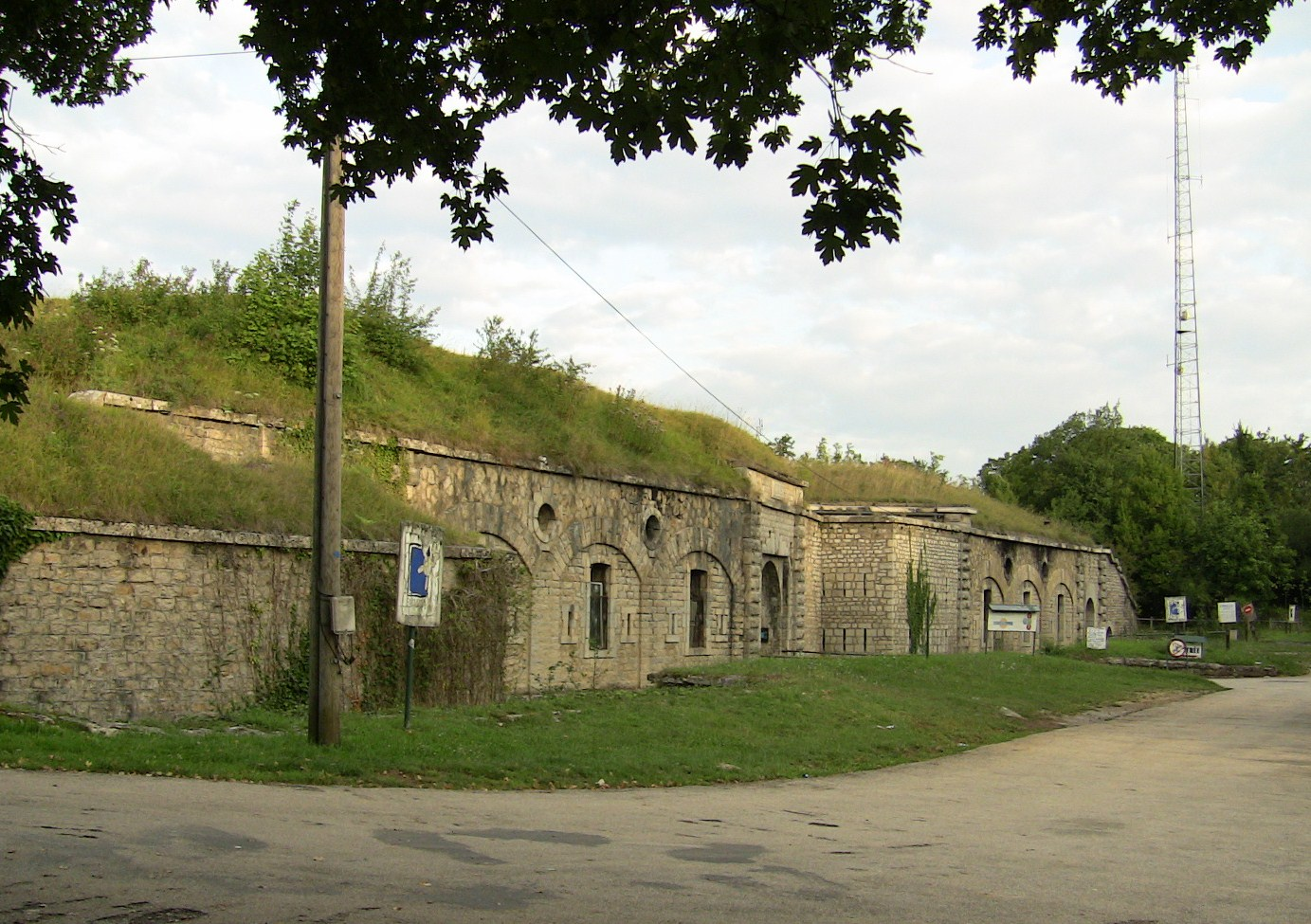
General view of the monument

== See also ==
- Fort
