= Les Hauts-de-Chazal =

Coordinates: 5°57′25″N 47°13′23″E

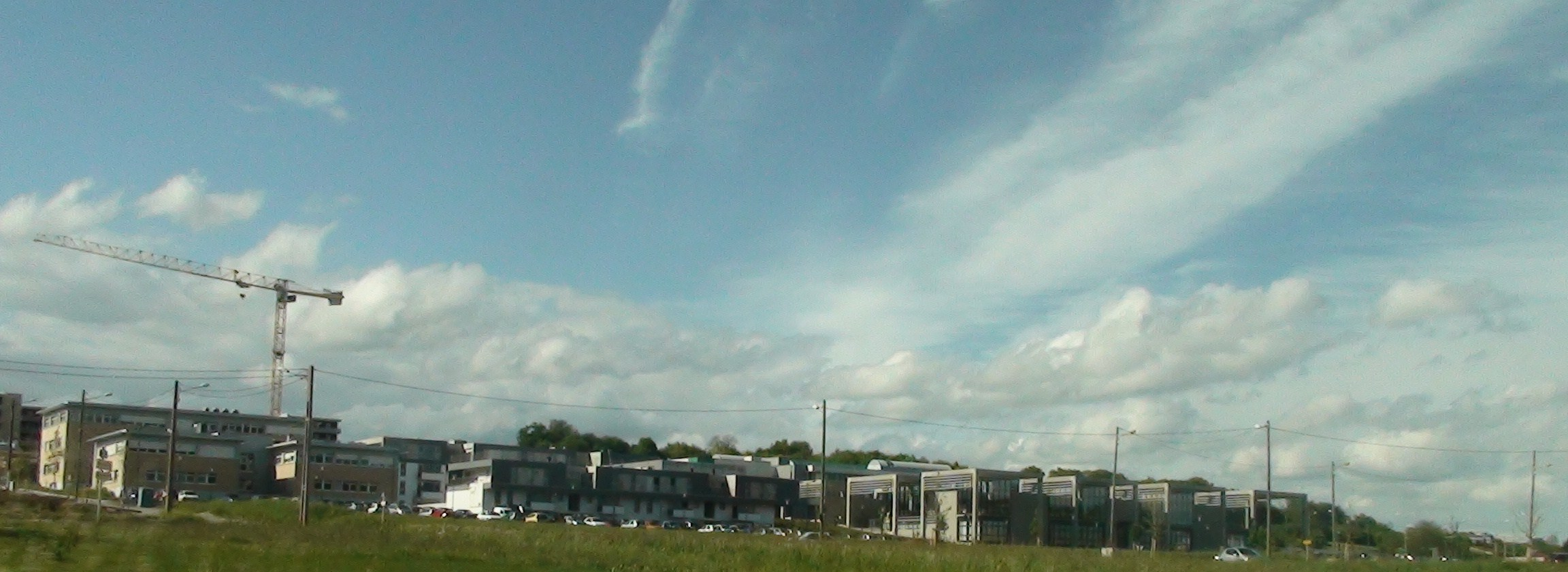
Hauts-de-Chazal, in 2009

Hauts-de-Chazal is a new sector of the area of Planoise, located in the west of Besançon (Doubs, Franche-Comté, France).

== History ==
Hauts-de-Chazal is a sector of Planoise, located in the French city of Besançon. The area was built in 2007 and will receive the new hospital pole of the city, a library, and a medicine faculty. The area is located near Planoise and a residential will be built.

== Gallery ==
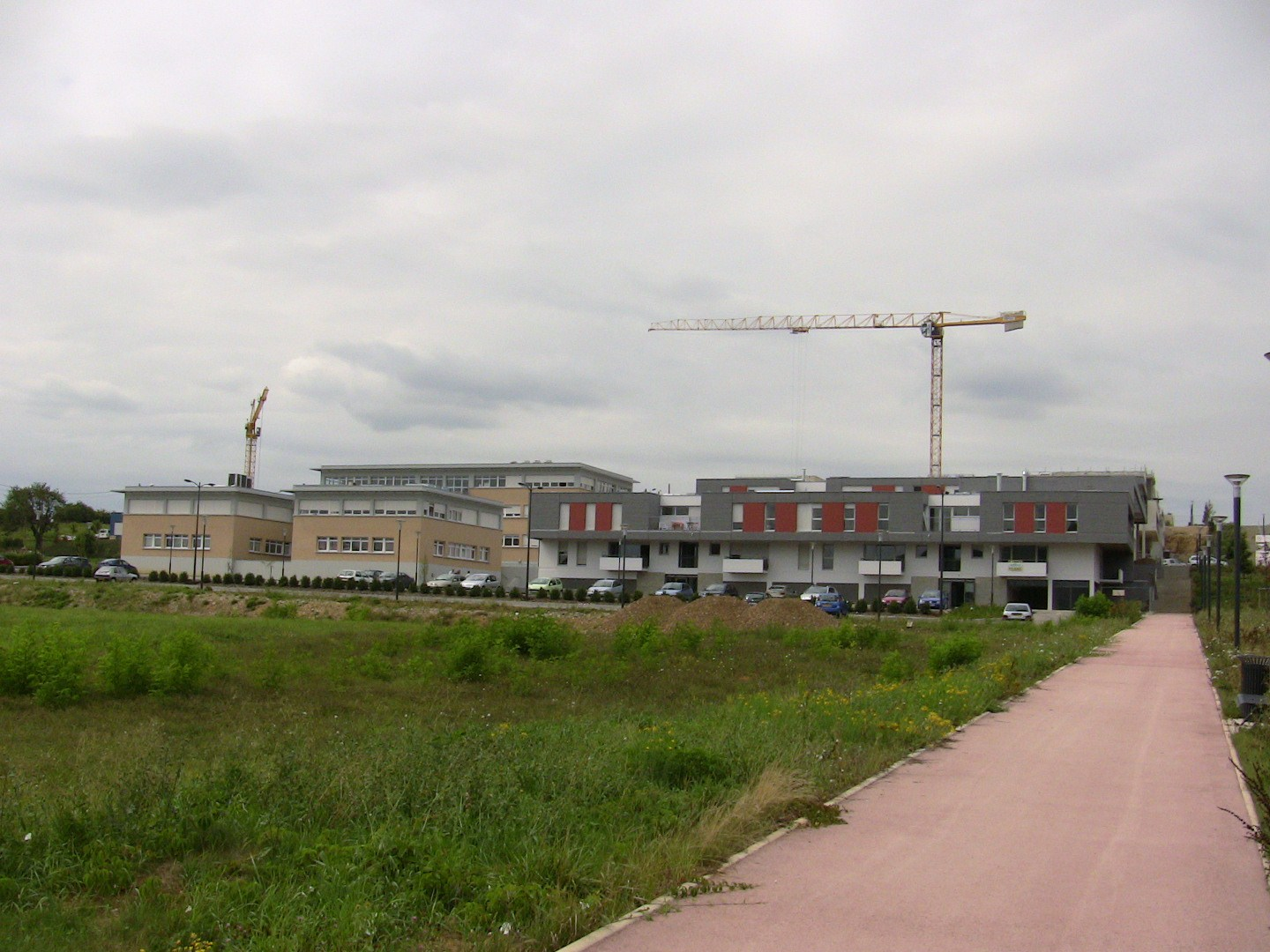
Buildings in construction

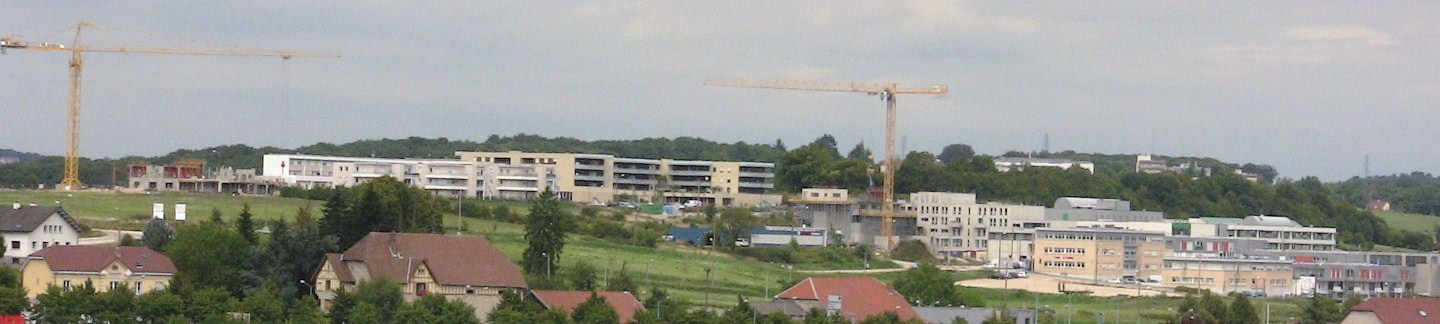
General view of the sector

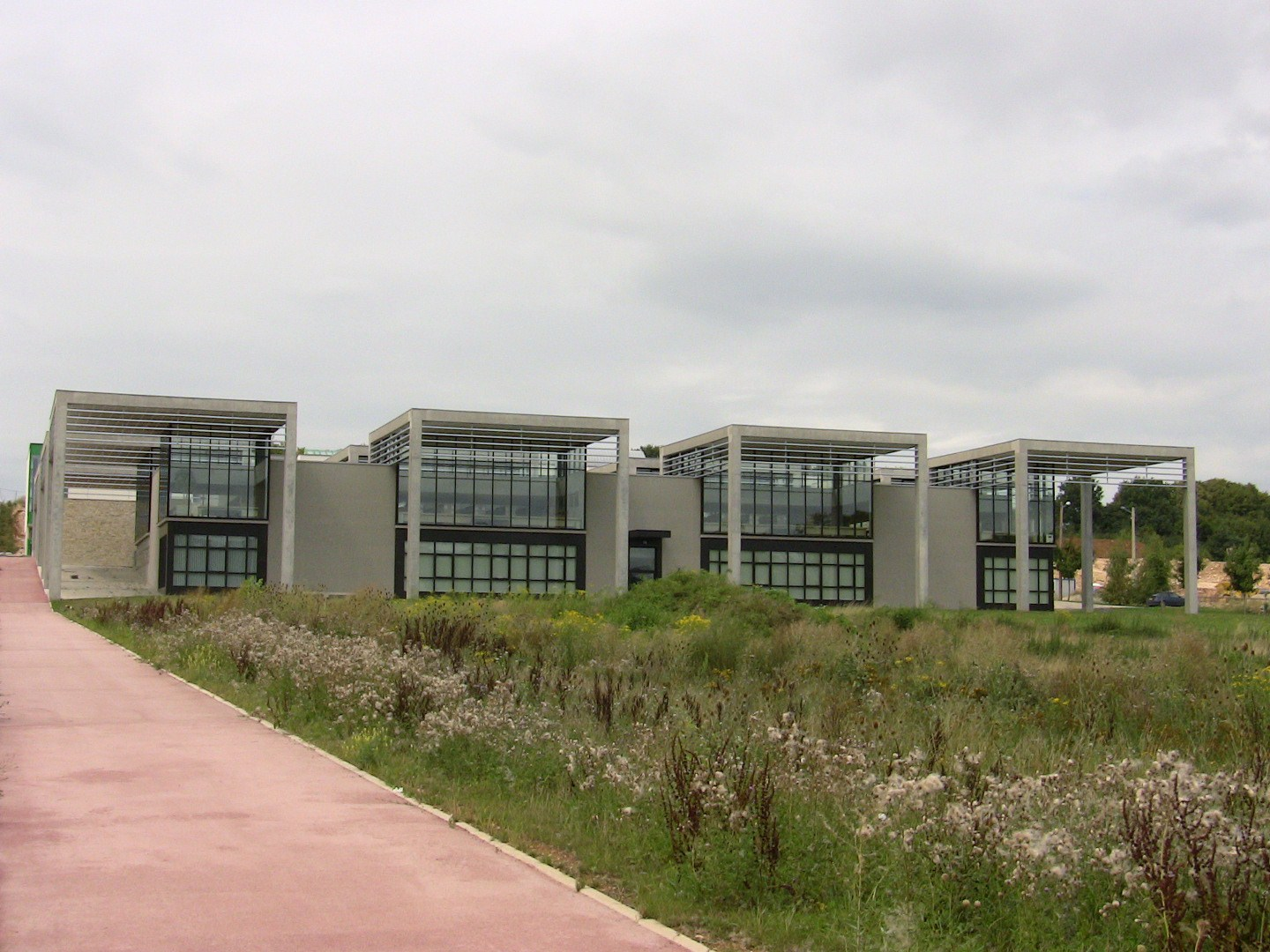
Other news buildings

== See also ==
- Planoise
- Besançon
