= Departmental archives of Doubs =

Building in Besançon-Planoise, France

- General view of the building
- Interactive map of the Departmental archives of Doubs area

General information
- Location: Besançon-Planoise, France
- Coordinates: 47.2294°N 6.0346°E
- Construction started: 1980s
- Client: Department of Doubs
- Owner: Department of Doubs

The Departmental archives of Doubs (French: Archives départementales du Doubs) is a French administrative building dependent of the general council of Doubs, charged with collecting records and archives, keeping them and making them available for the public. The Departmental archives of Doubs is located in the area of Planoise, in Besançon (Doubs, Franche-Comté).

== History ==
The first archives of the department was kept from 1796 in the old stewardship of the town center of Besançon. In 1986, the general council decided to move the archives administration in the area of Planoise into a new building, celebrated for its great blue windows. It is located in the sector of Cassin, at March Bloch Street. The archives is composed of 20.8 kilometers of public linear archives, one kilometer of private linear archives and a library containing 25,000 books.

== See also ==
- Planoise
- Government of France
