= South radio =

South radio (radio sud)

Besançon-Planoise; France
- Broadcast area: France
- Frequency: 101.8

Programming
- Format: FM

Ownership
- Owner: Radio France

Links
- Website: Sensationrock.com

South radio (French : Radio sud) is a French local radio station stream in the agglomération of Besançon (Doubs, Franche-Comté).

== History ==
South radio was created in 1982 in the French city of Besançon for the Algerian community. Hamid Hakkar wanted to establish a radio station in the area of Chaprais because no one administrative and cultural equipment existed in the neighborhood. The first broadcast was on 3 January 1983 and the radio was recognized officially by the Conseil supérieur de l'audiovisuel in 1985. After its success, the local being too small, the radio moved to Saint-Claude area in 1995 then in Planoise as far as today.

== See also ==
- France Bleu
- Planoise
