= Châteaufarine =

Human settlement in France

Coordinates: 47.216828°N 5.949311°E

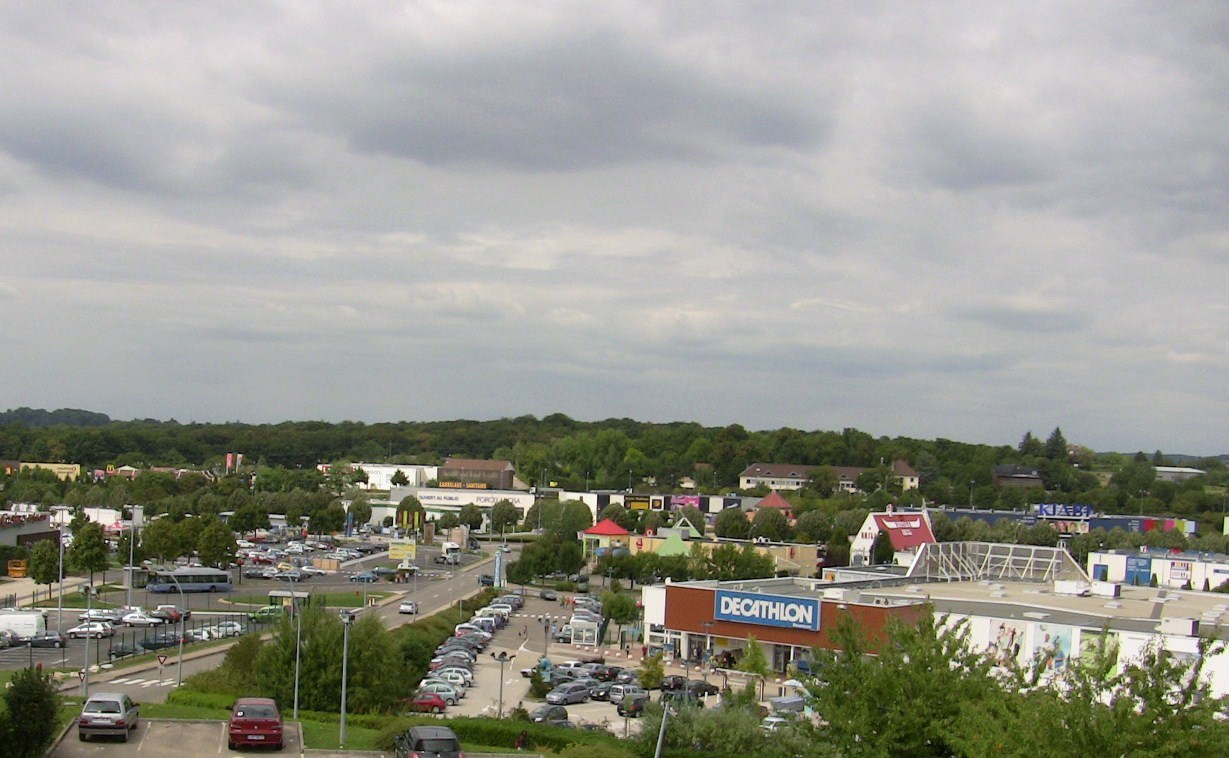
Châteaufarine during rainy day

Châteaufarine (French pronunciation: [ʃatofaʁin]) is a newly developed area of Besançon located in the west of the city. It is a famous commercial center, the biggest of Franche-Comté, and a part of Planoise, France. It is also well known for its agricultural college.

== History ==
In 1971, "Châteaufarine" was a name of a hamlet, located in the present area of Planoise. This toponym was the name of a farm built by a baker for his children. In 1990, construction began for the first commercial centre in the region.

== See also ==
- Planoise
- Besançon
