= Planoise =

- Part of Besançon
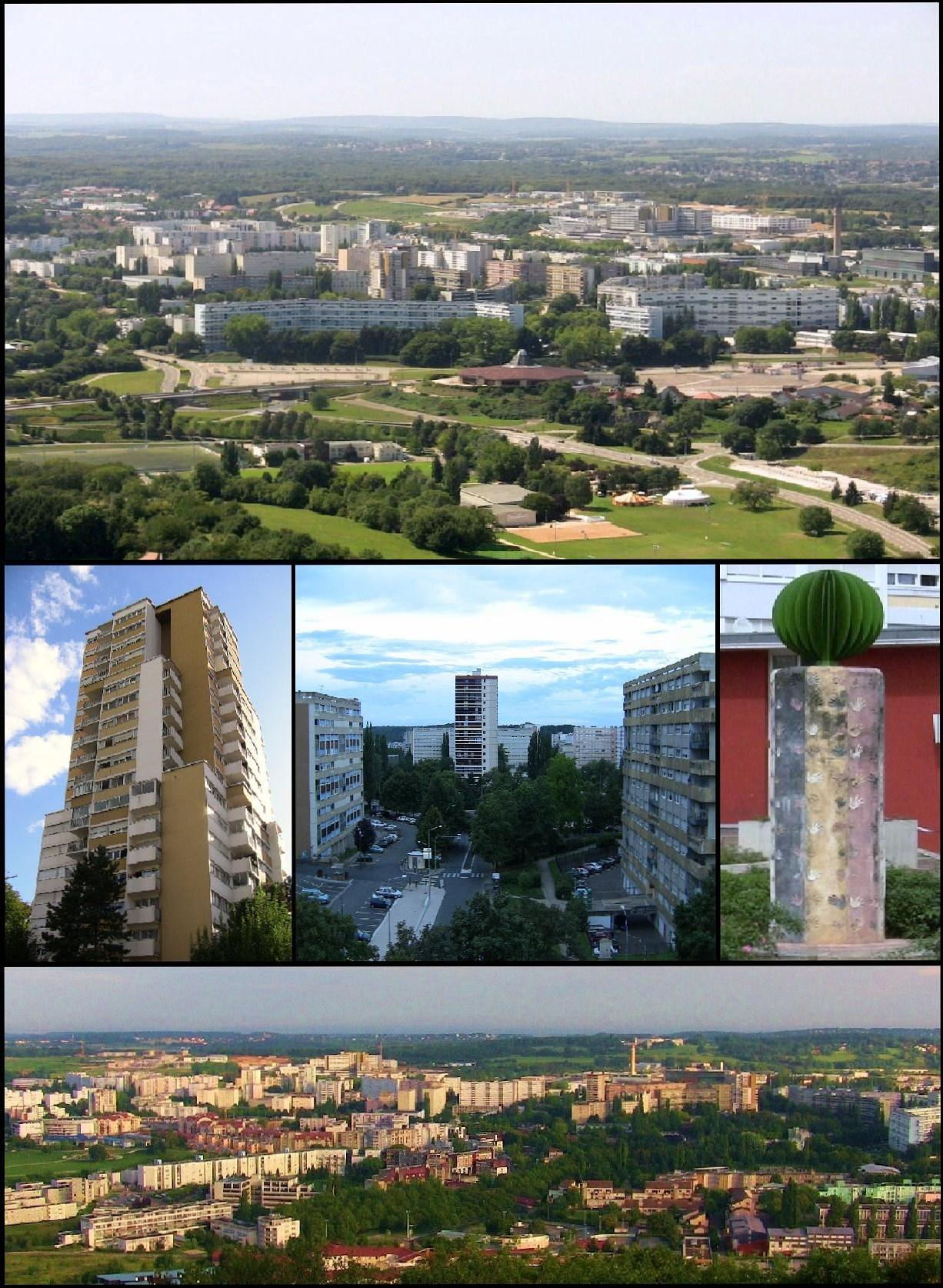
- Top: Planoise from Rosemont Hill. Centre: the tower of Planoise; Époisses sector; the Diversity statue. Bottom: View from the hill of Planoise.
- Location of Planoise
- Location within France Location within Bourgogne-Franche-Comté
- Coordinates: 47°13′17″N 5°58′05″E
- Country: France
- Region: Bourgogne-Franche-Comté
- Department: Doubs
- Arrondissement: Besançon
- Canton: Besançon-1
- Commune: Besançon
- Area^{1}: 1.13 km^{2} (0.44 sq mi)
- Population (2018): 15,378
  - Density: 13,600/km^{2} (35,200/sq mi)
- Time zone: UTC+01:00 (CET)
  - Summer (DST): UTC+02:00 (CEST)
- ^{1} French Land Register data, which excludes lakes, ponds, glaciers > 1 km^{2} (0.386 sq mi or 247 acres) and river estuaries.

Location of Planoise in Besançon

Planoise (French pronunciation: [planwaz]) is an urban area in the western part of Besançon, France, built in the 1960s between the hill of Planoise and the district of Hauts-de-Chazal. It is the most populous district of Besançon, with 15,378 inhabitants (2018, 13% of the total inhabitants). Its inhabitants are called Planoisiens and Planoisiennes.

The area is constantly changing and developing. Despite difficult economic and social conditions, Planoise has become a commercial crossroads and a multicultural sector; the area is home to people from over 50 different cultural origins. It is a highly urbanized area (14,000 inhabitants per square kilometer) with few monuments or sites of interest. Still, the area contains notable buildings such as the Departmental archives of Doubs and the Statue of Diversity.

== History ==
The first traces of life in Planoise date back to 3000 BCE, during the Middle Paleolithic era. Objects were found in the Epoisses area during archaeological excavations, including a flint point dating to the Middle Paleolithic, three bracelets dating to the end of the Iron Age (500 BCE), and an oil lamp dating to Hellenistic Greece (between the first and fourth century BCE.) The objects are conserved in the Musée des Beaux-Arts et d'archéologie de Besançon (Museum of Fine Arts and Archeology.)

During the 13th century the territory of Planoise officially became part of the Imperial city of Besançon, according to Jean de Chalon (earl of Bourgogne). In the 15th century the clergy of Besançon bought the territory and the hill of Planoise. The name "Planoise" first appears officially in records in 1435. The name comes from the Latin word "planesium", which means "plain." At that time, the sector consisted of a large wood and had few inhabitants, mostly farmers.

Between the Middle Ages and the modern era, the area was almost uninhabited. It was an agricultural area, farming mainly potatoes. The prince of Liechtenstein wanted to take the city of Besançon in 1815. He sent an army, which was stopped at Planoise. They abandoned their plans to take the city.

Many farms were built in the area at the beginning of the 20th century. As the population grew, agriculture became a major sector of the economy. The First and Second World Wars did not greatly impact Planoise, although an American soldier was killed there. At the end of the 1950s, Planoise became a new urban area of Besançon.

Construction began in 1962 on 13,000 new dwellings in Planoise, and continued until 1985. The first inhabitants settled in the new buildings in 1968.

At the beginning of the 1970s, the first shops were under construction, and the church of Planoise was built in 1972. Soon after, Diderot school was built, and the Cassin sector expanded. This period is known as the "golden age" of Planoise. In 1977, the population was 12,000 inhabitants.

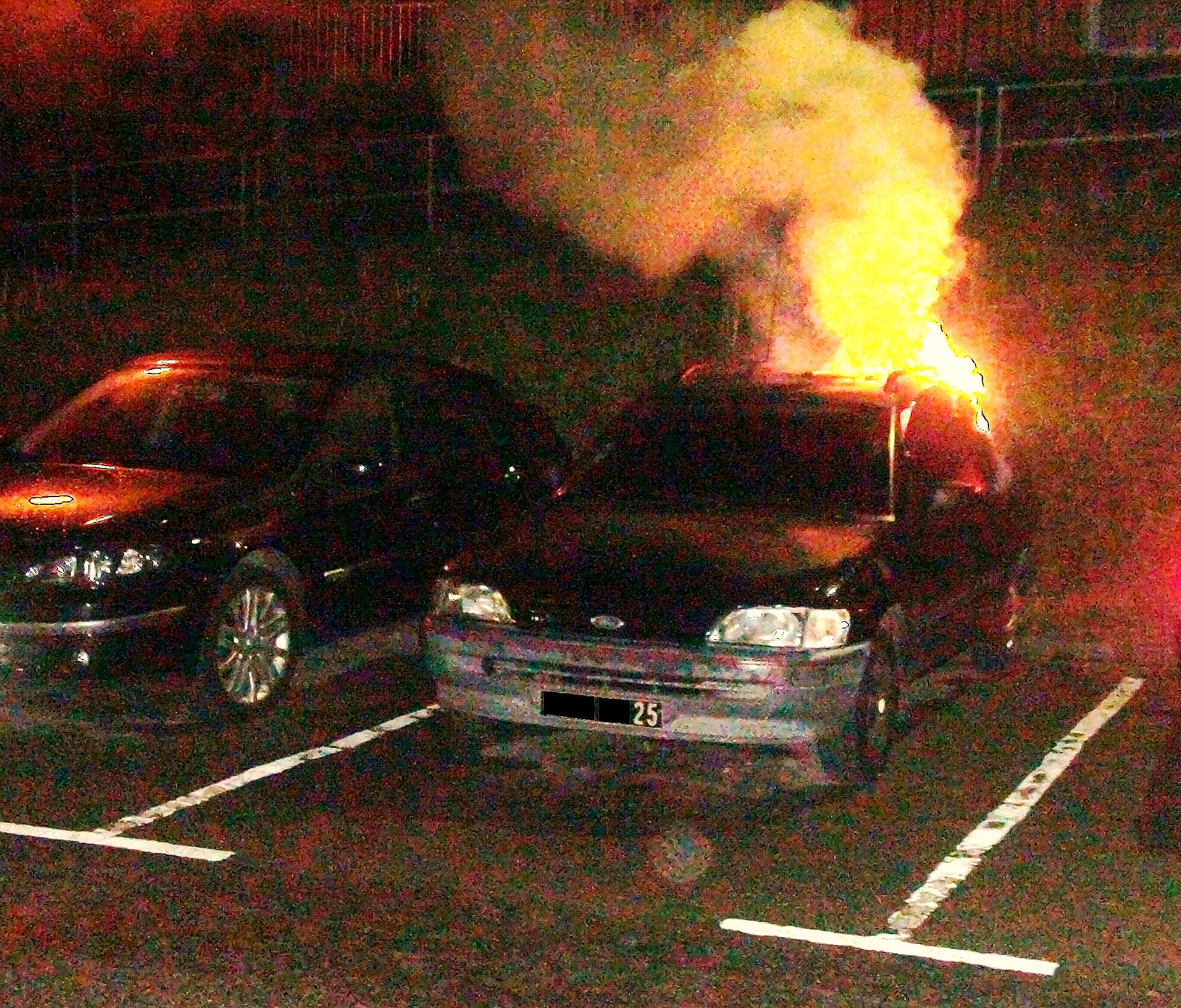
Riots in Planoise (2009)

Like other areas of France at the time, Planoise came into economic and social difficulties. Since 1985 the area has been classed as a "sensitive urban zone" by the municipality, and 40% of the inhabitants aged 18–25 years are unemployed.

In 2005, during the 2005 civil unrest in France, the "Forum" building was burned. Salah Gaham died in the fire. A policeman was attacked in the Cassin sector in 2009 who was attempting to stop a riot, and there was a hold-up of a bus at the Planoise bus stop in 2008. This followed many strikes by the bus conductors of Besançon public transport.

To stop the civil unrest in Planoise, the municipality tried to react promptly by opening a commissionership in Cassin sector. However, it was burned in 2007. Police presence has been increased in the area. Since 2000, an area of the neighborhood was classed as a "zone franche urbaine" (exoneration of taxes for new firms created over the following 10 years), enabling the establishment of many new companies and businesses.

== Geography ==
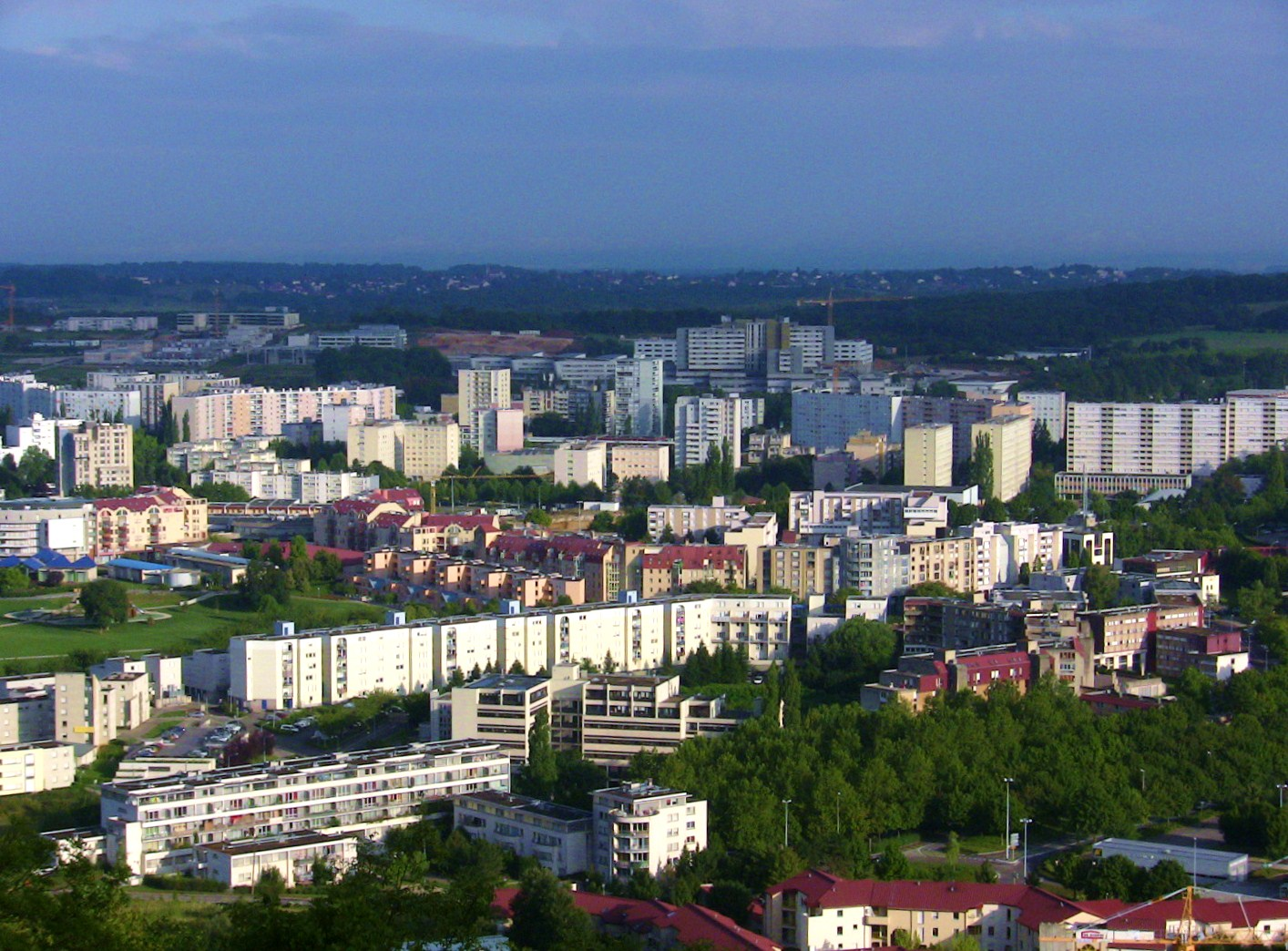
Ile-de-France sector

Planoise is located in the west of Besançon, in the Canton of Besançon-1. Planoise is bounded west by Franois and Grandfontaine; Pirey to the north; Saint-Ferjeux and the center of Besançon to the east; and Velotte and Avanne-Aveney to the south. The area is located in a plain measuring 300 hectares, between the hill of Planoise (490m) and the hill of Rosemont (466m). The river Doubs is one kilometre away. Two large woods surround the neighborhood: the wood "Monsieur" (en: "Sir Wood") and the wood of Pirey.

The principal road is Dole street, which is also the principal road of Besançon. The west boulevard joins the area at Velotte. In the center of Planoisen the principal roads are Île-de-France avenue, Bourgonge road, and Franche-Comté street.

== Environment ==
Wildlife in Planoise consists of rats, hedgehogs, and some snakes. Common birds are pigeons and ravens. Many cats and dogs are at large. Livestock, including horses and goats, are kept in the Malcombe area.

Planoise, while urban, has a rich environmental heritage and a lot of wooded space, and urban trees, particularly beeches, firs, Aesculus, and birches, are present on all streets. The urban park of Planoise is a wooded park with playgrounds, and is located in Cassin sector. The municipality plans to build a new playground.

The wood of Planoise (located at the hill of Planoise) has a large diversity of animals and flora. Foxes, boars, squirrels, and birds are present. Vegetation includes beeches, firs, aesculus, oaks, ferns, and Platanus. A network of trails allows an easy access to the Fort of Planoise in the wood. The only new infrastructure is the Water tower of Planoise.

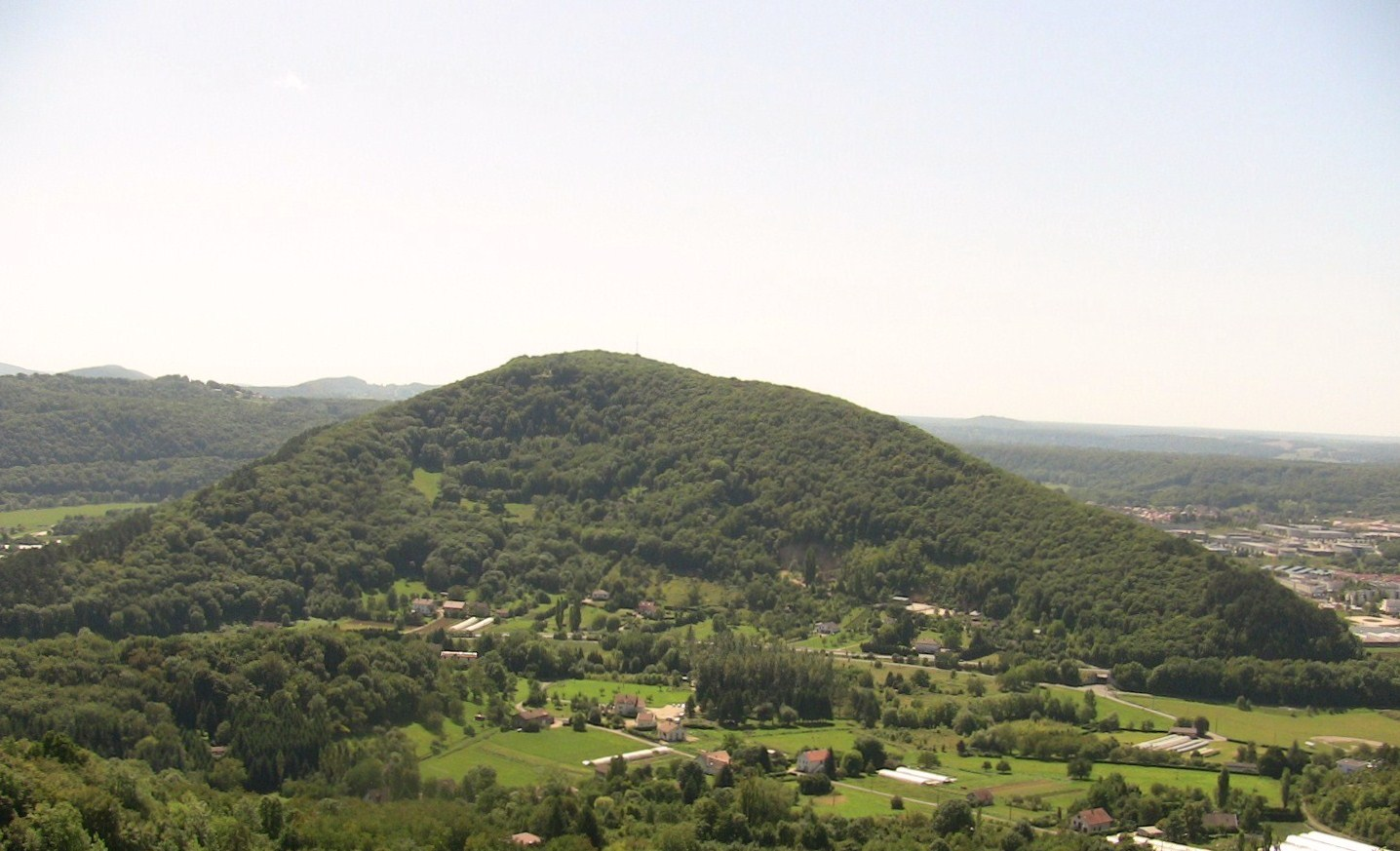
The hill of Planoise

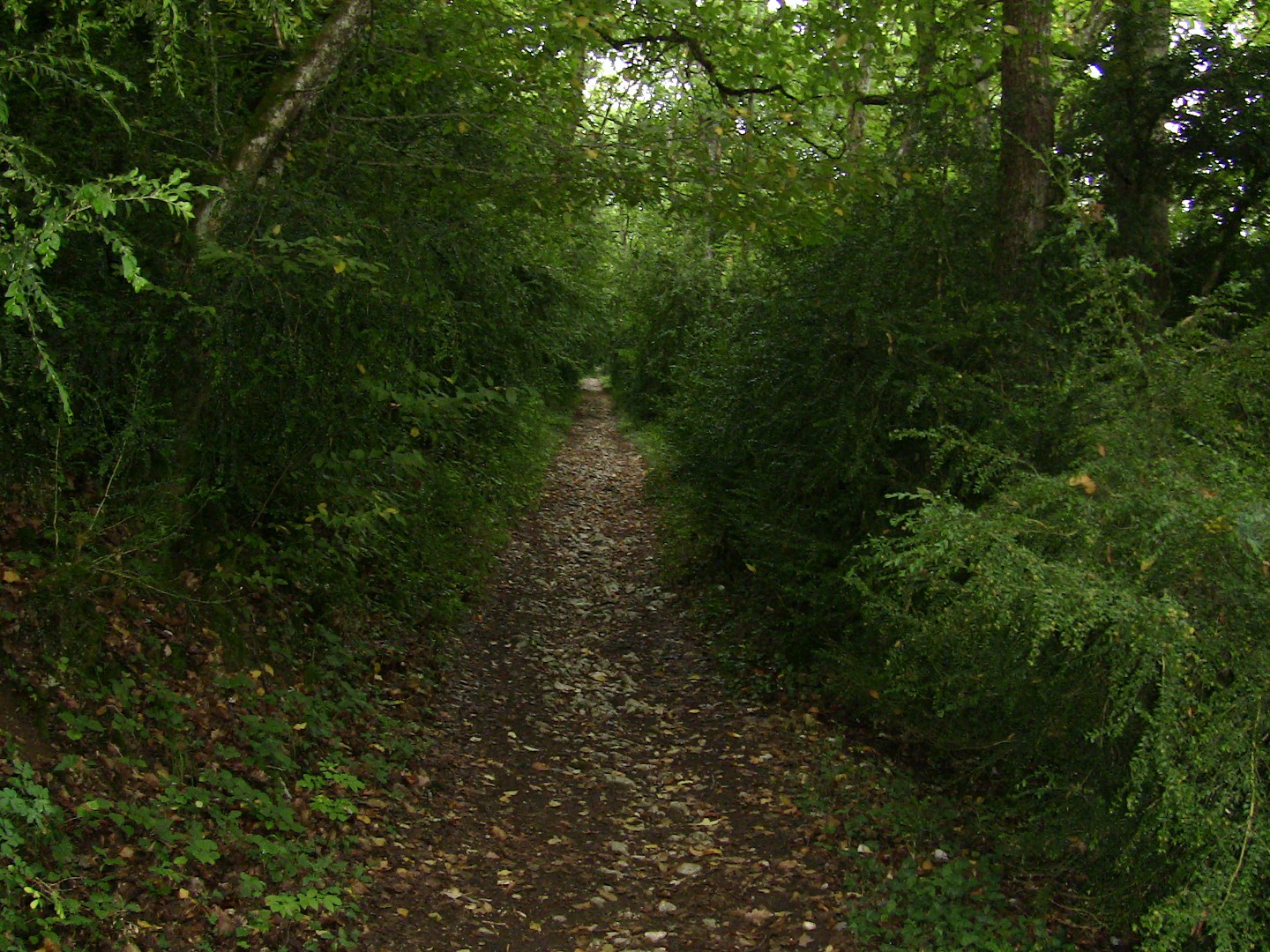
A trail in the woods

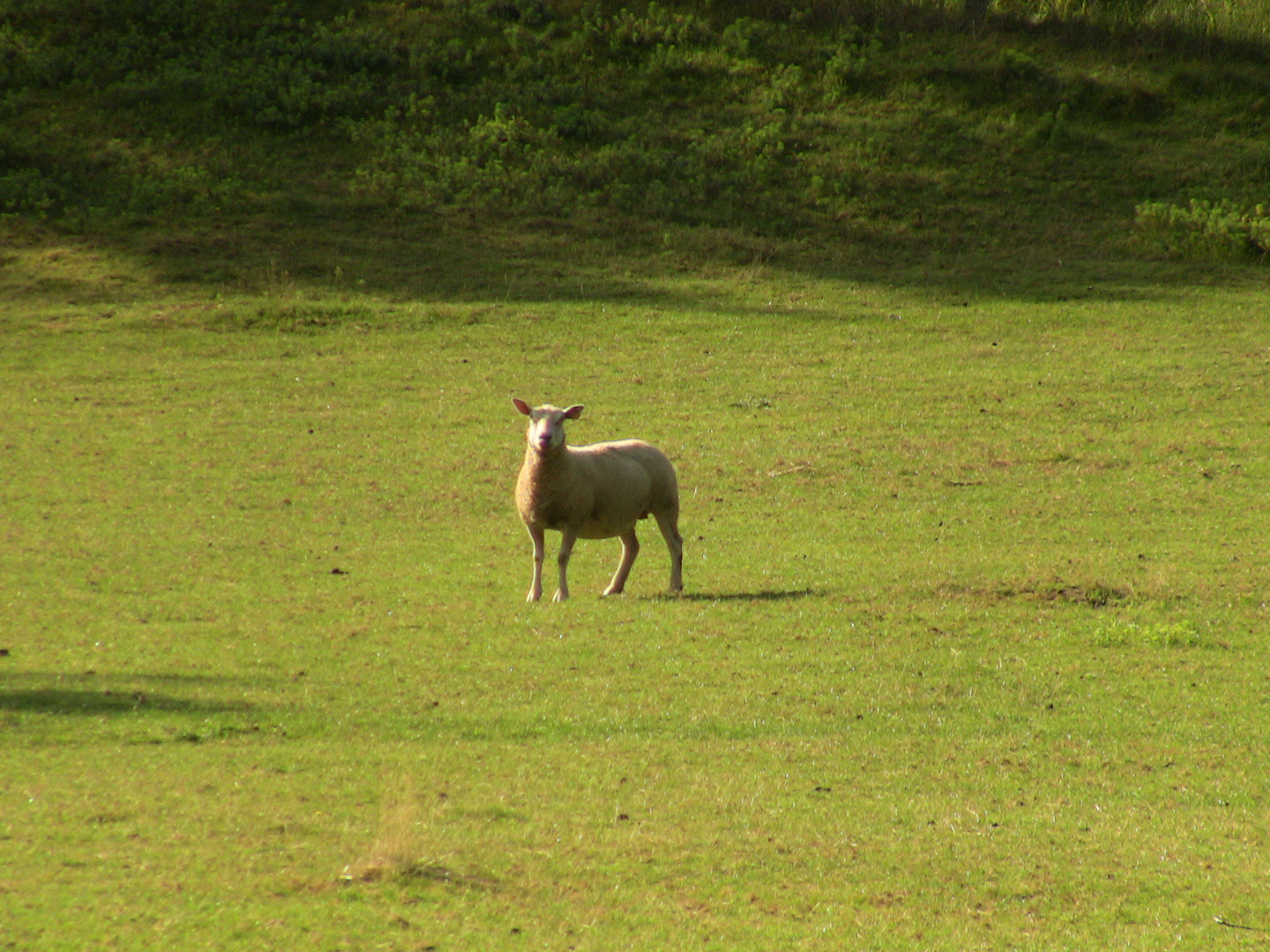
A sheep near Malcombe sector

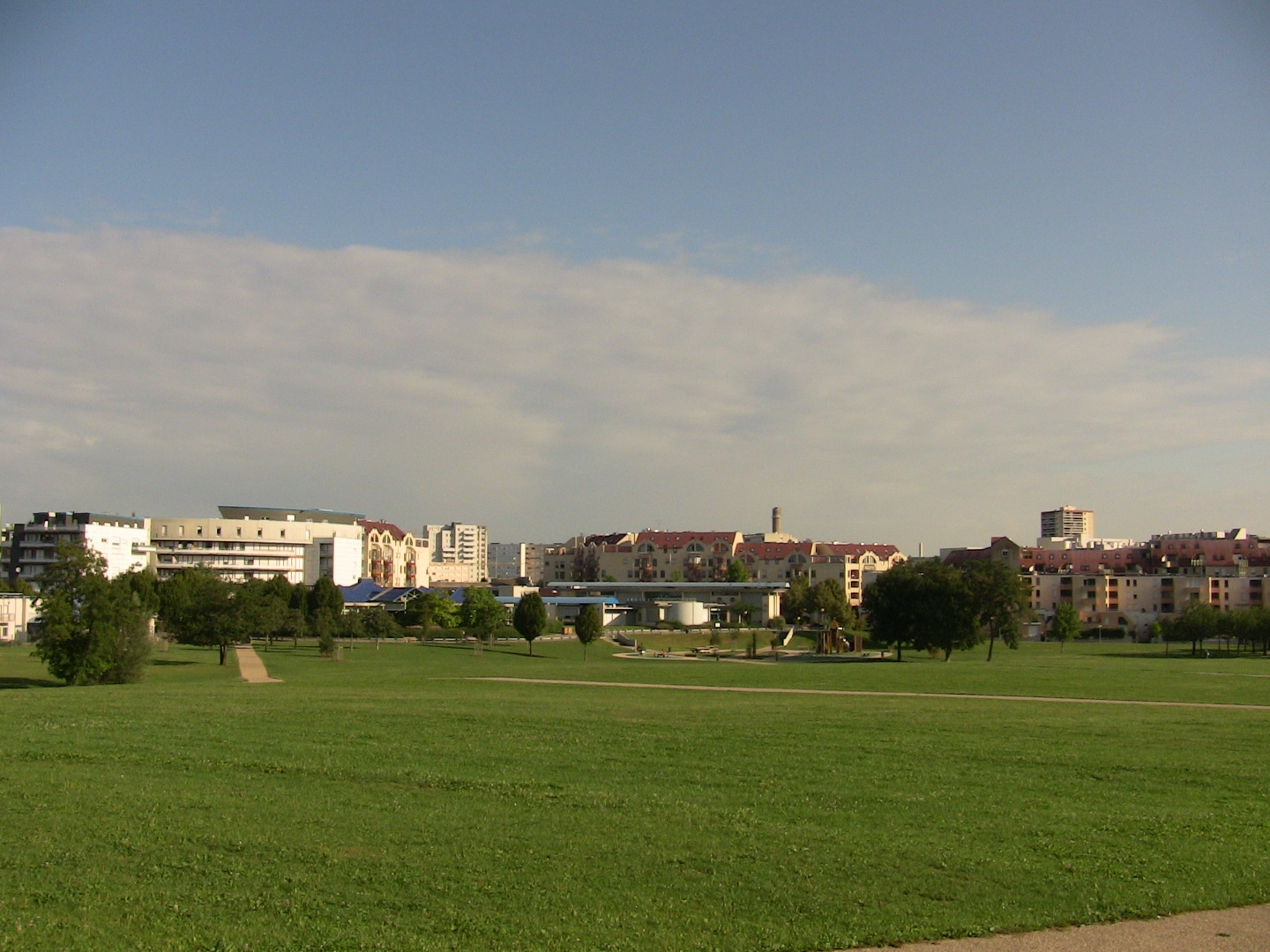
The urban park

=== Sectors ===
Planoise is divided into seven sectors:

- Île-de-France sector: The name of this sector comes from a French region (Ile-de-France), because the principal street of the sector is called Ile-de-France street. The area is the most populated in Planoise, with a third of the total population (7,000 residents). Ile-de-France is considered as the worse sector of Franche-Comté, with the highest rate of unemployment (around 42% of those under 25) and the highest crime rates. The sector was built in 1967.
- Époisses sector: This was the first new sector of Planoise, built between 1967 and 1976. A lot of inhabitants called this sector "Franche-Comté", which is the name of the principal street of the sector, and the name of the region as well. Here were found artifacts dating to 3000 BCE.
- Cassin sector: Named after the French politician, René Cassin, the main plaza of the sector (René Cassin Place) was built between 1985 and 1992. The area has a lot of shops.
- Hauts-de-Chazal sector: Hauts-de-Chazal was built starting in 2002 and hosts the new hospital of Besançon. The sector also has a business district and a residential quarter.
- Châteaufarine sector: Châteaufarine is the major commercial sector of Franche-Comté, with two large malls and more than 70 other markets.
- Malcombe sector: The Malcombe is a recreational sector, built in 1976. The sector is home to the Besançon Bison (an American football club).
- Micropolis sector: Micropolis is the name of the exposition park and of the concert hall. The sector was built in 1988.

== Economy ==
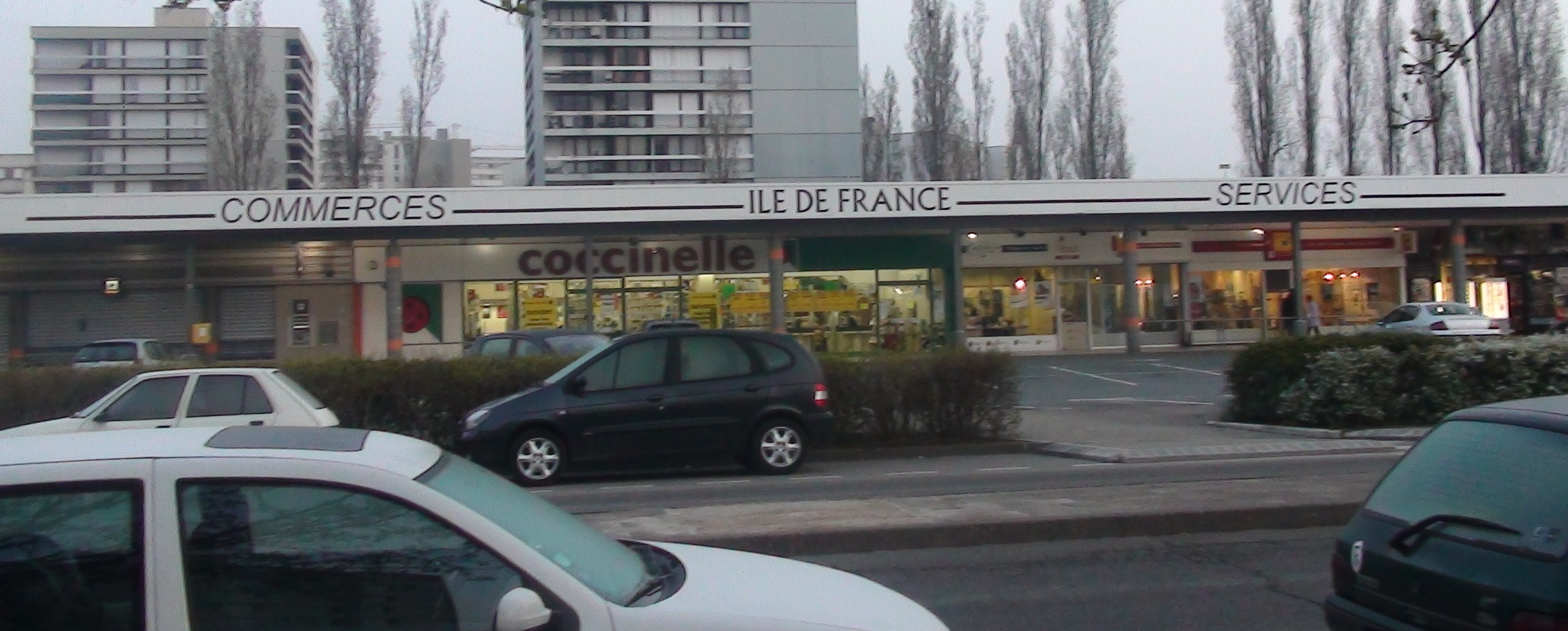
Mall of Île-de-France

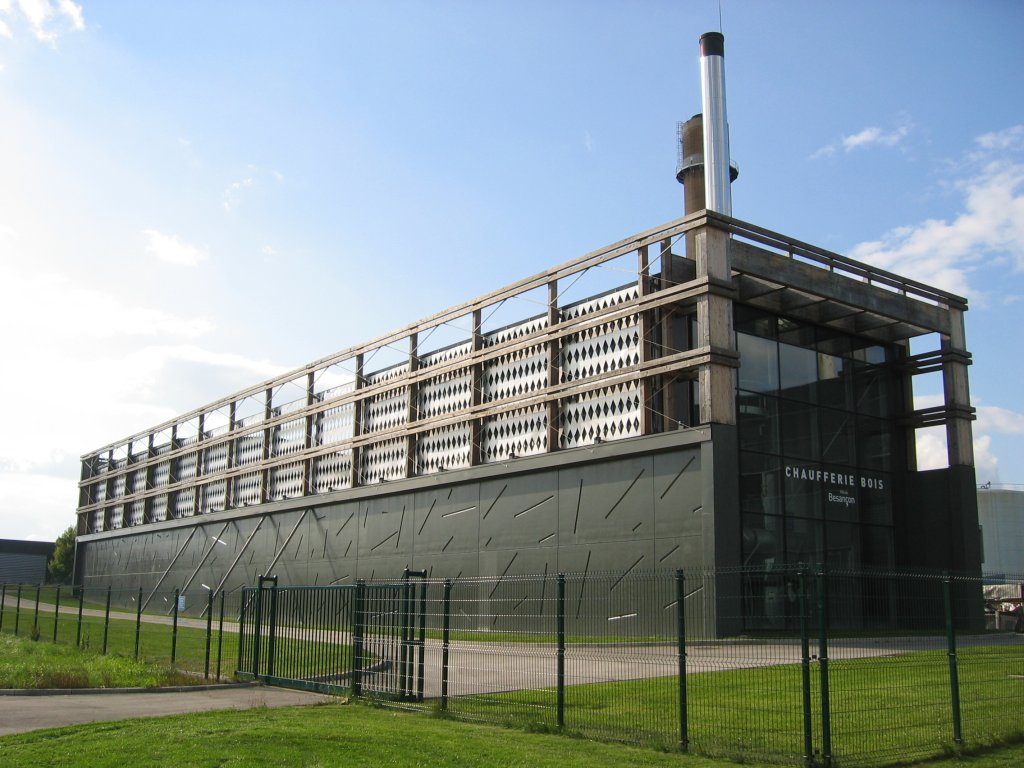
Municipal wood boiler

=== Shops and services ===
Planoise has a lot of shops and services, and three malls: the mall of Epoisses (built in 1969), the mall of Île-de-France (build in 1975), and the mall of Cassin (called Park Mall, built in 1984). The shops are complemented by the commercial zone of Châteaufarine, which has a large mall and 80 other shops. All sectors of Planoiseare served by the essential shops such as hairdressers and bakeries, and Cassin sector has other shops like restaurants and dress shops. Planoise has six hotels, located in Cassin and Epoisses sectors. An itinerant kebab seller visits Epoisses and Île-de-France sectors daily, and two or three times a week a fair takes place in Île-de-France, Epoisses, and Cassin sectors.

The sector has two post offices, two medical centers, an ANPE agency, a CAF agency (family allowance), one Treasury, and other services. The wood boiler is the only industrial infrastructure in the sector.

=== Employment ===
At the last census (1999), Planoise had 8,530 workers, 40% of the area's population. Most workers are in the Tertiary sector of the economy (administration, education, health, shops, services, and transportation). The unemployment rate was 25% for the total population and 40% for those aged 18–24 years in 1999.

Distribution of jobs by area of activity
	Agriculture	Industry	Construction	Tertiary	Trade	Services
Planoise	0.2%	16.8%	5.2%	77.8%	12.1%	18.0%
Besançon	0.3%	14.0%	3.7%	82.0%	11.9%	18.1%
France	4.2%	18.2%	5.8%	71.8%	13.2%	19.7%
INSEE 1999

== Demographics ==
Planoise was a partially uninhabited rural zone for many years; the population boom of the 1960s changed the sector. Today, Planoise is the largest sector of Besançon, ahead of Chaprais (15,500) and the center of Besançon (10.000 inhabitants).

Historical population
Year	Pop.	±% p.a.
1990	18,489	—
1999	17,265	−0.76%
2018	15,378	−0.61%
Source: INSEE and SIG

== Transport ==
The area is 20 minutes from the center of Besançon, and served by the urban public transport of Besançon (Ginko company), with seven urban routes and two special routes (nights and Sundays). Since 2014, it is connected with the city centre by trams.

== Architecture ==
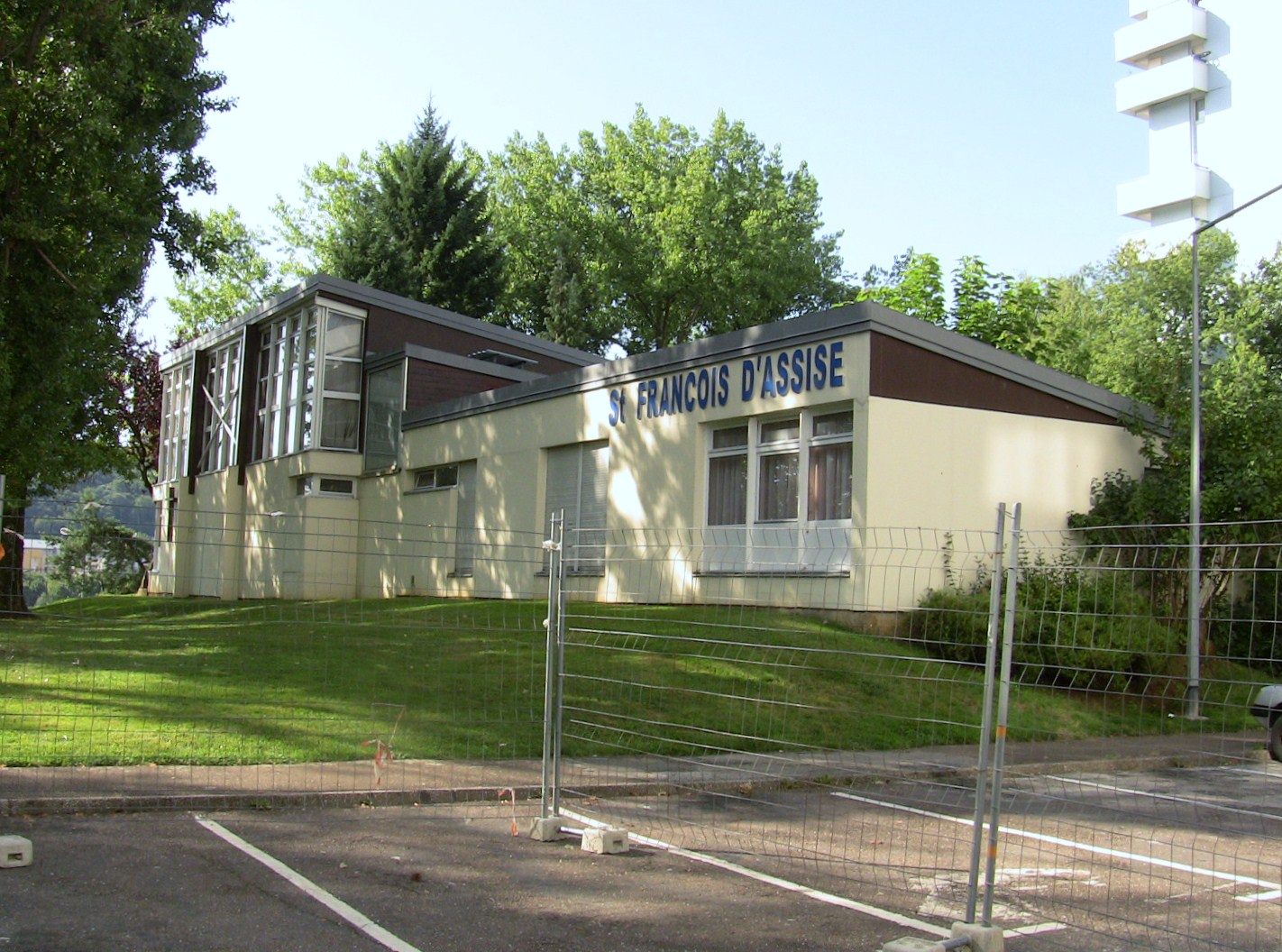
Church of Francis of Assisi

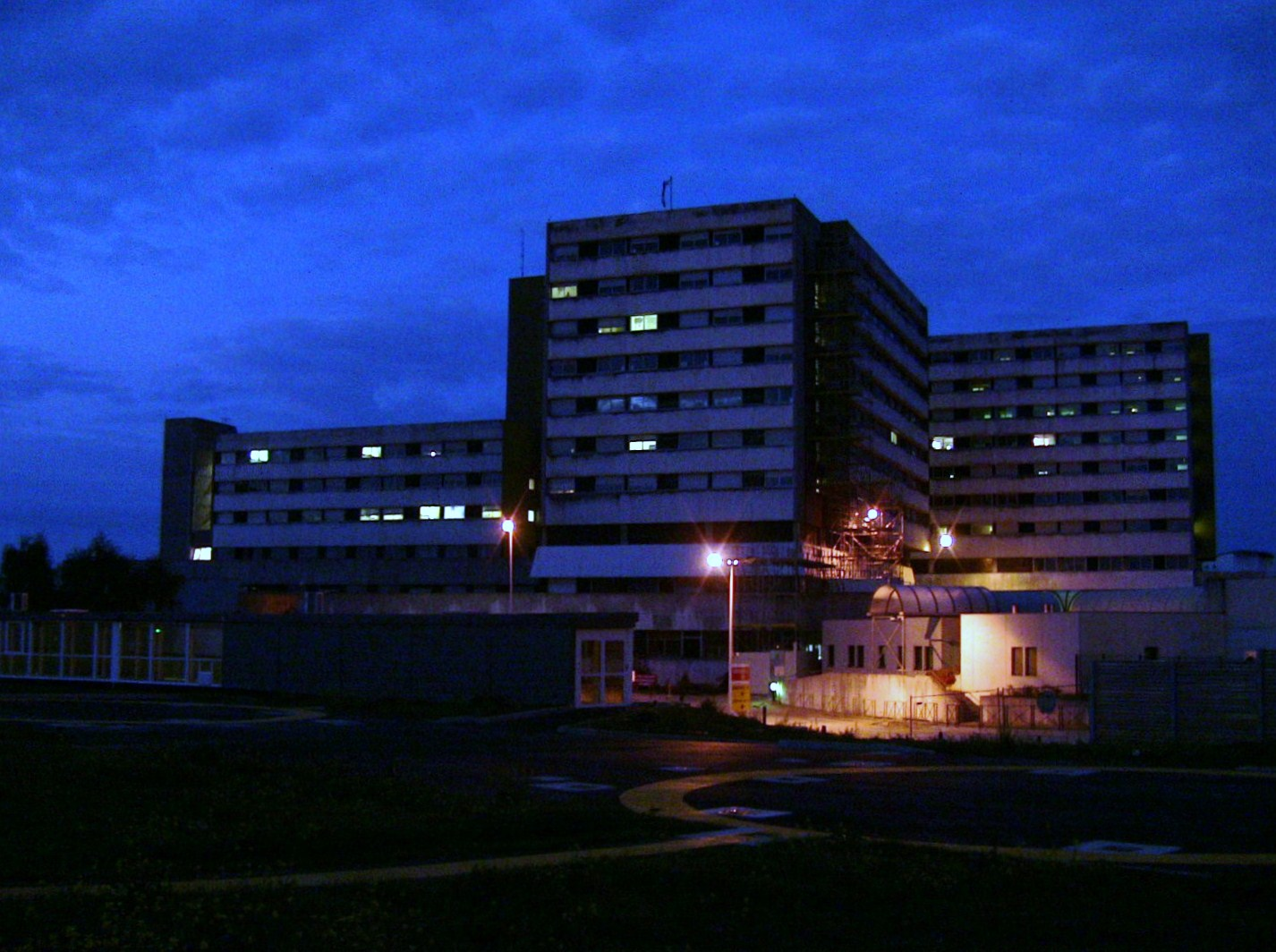
Jean Minjoz Hospital

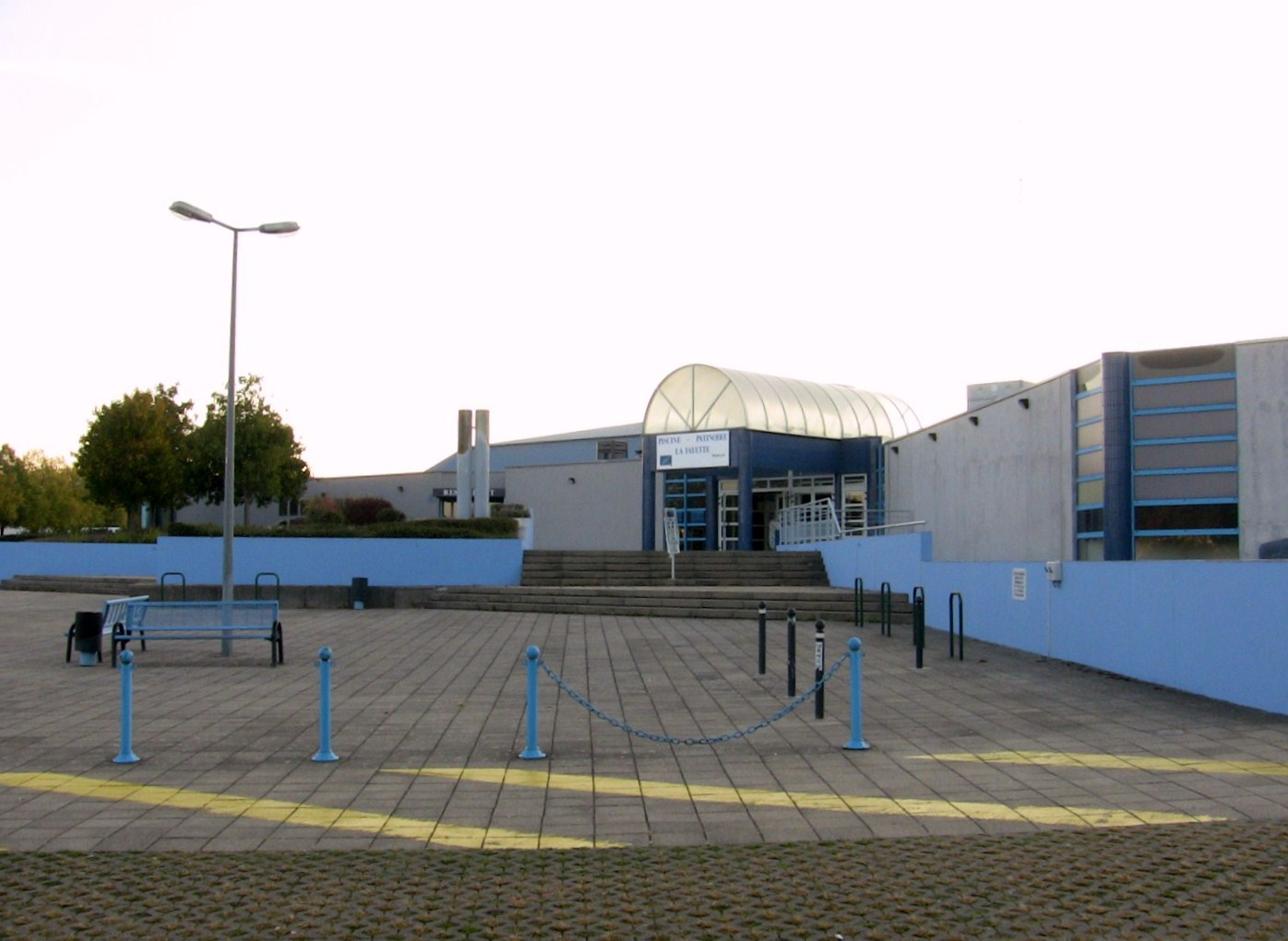
Ice rink/Swimming pool

Planoise has little architectural heritage compared to that of the center of Besançon. However, four notable statues decorate the area, two in the Cassin sector and two in the Ile-de-France sector. The "Statue of Diversity", located in a roundabout of Ile-de-France sector, is a veritable symbol of this area. The others are the statue of Diderot school, in stone, the "Statue of the World" (located in a roundabout in the Cassin sector, near the Lafayette swimming pool) and the statue of Tristan Bernard school, also located in Cassin sector. Epoisses fountain dates to 1874, and has the blazon of Besançon on its face. An old laundry in the margins of the new area was built in 1812 and renovated in 1996.

=== Places of worship ===
- The church of Francis of Assisi was built from 1970 to 1972 in Franche-Comté sector by Maurice Novarina. It is the first and only church in the area
- Al-fath mosque, inaugurated in 2008 by the mayor of Besançon
- Cepee Evangelist church, located in Cassin sector

=== Sports and culture ===
- Nelson Mandela library and médiathèque, located in Ile-de-France sector
- Théatre de l'espace (en: space theater).
- Gymnasium of Châteaufarine
- Gymnasium of Diderot
- Ice rink of Lafayette.
- Swimming pool of Lafayette

=== Administrative buildings ===
- The Departmental archives of Doubs, located in Cassin sector
- Jean Minjoz Hospital
- Franche-Comté clinic
- The commissioner of Planoise
- Fort of Planoise
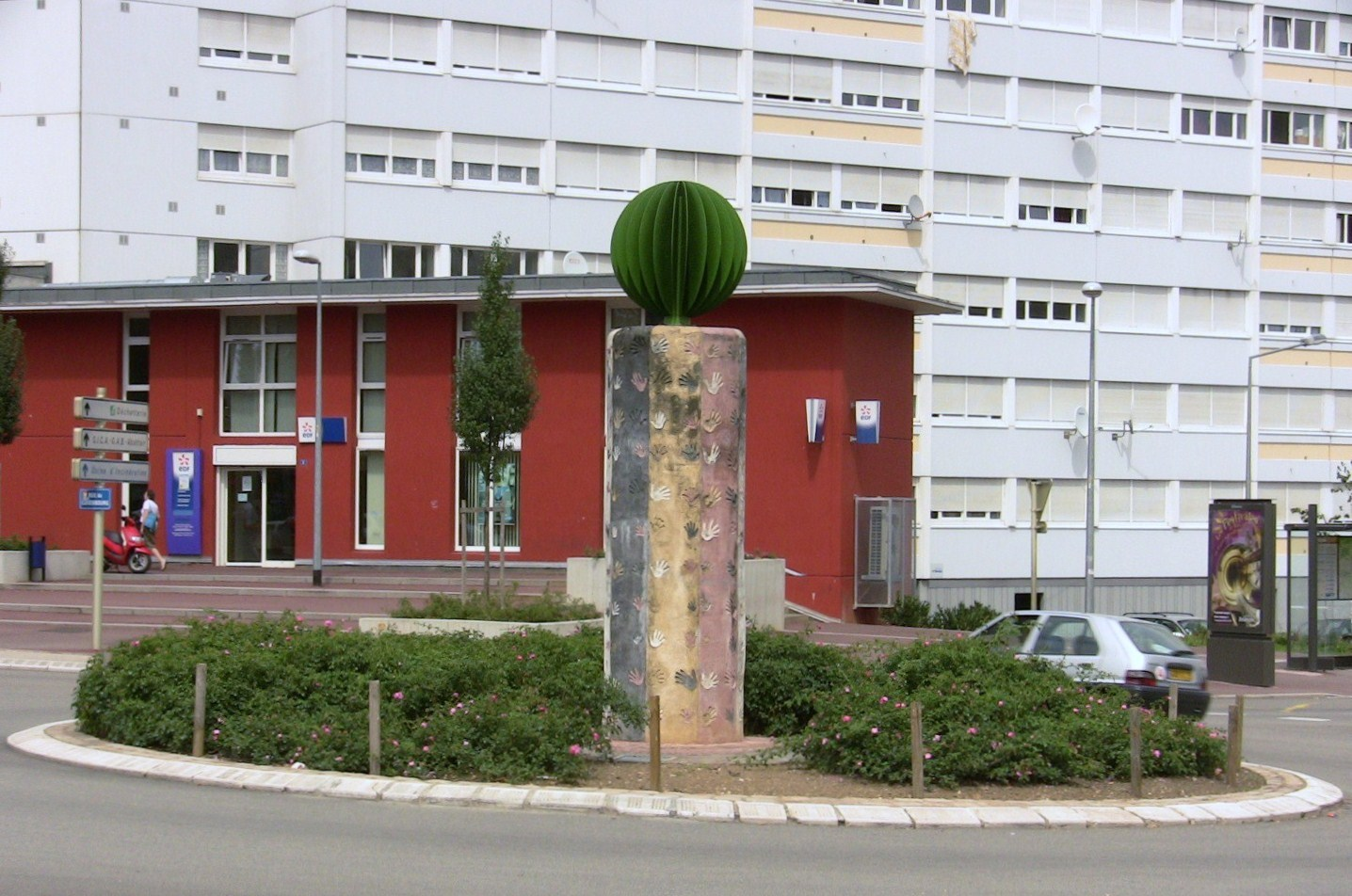
The "Statue of Diversity"

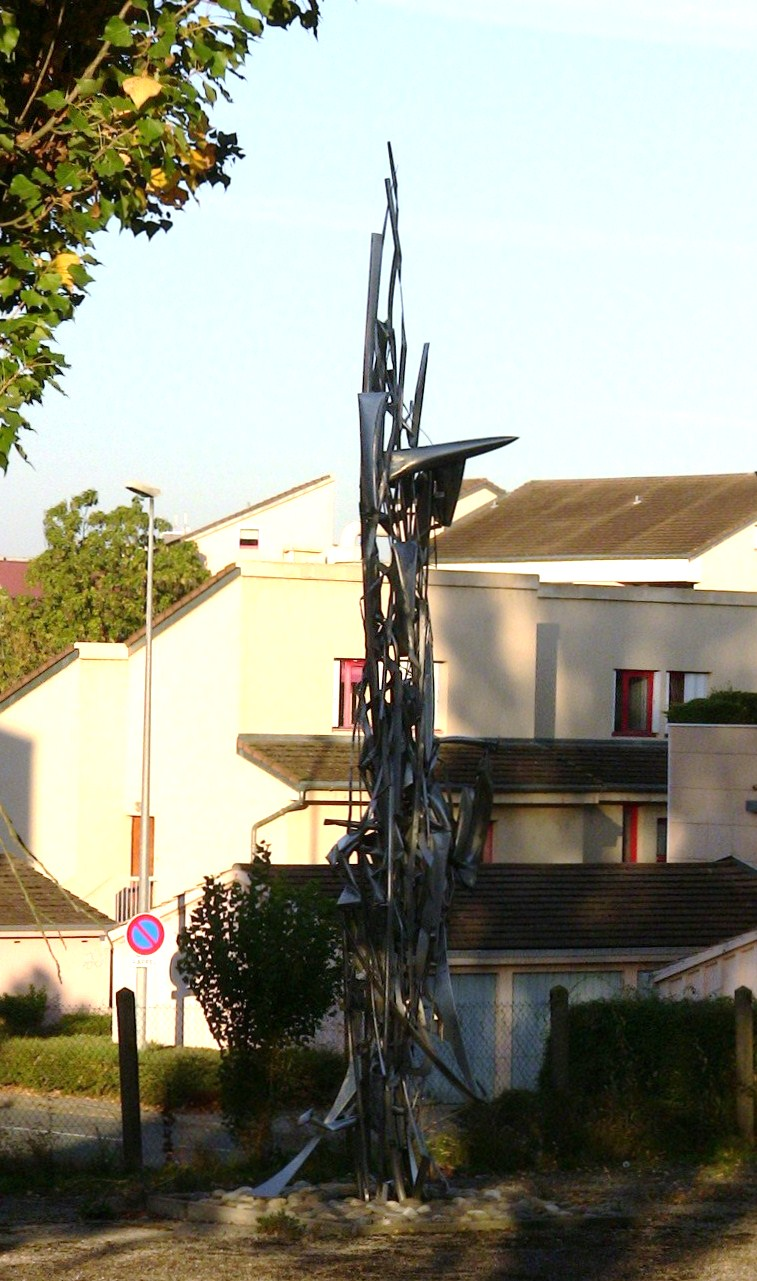
Statue of Tristan Bernard school

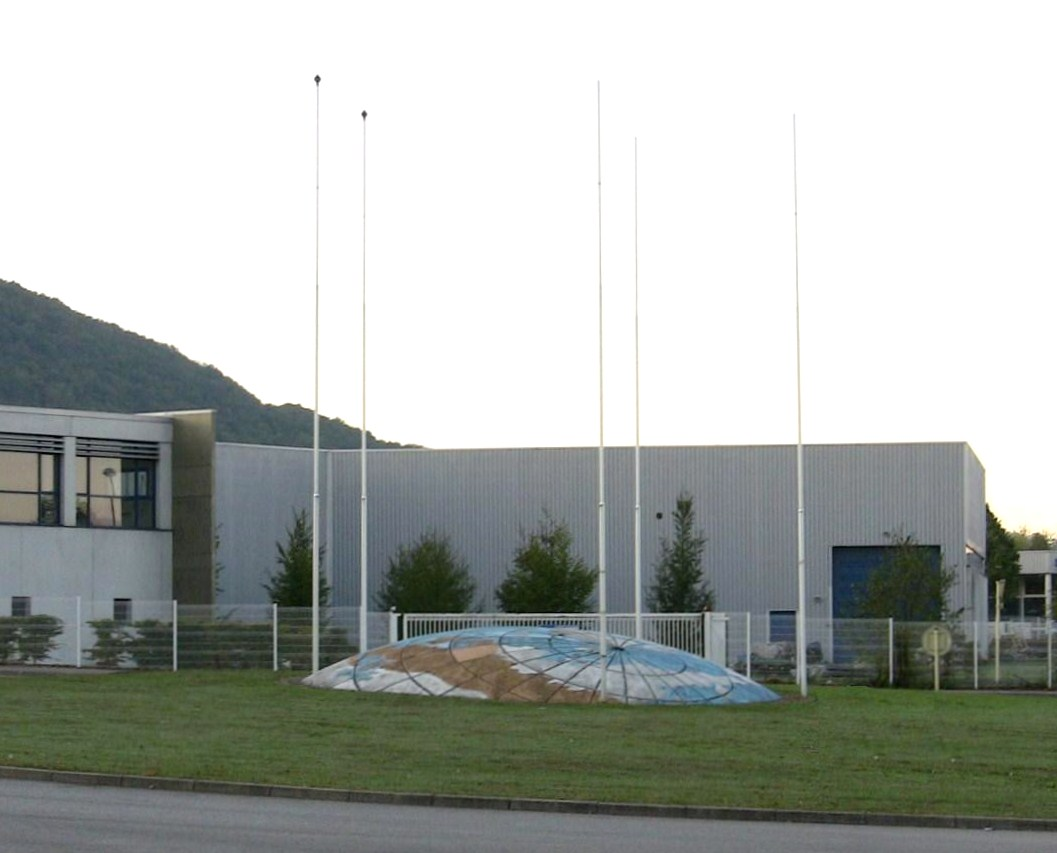
The "statue of the world"

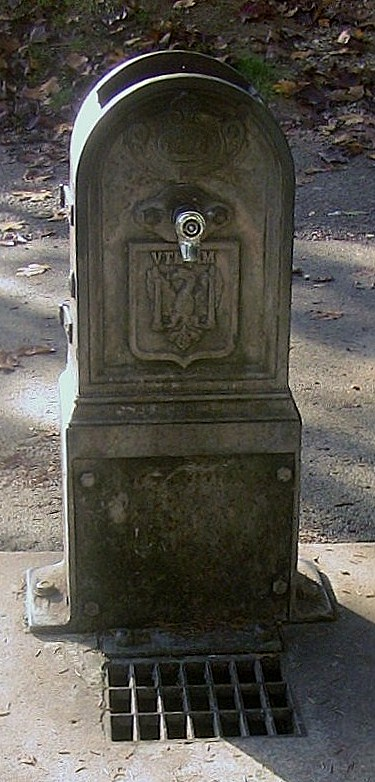
Epoisses fountain

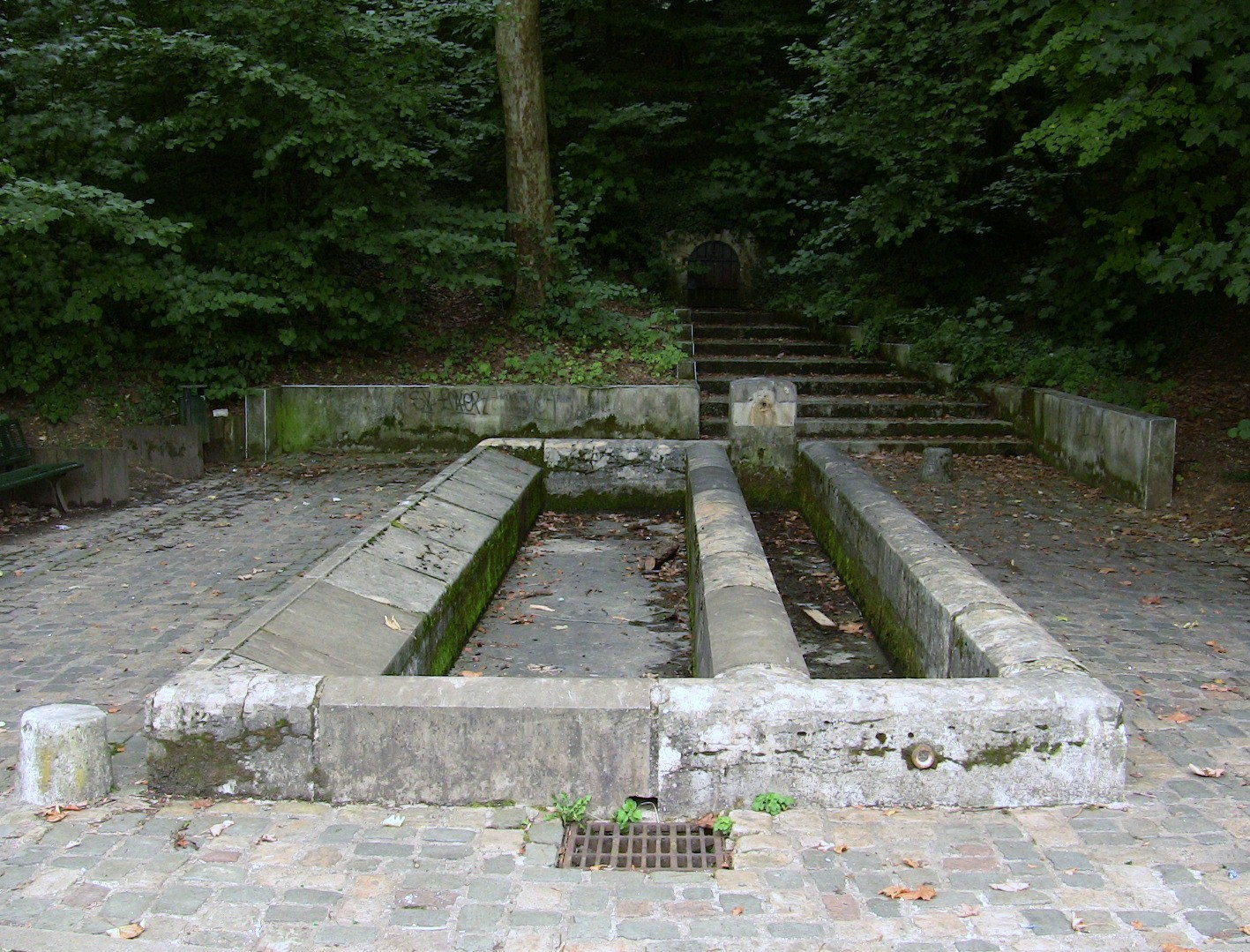
Old laundry of Planoise

== Education ==
There are 12 kindergartens, five elementary schools, two colleges, and two high schools in Planoise.

== Culture ==
=== Events ===
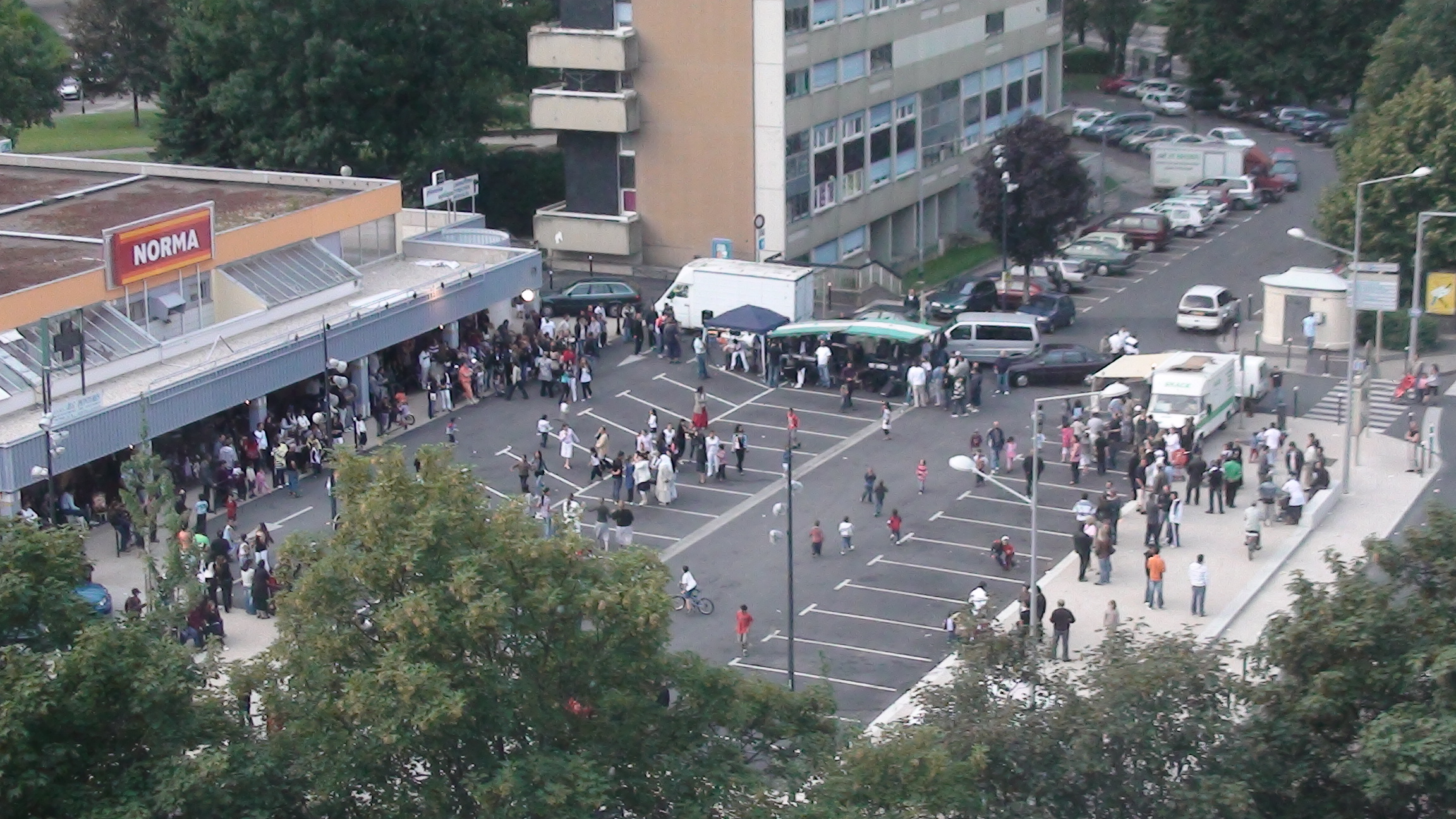
Music party in Epoisses sector

Festivals are popular; music parties have been organised by residents of the Epoisses sector. Many sporting events take place in Malcombe sector over the course of the year (football matches, for example), but the most important competitions take place from June to August, during an event called "Vital'été". This event, popular among teenagers of the area, encompasses many sports, including football, volleyball, climbing, and roller hockey.

The exposition park of Micropolis hosts many concerts and other events. The "Foire comtoise" (Comtoise Fair) is the major amusement park of the region; the Micronora show is a microtechnology exposition. Other events such as fireworks, "fete des voisins" (neighborhood parties), and garage sales, take place year round.

=== Sports ===
- Planoise Karate Academy is a karate club located in Ile-de-France sector. Students include Ali Yugo (double champion of France), Luc Menyomo (double world champion, double European champion, and double champion of France), and Baba Sanogho (champion of France 1993 and vice champion of Africa 1997)
- A.S.C. Planoise, a football club
- Boxing club of Planoise, located in Cassin sector
- Profession sports 25 is an organisation offering athletic activities for teenagers

=== Radio and newspapers ===
- The Passerelle (The Gateway), a local newspaper
- South radio
- Décibels radio

=== Associations ===
- Pari Association, an association created in 1981 to teach French to adults and children
- Des Racines et des Feuilles (Roots and Leaves) a genealogy association
- Julienne-Javel Association, a group that helps HLMs lodgers renovate their apartments
- Franco-Turkish Association

== Notable people ==
- Salah Gaham, death during the 2005 civil unrest in France
- Jean-Louis Fousseret, mayor of Besançon
- Barbara Romagnan, politician and director of Canton of Besançon-Planoise
- Sandrine Delerce, handball champion and physical education teacher at Diderot School

== Photos ==
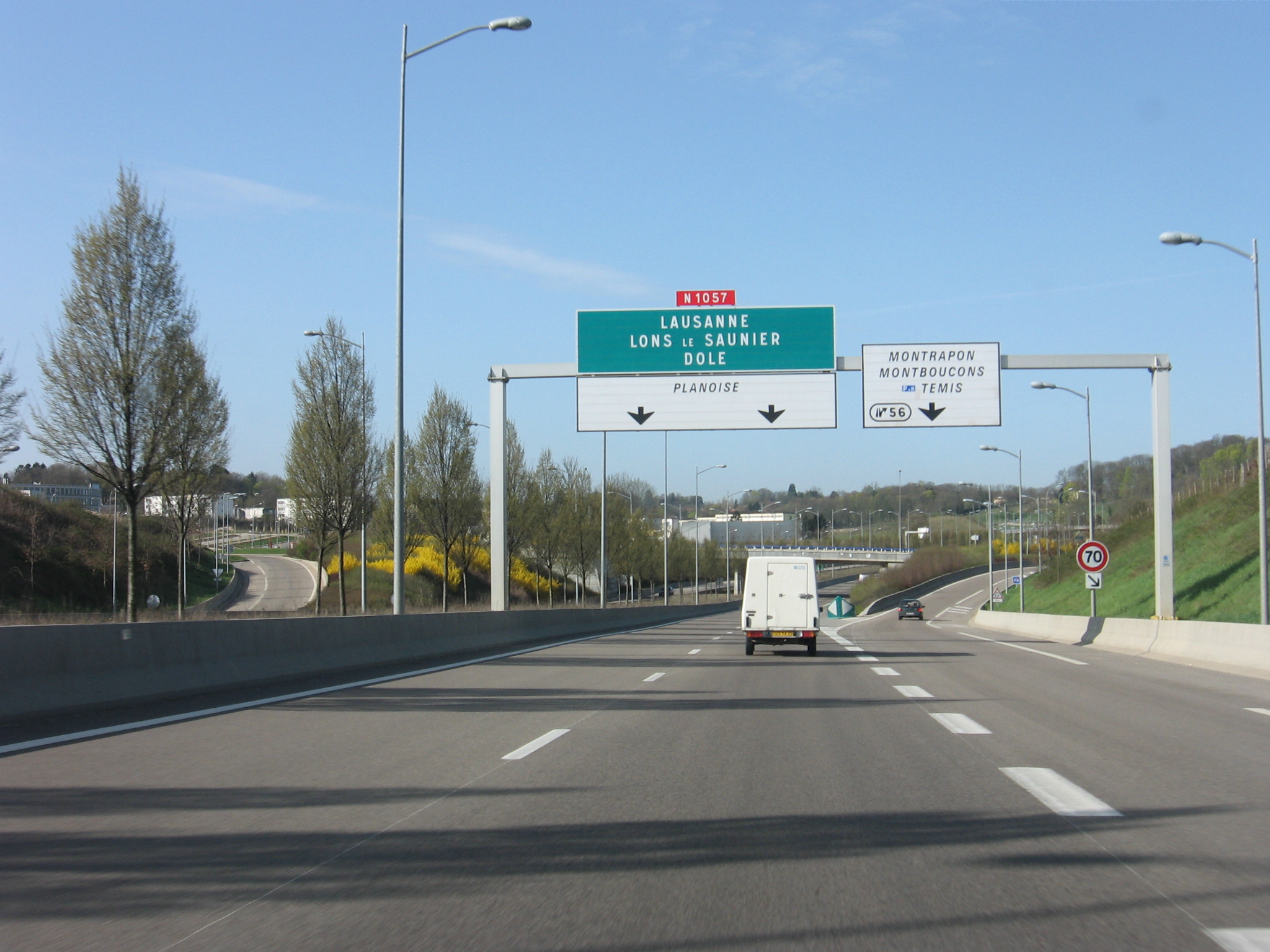
Entering Planoise

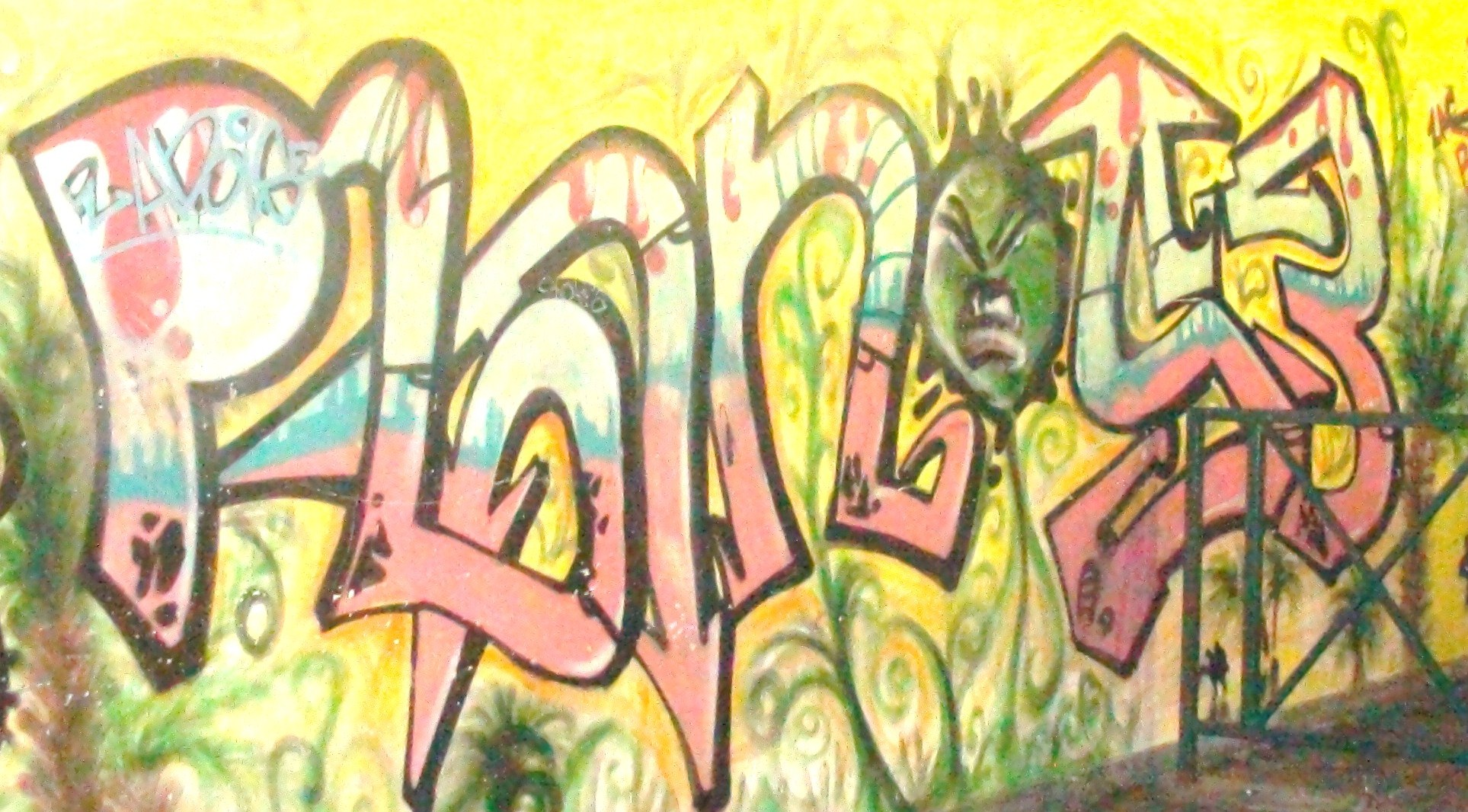
Graffiti

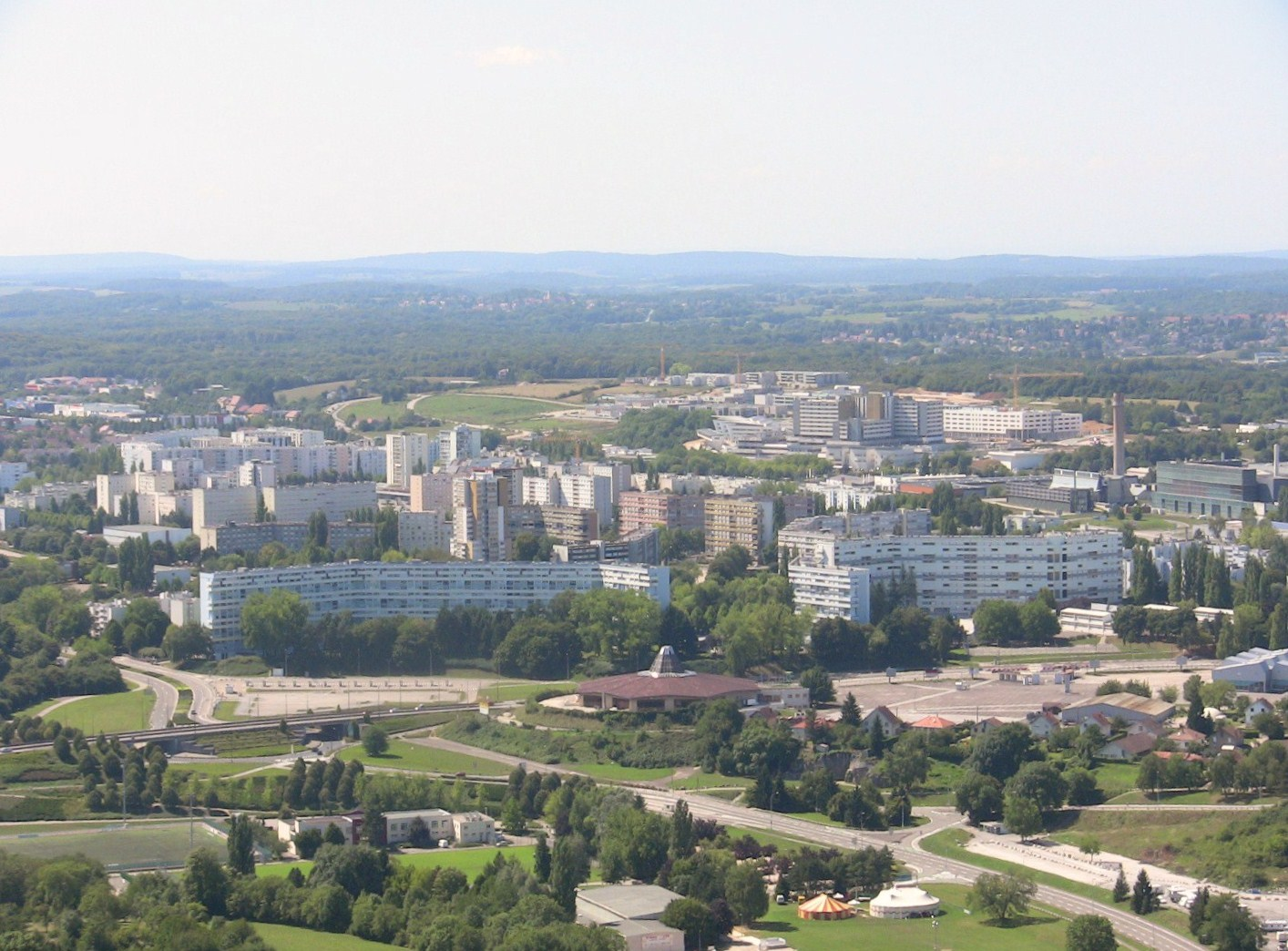
General view of Planoise

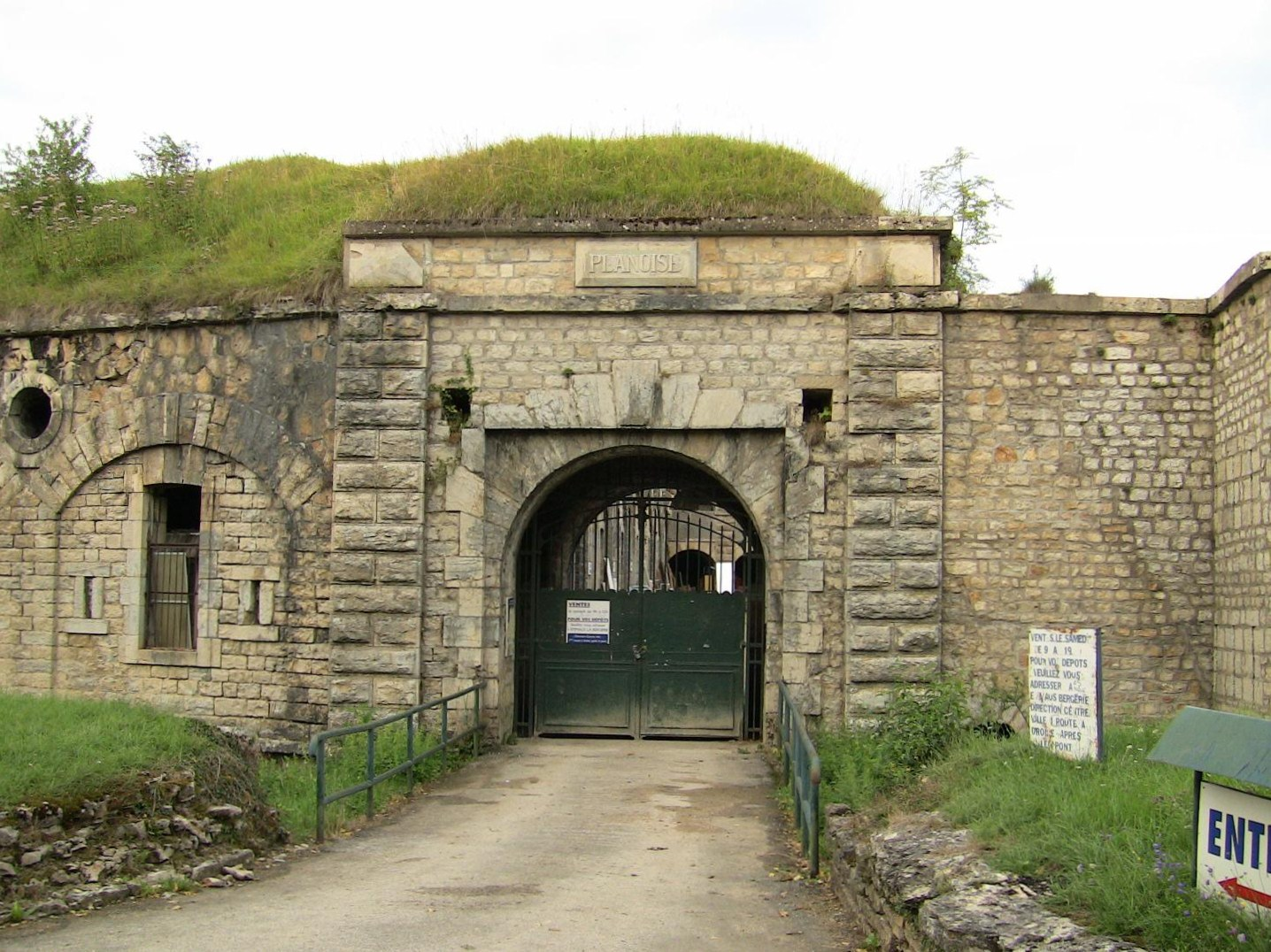
Entry of the fort of Planoise

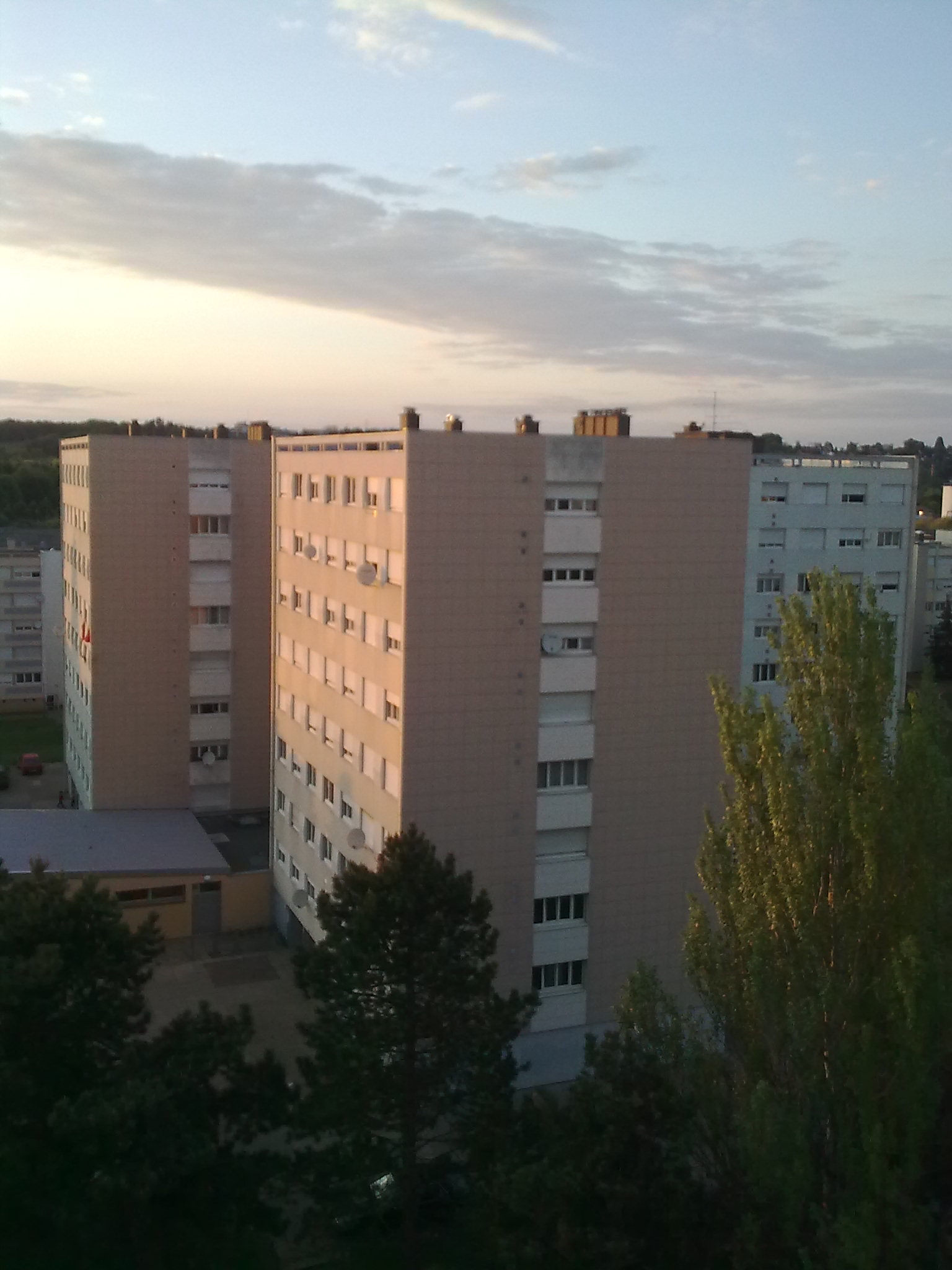
Buildings in the sector of Ile-de-France

== See also ==
- Doubs
- Immigration to Besançon
