= Chronology of Planoise =

Planoise is a new urban zone created at the end of the 1960s because of the high demography of the city (Besançon). Before the buildings, there were a lot of farms and some monuments. This hamlet was transformed into a real little town within a decade.

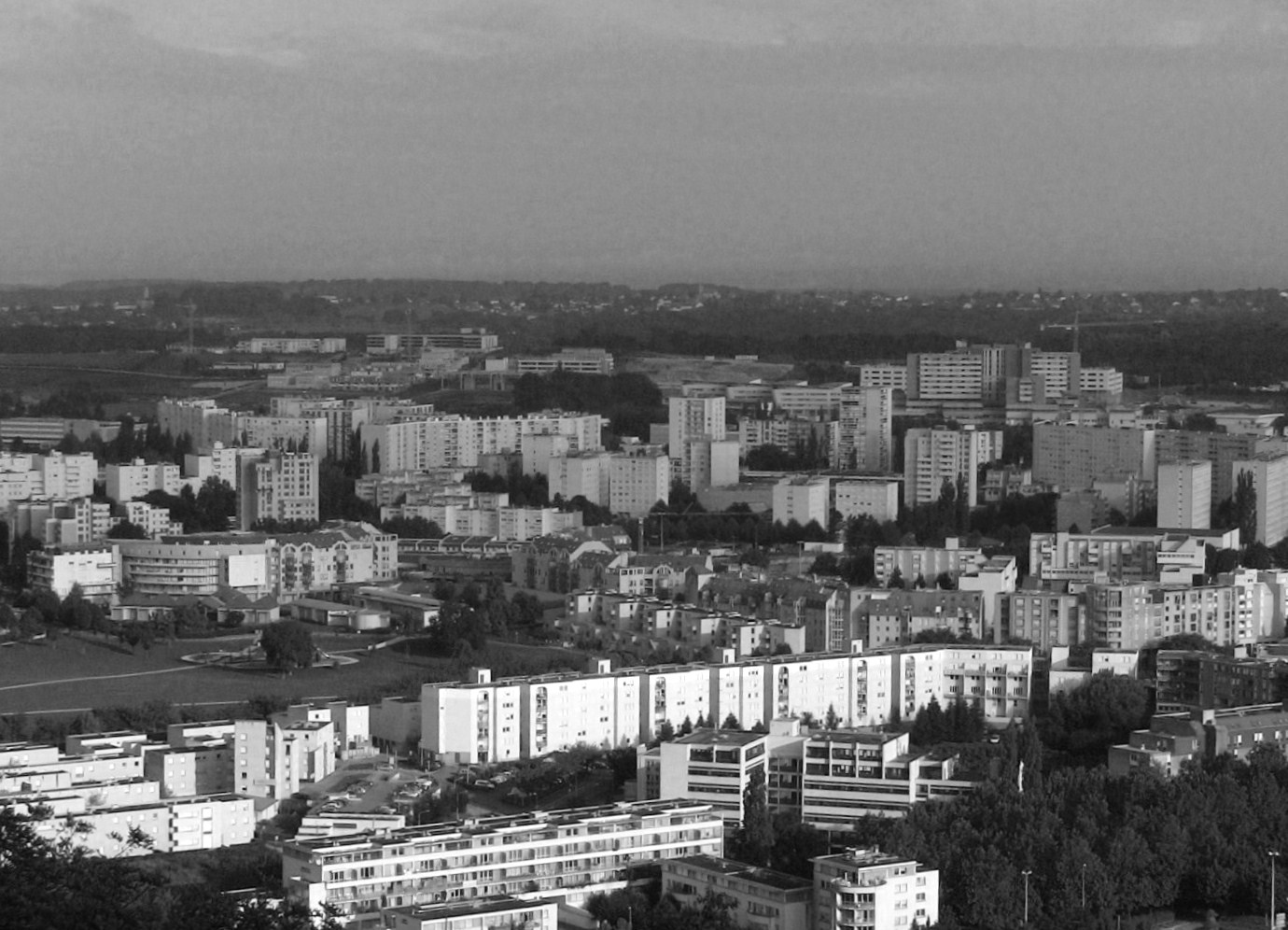
Île-de-France and Cassin sector from the hill of Planoise (in 2009)

== Prehistory to Rome time ==
- Prehistory :
  - In Époisses sector, during an archaeological search a flint was discovered, proving the life in the place 3000 years BC. Three bracelets were also discovered dating to the Iron Age (500 BC), thus one burette dating to the Hellenistic times (4th to 1st century BC). All the objects are on display in the archaeological and artistic museum of Besançon.
- Ancient Rome :
  - A flacon in bronze, dating to the Rome time (500 BC) and a Madonna statue also an oil lamp in terracotta were discovered still in Époisses sector.

== Middle Age ==
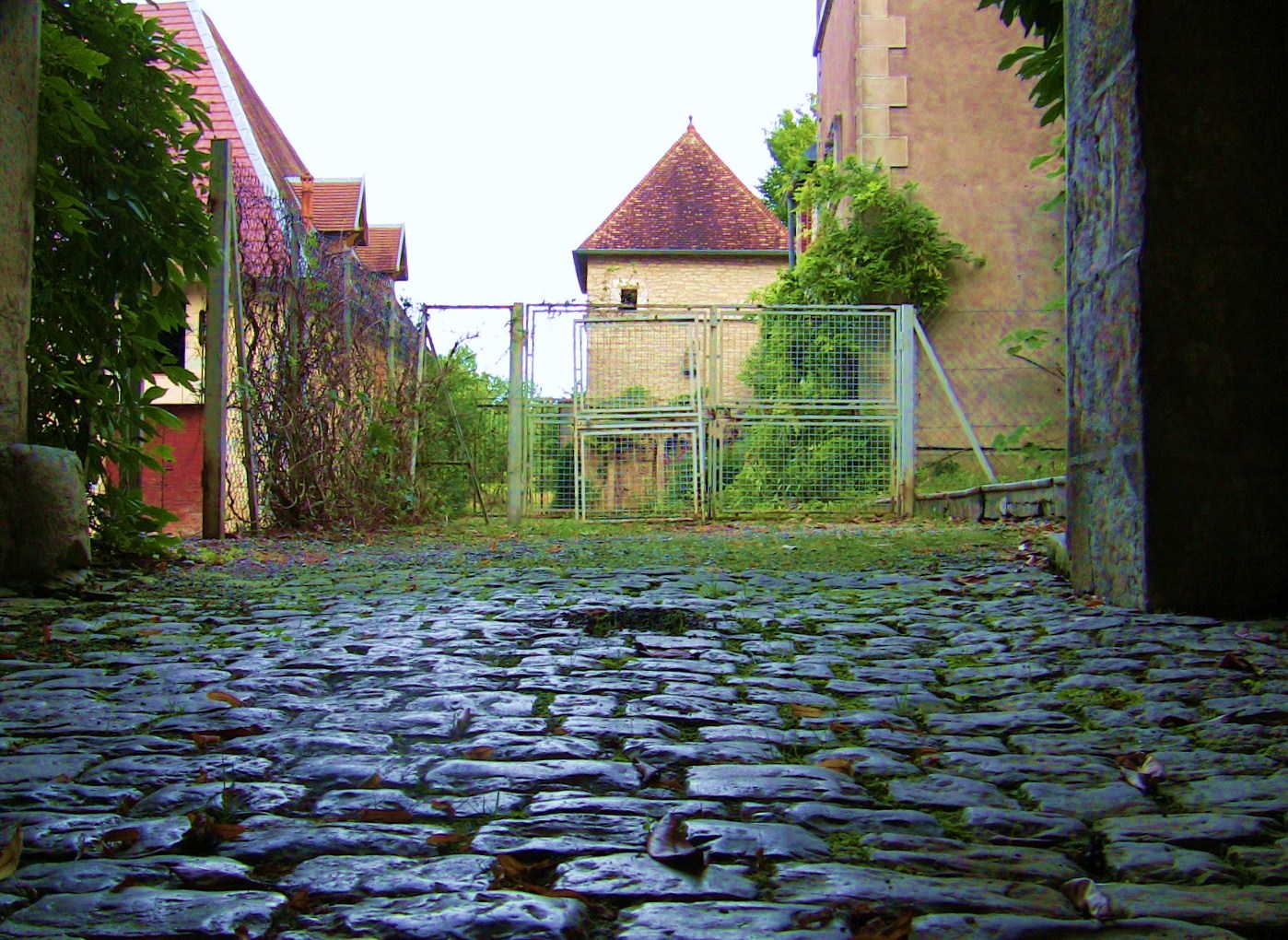
Saint-Laurent castle (entry)

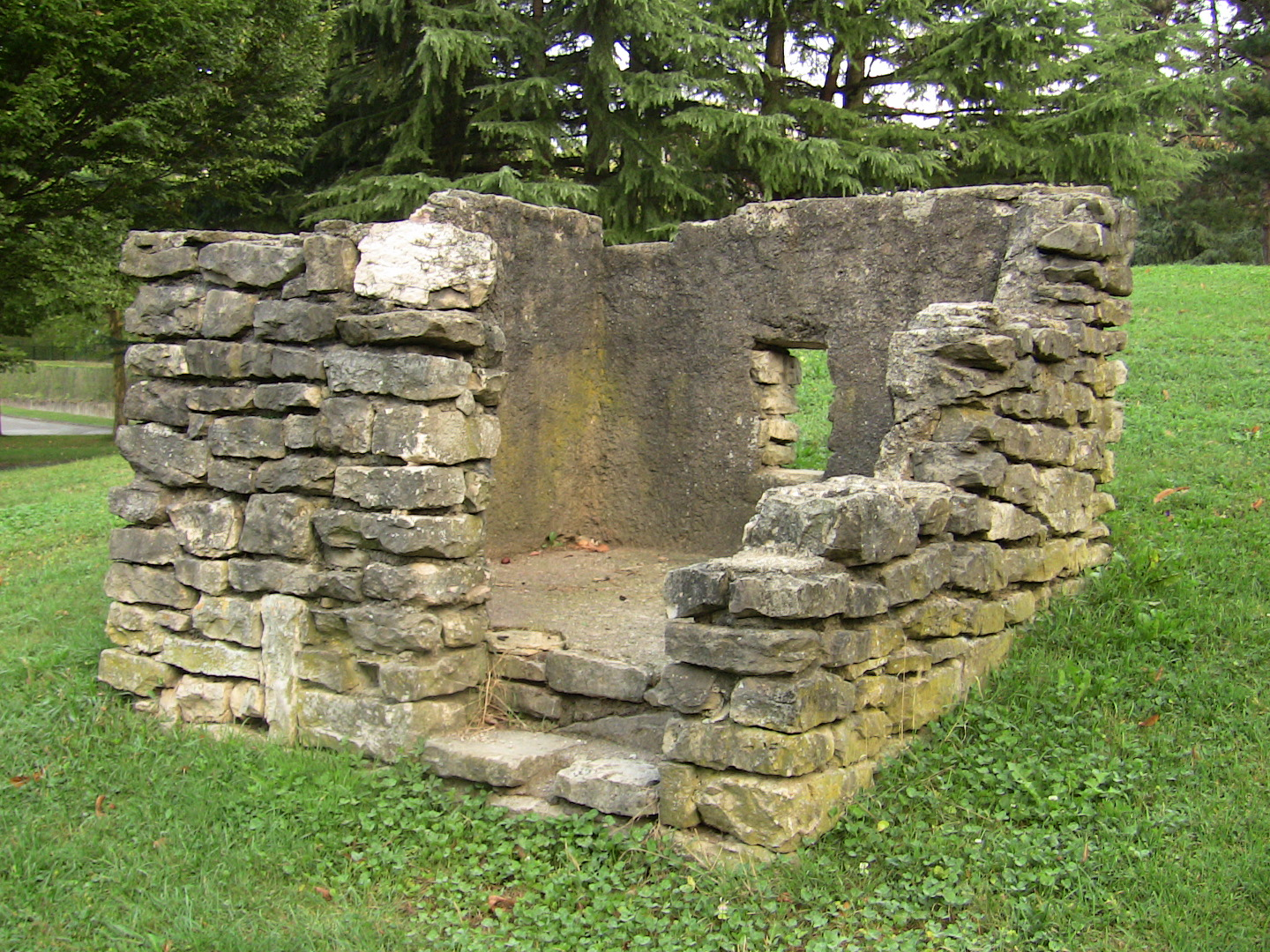
An old house, in Époisses sector

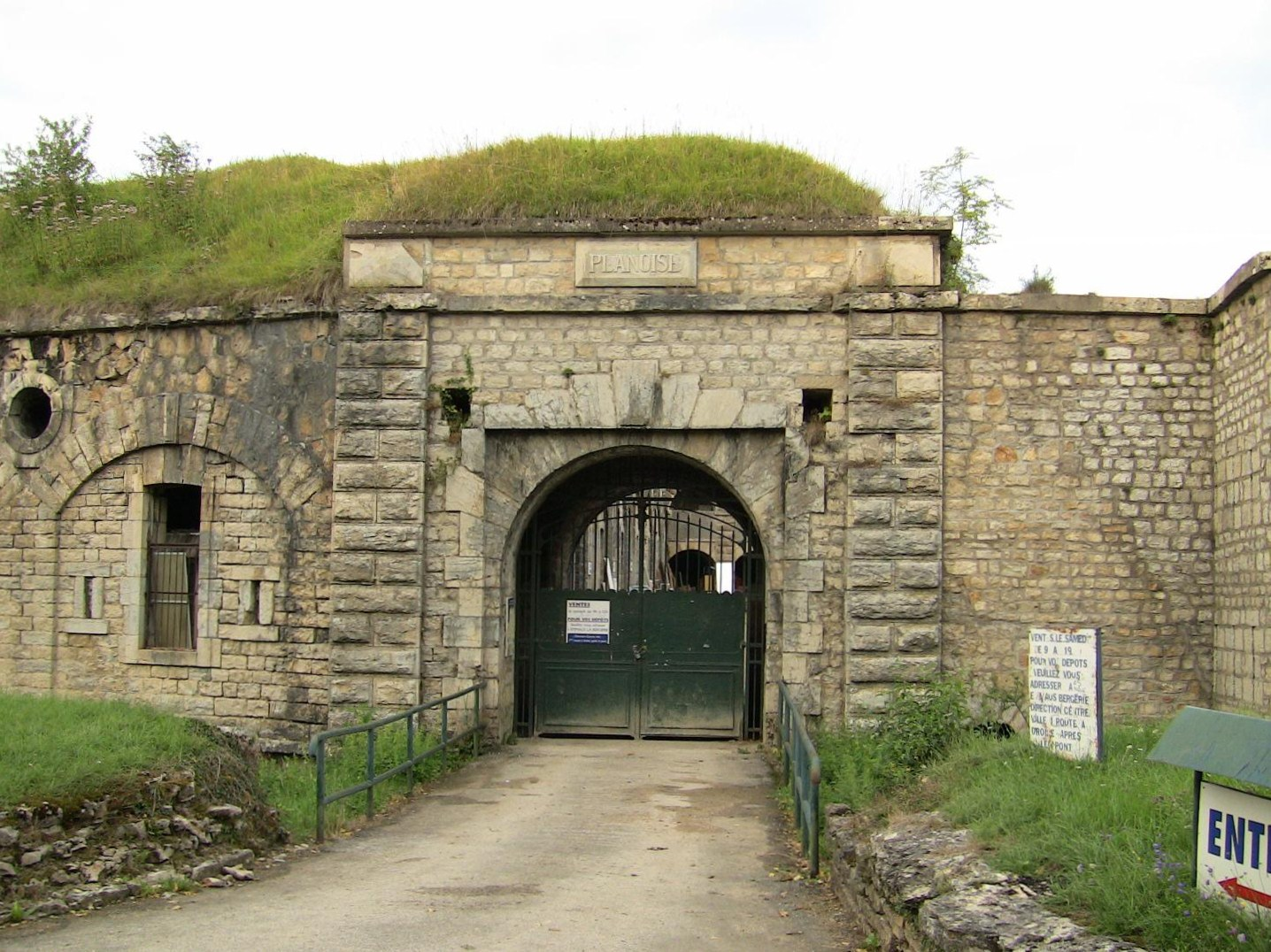
1877: construction of the Fort of Planoise

- 12th century :
  - At the end of the 13th century, the fields of Planoise is included to the Free Imperial City of Besançon, according to Jean de Chalon, earl of Burgundy who fixed the limits of the city (in this time the Franche-Comté region is reattached at the earldom of Burgundy).
- 13th century
  - In August 1336, the duke of Burgundy want to take the city of Besançon after disagreements with the clergy of Franche-Comté. The duke send 9000 riders who posted in the area of Saint-Ferjeux, near Planoise. After many months of defense of the inhabitants of Besançon in the site of Malcombe, the duke abandons the city and grant a truce at Besançon. Many inhabitants of Besançon died during this post, resistant at the riders of the duke. It's because the site was called "combe du malheur" (French for combe of misfortune) and after "Malcombe".
- 15th century
  - In the beginning of the 16th century, the Époisses farm (called also Chambelland farm) is built; it was the oldest building of the sector. This farm behoved at the doctor Chavelet.
  - The name "Planoise" appear for the first time: this toponym designate a wood of platanus. In this time, Planoise was a great forest, and few many inhabitants lived in this sector. The agriculture were the essential activities of the area.

== Modern history ==
- 16th century :
  - In 1500, the clergy of Besançon acquired a big part of the fields of Planoise also a part of the hill of Planoise.
- 17th century :
  - In 1613, construction of Saint-Laurent castle by the viscount Bon Monnier, in Cassin sector. This building have a chapel, a farm, a smithy, a sheepfold...
  - The discharge of "Corandouille" (mean water who trickle) is opening. It receive the wastes of the city of Besançon.

== 19th century to World War I ==
- Beginning of the 19th century :
  - At the beginning of the 19th century, the hamlet experienced a great development : constructions of a lot of farms, construction of a roads connecting Planoise to Besançon : the hamlet is becoming a true village, with 100 to 200 inhabitants.
  - Construction in 1812 of the laundry of Planoise, located in Cassin sector.
  - 14 January 1815, the lord of Liechtenstein want taken Besançon, and his soldiers his posted in the area of Saint-Ferjeux. Marulaz, general of the army of Besançon tried to established a veritable army for resisted at the lord of Liechtenstein. The nearest refueling place was located in the village of Avanne-Aveney, and the general Marulaz must have gone into this township for win. The soldiers of the lord blocked the passage and occupied the place of Planoise. On 20 April 1815, after many months the lord of Liechtenstein abandoned Besançon.
- Middle and end of the 19th century :
  - In 1850, a great road is built connect the place at the city of Besançon. Called "route royale de Moulins à Bâle" (road of Moulins to Bâle), this voice is the future Dole street.
  - In 1877, construction of the Fort of Planoise in the summit of the hill of Planoise.
  - In 1939, just before World War I the school of Châteaufarine is built. It is located near Dole street, between Île-de-France sector and Châteaufarine

== World War I to World War II ==
- World War I :
  - During the World War I, no one particular activities is signalize.
- World War II :
  - During World War II, some farms were destroyed by a military maneuver. One American soldier was killed, and an infirmary was installed provisionally in a farm by the German soldiers, and was taken by the Americans later.

== After the World War II ==
After the World War II, a lot of buildings and infrastructures were destroyed in Besançon, and the demographic boom took place in this time. The municipality had to take a decision: the construction of a new urban zone, Planoise.

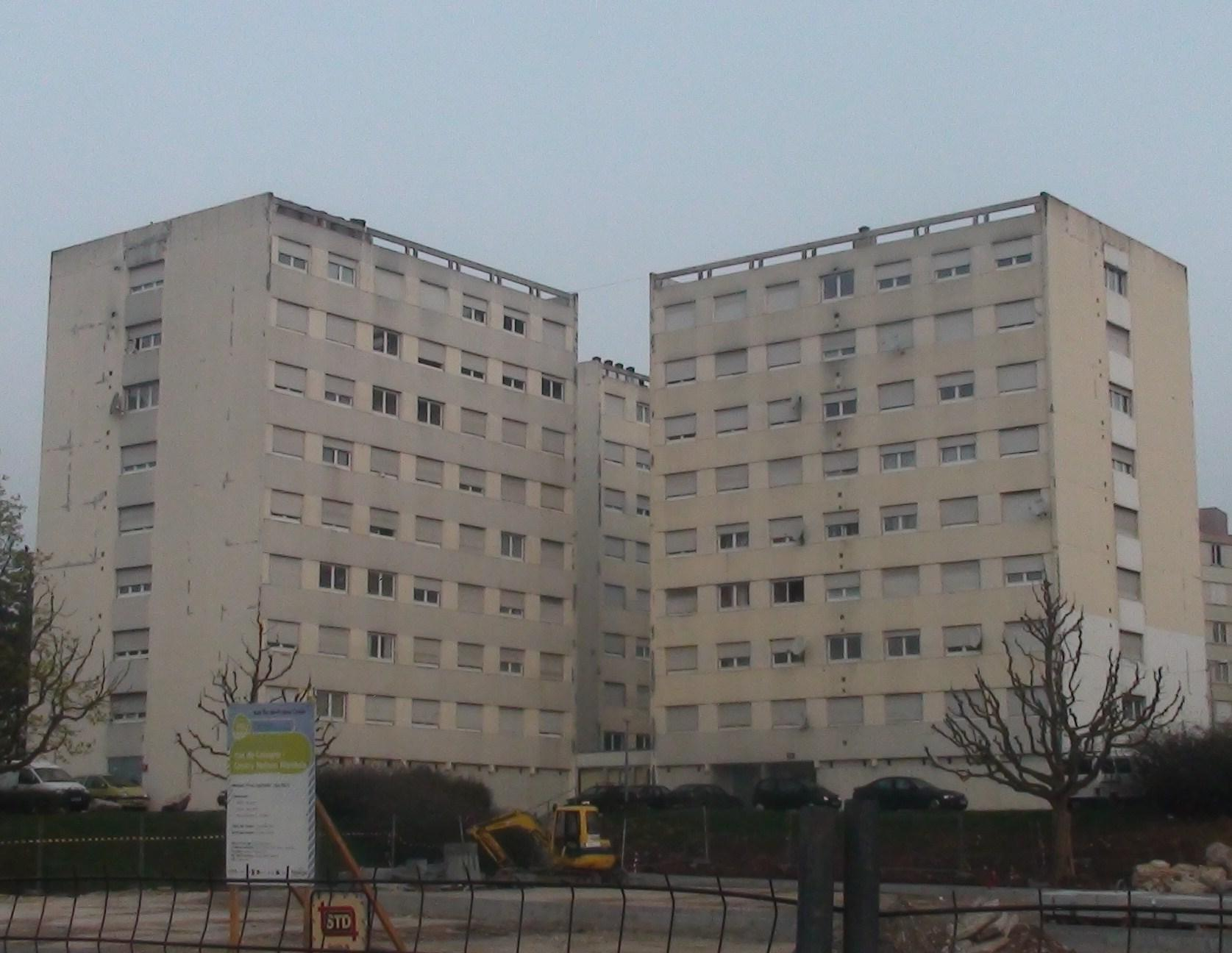
Buildings of Île-de-France sector

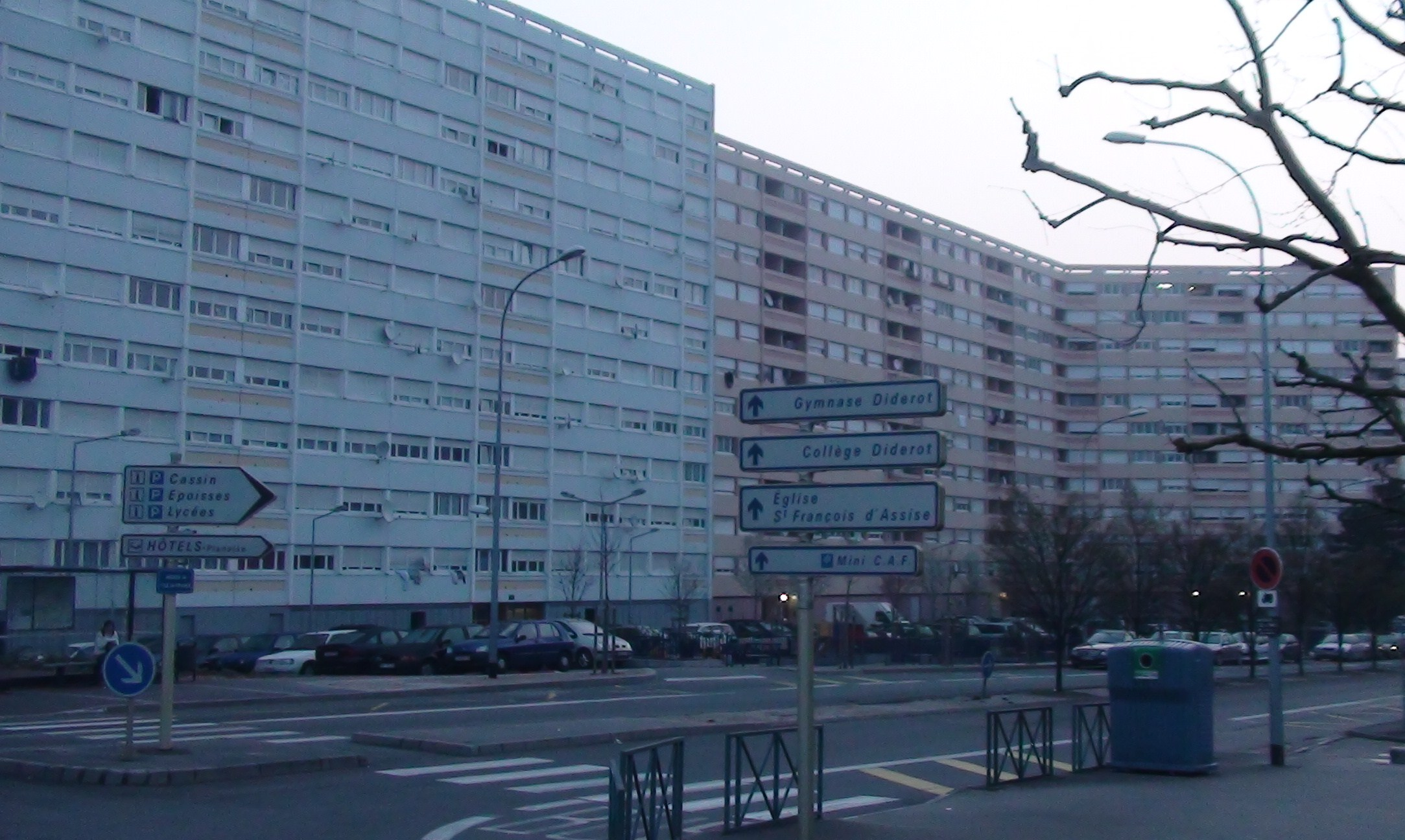
Other building of Île-de-France

Sector	Date of construction	Builder
Flandres-Dunkerque street – Champagne street- Reims street	1968	SAIEMB
Franche-Comté street	1968	SAIEMB et OMHLM
Jean Moulin place – Bourgogne avenue – Dijon street	1968	SAIEMB et OMHLM
Brabant street – Malines street – Bruxelles street – Île-de-France avenue	1970	SCI et ODHLM
Cologne street – Fribourg street	1970	CRL
Fribourg street – Cologne street	1971	OMHLM
Picardie street – Artois street	1972	SCI
Brabant street – Savoie street – Ile-de-France avenue	1972	ODHLM et CRL
Savoie street – Piémont street	1973	OMHLM et ODHLM
Bourgogne avenue – Languedoc street	1976	CRL
Cologne street – Île-de-France avenue – Causses street – Piémont street	1977	OMHLM

- 1950s :
  - 1955, the project of the new urban zone of Planoise begins, requiring that occupants leave his fields. The inhabitants of the place, essenciel a farmers dissatisfied, manifested and blocked the principals voices.
- 1960s :
  - 1960, decision is taken: the new urban zone will be in Planoise. The city of Besançon bought the fields of Planoise for 7,160,886 Francs (€1,091,670).
  - 1962, all old buildings are destroyed or integrated at the new buildings.
  - 1963, 24 July, the newspaper "le comtois" publishes an article about Planoise.
  - 1965, 24 January, firsts real constructions of buildings.
  - 1965, 28 January, L'Est Républicain published an article about Planoise.
  - 1967, 27 October, the first apartments are finished.
  - 1967, Construction of Tristan Bernard high school, in Cassin sector.
  - 1968, the first urban bus serves the area and connects Planoise to the downtown of Besançon.
  - 1968, the first inhabitants move the news HLM.
  - 1968, construction of Diderot college, located in Île-de-France.
  - 1968, construction of the wood boiler near Dole street.
  - 1969, construction of the mall of Époisses.
- 1970s :
  - 1970, destruction of Prabey farm, replaced by a market.
  - 1971, construction of Voltaire college, in Île-de-France sector.
  - 1971, construction of the sector of Micropolis.
  - 1972, construction of Francis of Assisi church.
  - 1975, construction of the mall of Île-de-France.
  - 1976, creation of Malcombe sector.
  - 1978, creation of an industrial zone in Planoise.
- 1980s :
  - 1981, creation of Pari association, for the children's in school difficults.
  - 1983, opening of Jean Minjoz Hospital.
  - 1985, the sector of Cassin is officially recognized.
  - 1985, the newspaper "the Gateway" is published for the first time.
  - 1986, the Departmental archives of Doubs moved in Planoise, in Cassin sector.
  - 1986, foundation of "Planoise Karaté Academy".
  - 1988, opening of Micropolis.
  - 1988, Jean-Louis Fousseret is elected governor of the canton of Besançon-Planoise.
- 1990s :
  - 1993 to 1998, construction of the swimming pool and the ice rink.
  - 1997, installation of South radio in the area.
  - 1998, destruction of Bousserotte farm (called also Bailly farm) for develop the urban park.

== 21st century ==
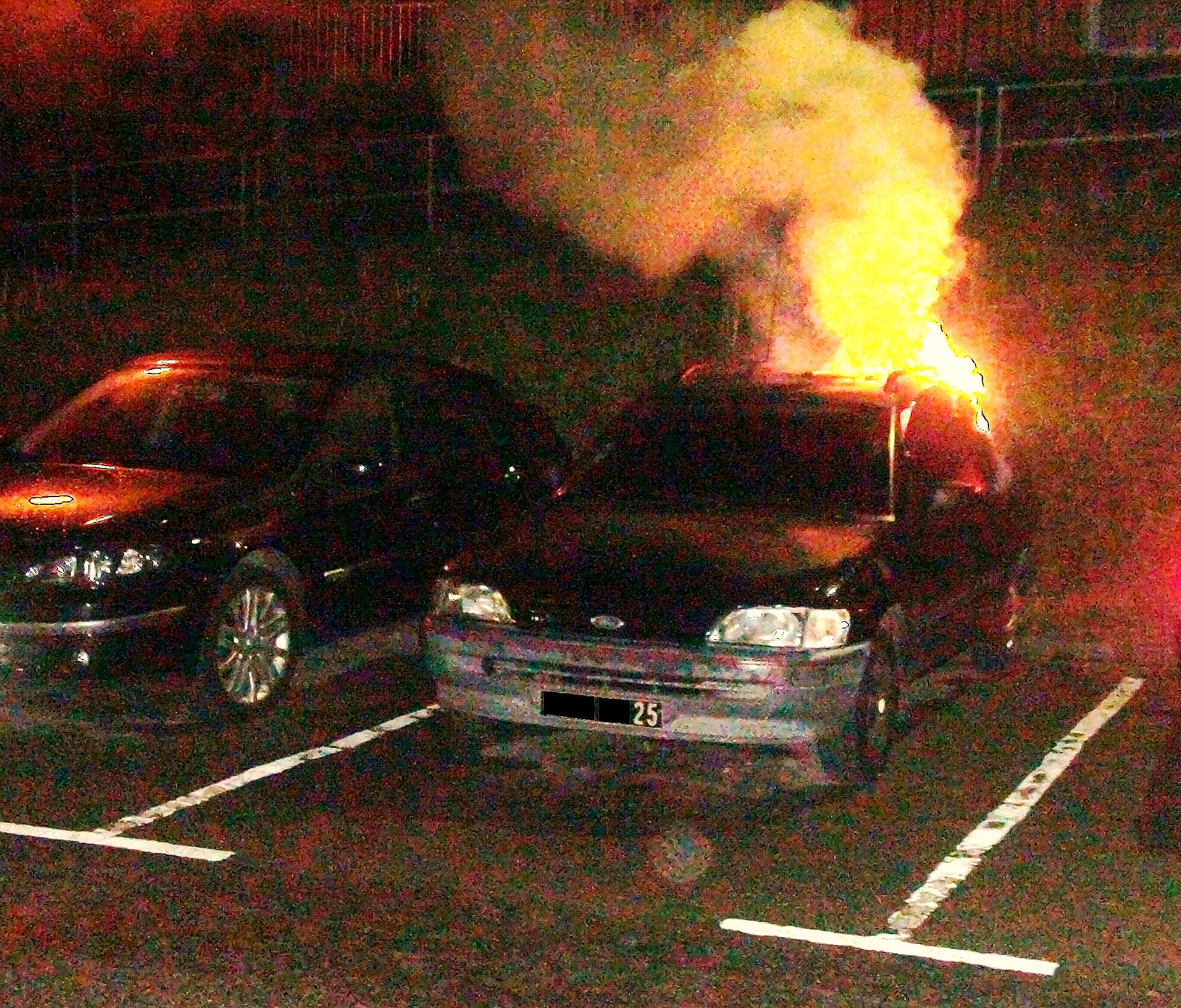
Riots in Planoise (in 2009)

- 2000s
  - 2000, installation of Cépée church in Cassin sector.
  - 2001, 18 March, Danièle Tétu is elected governor of the canton of Besançon-Planoise.
  - 2004, inauguration of the theater of Planoise.
  - 2005, civil unrest in France : riots in Planoise.
  - 2005, 3 November, death of Salah Gaham during the civil unrest in France.
  - 2006, construction of Hauts-de-Chazal sector.
  - 2006, 26 March, inauguration of Salah Gaham place.
  - 2007, the police station is criminally burned.
  - 2007, inauguration of Nelson Mandela center : library, media station and locals for associations.
  - 2008 to 2012, urban renovation of the old buildings
  - 2008, 16 March, Barbara Romagnan is elected governor of the canton of Besançon-Planoise.
  - 2008, inauguration of Al-Fath mosque.
  - 2009, 17 January, hold-up of a bus in Planoise station.
  - 2009, the project of the Tramway of Besançon beginning.
  - 2009, 15 September, aggression of policemen in Cassin sector.

== Project ==
- The Tramway of Besançon will pass in Planoise, in 2014.
- Project of a train station, for 2020.

== See also ==
- Planoise
- Besançon
- Timeline of Besançon
