= Timeline of Besançon =

The following is a timeline of the history of the city of Besançon, France.

== Prior to 19th century ==
- 58 BCE – Julius Caesar occupied Vesontio, the chief town of the Sequani.
- 1st C. CE – Arènes de Besançon (amphitheatre) built on outskirts of La Boucle in Vesontio.
- 175 CE – Porte Noire (Besançon) (arch) built (approximate date).
- 4th C. – Roman Catholic diocese of Besançon active.
- 11th C. – Church of Notre-Dame, Besançon built.
- 1184 – Frederick I made it a free imperial city.
- 1393 – Hôtel de Ville built.
- 1487 – Printing press in operation.
- 1537 – Besançon coat of arms adopted.
- 1540 – Palais Granvelle (Besançon) built by Nicolas Perrenot de Granvelle.
- 1573 – Hôtel de Ville rebuilt.
- 1668 – Citadel of Besançon construction begins.
- 1674 – Siege of Besançon.
- 1676 – Parlement of Besançon established.
- 1678 – Besançon becomes part of France per Treaty of Nijmegen.
- 1694 – Bibliothèque municipale de Besançon (municipal library) founded.
- 1749 – Besançon courthouse rebuilt.
- 1751 – Birth of Marquis de Jouffroy d'Abbans, inventor of steam-navigation.
- 1752 – Besançon Academy of Sciences, Humanities and Arts founded.
- 1766 – St. Madeleine Church built.
- 1786 – St. Peter's Church, Besançon built.
- 1790 – Besançon becomes part of the Doubs souveraineté.
- 1793 – Population: 25,328.
- 1796 – Departmental archives of Doubs established.

== 19th century ==
- 1802 – 26 February: Birth of Victor Hugo, writer.
- 1814 – Besançon besieged by Austrian forces.
- 1818 – Besançon municipal library building opens.
- 1819 – Chamber of Commerce established.
- 1831 – Fort Beauregard built.
- 1833 – Rhone–Rhine Canal opens.
- 1843 – Parc Micaud created.
- 1850 – Rue de Dole laid out.
- 1854 – Fountain installed in the Place de la Révolution (Besançon).
- 1856 – Railway begins operating.
- 1871 – A project of Besançon Commune is engaged.
- 1876 – Population: 54,404.
- 1883 – Le Petit Comtois newspaper in publication.
- 1888 – Dairy College founded.
- 1892 – Besançon-les-Bains built.
- 1893 – Kursaal de Besançon (theatre) opens.
- 1896 – Dépêche Républicaine newspaper begins publication.
- 1897 – Besançon tramway begins operating.^{(fr)}
- 1899 – Société d'histoire naturelle du Doubs established.
- 1900 – Fountain built on the Place Jean-Cornet.^{(fr)}

== 20th century ==
- 1902 – Victor Hugo statue erected on the Promenade Granvelle.^{(fr)}
- 1903 – Eclair Comtois newspaper begins publication.
- 1906 – Population: 56,168.
- 1910 – January 1910 Doubs river flood.
- 1911 – Population: 57,978.
- 1945 – Jean Minjoz becomes mayor.
- 1948 – Besançon International Music Festival begins.
- 1951 – International Besançon Competition for Young Conductors begins.
- 1953 – Battant Bridge rebuilt.
- 1954 – Population: 73,445.
- 1957 – Botanical garden established at Place Leclerc.
- 1960 – Planoise redevelopment process begins.
- 1964 – Gare de Besançon-Viotte rebuilt.
- 1968 – Population: 113,220.
- 1970 – Besançon courthouse attack.
- 1972
  - Centre dramatique national Besançon Franche-Comté established.
  - Francis of Assisi Church built.
- 1975 – Population: 120,315.
- 1977 – Robert Schwint becomes mayor.
- 1983 – Jean Minjoz Hospital opens.
- 1994 – Sunna Mosque, Besançon established.^{(fr)}

== 21st century ==
- 2001 – Jean-Louis Fousseret becomes mayor.
- 2002 – Musée du Temps de Besançon opens.
- 2005 – 3 November: 2005 Planoise Forum fire.
- 2010 – 13 December: School hostage crisis.
- 2011 – Population: 115,879.
- 2014 – 30 August: commissioning of the Besançon tramway.
- 2015 – December: Bourgogne-Franche-Comté regional election, 2015 held.
- 2016 – Besançon becomes part of the Bourgogne-Franche-Comté region.
- 2001 – Anne Vignot becomes mayor.

== See also ==
- Besançon history
- History of Besançon
- Chronology of Planoise, a neighborhood in Besançon
- Other names of Besançon e.g. Bisanz, Vesontio
- List of mayors of Besançon
- List of heritage sites in Besançon
- History of Doubs department
- History of Franche-Comté region
- Arenas of Besançon

other cities in the Bourgogne-Franche-Comté region

- Timeline of Dijon

== Bibliography ==
=== in English ===
- "Besançon", Northern France (4th ed.), Leipzig: Karl Baedeker, 1905, hdl:2027/hvd.hnny8y, OCLC 01820283
- "Besançon" . Encyclopædia Britannica. Vol. 3 (11th ed.). 1910. pp. 819–820.

=== in French ===
- L'Indicateur de Besançon: ou Almanach administratif, industriel et commercial (in French). Ch. Deis. 1837.
- Alexandre Guénard (1860). Besançon: description historique des monuments et établissements publics (in French). Baudin.
- Auguste Castan [in French] (1880). Besançon et ses environs (in French). Marion.
- "Besancon". Le Jura. À la France: sites et monuments (in French). Paris: Touring-Club de France. 1905. OCLC 457600236.
- "Besançon". Bourgogne, Morvan, Nivernais, Lyonnais. Guides Joanne (in French). 1907. hdl:2027/uc1.$b192332.
- Claude Fohlen [in French] (1964). Histoire de Besançon (in French). Nouvelle Librairie de France.
