= Gabriel Plançon =

French Resistance fighter

- Born: July 10, 1916; Besançon, France
- Died: September 14, 1943 (aged 27); Besançon
- Other name: Bibi
- Occupation: Typist
- Movement: French Resistance
- Honours: Legion of Honour; Croix de Guerre 1939–1945; Resistance Medal; Street named after him Commemorative plaque

Gabriel Plançon was a French Resistance fighter born in Besançon on July 10, 1916, and shot dead by German occupying forces in the same town on September 14, 1943. Nicknamed Bibi, he led a "classic" existence, divided between his family, his mechanical work on typewriters and his artistic and cultural hobbies. However, his routine was disrupted when he was posted to the air force during World War II. After being captured and escaping, he returned to a country under Nazi domination. He joined the French Resistance, using his skills and equipment to convince the population to fight, provide false papers and hide his companions, later becoming leader of the local Francs-tireurs et partisans movement, in conjunction with the Guy Mocquet group.

At the peak of his fight, he is said to have organized, with the help of British allies, the bombing of Besançon in 1943, which cost the lives of some 50 people and destroyed the Comtois capital's main railway station and other infrastructure. He planned to carry out a final bomb attack targeting the quarters of a German military police unit, before fleeing to London, but was denounced by a traitor. During his arrest, he was seriously wounded while trying to escape, and died of his injuries. Decades after the war, the French authorities paid tribute to him, awarding him several posthumous titles, as well as a commemorative plaque and a street in his name.

== Childhood and adulthood ==
Gabriel Plançon, son of Jules Irénée known as René (1891-1959) and Jeanne Marie Angèle Georgette Caire (1891-1974), was born on July 10, 1916 in Besançon, a town in the Franche-Comté region of France, during, World War I. Nevertheless, the city was not involved in the conflict, and his father was discharged from the army, giving Gabriel, nicknamed Bibi at the time, a "normal" life. His parents owned property in the Tilleroyes district to the west of the city, where he grew up. He attended the Arsenal elementary school, then scouted during 1928 as a patrol scout with the Éclaireurs de France, before attending the École nationale d'horlogerie (National Watchmaking School), now the Lycée Jules-Haag.

At the age of 15, he gave up his watchmaking studies, which did not interest him, and lived in the family home, entertaining many friends, most of them from the worlds of art and culture. A lover of nature and animals, he planted an Atlas Cedar in the vicinity of his house, a tree that still stands on the premises today. In 1931, his little sister Janine, nicknamed Nino, was born, and Gabriel, despite some initial emotional misgivings towards her, ended up showing great brotherly love and becoming a role model for her. Later, he decided to work as a typist in the family workshop, specializing in the sale and repair of typewriters. At the same time, he became a self-taught intellectual, with a particular interest in literature, including a great deal of poetry.

He also took an interest in aviation, passing his pilot's license and taking up parachuting. His political awareness developed, and as a young adult, he began militating in the city's socialist circles with comrades such as Jean Minjoz, Gilbert Bourquin and Henri Chapatte. His thinking was humanist, and he advocated bringing people together and teaching Esperanto to the whole world. In addition to his professional and political activities, Bibi made it a point of honor to restore and improve the house where he was born. As the situation in Europe deteriorated, he worried about a possible new war, and feared that his property would be bombed because the work he had begun could be perceived as suspicious.

== War and Resistance ==
In 1939, World War II was declared. Gabriel Plançon was mobilized and assigned to the air force, first in Montpellier, then at the Valence headquarters in the Drôme region. He was taken prisoner, but escaped to Istres with two companions. He told them, "We're useless here, we have to go back to Besançon and join a Resistance group". Despite his precarious financial situation and the risks involved, he managed to return to the Comtois capital, where he intended to fight against the occupation as part of a faction. On February 3, 1941, he married Marguerite Marsoudet (1909-1967), a hairdresser seven years his senior, divorced with two children to support; although he loved her passionately, he did not wish to have any more children, believing that his Resistance activities would lead to his death.

In his idea of struggle, he sought out a resistance group; but the only group in the city at the time was the Communist Party, a movement to which Bibi was not ideologically close, but which he joined anyways. In fact, the Resistance did not fully take root in Besançon until 1942, with genuine attacks such as the one on the Hôtel de Paris and the Frontbuchhandlung bookshop (place du Huit septembre), both the work of the Valmy group. Thus, the only real actions carried out beforehand were those of this party, such as graffiti writing, flyer distribution or the organization of a protest at the war memorial on November 11, 1941. After being demobilized, he resumed his work as a mechanic to survive in these precarious conditions and help his fellow soldiers. After the Francs-tireurs et partisans group was created and set up in Besançon, Plançon became its local leader, working with the Guy Mocquet group and Abbot Georges Martin, vicar in the Saint-Ferjeux district, to organize resistance in the region, particularly in Besançon and Pontarlier. He produced numerous leaflets against the Nazis and the Vichy government, and urged people to join the Resistance. He also sold posters to benefit the families of those shot and deported in the Doubs region.

With the help of Henri Chapatte, his clandestine printing works also enabled him to make forged identity cards. He hid and supported the survivors of the Guy Mocquet group, to whom he was very close, at his home and in another house in the hamlet of Plaisir-Fontaine, near Ornans. He then took on an assumed name, Dussaut, and stepped up his fight by printing numerous leaflets, notably against the Service du travail obligatoire. After the arrest of many people in the region, including many members of the Guy Mocquet group, he even considered helping the 16 Resistance fighters sentenced to death in Besançon to escape, but did not have the time to carry out this project, as the executions took place on September 26, 1943. On the night of July 16–17, 1943, the city of Besançon was bombed at several points, and Bibi decided to see the damage with her father and younger sister. They walked towards the Viotte train station, but the sight of a severed hand lying on the sidewalk prompted Gabriel to take Janine home. It was the only bombing the town had ever seen, and although the sirens sounded, their daily use no longer concerned the inhabitants.

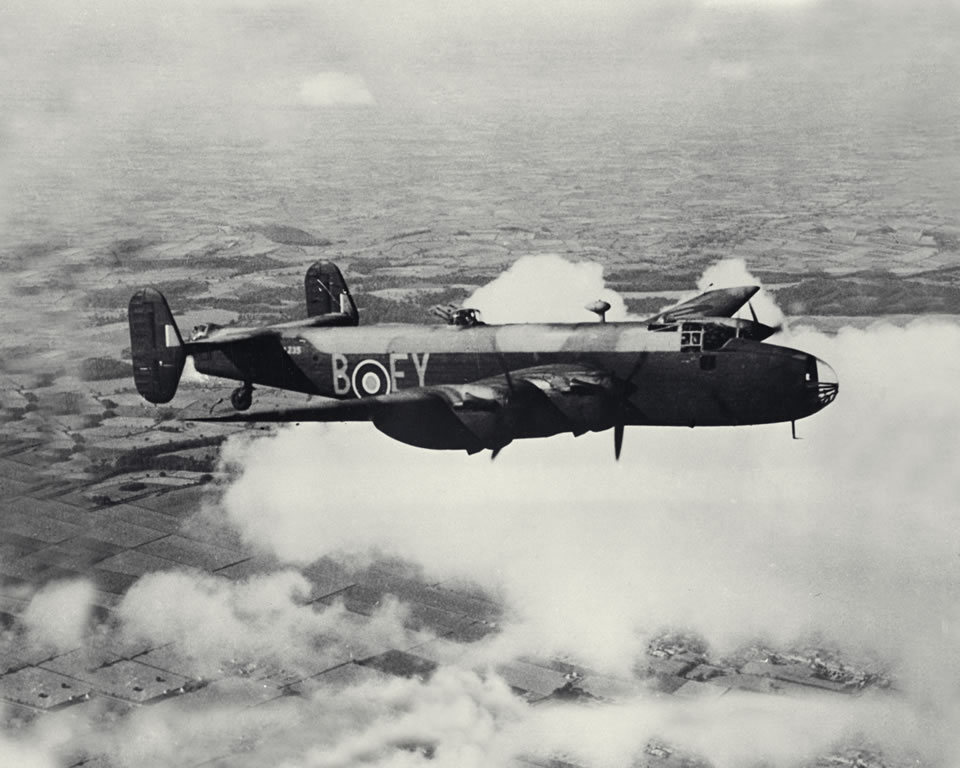
A Halifax bomber.

During the night, 165 Halifax Pathfinder bombers took off from south-west England, targeting the Peugeot factories at Sochaux. The town of Besançon was chosen as an alternative target, to deceive the German night fighters. At around 1 a.m. local time, a scout plane collided with a German fighter (Dornier 217-J), resulting in an exchange of fire. The English Halifax was then hit by the German Dornier, before the former crashed into the Besançon-Viotte railway station. Fifteen Halifaxes then bombed Besançon in dispersed order, killing around fifty people, many of them civilians. The Bregille funicular was also bombed by a plane that had dropped its bombs too early, and it later emerged that nine of these bombers thought they had destroyed the Peugeot factories in Sochaux. A witness at the scene saw flashes of lightning as the planes bombed the town, evidence of the use of flash bombs to take photos of the target.

Gabriel, who had been involved in a number of sabotages on the rail network, might have been the instigator of this attack. In fact, he was behind a plan to destroy the city's most important barracks with London resistance fighters, but as the city had far too many barracks due to its rich military past, the Nazi-controlled station was chosen. In all, the operation resulted in some 50 deaths, 40 seriously injured and 100 lightly wounded civilians. In material terms, the station, several factories and buildings were totally destroyed. Denunciations were rife in these times of war, and in the wake of this attack, he felt his life was in danger; Bibi then tried to organize an escape to London, one of the last free cities in Europe, after one last action.

== Latest attack and death ==
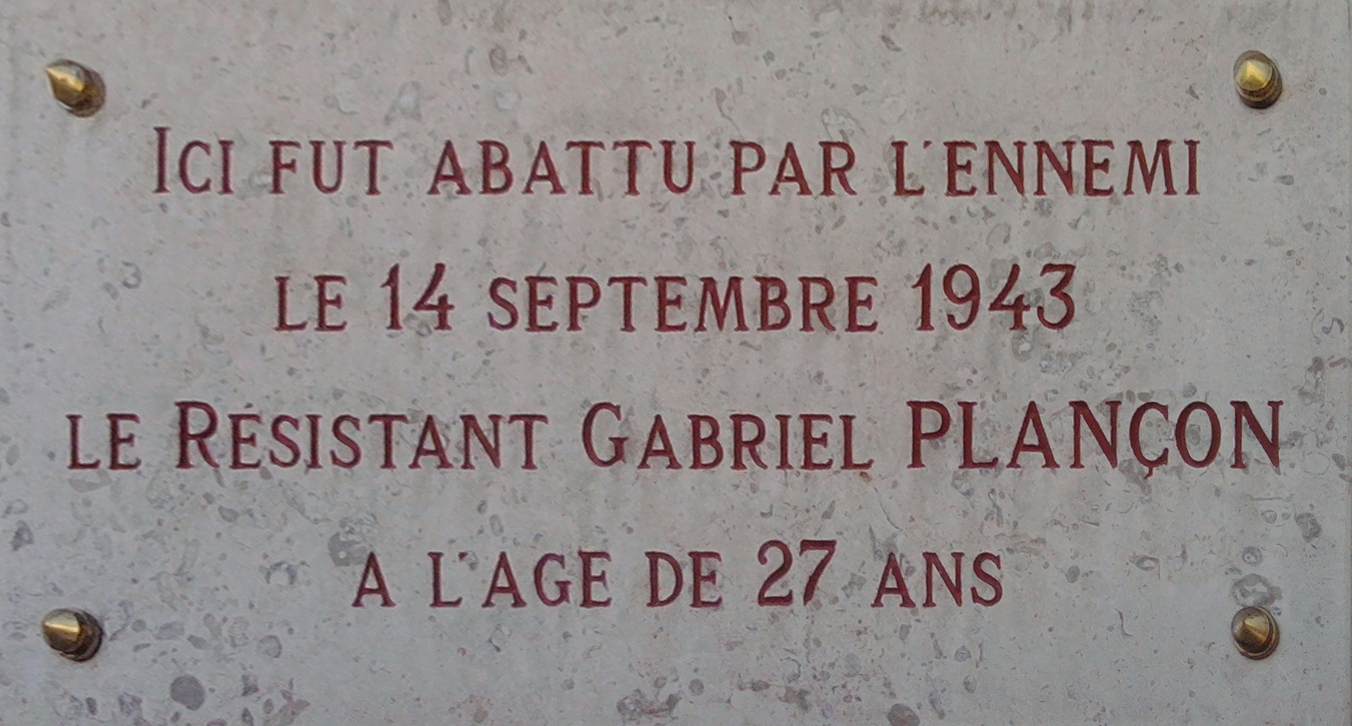
Commemorative plaque on the house where Gabriel Plançon was murdered.

On September 13, 1943, the Guy Mocquet group delivered a bomb to the resistance fighters supporting Gabriel, which was to be used to blow up a pro-German bookshop on Grande rue, used as a recruitment office for the Legion of French Volunteers Against Bolshevism. In addition to its clearly defined objective, this operation was intended to test the honesty of one of the network's most dubious members, Robert Guyon. But Guyon denounced his accomplices to the Feldgendarmerie, and in return was sentenced to 20 years' hard labor, 20 years' residency ban and life imprisonment for national degradation, a decision handed down by the Doubs Court of Justice on August 8, 1945. Gabriel, knowing he was in danger, tried to reach Great Britain via Spain, but all the members of the Guy Mocquet group, except Robert Opériol who managed to elude the spies, were arrested and deported. Among them, Jacques Martin, in charge of the mail service in the Jura mountains, was deported to the Dachau concentration camp, where he died on February 20, 1945; his wife Marie-Rose Martin was deported to Mauthausen and then to Ravensbrück, where she was miraculously liberated on April 25, 1945; Jean Fournier, a trainee inspector, died in Flossenbürg on March 31, 1945.

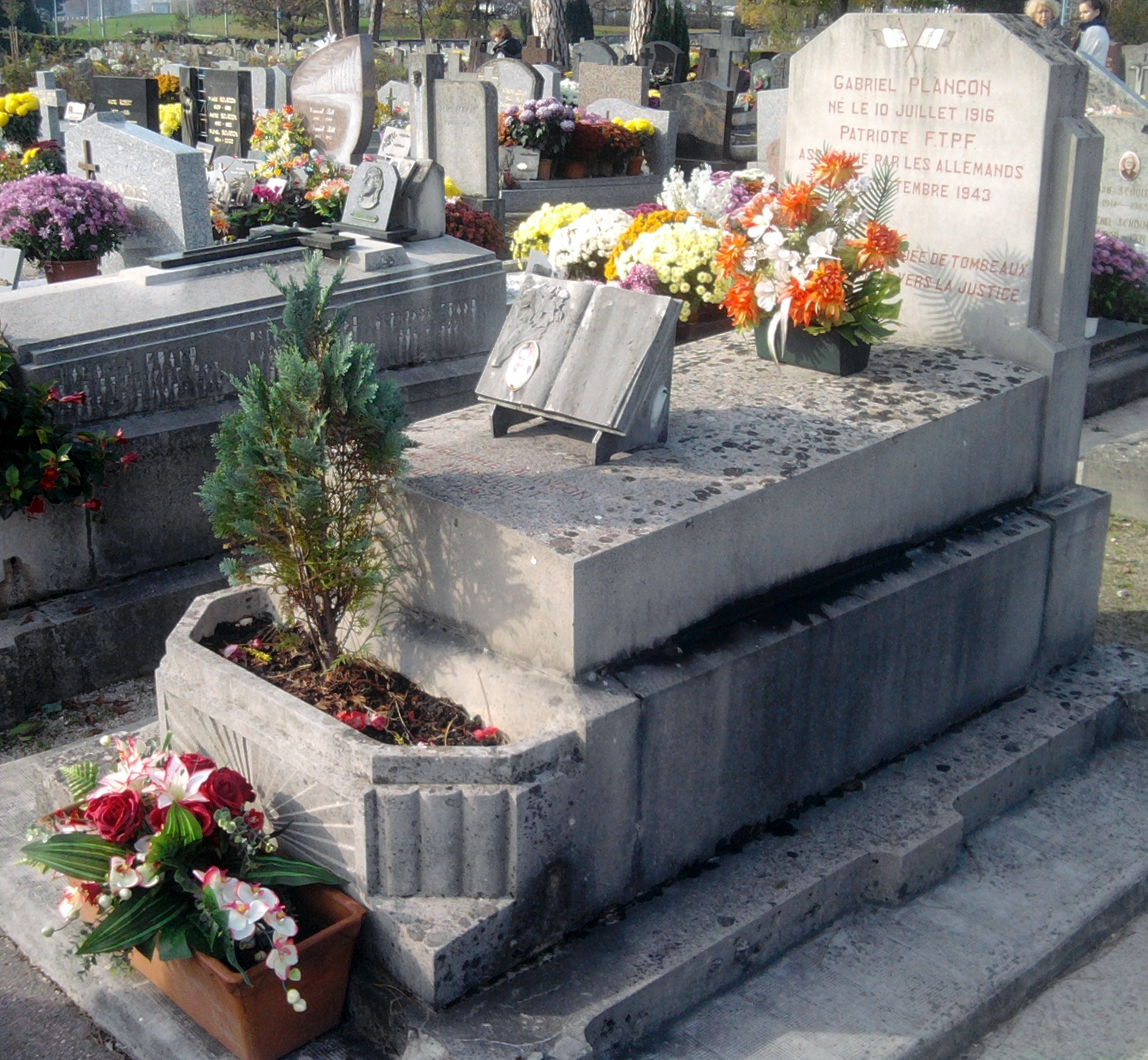
Tomb of Gabriel Plançon and his wife Marguerite.

As for Gabriel Plançon, the Nazis went to look for him at his home, Place Risler, on the night of July 10, 1943, at 1:45 am. They knocked on the door and immediately demanded Gabriel's surrender, but his wife huffily replied that he was absent. Meanwhile, Bibi attempted to escape through a back window by climbing onto a pile of wood, but the pile unraveled and made a rustling noise. Soldiers stationed nearby heard the noise, identified Gabriel and shot him. Severely wounded by a musket ball in the stomach, he groaned for some twenty minutes before the authorities took him to Hôpital Saint-Jacques, while others searched the apartment. Marguerite Plançon and one of her daughters were subsequently taken away, before being released shortly afterwards. He died at 6 a.m. during a last-chance operation, and his family was allowed to see his remains. His burial took place a few days later in the Saint-Ferjeux cemetery, and was attended in silence by a huge crowd. There were no tombstones, no services, no special gatherings. However, several of his friends, including Henri Chapatte and Gilbert Mourquin, entered the cemetery the following night and laid a wreath on Gabriel's grave, bearing the words "To our friend, murdered by the Germans".

== Tributes ==
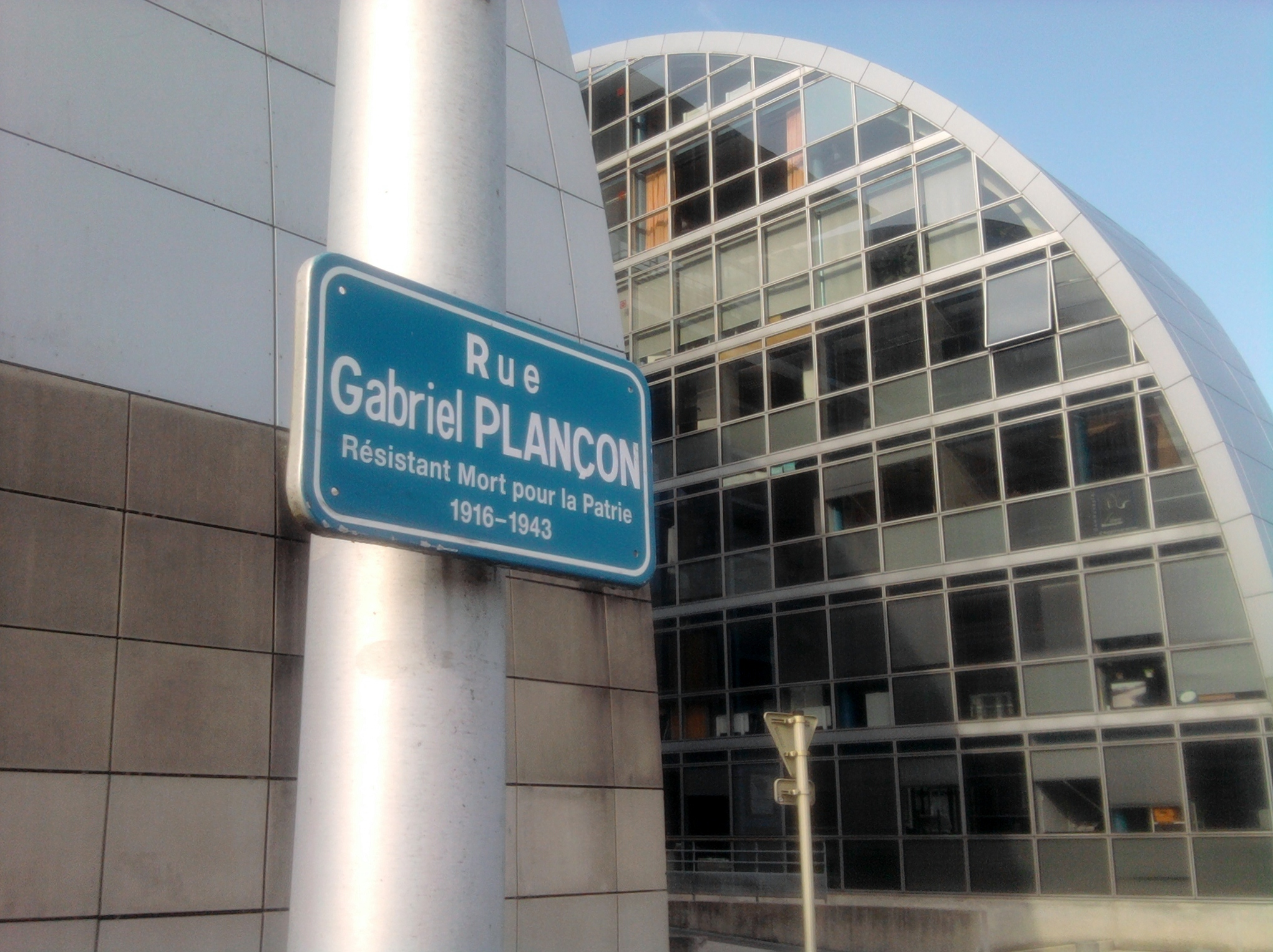
Rue Gabriel Plançon (Gabriel Plançon street).

The grave of Gabriel and his wife, located in the Saint-Ferjeux cemetery (alley B), was adorned with a stone stele bearing the inscriptions "Gabriel Plançon, born July 10, 1916, FTPT patriot, murdered by the Germans on September 14, 1943, the road is lined with graves, but it leads to Justice". The historian Jean Tyrode asked Mayor Robert Schwint to name a street in the town after this character, which was done when a road linking the Pont Canot and Boulevard Charles de Gaulle was named in his honor, with the words "Resistance fighter who died for the Fatherland". Also on Jean Tyrode's initiative, a commemorative plaque was affixed to the wall of the building in which he was mortally wounded in 1995, at Place Risler, noting "Here was shot down by the enemy the Resistance fighter Gabriel Plançon, aged 27", in the presence of Robert Schwint, the Doubs deputy, Robert Opériol, and several other officials and local residents. He was posthumously awarded the Legion of Honor, the Croix de Guerre 1939-1945 and the Resistance Medal. Finally, a book entitled "Gabriel Plançon, résistant assassiné à Besançon" (Gabriel Plançon, Resistance fighter murdered in Besançon), authored by his sister Janine, was published in 2011.

== See also ==
- Henri Fertet
- Timeline of Besançon
- Museum of the Resistance and Deportation
