= Jean Minjoz Hospital =

- City of Besançon
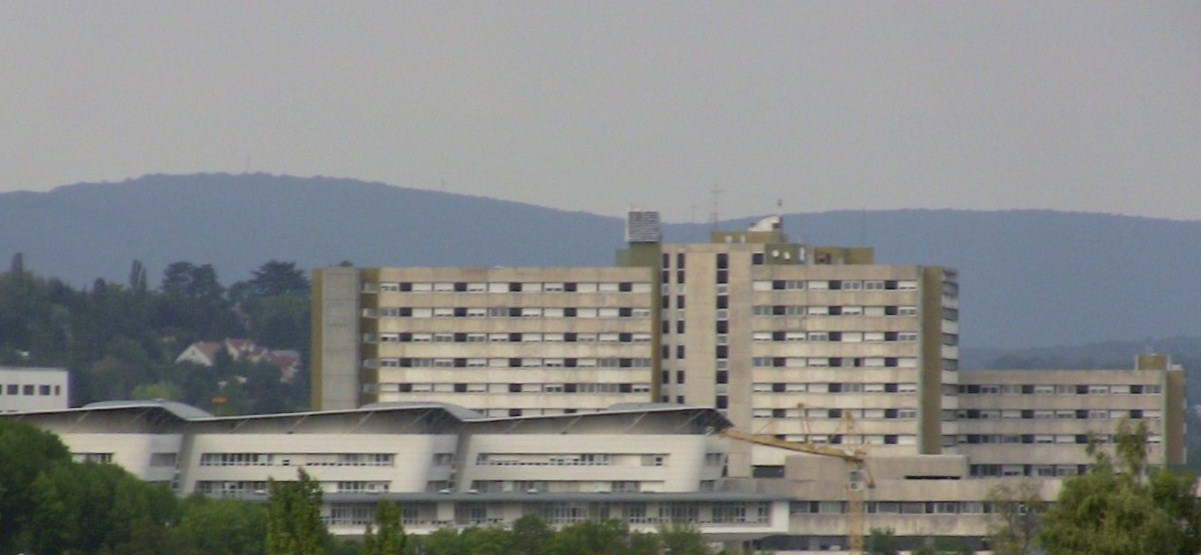
- View from Planoise

Geography
- Location: Besançon, Bourgogne-Franche-Comté, France
- Coordinates: 47.2257°N 5.96323°E

Organisation
- Type: Teaching hospital (University hospital center)
- Patron: Jean Minjoz

History
- Constructed: 1980s
- Opened: 1983

Links
- Website: www.chu-besancon.fr
- Lists: Hospitals in France

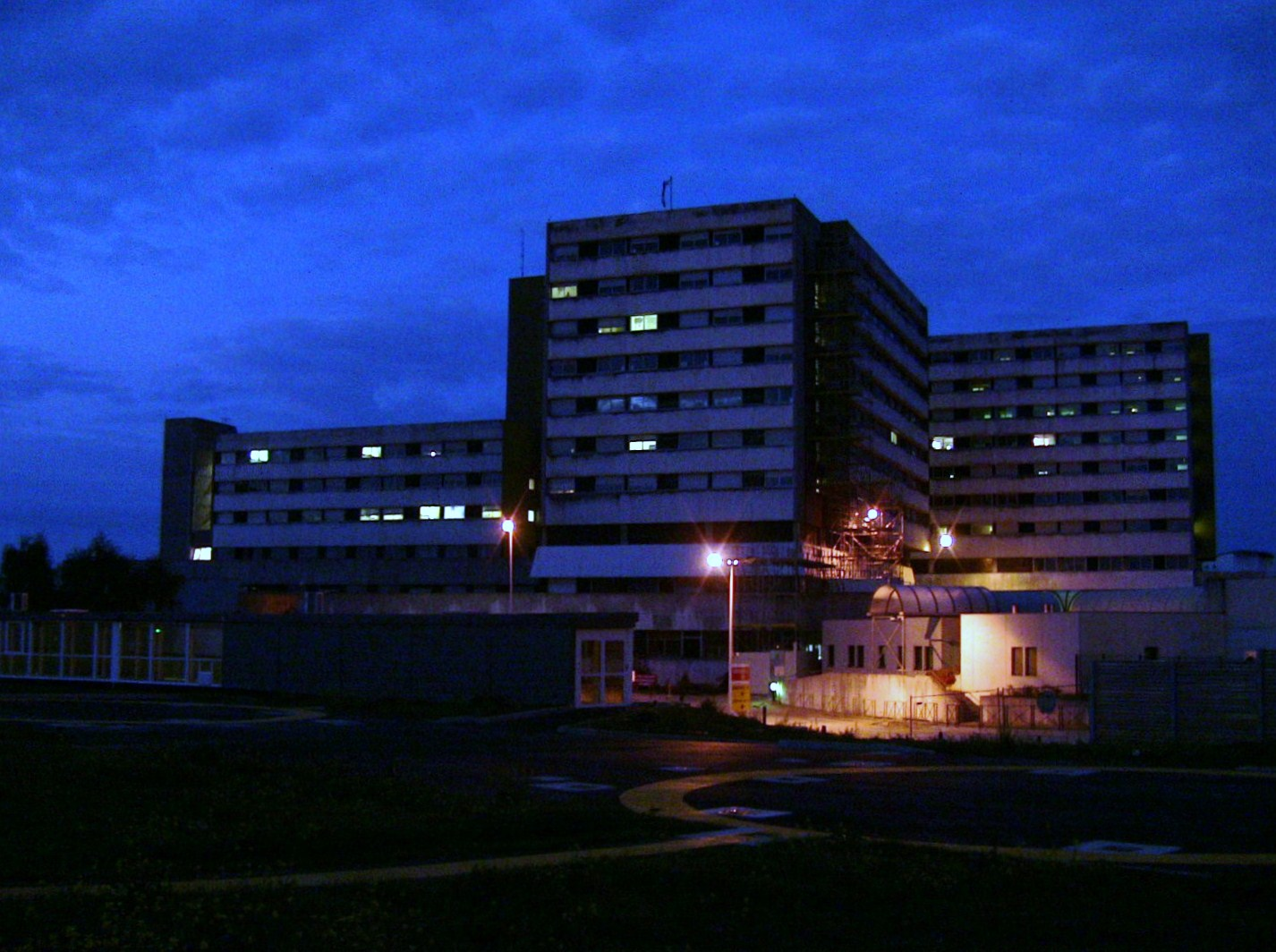
The building, by night

The Jean Minjoz Hospital is a large hospital in Besançon in the French region of Bourgogne-Franche-Comté. It is located in Planoise in the west of the city.

== History ==
The hospital was built in 1980s near Rue de Dole, one of the city's main arteries, and includes a heliport. It was named after a former mayor of Besançon, Jean Minjoz (1904–1987) and was opened in 1983.
