= Malcombe =

Sportive area in Besançon, France

Coordinates: 47.2217°N 5.98366°E

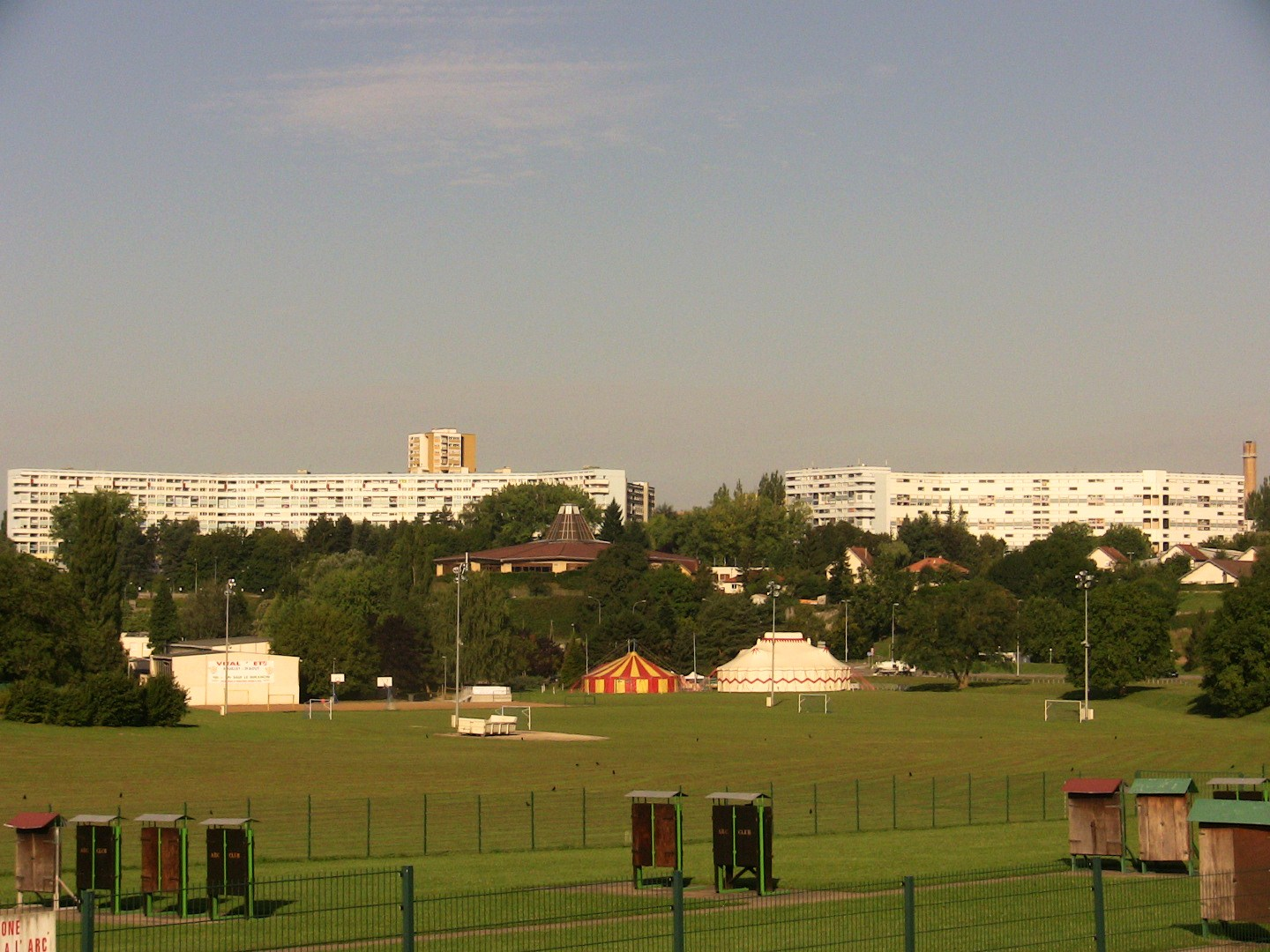
Malcombe area

Malcombe is a recreational sports area located west of Besançon, in France. The sector is a part of the neighborhood of Planoise.

== History ==
In August 1336, the duke of Burgundy wanted to lay siege to the city of Besançon after disagreeing with the clergy of Franche-Comté. The duke sent 9,000 riders who were posted in the area of Saint-Ferjeux, near Planoise. After the inhabitants of Besançon defended their city for many months at the site of the Malcombe, the duke abandoned his cause and left the city and made a truce with Besançon. Hundreds of Besançon inhabitants were killed and buried at the site of the battle. This is why the site was called "combe du malheur" (Which is French for "valley of misfortune") and later became the "Malcombe".

In 1976, the municipality of Besançon decided to create a recreational sports area at this site for a new neighborhood called Planoise. Three football fields, a beach volleyball field, a volleyball field, a climb room, and an archery field were built.

== See also ==
- Planoise
- Besançon

== Sources ==
- Bevalot, René (1995). Planoise-vous connaissez?: à propos d'un quartier de Besançon en Franche-Comté (in French). Besançon: René Bevalot. OCLC 51244307.
