= County of Varais =

French former county in Burgundy

- Burgundian pagis in the 9th century
- Status: Count * An integral part of the Kingdom of Burgundy
- Capital: Baume-les-Dames

Establishment
  - Creation of the county by the Burgundians: 5th century
  - Creation and merger with the County of Burgundy: 982

The County of Varais (French: comté de Varais), also known as the County of Warasch (comitatu Guaraschensi in Latin sources), broadly corresponded to the present-day arrondissement of Pontarlier in the department of Doubs, France. It extended from Rougemont to Poligny on a north–south axis, and from the Jura mountain range to the banks of the Doubs River, on the east to west axis. Its administrative center was Baume-les-Nones.

== Etymology ==
The etymology of the term Warasch has been the subject of several interpretations. According to Droz, it derives from the German Wahren, meaning “to guard.” Gingins proposes a different origin, linking the term to Varais or Waresgau. He traces Pagus Varascorum to Varasques, Warhes, or Wahres man, capite civili praediti, designations referring to a district occupied by Burgundian soldiers who had been granted land, and whose heads of households possessed hereditary property along with full civil and political rights. Bullet derives the word from Var, meaning “mountain,” and Ac or Asc, meaning “inhabitants.”

== Origin of the county ==
The county was established following the arrival of the Burgundians in Sequania during the 5th century. It constituted one of the five territorial components of historical Franche-Comté, alongside the counties of Scoding (or Escuens), Amaous, Port, and the city of Besançon; this territorial organization remained in place until the 13th century. The principal noble families of the County of Warasch included the houses of Montbéliard, La Roche, and Montfaucon, as well as the baronies of Arguel, Salins, Granges, Cusance, Belvoir, Rougemont, Neuchâtel-Burgundy, and Scey.

== Saint Sigismund ==
Sigismund, king of the Burgundians, who founded the Abbey of Agaune in 515 or 517, donated to it a large part of the County of Warasch and of Scoding: In pago Bisuntinensi Salinum cum castro de Bracon, Miegens, ("in the parishes of Salins, with the castle of Bracon and Mièges"); Salins, Bracon et Mièges were located around Pontarlier.

Another source attests to the county's existence in the 11th century: an act of confirmation by Rudolph III, king of Burgundy, in which he confirms to Ermengarde (or Ermenburge), wife of Humbert II of Salins, the property previously granted to her father, Lambert, count of Vaud. This act refers to a church dedicated to Saint Gorgonius located at Albona, within the diocese of Besançon and the County of Warasch.

Earlier, in 870, following the division of the kingdom of Lothair II between Louis the German and Charles the Bald, the counties of Warasch, Amaous, and Port were assigned to Louis, along with several abbeys, including Faverney, Poligny, Luxeuil, Lure, Baume, Altapetra, and Château-Chalon.

== See also ==
- Pontarlier
- Burgundians
