= Islam in Besançon =

Colonial military units composed of African Muslims were stationed in Besançon and the Franche-Comté from the 1870s to World War I to augment the French army and protect its frontiers during its conflicts with Germany. Large-scale immigration of Muslims to France began in the 1960s and 1970s. In 1981, the Center of Islam of the Franche-Comté was created, as the sunna association was formed in 1987. In 2010, Islam was the second largest religion in Besançon after Catholicism. According to a report by France Bleu Besançon in 2010, 15,000 Muslims live in Besançon and comprise about 13% of the city's population.

== History ==
=== Colonial soldiers in Franche-Comté ===
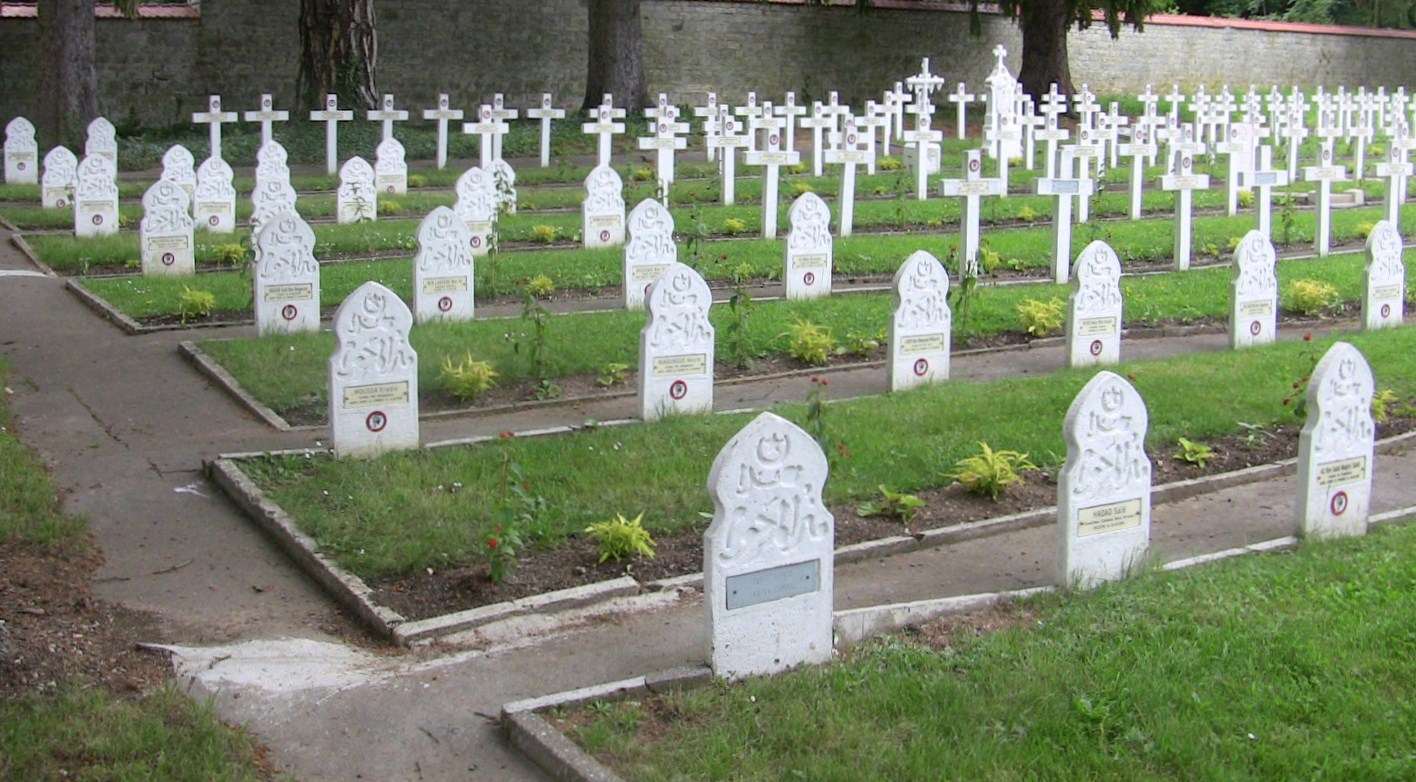
Graves of colonial soldiers in the cemetery of Saint-Claude, Besançon.

After the Franco-Prussian War and mostly in the beginning of the 20th century the French state enrolled many people of the French colonial empire, especially from Maghreb for settle in border region (Nord, Alsace and Franche-Comté.). After the defeat of the Second French Empire front of the Germans kingdoms and kingdom of Prussia in 1871, the French government getting ready for revenge dice 1890; but the country have not got a great army, it's because the French state called many people from Maghreb nommed coloniaux. (Note: Detailed inventory of Coloniaux, for a total of 565,000 mobilized (including 97,100 killed or missing): 175,000 Algerians (whose 35,000 killed or missing); 40,000 Moroccans (whose 12,000 killed or missing); 80,000 Tunisians (whose 21,000 killed or missing); 180,000 Black Africans (whose 25,000 killed or missing); 41,000 Madagascans (whose 2,500 killed or missing); 49,000 Indo-Chinese (whose 1,600 killed or missing)) La dépêche of January 2 of 1910, the newspaper of Besançon, have write an article about this coloniaux : "Since we do not want to have enough children to keep our flag in front of a Germany increasingly bloated, we have one resource, recruit soldiers among the primitive men who, under our rule, consent to be born and die. So, as soon as possible, we must organize the black and Arab troops to form an incomparable force of 200,000 trades. Yes, we must create the black army, the Arab army, supported by our decadence."

The French state called again the coloniaux for World War II. A commemorative plaque pays tribute for him in the center of Besançon : "In Memory of 14 000 Dead In Fighting the FIRST FRENCH ARMY - African Army (Army B) which, after fighting in Tunisia and Italy, will arrive in Provence with a portion of the American 6th Army Corps, release Toulon and Marseille, then arrive in record time in the Doubs, where the difficulty of supplying the detention of two months. General de Lattre de Tassigny in command of this unit makes your PC Besançon Lecourbe Street, the equation of volunteers from the Resistance (French Forces of the Interior), and African units. In the Doubs PC Montbéliard the Army (the Army called B) take the name of First French Army. On November 14, 1944, it is the offensive that will free the rest of the department of Doubs, Belfort and Alsace, then cross the Rhine and pursue the enemy into Austria. On May 8, 1945 its leader, General de Lattre de Tassigny sign on behalf of France's surrender in Berlin. The arms of Colmar became his badge, the two great rivers of the designation: Rhine and Danube."

The city of Besançon have two Muslim cemeteries for the coloniaux deads during the world wars (one in the city and one at short distance) : the Muslims cemetery of Saint-Claude area (twenty tombs) and the military cemetery of Rougemont (2169 tombs). A statue named Les Sentinelles de la Mémoire (The Sentinels of Memory) was also created paying tribute to the foreigner deads for the France during the world wars.

=== Immigration to Besançon ===
Nationalities of Muslim immigrants to Besançon between 1946 and 1999
	1946	1954	1962	1968	1971	1972	1973	1974	1975	1977	1979	1981	1983	1990	1999
Algeria	0	282	1034	1416	1899	2201	3652	3793	3837	3100	2695	2622	1718	2024	1545
Morocco	0	3	-	228	389	639	795	901	934	1134	1251	1231	1473	2057	1300
Tunisia	0	2	-	36	142	241	299	300	297	300	299	332	313	316	288
Turkey	1	3	-	-	27	49	120	114	154	282	287	341	327	464	522

== Mosques and associations ==
Al-fath association exists since the 2000s (decade) in the French area of Planoise, located in Besançon. This association was hosted in a HLM in the area, and had to move to another building because the HLM was going to be destroyed. Al-Fath association works essentially for the Islamic and civic education, sportive events, releases and travels, assistant at the Muslims for administrative queries. For his removal, the association rent a terrain at the city of Besançon for one symbolic euro, during 99 years. For finance the construction of the building, Al-Fath association appeal the gift at the Muslims of the area. In 2008, the association was reinstalled and the first imam (mister Dahmani) took function.

The second mosque of Besançon was built at the end of the 1990s, and is called the Sunna mosque. It is located in Saint-Claude area and has a minaret. The city also has a cemetery for the Muslims.

== See also ==
- Islam in France
- Planoise
- History of Besançon
