= Francis of Assisi Church =

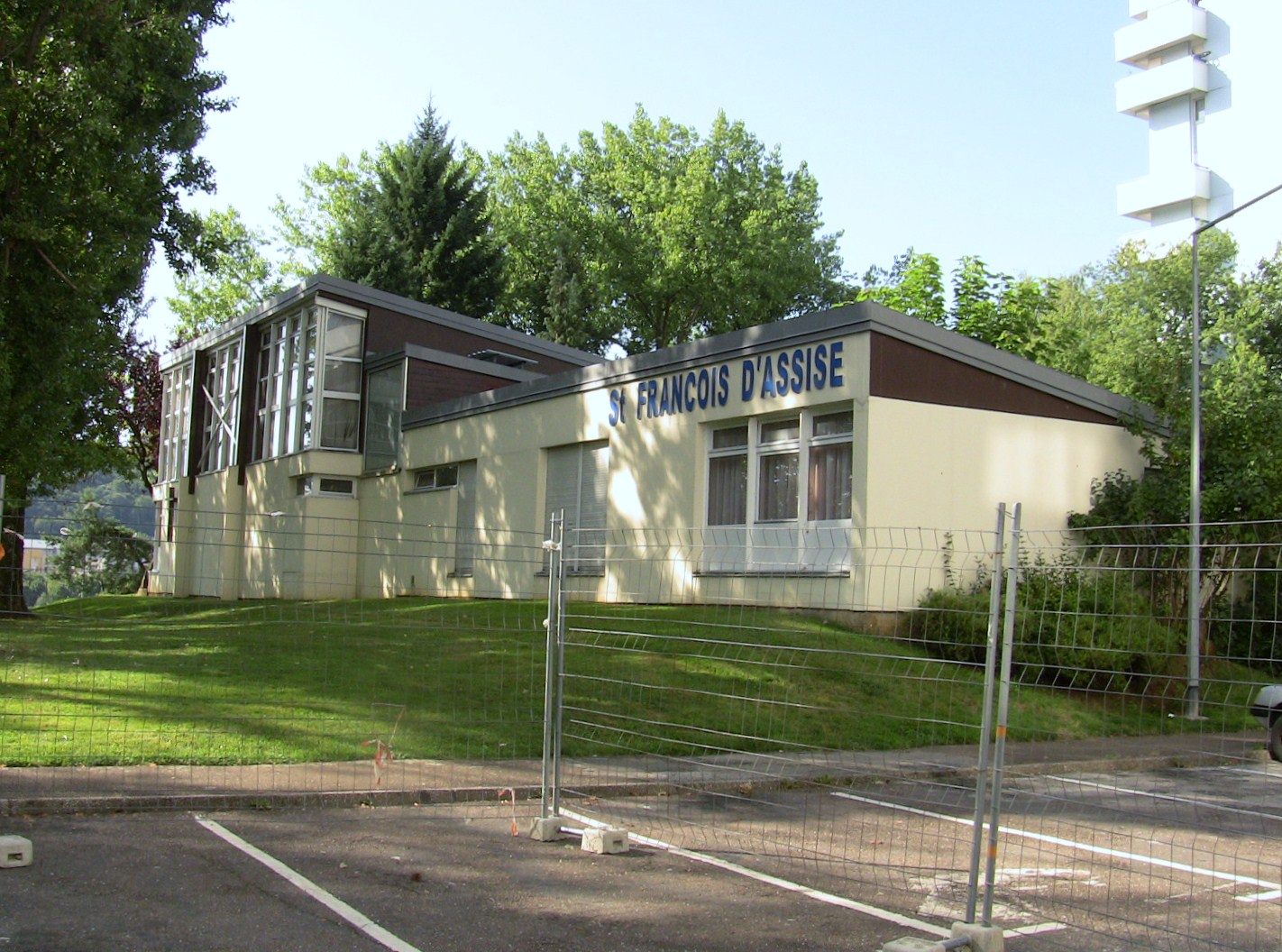
- General view of the building

- Location within France

General information
- Type: church
- Location: Besançon, France
- Coordinates: 47.2227°N 5.9785°E
- Construction started: 1970

Design and construction
- Architect: Maurice Novarina

Francis of Assisi Church (French: Église Saint-François d’Assise) is a Roman Catholic church located in the Planoise area in Besançon, Doubs, France. It was built during the 20th century.

== History ==
The church was built in the beginning of the 1970s by Maurice Novarina, a famous French architect who built also the sector of Époisses in Planoise. This building is the only church of the area and was inaugurated in 1972. Before, the Christians went to Roy farm, before the construction of Micropolis.

Just a hundred church-goers attend this church, but once the monument received up to four priests. The architecture of the church is contemporary, a fresco composed of a 33,000-piece mosaic is located at the entry of the church.

Fresco of Francis of Assisi church, composed by 33.000 mosaic and create by the artist Pascutto, in 1990

== See also ==
- Planoise
- Besançon
