= Jean Minjoz =

French politician

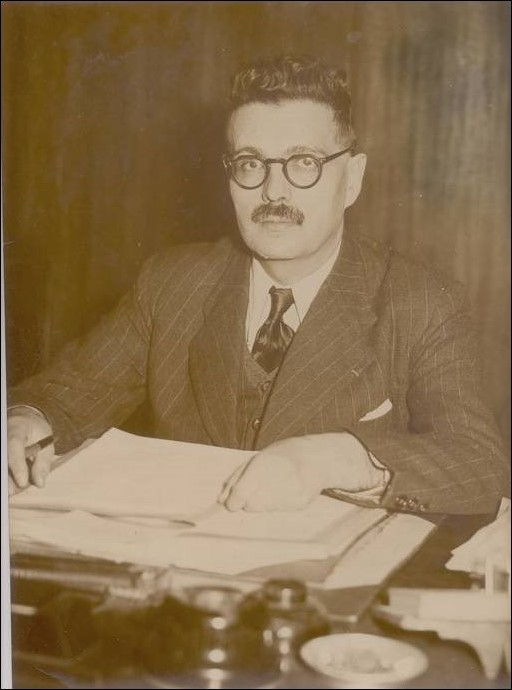
Jean Minjoz Portrait

Jean Minjoz (12 October 1904 - 18 November 1987) was a French politician.

Minjoz was born in Montmélian, but moved to Besançon with his family as a child. He represented the French Section of the Workers' International (SFIO) in the Constituent Assembly elected in 1945, in the Constituent Assembly elected in 1946 and in the National Assembly from 1946 to 1958. He was the mayor of Besançon from 1945 to 1947 and from 1953 to 1977.
