= Transport in Besançon =

Overview of transportation systems in Besançon, France

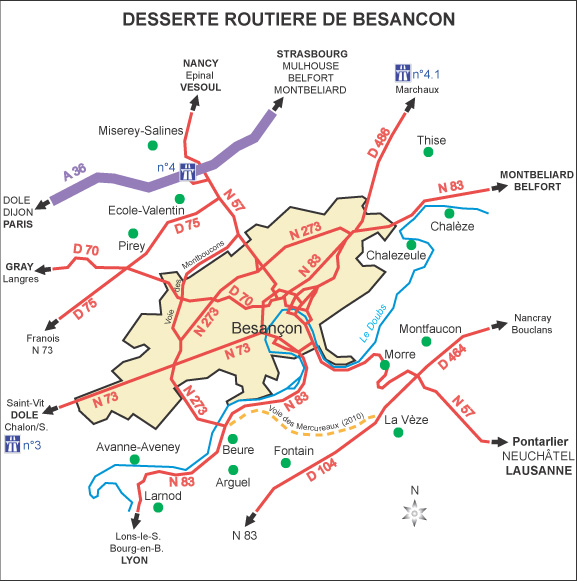
- Road network of Besançon

Overview
- Locale: Besançon, France
- Transit type: Road, rail, river, air, bus, tram, cycling

Operation
- Operators: Various operators (SNCF, Ginko, etc.)

As in most European cities, transport in Besançon is dominated by the automobile. The city is well-served by rail transport, particularly with TGV trains connecting it to Paris.

== Road network ==
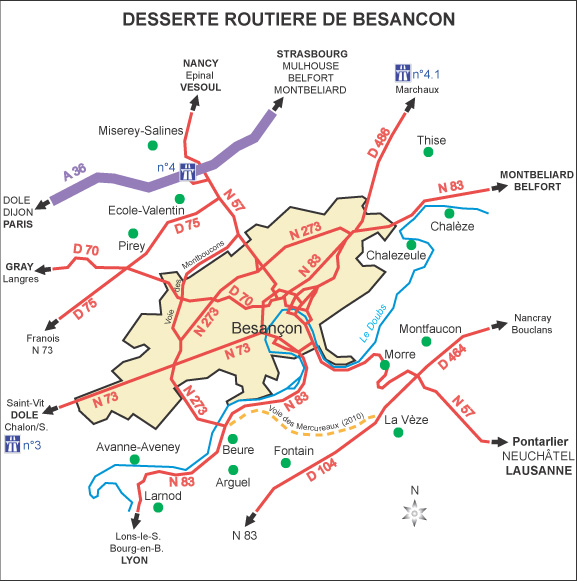
Road network of Besançon

The Besançon agglomeration is served by the A 36, linking Beaune to Mulhouse, operational since 1980. Due to the city's topography, traffic congestion is a significant issue, posing a major local challenge for the future. Since the early 1990s, significant projects have addressed these issues. A tunnel under the Citadel has alleviated central city congestion by connecting the N 83 and N 57.

A 2x2 lane bypass is under construction to circumvent the city. The first section, Voie des Montboucons, opened in 2003, linking the Dole road ( N 73), Gray road (D70), and Vesoul road ( N 57). The second section, Voie des Mercureaux, inaugurated in July 2011, is more complex, featuring two tunnels and a viaduct over the Mercureaux valley across a 6 km stretch with a continuous slope exceeding 5%. It connects the Lyon road ( N 83) and the Lausanne road ( N 57) south of Besançon near Beure.

== Rail network ==
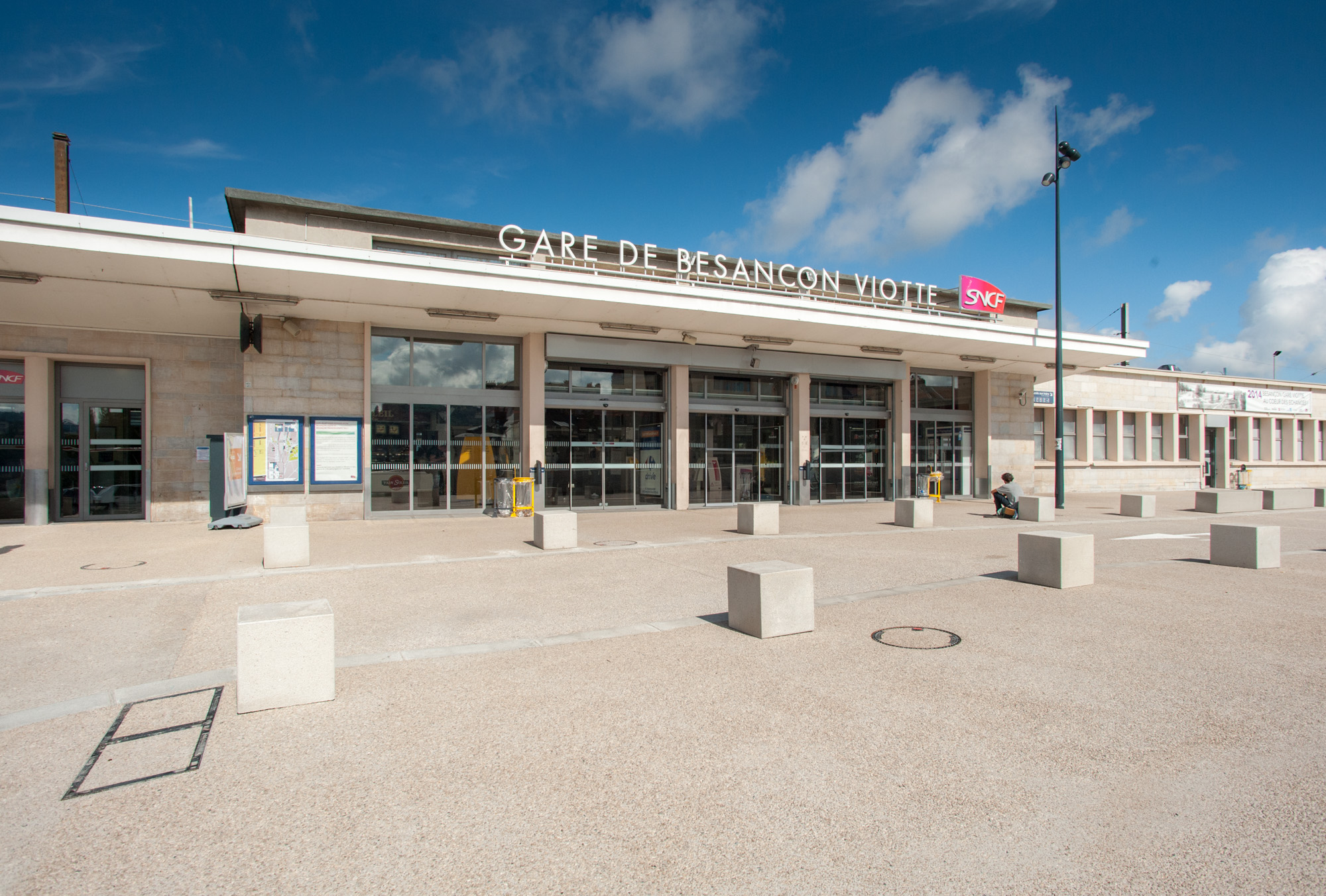
Besançon-Viotte station

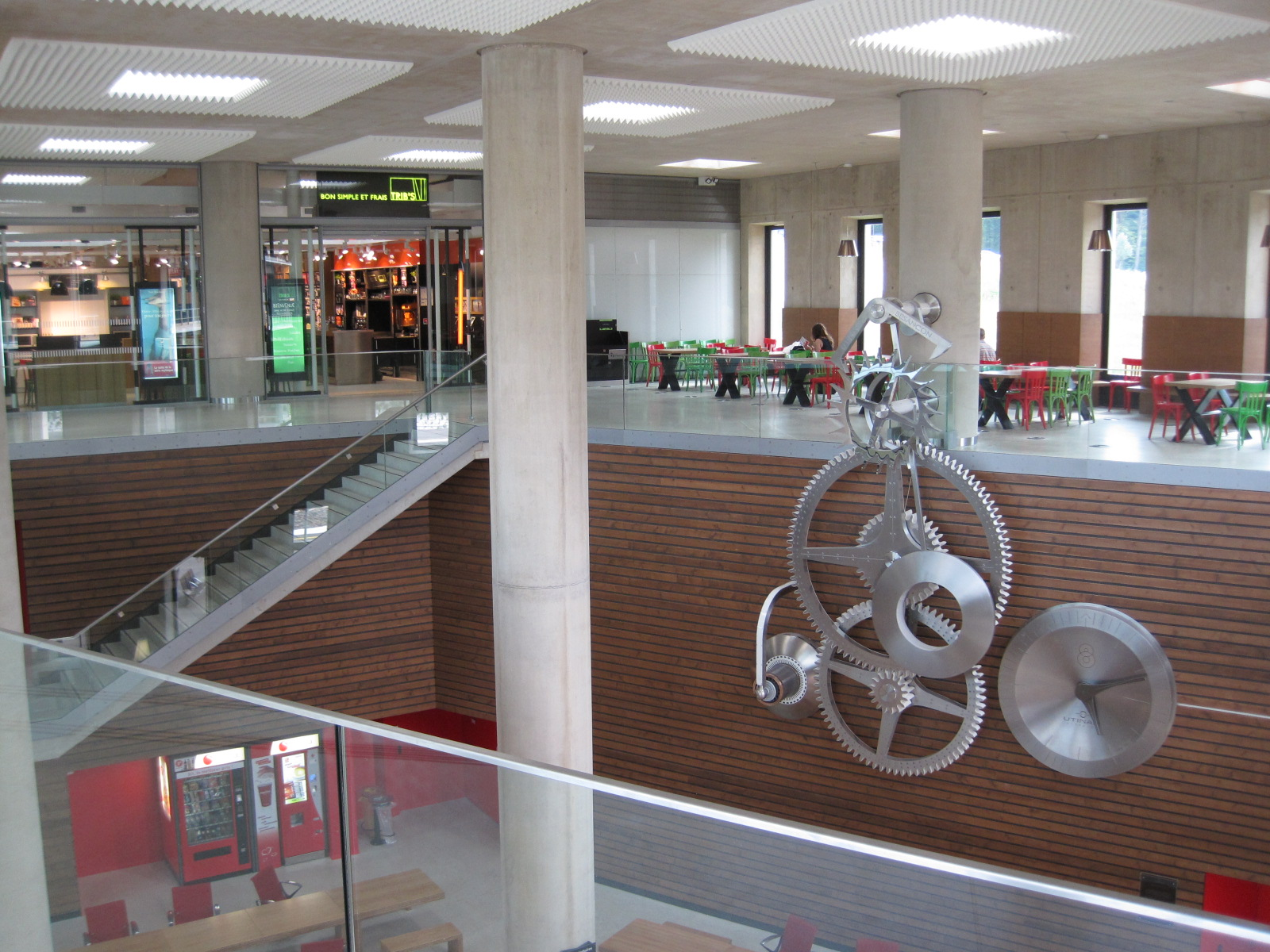
Besançon Franche-Comté TGV station

The primary rail hub of Franche-Comté, Besançon-Viotte station, serves 2.6 million passengers annually. Since 1981, a TGV line has connected Besançon to Paris in 2 hours and 40 minutes, using conventional tracks between Montbard and Besançon. TER Bourgogne-Franche-Comté trains operate on the Dole-Ville to Belfort line, linking to Dijon, Dole, Belfort, and Montbéliard. A non-electrified secondary line, the Besançon-Viotte to Le Locle-Col-des-Roches line, known as the "watchmakers' line," serves Besançon-Mouillère station, Valdahon, Morteau, and La Chaux-de-Fonds in Switzerland.

Since 11 December 2011, the Rhine-Rhône high-speed line has served Besançon via the new Besançon Franche-Comté TGV station in Les Auxons. This station, also served by TER Bourgogne-Franche-Comté, connects to Besançon-Viotte station using a renovated and electrified section of the former Besançon-Viotte to Vesoul line. The LGV reduces travel time to Paris to 2 hours.

Notably, Vesoul, the only departmental prefecture in Franche-Comté without a direct rail link to Besançon, is accessible by coach via Belfort.

The following table summarizes key direct regional, national, and international rail connections from Besançon in 2005:

Main rail connections from Besançon (2005)
| Destination | Daily return trips | Optimal travel time | TGV travel time (2011) |
|---|---|---|---|
| Paris | 6 | 2h35 | 2h05 |
| Lyon | 7 | 2h13 | 1h55 |
| Marseille | 2 | 4h18 | 3h35 |
| Strasbourg | 7 | 2h23 | 1h40 |
| Mulhouse | 10 | 1h30 | 0h45 |
| Dijon | 27 | 0h46 | 0h25 |
| Dole | 26 | 0h19 | |
| Saint-Vit | 19 | 0h10 | |
| Baume-les-Dames | 15 | 0h21 | |
| Belfort | 19 | 1h06 | 0h25 |
| Montbéliard | 21 | 0h51 | 0h25 |
| La Chaux-de-Fonds (Switzerland) | 5 | | |
Source: Mobilignes and ministerial approval dossier, RFF-SNCF, August 2004

== River transport ==
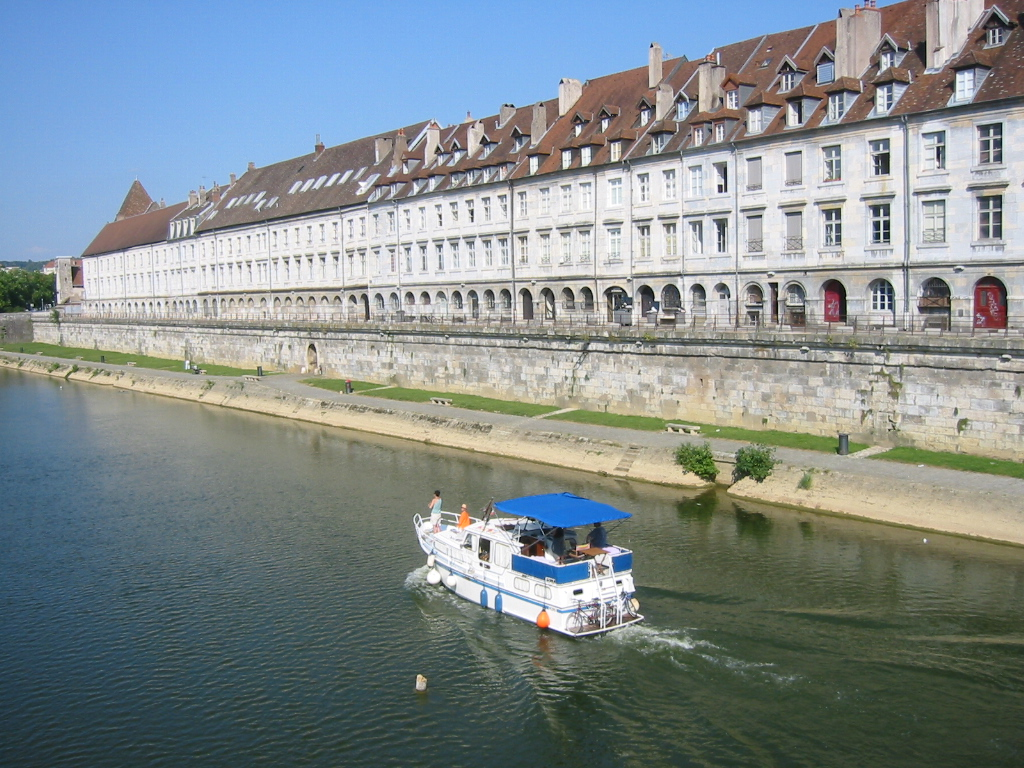
Navigation along La Boucle of the Doubs at Quai Vauban

Situated in a meander of the Doubs, Besançon is crossed by the Rhône-Rhine Canal. Its narrow gauge limits navigation to tourist boats. A tunnel under the Citadel bypasses La Boucle. A 1961 proposal to widen the canal was abandoned in 1997 following strong opposition from local officials and residents.

== Air transport ==
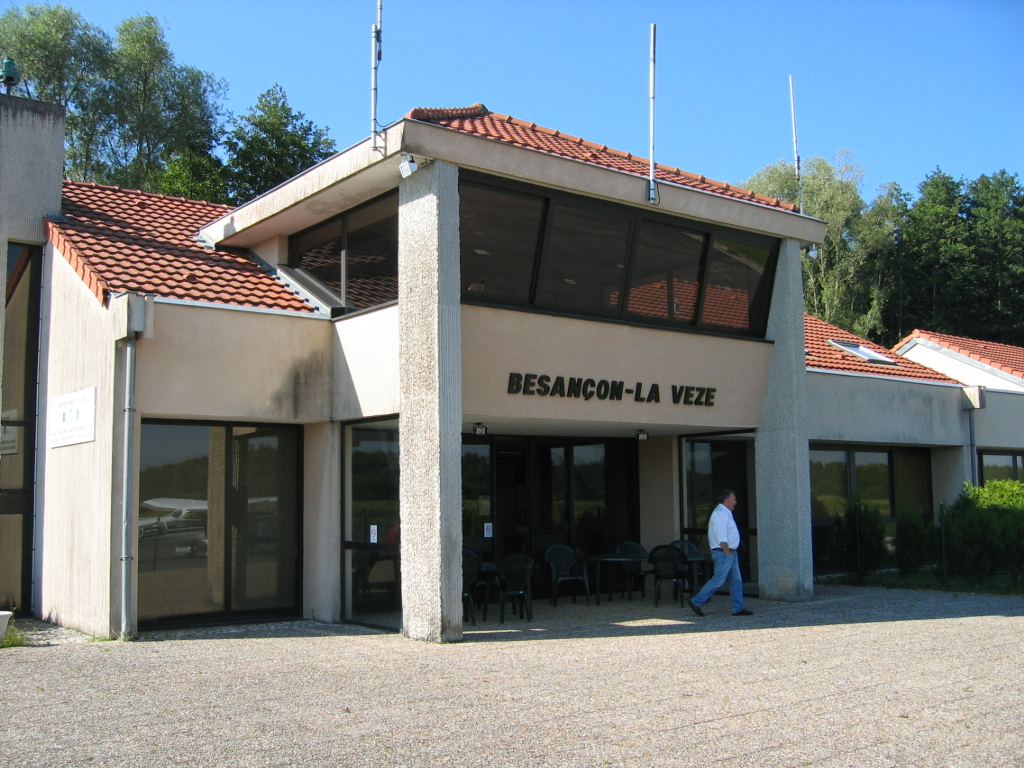
Besançon–La Vèze Aerodrome

Due to its rugged terrain and insufficient critical mass, Besançon lacks a commercial airport but hosts two small aerodromes: Besançon–La Vèze Aerodrome in La Vèze, offering air taxi services across Europe, and Besançon–Thise Aerodrome in Thise.

Travellers typically use Dole–Jura Airport (50 km away) or international airports such as Geneva Airport (170 km), Lyon–Saint-Exupéry Airport (220 km), or EuroAirport Basel-Mulhouse-Freiburg (160 km).

== Urban transport ==
=== Bus ===
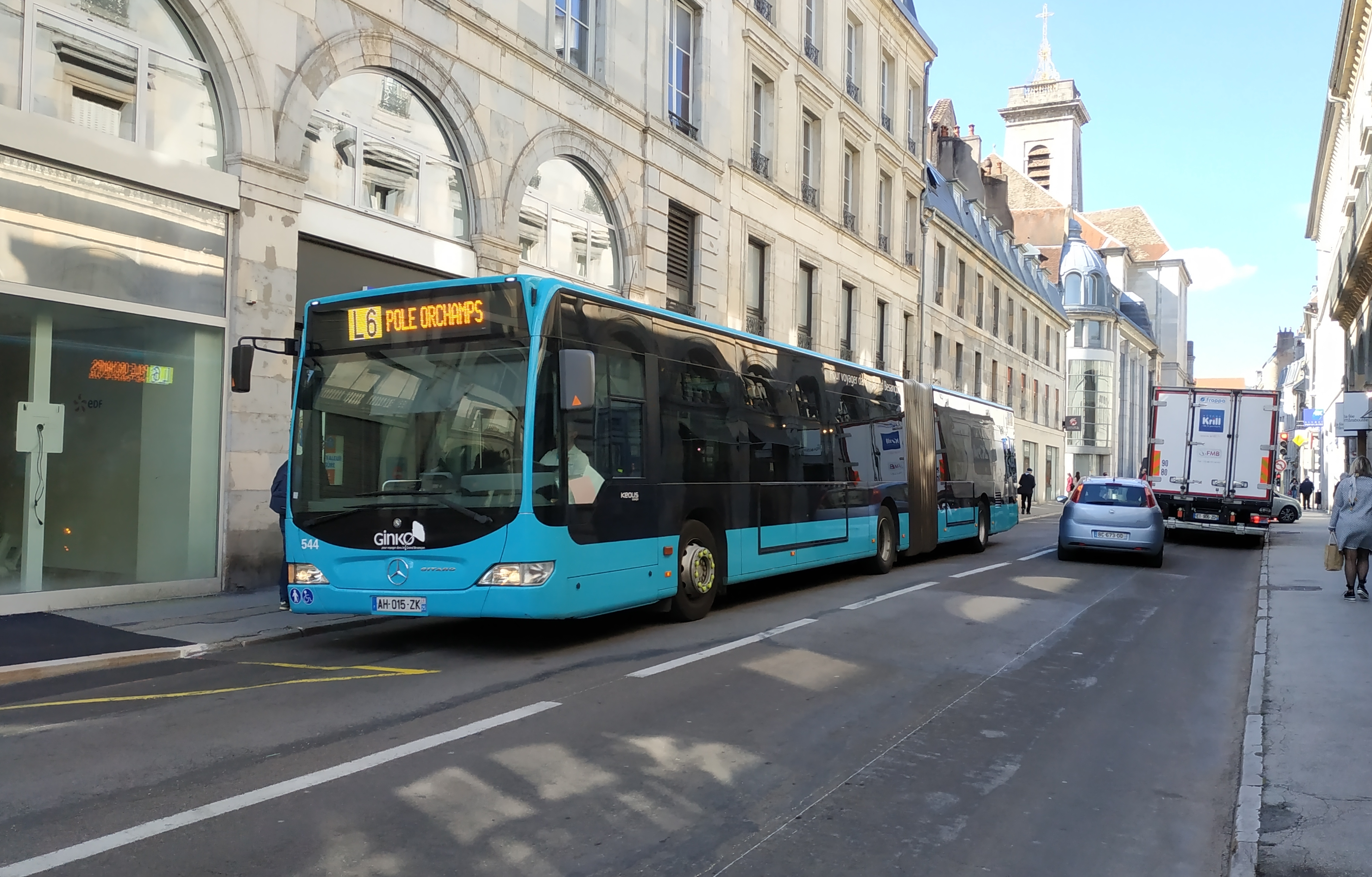
Ginko network bus

The Grand Besançon Métropole, comprising Besançon and 66 other communes, is served by the Ginko bus network. The fleet includes 280 vehicles (104 coaches and 176 buses), with 61 running on natural gas, operating 53 lines and 846 stops (624 in Besançon, 224 elsewhere). In Besançon, public transport usage averages 180 trips per inhabitant annually, high despite frequent strikes and delays. Across the Métropole, this drops to 129 trips. The urban network comprises 23 lines running from 05:30 to 01:00 daily, while 31 peri-urban lines operate from 06:00 to 19:30 Monday to Saturday, with 5–13 daily return trips per commune to Besançon.

=== Tramway ===
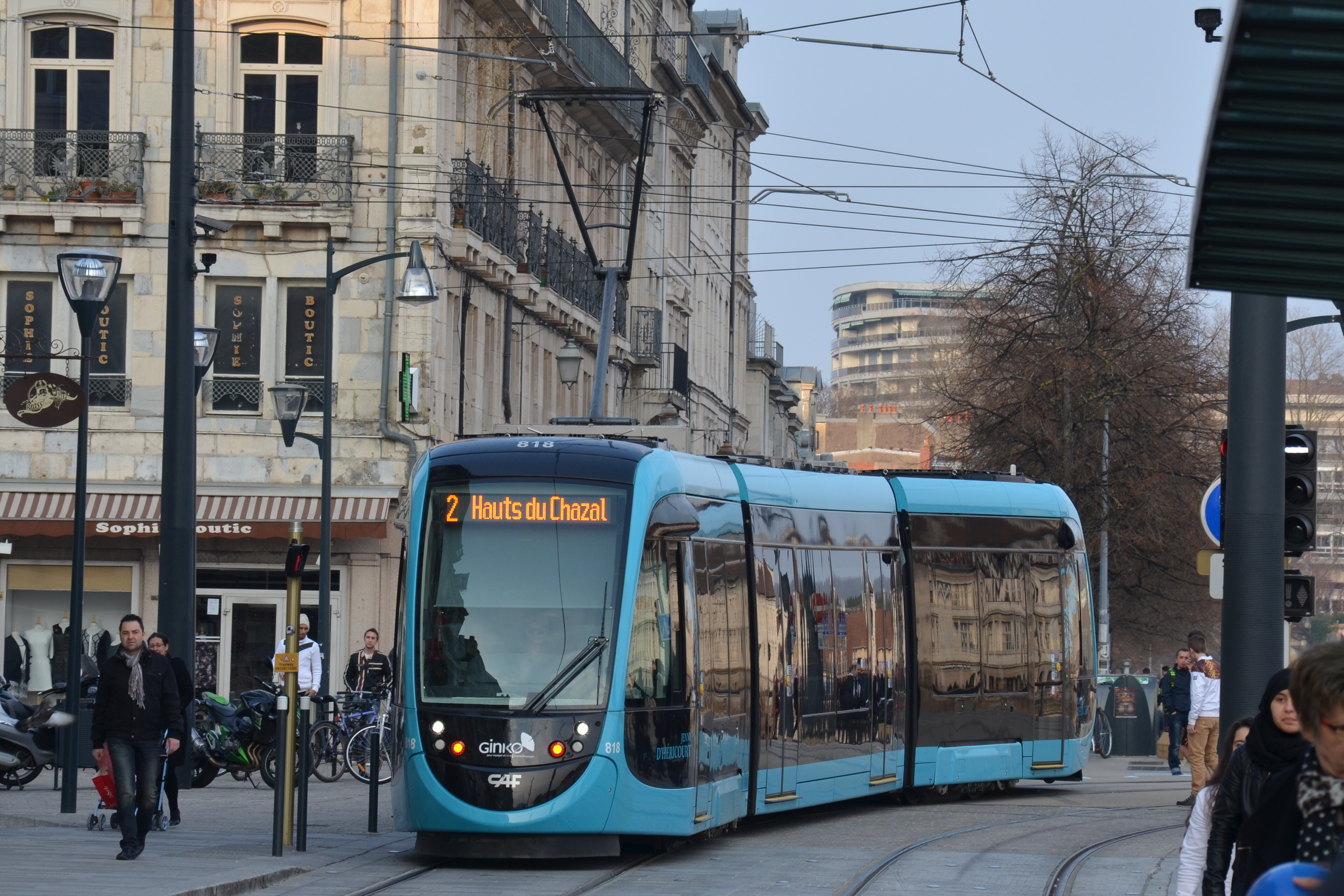
Besançon tram at Battant station

In 2014, Grand Besançon Métropole and Besançon introduced a dedicated public transport system (TCSP) with bus lanes and a tramway. Two routes were established: one from Hauts-du-Chazal to Besançon-Viotte station, and another from Chalezeule to Hauts-du-Chazal. The tramway enhances comfort, environmental sustainability, and counters declining bus speeds due to traffic congestion. It replaces an earlier tram network that operated from 1897 to 1952.

=== Carpooling ===
To reduce the 500,000 daily vehicle movements in the agglomeration, Besançon launched a carpooling website in November 2006.

=== Cycling network ===
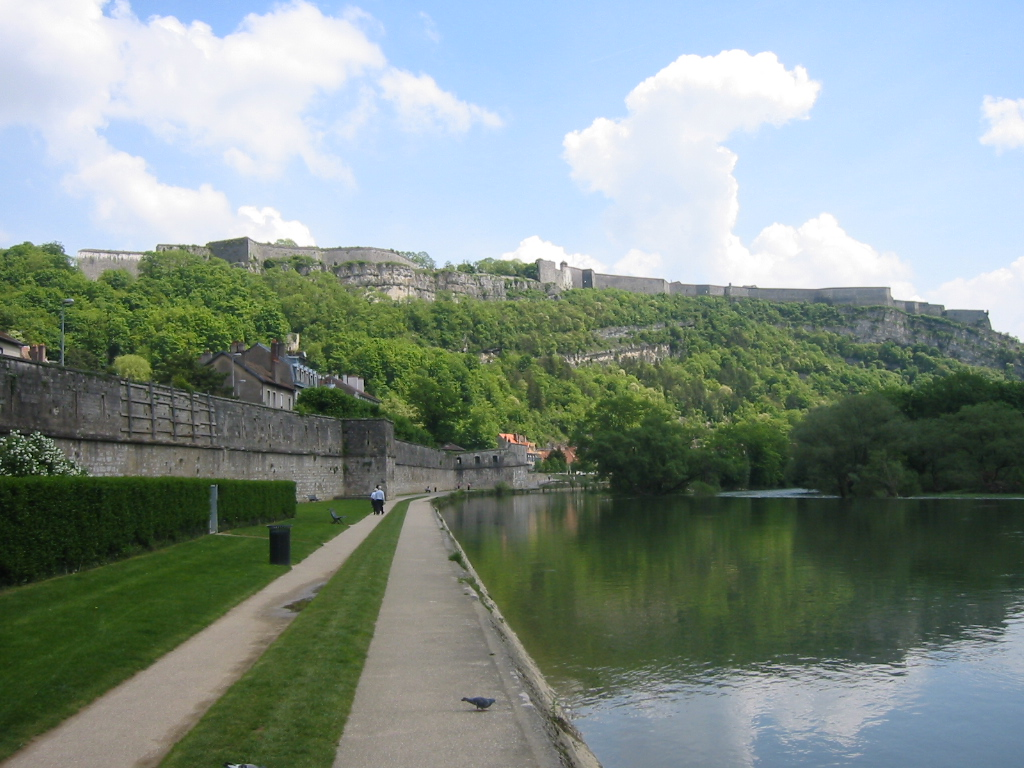
Doubs riverbanks below the Citadel, designed for pedestrians and cyclists

As of 1 January 2006, Besançon had 23.3 km of cycle paths, 25.4 km of cycle lanes, 1.8 km of contraflow cycling, and 4.4 km of bus lanes open to cyclists, totalling 55 km of cycle routes. The Association des Usagers de la Bicyclette (AUB), active since 1990, advocates for cycling infrastructure.

In 2007, four inter-urban cycle routes opened within the Métropole: Besançon-Palente to Thise, Besançon-Tilleroyes to Serre-les-Sapins, Chailluz Forest to Braillans, and Saône station to Saône. The Métropole plans a 300 km network covering all 67 communes.

Besançon lies on the EV6 route, known as the "Atlantic–Black Sea" or "Rivers Route," spanning 3,653 km from Saint-Nazaire to Constanța, Romania, via ten countries and three major rivers: the Loire, Rhine, and Danube.

Since September 2007, Besançon's VéloCité bike-sharing system has offered 200 bicycles across 30 stations.

=== Pedestrian zones ===
Besançon pioneered pedestrian zones in the 1970s within the historic La Boucle and Battant districts. However, the city's bowl-shaped topography complicates further pedestrianization, as bypassing the historic center is challenging. Plans are underway to pedestrianize peripheral district streets.

== See also ==
- A36 autoroute
- Besançon Franche-Comté TGV station
- Besançon-Viotte station
- Trams in Besançon
- Rhône-Rhine Canal
- Transport in France
