= Transport in France =

Travel times by road in Metropolitan France from Paris

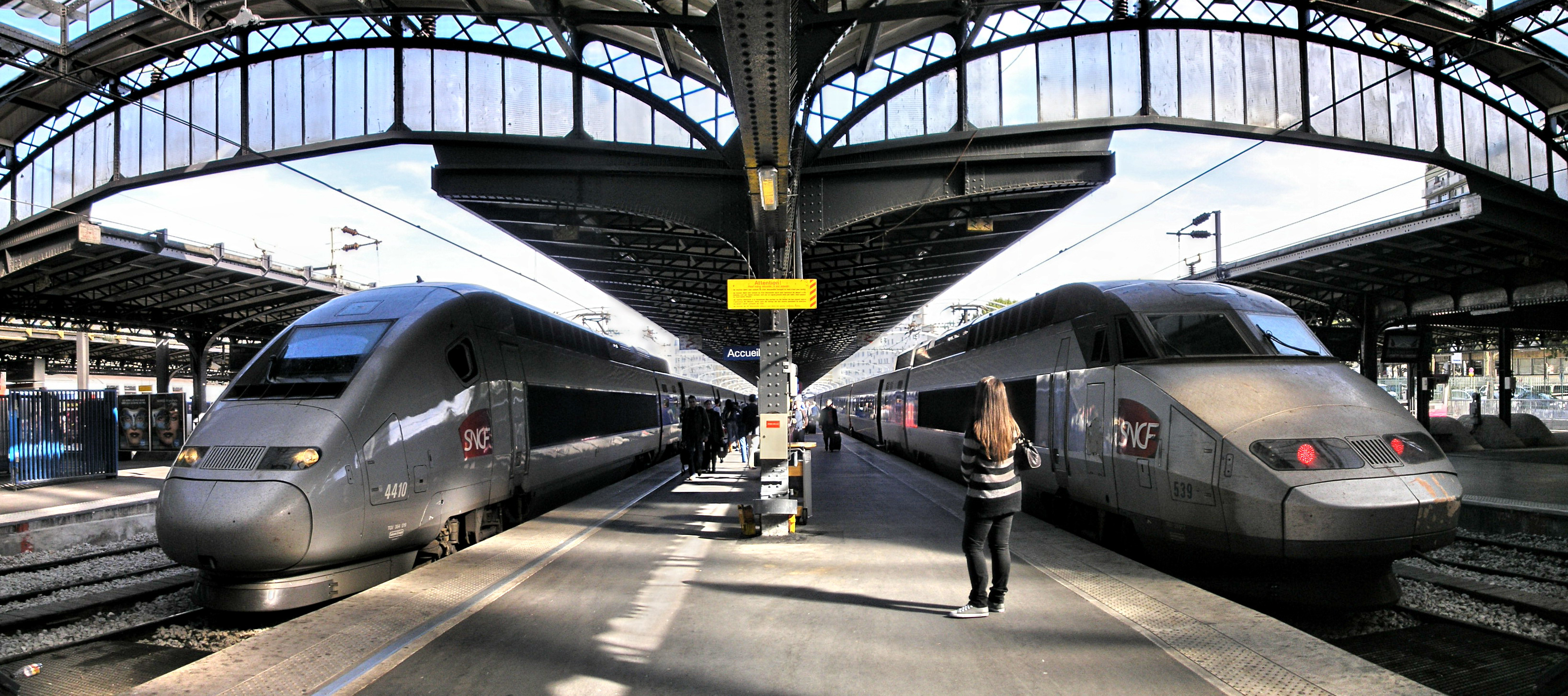
Two high-speed TGV trains at Paris-Gare de l'Est

Transportation in France relies on one of the densest networks in the world with 146 km of road and 6.2 km of rail lines per 100 km^{2}. It is built as a web with Paris at its center. Rail, road, air and water are all widely developed forms of transportation in France.

== History ==
The first important human improvements were the Roman roads linking major settlements and providing quick passage for marching armies.

All through the Middle Ages improvements were few and second rate. Transport became slow and awkward to use. The early modern period saw great improvements. There was a very quick production of canals connecting rivers. It also saw great changes in oceanic shipping. Rather than expensive galleys, wind powered ships that were much faster and had more room for cargo became popular for coastal trade. Transatlantic shipping with the New World turned cities such as Nantes, Bordeaux, Cherbourg-Octeville and Le Havre into major ports.

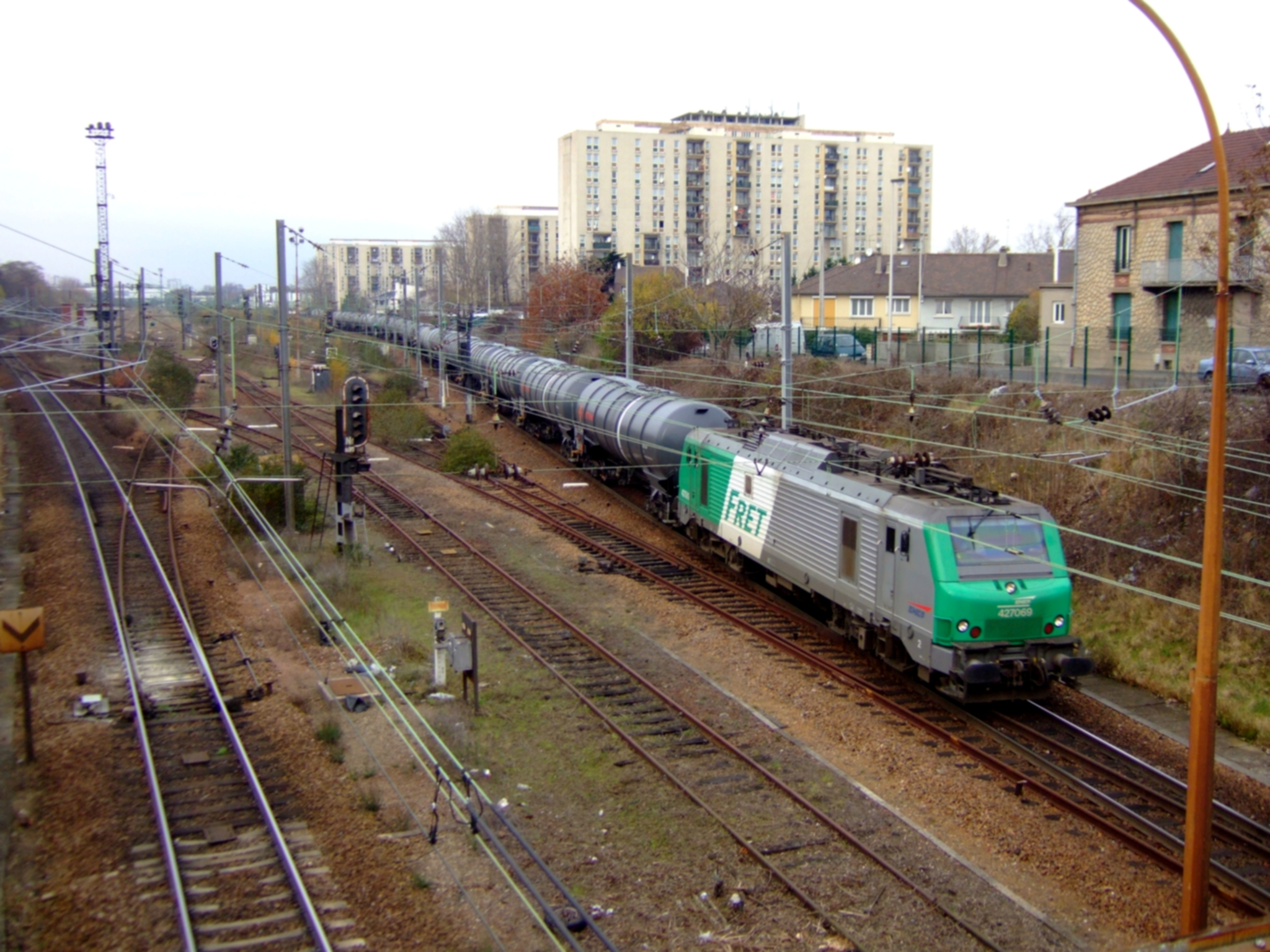
SNCF freight train running on the "Grande ceinture complémentaire" network inter yard in suburb of Paris. Here, the train is passing along the closed Villemomble yard in direction of Valenton.

By 1800, the average distance a person walked each day was around 4 kilometres (2.5 mi). The bicycle in 1870 allowed for greater distances to be travelled under human power. Cars were first used in the late 19th century, but became common in the 1950s. Air travel also increased after 1950, with an 85-fold increase compared to population by 2024.

Scientific American in 1846 contained an accounting the number and characteristics of steamboats and locomotives "in France" in 1844, amounting to 238 steamboats and 291 locomotives.

== Railways ==
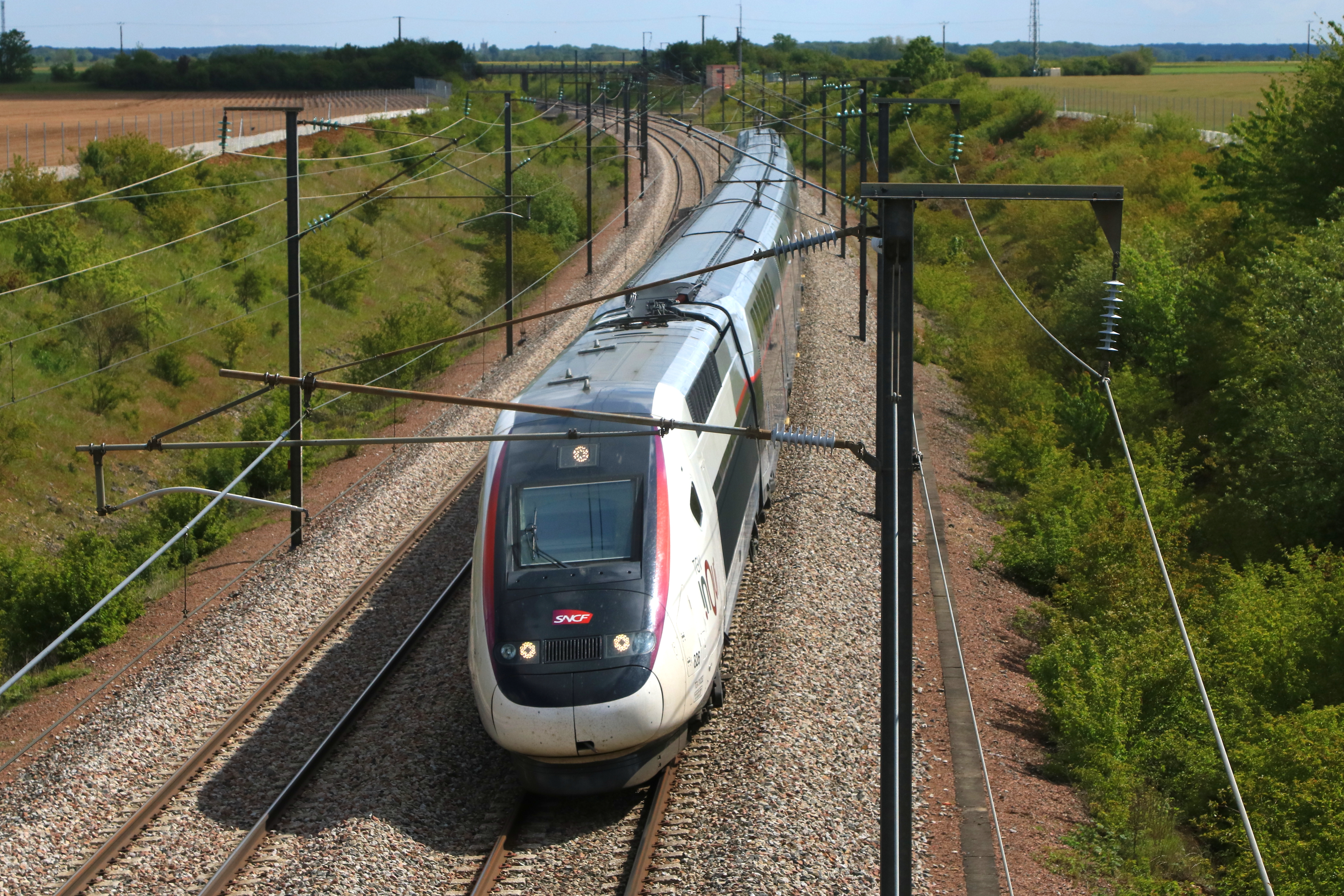
A high-speed double-decker TGV train at Boinville-le-Gaillard

There is a total of 29,901 kilometres (18,580 mi) of railway in France, mostly operated by SNCF (Société nationale des chemins de fer français), the French national railway company. Like the road system, the French railways are subsidised by the state, receiving €13.2 billion in 2013. The railway system is a small portion of total travel, accounting for less than 10% of passenger travel.

From 1981 onwards, a newly constructed set of high-speed Lignes à Grande Vitesse (LGV) lines linked France's most populous areas with the capital, starting with Paris-Lyon. In 1994, the Channel Tunnel opened, connecting France and Great Britain by rail under the English Channel. The TGV has set many world speed records, the most recent on 3 April 2007, when a new version of the TGV dubbed the V150 with larger wheels than the usual TGV, and a stronger 25,000 hp (18,600 kW) engine, broke the world speed record for conventional rail trains, reaching 574.8 km/h (357.2 mph).

Trains, unlike road traffic, drive on the left (except in Alsace-Moselle). Metro and tramway services are not thought of as trains and usually follow road traffic in driving on the right (except the Lyon Metro).

France was ranked 7th among national European rail systems in the 2017 European Railway Performance Index for intensity of use, quality of service and safety performance, a decrease from previous years.

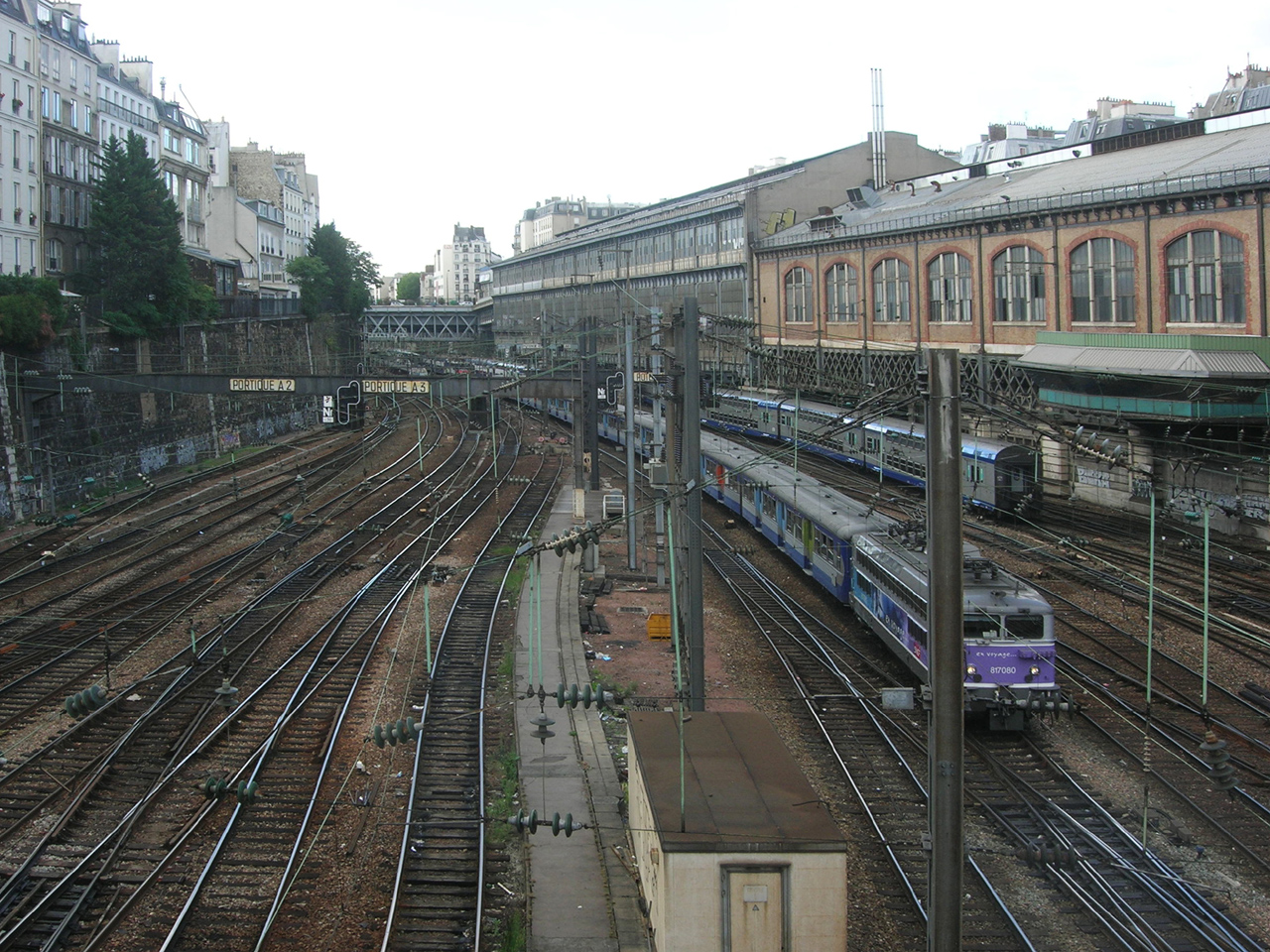
Gare Saint Lazare station

The French non-TGV intercity service (TET) is in decline, with old infrastructure and trains. It is likely to be hit further as the French government is planning to remove the monopoly that rail currently has on long-distance journeys by letting coach operators compete. Travel to the UK through the Channel Tunnel has grown in recent years, and from May 2015 passengers have been able to travel direct to Marseille, Avignon and Lyon. Eurostar is also introducing new Class 374 trains and refurbishing the current Class 373s.

The French government are making plans to privatise the French railway network, following a similar model Great Britain used from the 1990s until the 2020s.

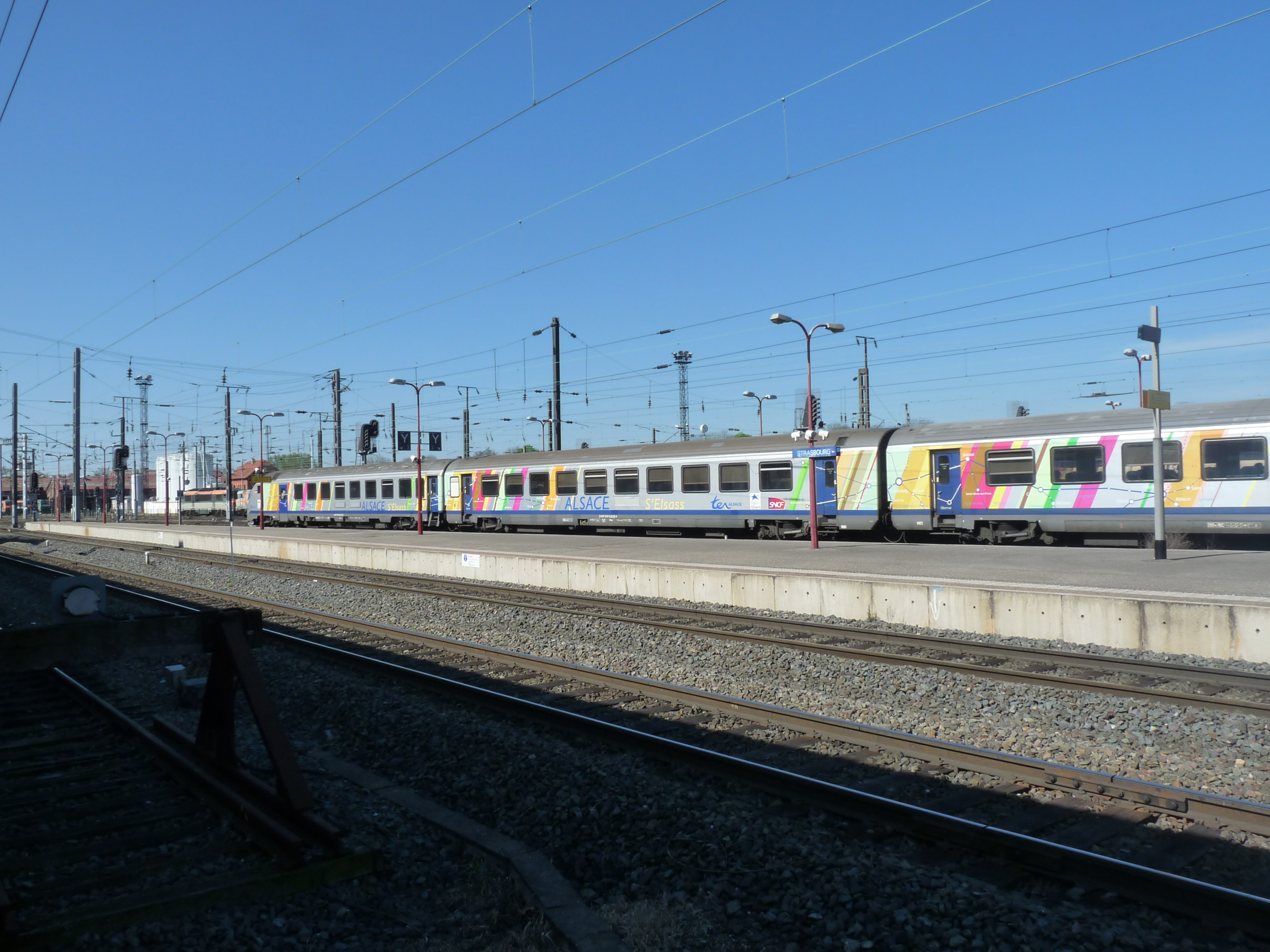
Train at Strasbourg.

=== Rapid transit ===
Six cities in France currently have a rapid transit service (frequently known as a 'metro'). Full metro systems are in operation in Paris (16 lines), Lyon (4 lines) and Marseille (2 lines). Light metro (VAL-type) systems are in use in Lille (2 lines), Toulouse (2 lines) and Rennes (2 lines).

=== Trams ===
Despite the closure of most of France's first-generation tram systems in earlier years, a growing number of France's major cities have modern tram or light rail networks, including Paris, Lyon (which has the largest), Toulouse, Montpellier, Saint-Étienne, Strasbourg and Nantes. The tram has seen a revival with experiments such as ground-level power supply in Bordeaux, or trolleybuses designed to resemble trams in Nancy.

This way of travelling started disappearing in France at the end of the 1930s. Only Lille, Marseille and Saint-Étienne have never given up their tram systems. Since the 1980s, several cities have re-introduced it.

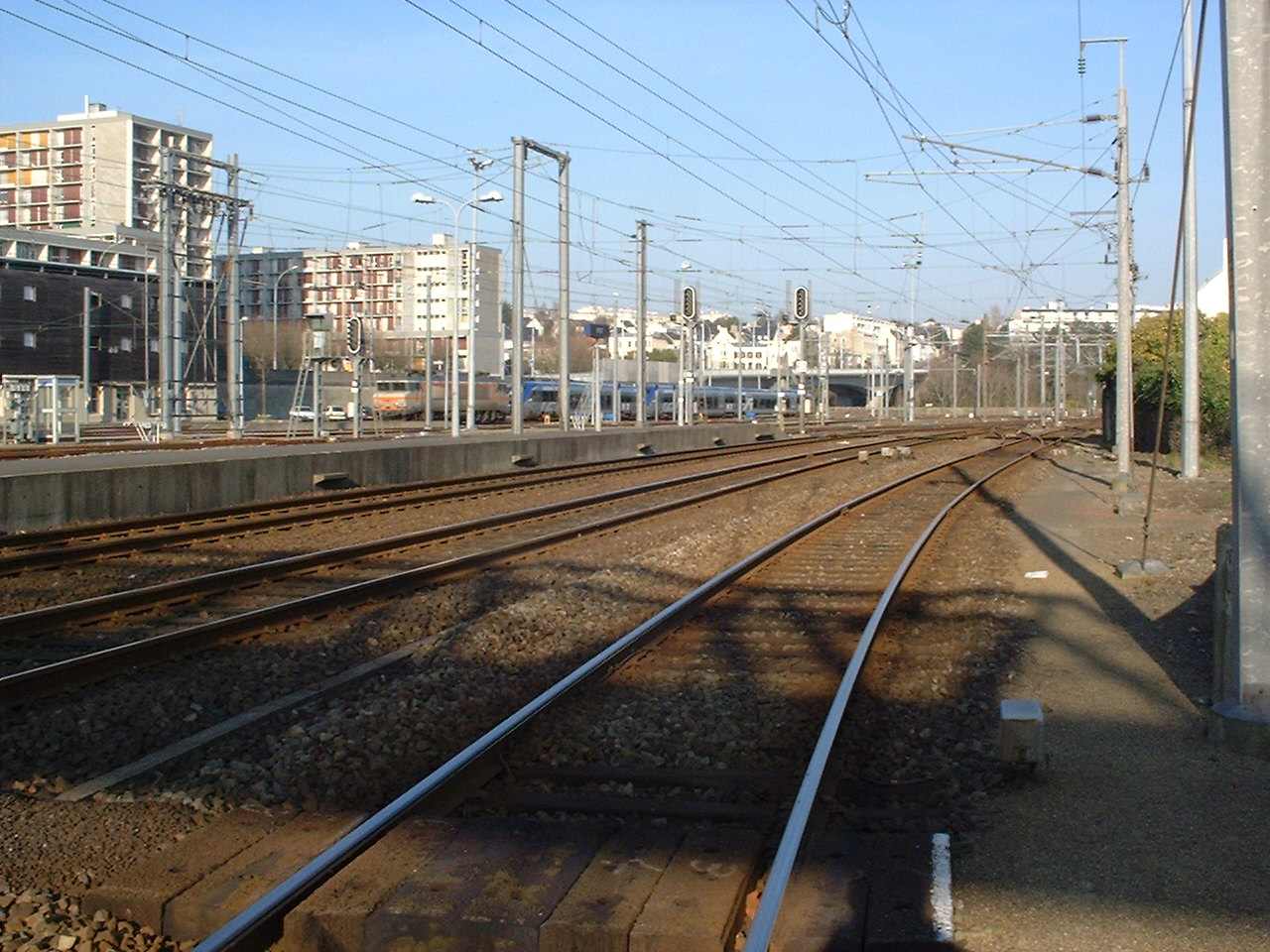
Brest station.

The following French towns and cities run light rail or tram systems:

- Angers - since 2011;
- Besançon - since 2014;
- Bordeaux - since 2003;
- Brest - since 2012;
- Caen - since 2002 as a 'trams on tyres' system, replaced 2019 by conventional trams;
- Clermont-Ferrand - since 2006, 'trams on tyres';
- Grenoble - since 1987;
- Île-de-France (Paris metropolitan area) - since 1992
- Lille, Roubaix and Tourcoing - non-stop since 1909;
- Lyon - since 2001;
- Le Mans - since 2007;
- Marseille - since 2007;
- Montpellier - since 2000;
- Mulhouse - since 2006
- Nancy - since 2000, 'trams on tyres' system featuring a single guide rail while running on tyres;
- Nice - since 2007;
- Nantes - since 1985;
- Orléans - since 2000;
- Reims - since 2011;
- Rouen - since 1994;
- Saint-Étienne - non-stop since 1881;
- Strasbourg - since 1994
- Toulouse - since 2010 (previously existed from 1906 to 1952)
- Valenciennes - since 2006
- Dijon - since 2012
- Le Havre - since 2012

Tram systems are planned or under construction in Tours, and Fort-de-France.

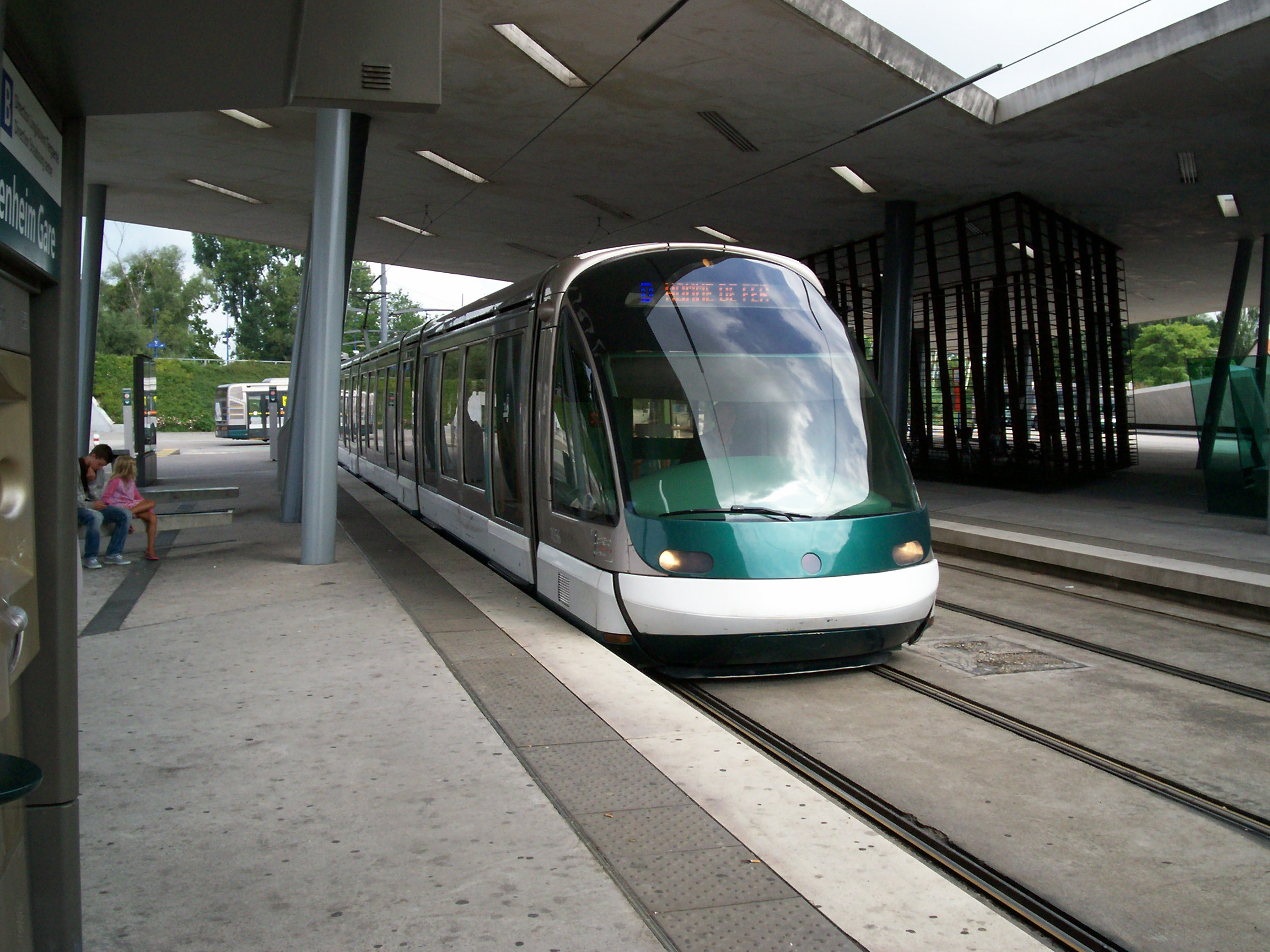
Eurotram in Strasbourg

The revival of tram networks in France has brought about a number of technical developments both in the traction systems and in the styling of the cars:

APS third rail: The Alstom APS system uses a third rail placed between the running rails, divided electrically into eight-metre segments with three metre neutral sections between. Each tram has two power collection skates, next to which are antennas that send radio signals to energise the power rail segments as the tram passes over them. At any one time no more than two consecutive segments under the tram should actually be live. Alstrom developed the system primarily to avoid intrusive power supply cables in sensitive area of the old city of Bordeaux.

Modern styling: The Eurotram, used in Strasbourg has a modern design that makes it look almost as much like a train as a tram, and has large windows along its entire length.

Modular design: The Citadis tram, flagship of the French manufacturer Alstom, enjoys an innovative design combining lighter bogies with a modular concept for carriages providing more choices in the types of windows and the number of cars and doors. The recent Citadis-Dualis, intended to run at up to 100 km/h, is suitable for stop spacings ranging from 500 m to 5 km. Dualis is a strictly modular partial low-floor car, with all doors in the low-floor sections.

Prominent bi-articulated "tram-like" Van Hool vehicles (Mettis) are used in Metz since 2013. They work as classic trams but without needing rails and catenaries, and can transport up to 155 passengers while being ecological thanks to a diesel-electric hybrid engine. In the starting up, batteries feed the engine of the bus, which can then roll 150 meters before the diesel engine takes over.

== Roads ==
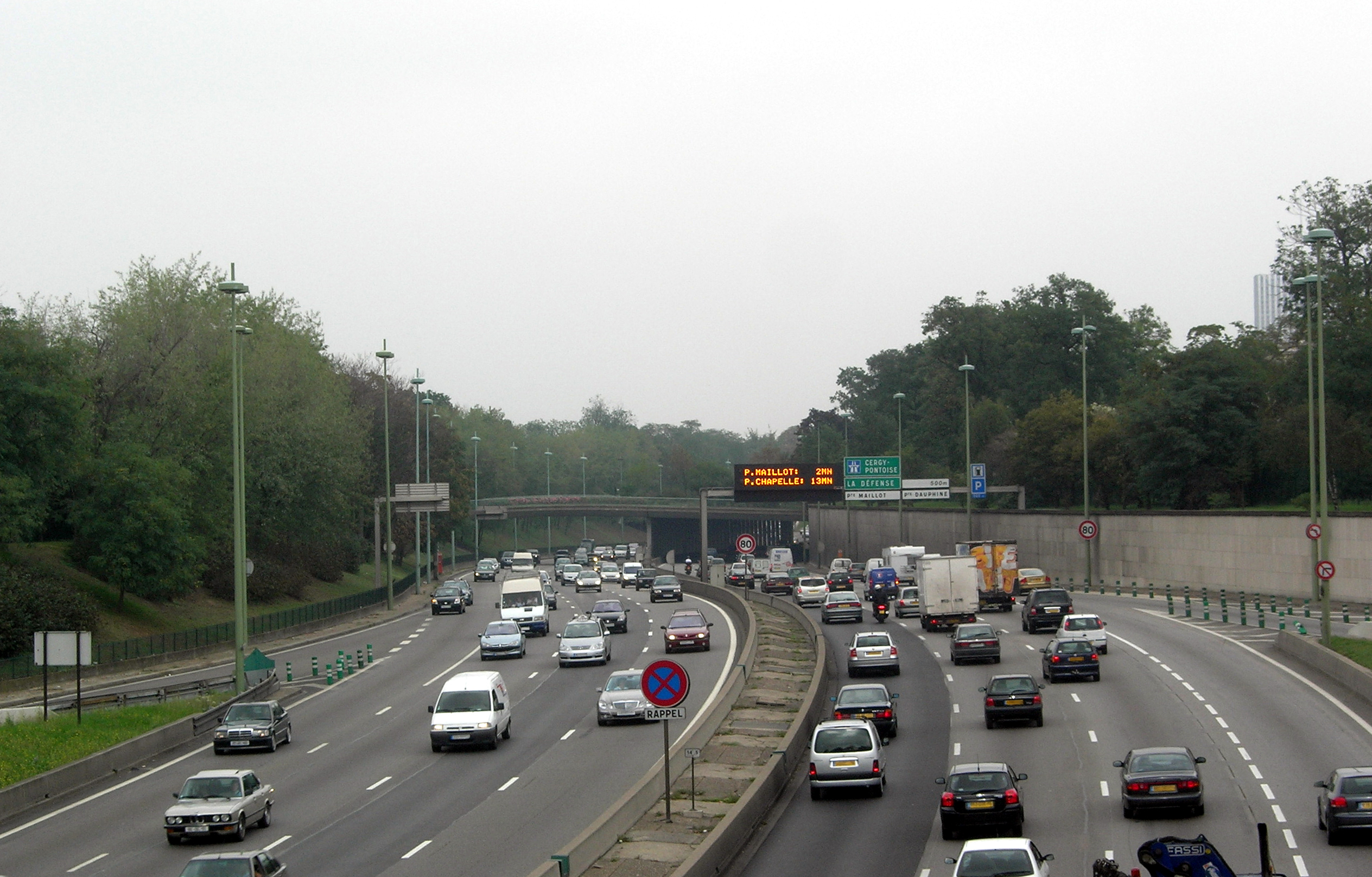
The ring road in Paris

French autoroute network

There are ~950,000 km (590,000 mi) of roads in France. The French motorway network or autoroute system consists largely of toll roads, except around large cities, in Brittany, in parts of Normandy, in the Ardennes and in Alsace. It is a network totalling 12,000 km (7,500 mi) of motorways operated by private companies such as Sanef (Société des autoroutes du Nord et de l'Est de la France). It has the 8th largest highway network in the world, trailing only the United States, China, India, Russia, Japan, Canada, Spain and Germany.

France currently counts 30,500 km of major trunk roads or routes nationales and state-owned motorways. By way of comparison, the routes départementales cover a total distance of 365,000 km. The main trunk road network reflects the centralising tradition of France: the majority of them leave the gates of Paris. Indeed, trunk roads begin on the parvis of Notre-Dame of Paris at Kilometre Zero. To ensure an effective road network, new roads not serving Paris were created.

In 2022, France safety rate is near but not better than the OECD median, with rates of 49.8 per million population (or 4.98 / 100 000) and 5.2 per billion vehicle kilometers traveled (0.52 / 100 million VKT).

France is believed to be the most car-dependent country in Europe. In 2005, 937 billion vehicle kilometres were travelled in France (85% by car). While the traveled distance did not change, from 2012 to 2022, it is counted as 730 billion vehicle kilometers. Car makes 80% of the 1000 billion vehicle kilometers traveled each year. Traveled distance is reduced in 2020, but is counted in 2019 as 615 billion vehicle kilometer traveled including 448 car with a French registration plate according to the Union routière de France.

In order to overcome this dependence, in France and many more countries the long-distance coaches' market has been liberalised. Since 2015, with the law Macron, the market has exploded: the increasing demand lead to a higher supply of bus services and coach companies.

In France, Black Saturday refers to the day of the year when road traffic is most dense due to the many departures on holiday. (Traffic problems are exacerbated by France's extreme centralisation, with Paris being the hub of the entire national highway network). This Saturday is usually at the end of July, though in 2007 both the last Saturday of July and the first Saturday of August are designated as Black Saturdays. The Autoroute du Soleil, the highway to the south of France and Spain, is usually particularly busy. In 2004 there was more than 700 kilometres (430 mi) in accumulated traffic congestion. The black colour is the qualification with which the French government web site Bison Futé designates a day with extrêmement dense (extremely busy) traffic. The French newspapers call this day samedi noir after Bison Futé's designation. Usually, the French call these days les jours de grands départs (days of great departures). In Dutch, this French phenomenon was known as zwarte zaterdag long before the French adopted the term samedi noir, both meaning (literally) Black Saturday.

The term Black Saturday may also refer to Saturday July 31, 1982, when the worst road accident in French history happened. Around 1:45 AM, a coach collided into passenger cars near Beaune in dense holiday traffic during rainfall. The collision and subsequent fire killed 53 people, among which 46 were children. After this crash, a regulation was enforced to prohibit the transportation of groups of children during this part of the year.

=== Electric roads ===
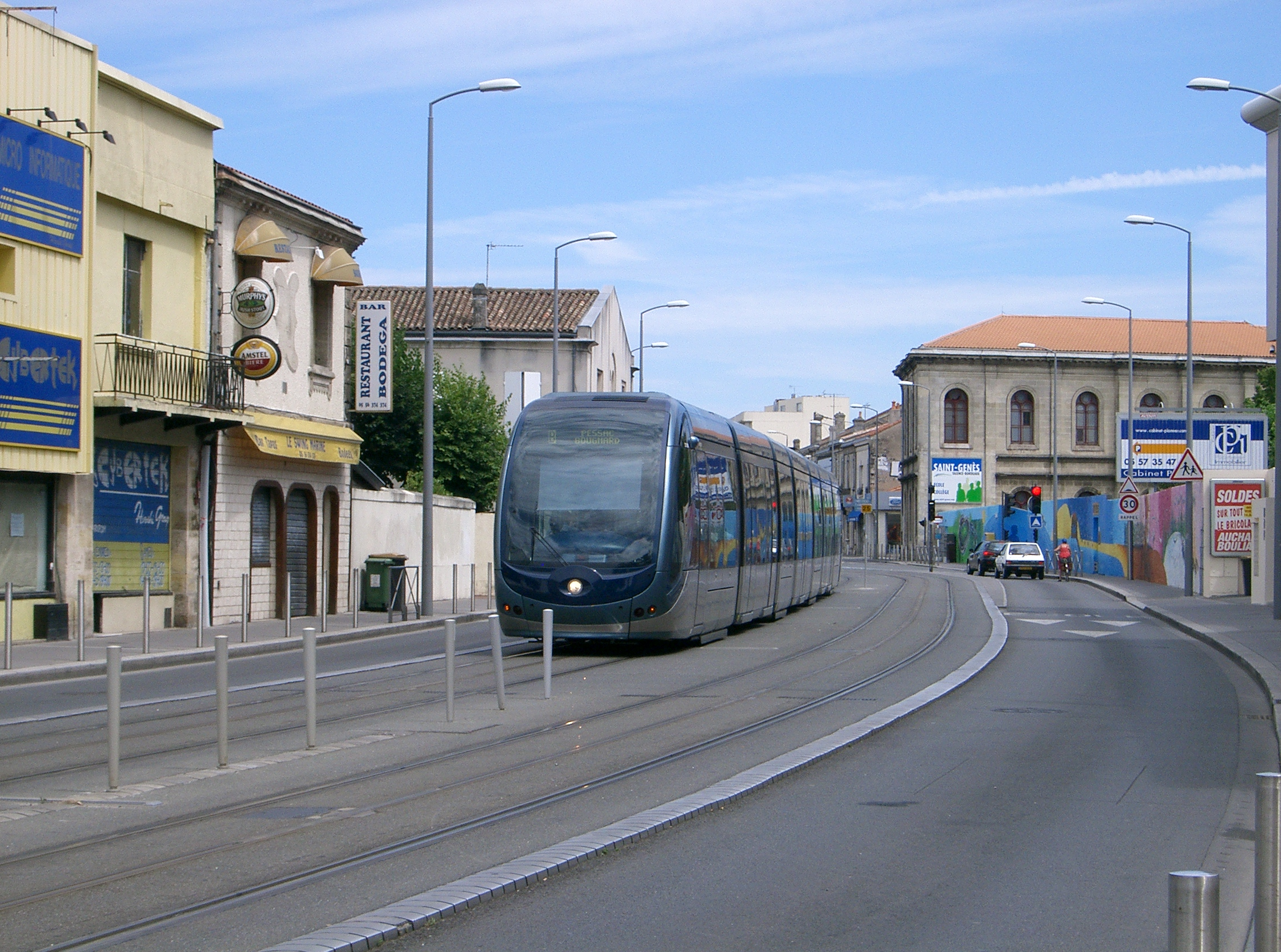
Bordeaux tramway with Alstom ground-level power supply, a technology that as of 2022 is being considered for electric roads

France plans to invest 30 to 40 billion euro by 2035 in an electric road system spanning 8,800 kilometers that recharges electric cars, buses and trucks while driving. Two projects for assessment of electric road technologies were announced in 2023. Three technologies are being considered: ground-level power supply, inductive charging, and overhead lines. Ground-level power supply technologies, provided by Alstom, Elonroad, and others, are considered the most likely candidate for electric roads. Inductive charging is not considered a mature technology as it delivers the least power, loses 20%-25% of the supplied power when installed on trucks, and its health effects have yet to be documented. Overhead lines is the most mature technology, but the catenaries and overhead wires pose safety and maintenance issues, and motorway companies find overhead lines too expensive.

A working group of the French Ministry of Ecology recommended adopting a European electric road standard formulated with Sweden, Germany, Italy, the Netherlands, Spain, Poland, and others. A standard for electrical equipment on-board a vehicle powered by a rail electric road system (ERS), CENELEC Technical Standard 50717, has been published in late 2022. A standard encompassing full interoperability and a "unified and interoperable solution" for ground-level power supply electric road systems, detailing complete specifications for "communication and power supply through conductive rails embedded in the road" is specified in CENELEC technical standard 50740 in accordance with European Union directive 2023/1804. The standard was approved in 2025.

==== Trials ====
Alstom has developed a ground-level power supply (alimentation par le sol - APS) system for use with buses and other vehicles. The system has been tested for safety when the road is cleared by snowplows, under exposure to snow, ice, salting, and saturated brine, and for skid and road adherence safety for vehicles, including motorcycles. Alstom will trial its electric road system (ERS) on the public road RN205 in the Rhône-Alpes region between 2024 and 2027. The system is expected to supply 500 kW of power for electric heavy trucks, as well as power for road utility vehicles and electric cars.

Vinci will test two electric road systems (ERS) from 2023 to 2027. Both technologies will initially be tested in laboratory conditions, and upon meeting the test requirements they will be installed along 2 kilometers each on the A10 autoroute south of Paris. Wireless ERS by Electreon will be tested for durability under highway traffic, and will attempt to reach 200 kW of power delivery per truck using multiple receivers. Rail ERS by Elonroad, which supplies 350 kW of power per receiver, will be tested for skid effects on motorcycles. Both systems will be interoperable with cars, buses, and trucks.

=== Bus transport in France ===
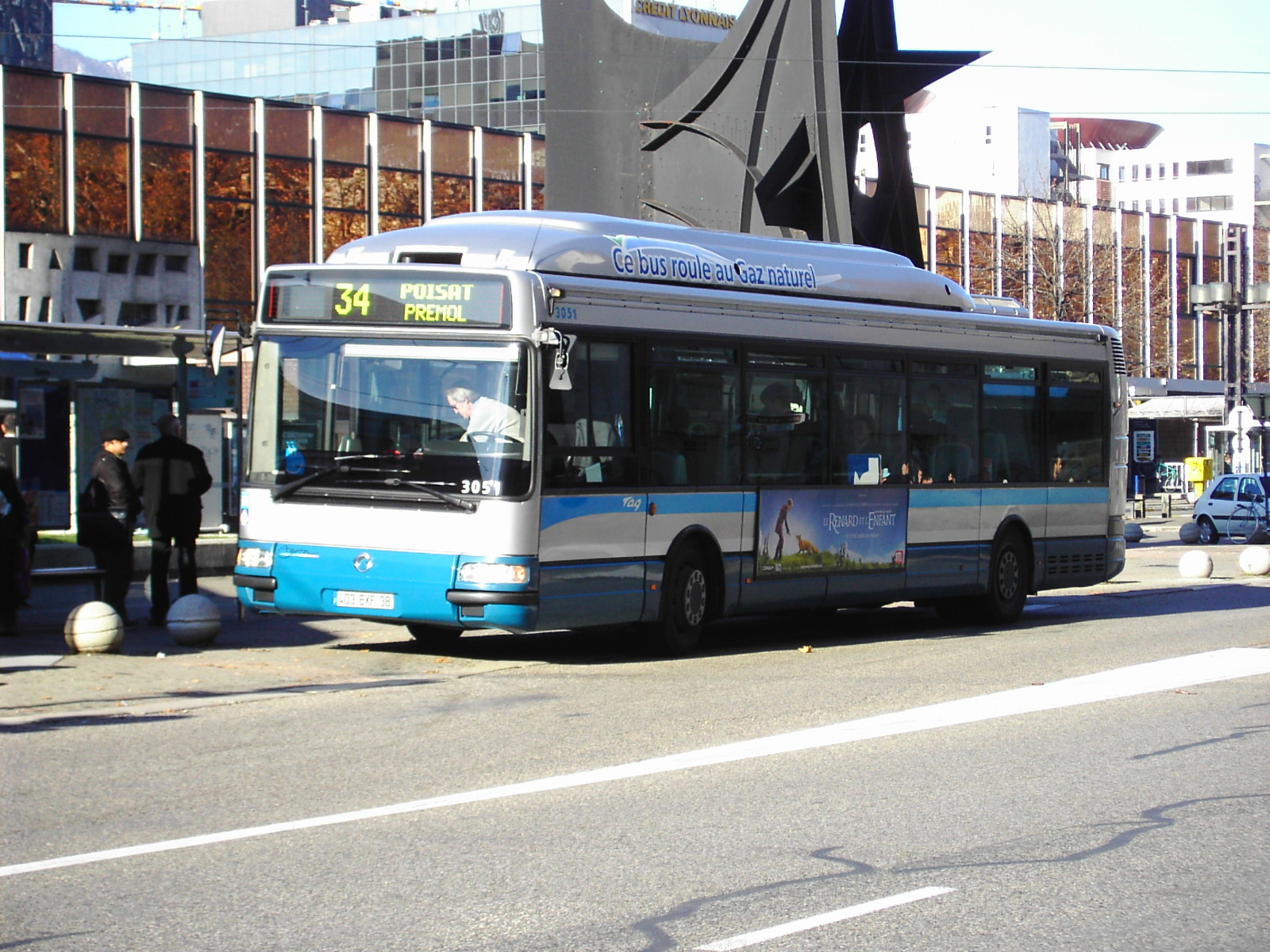
Bus in Grenoble.

In most, if not all, French cities, urban bus services are provided at a flat-rate charge for individual journeys. Many cities have bus services that operate well out into the suburbs or even the country. Fares are normally cheap, but rural services can be limited, especially on weekends.

Trains have long had a monopoly on inter-regional buses, but in 2015 the French government introduced reforms to allow bus operators to travel these routes.

== Waterways and canals ==
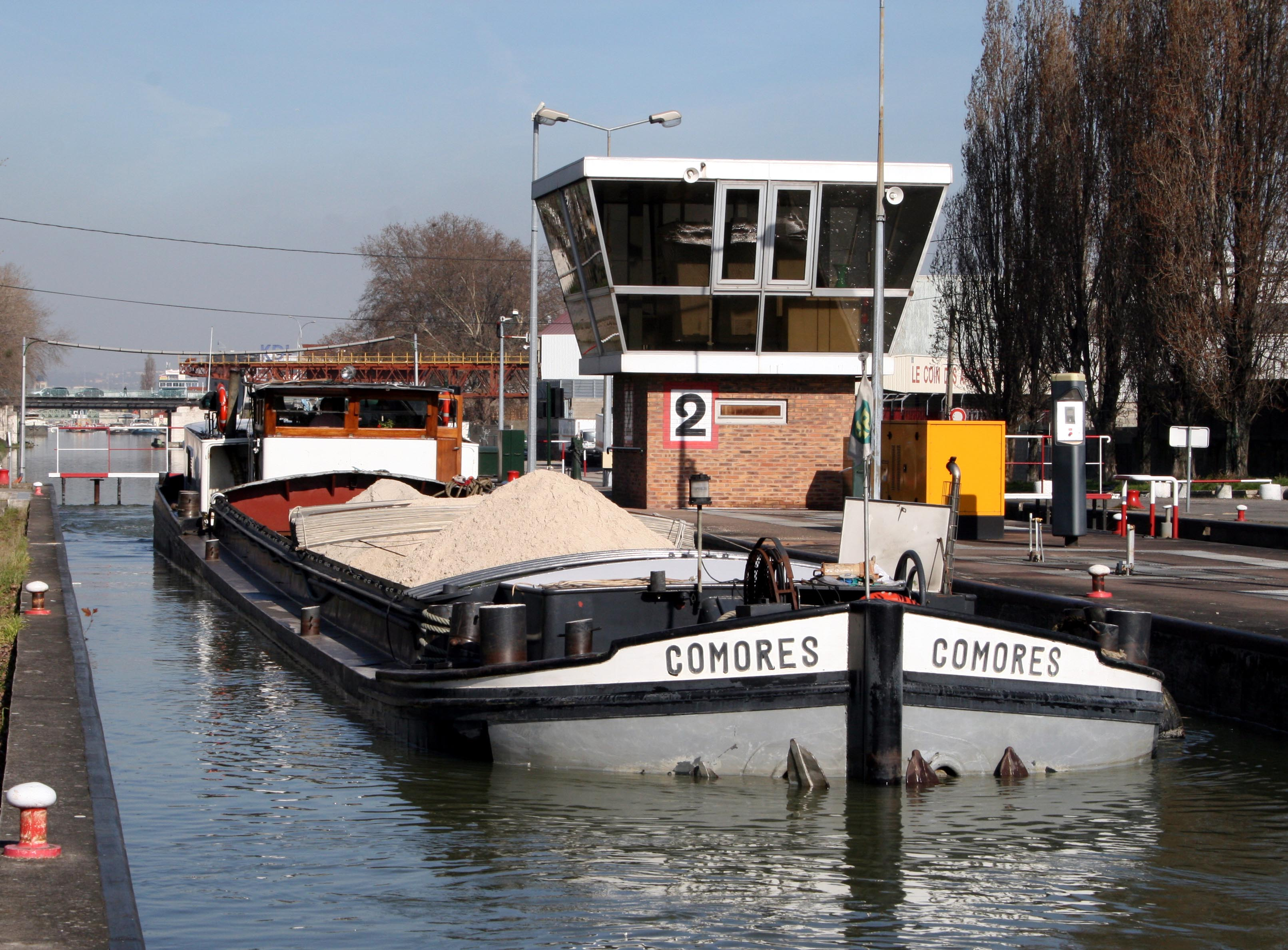
Barge on the Canal Saint-Denis

The French natural and man-made waterways network is the largest in Europe extending to over 8,500 kilometres (5,300 mi) of which (VNF, English: Navigable Waterways of France), the French navigation authority, manages the navigable sections. Some of the navigable rivers include the Loire, Seine and Rhône. The assets managed by VNF comprise 6,700 kilometres (4,200 mi) of waterways, made up of 3,800 kilometres (2,400 mi) of canals and 2,900 kilometres (1,800 mi) of navigable rivers, 494 dams, 1595 locks, 74 navigable aqueducts, 65 reservoirs, 35 tunnels and a land area of 800 km^{2} (310 sq mi). Two significant waterways not under VNF's control are the navigable sections of the River Somme and the Brittany Canals, which are both under local management.

Approximately 20% of the network is suitable for commercial boats of over 1000 tonnes and the VNF has an ongoing programme of maintenance and modernisation to increase depth of waterways, widths of locks and headroom under bridges to support France's strategy of encouraging freight onto water.

== Marine transport ==
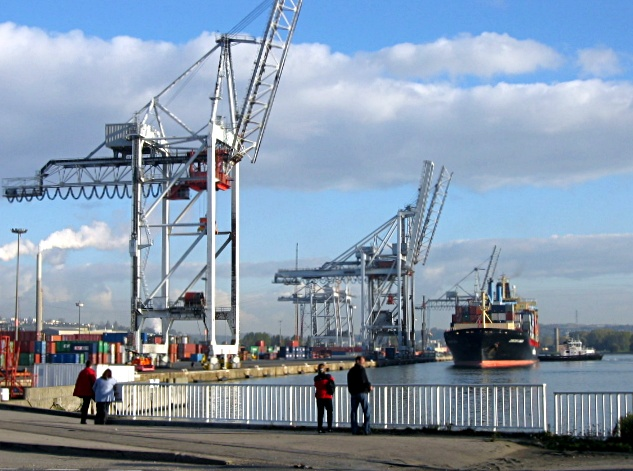
Container terminal at Port of Le Havre

France has an extensive merchant marine, including 55 ships of size Gross register tonnage 1,000 and above. The country also maintains a captive register for French-owned ships in Iles Kerguelen (French Southern and Antarctic Lands).

French companies operate over 1,400 ships of which 700 are registered in France. France's 110 shipping firms employ 12,500 personnel at sea and 15,500 on shore. Each year, 305 million tonnes of goods and 15 million passengers are transported by sea. Marine transport is responsible for 72% of France's imports and exports.

France also has a number of seaports and harbours, including Bayonne, Bordeaux, Boulogne-sur-Mer, Brest, Calais, Cherbourg-Octeville, Dunkirk, Fos-sur-Mer, La Pallice, Le Havre, Lorient, Marseille, Nantes, Nice, Paris, Port-la-Nouvelle, Port-Vendres, Roscoff, Rouen, Saint-Nazaire, Saint-Malo, Sète, Strasbourg and Toulon.

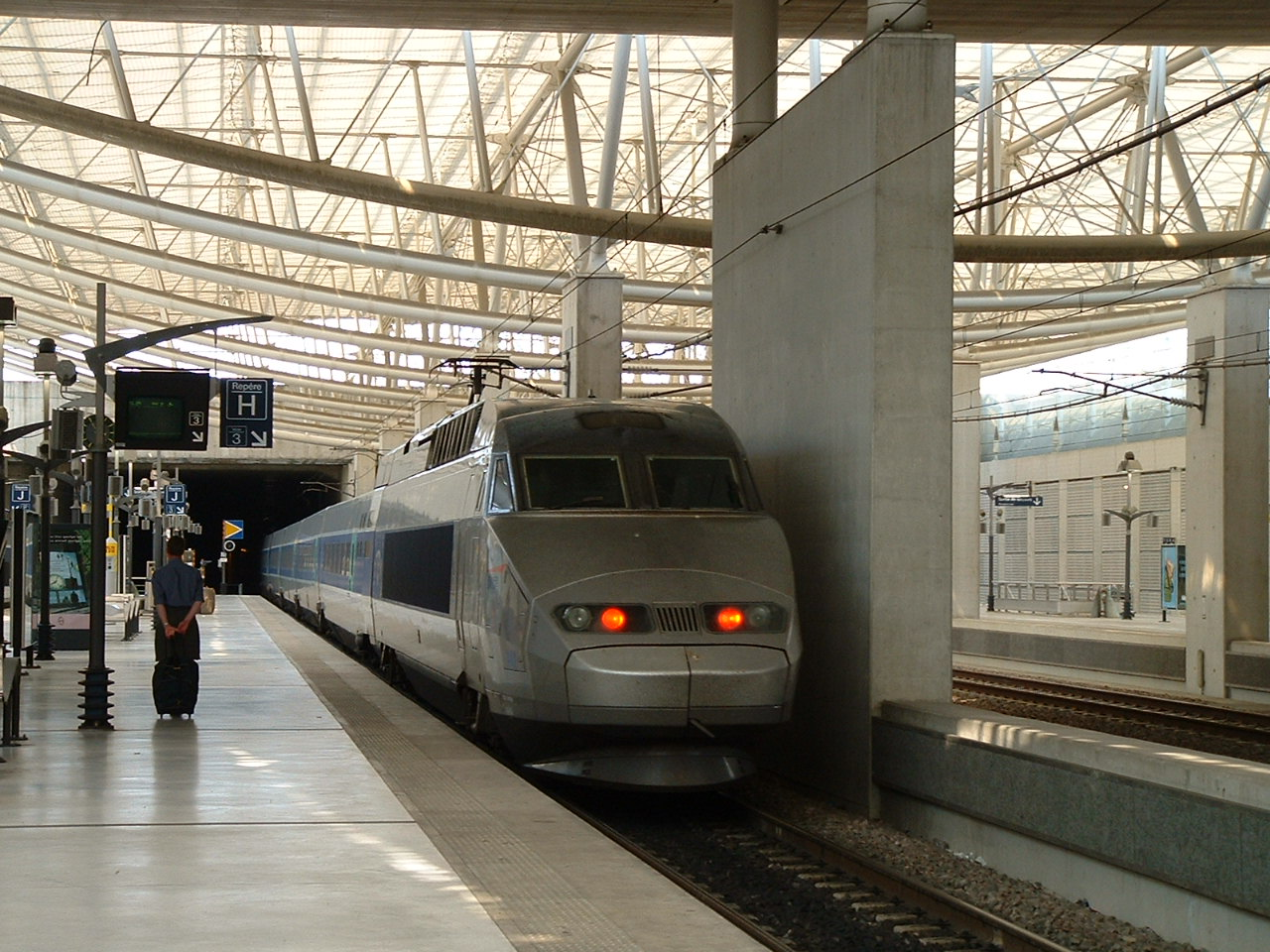
Train station of Aéroport Charles de Gaulle 2 TGV

== Air travel ==
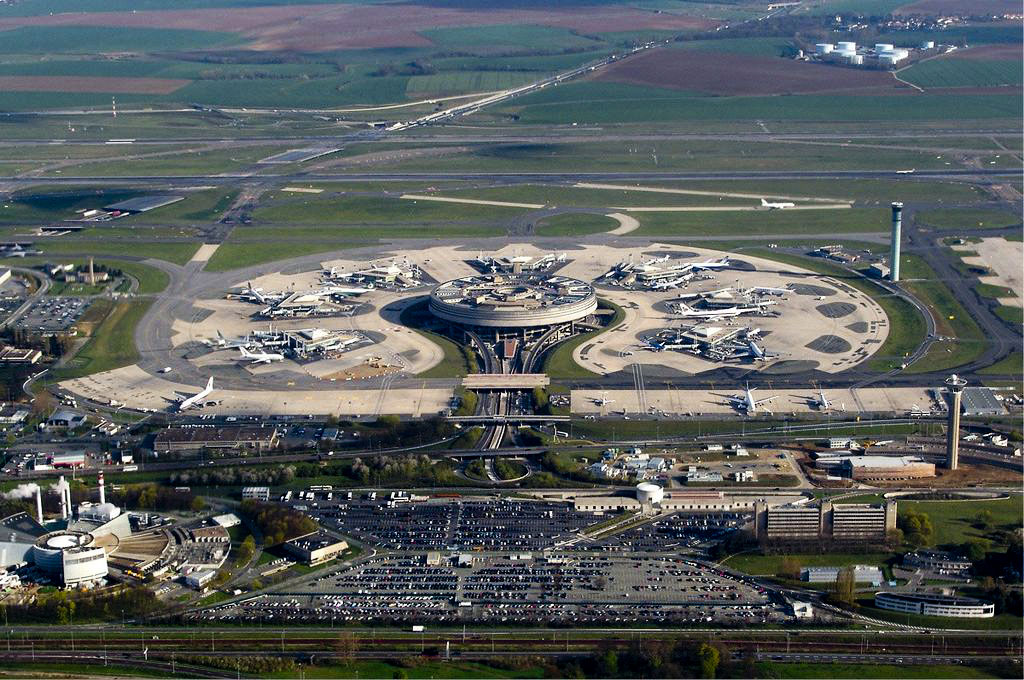
Charles de Gaulle Airport, Paris

There are approximately 478 airports in France (1999 est.) and by a 2005 estimate, there are three heliports. 288 of the airports have paved runways, with the remaining 199 being unpaved.

Among the airspace governance authorities active in France, one is Aéroports de Paris, which has authority over the Paris region, managing 14 airports including the two busiest in France, Charles de Gaulle Airport and Orly Airport. The former, located in Roissy near Paris, is the fifth busiest airport in the world with 60 million passenger movements in 2008, and France's primary international airport, serving over 100 airlines.

The national carrier of France is Air France, a full service global airline which flies to 20 domestic destinations and 150 international destinations in 83 countries (including Overseas departments and territories of France) across all 6 major continents.

== See also ==
- Transport in Besançon
- Réseau Ferré National
- Transport in the European Union
