= Auxon-Dessus =

- Part of Les Auxons
- Location of Auxon-Dessus
- Location within France Location within Bourgogne-Franche-Comté
- Coordinates: 47°18′07″N 5°58′26″E
- Country: France
- Region: Bourgogne-Franche-Comté
- Department: Doubs
- Arrondissement: Besançon
- Canton: Besançon-3
- Commune: Les Auxons
- Area^{1}: 3.88 km^{2} (1.50 sq mi)
- Highest elevation: 350 m (1,150 ft)
- Lowest elevation: 223 m (732 ft)
- Population (2022): 1,120
  - Density: 289/km^{2} (748/sq mi)
- Time zone: UTC+01:00 (CET)
  - Summer (DST): UTC+02:00 (CEST)
- Postal code: 25870
- ^{1} French Land Register data, which excludes lakes, ponds, glaciers > 1 km^{2} (0.386 sq mi or 247 acres) and river estuaries.

Auxon-Dessus (French pronunciation: [oksɔ̃ dəsy]) is a former commune in the Doubs department in the Franche-Comté region in eastern France.

On 1 January 2015, Auxon-Dessus and Auxon-Dessous merged becoming one commune called Les Auxons.

== Population ==
Historical population
| Year | Pop. | ±% p.a. |
|---|---|---|
| 1962 | 138 | — |
| 1968 | 141 | +0.36% |
| 1975 | 265 | +9.43% |
| 1982 | 705 | +15.00% |
| 1990 | 797 | +1.55% |
| 1999 | 740 | −0.82% |
| 2022 | 1,120 | +1.82% |
Source: EHESS and INSEE

== See also ==
- Communes of the Doubs department
