= Auxon-Dessous =

- Part of Les Auxons
- Coat of arms
- Location of Auxon-Dessous
- Location within France Location within Bourgogne-Franche-Comté
- Coordinates: 47°17′58″N 5°57′02″E
- Country: France
- Region: Bourgogne-Franche-Comté
- Department: Doubs
- Arrondissement: Besançon
- Canton: Besançon-3
- Commune: Les Auxons
- Area^{1}: 6.28 km^{2} (2.42 sq mi)
- Highest elevation: 330 m (1,080 ft)
- Lowest elevation: 215 m (705 ft)
- Population (2022): 1,402
  - Density: 223/km^{2} (578/sq mi)
- Time zone: UTC+01:00 (CET)
  - Summer (DST): UTC+02:00 (CEST)
- Postal code: 25870
- ^{1} French Land Register data, which excludes lakes, ponds, glaciers > 1 km^{2} (0.386 sq mi or 247 acres) and river estuaries.

Auxon-Dessous (French pronunciation: [oksɔ̃ dəsu]) is a former commune in the Doubs department in the Franche-Comté region in eastern France.

On 1 January 2015, Auxon-Dessous and Auxon-Dessus merged becoming one commune called Les Auxons.

== Population ==
Historical population
| Year | Pop. | ±% p.a. |
|---|---|---|
| 1962 | 205 | — |
| 1968 | 221 | +1.26% |
| 1975 | 474 | +11.52% |
| 1982 | 762 | +7.02% |
| 1990 | 983 | +3.23% |
| 1999 | 1,096 | +1.22% |
| 2022 | 1,402 | +1.08% |
Source: EHESS and INSEE

== See also ==
- Communes of the Doubs department
