= Besançon – La Vèze Aerodrome =

Besançon - La Vèze Aerodrome Aérodrome de Besançon - La Vèze
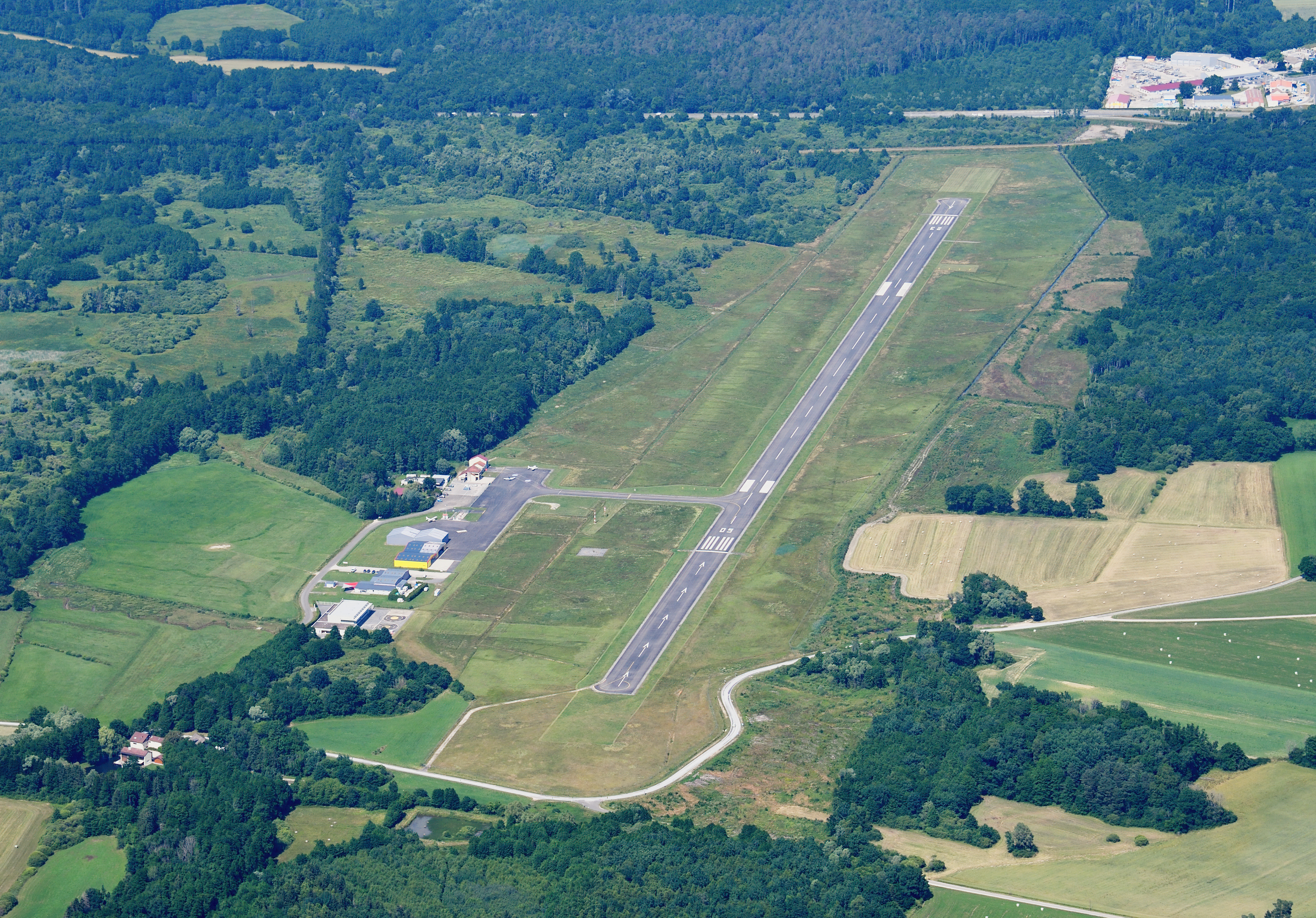
- IATA: none; ICAO: LFQM

Summary
- Airport type: Public
- Operator: CCI Doubs
- Serves: Besançon
- Location: La Vèze, Doubs, France
- Elevation AMSL: 1,271 ft / 387 m
- Coordinates: 47°12′19″N 006°04′50″E
- Interactive map of Besançon - La Vèze Aerodrome

Runways
Direction	Length		Surface
Direction	m	ft	Surface
05/23	1,400	4,593	Asphalt
- Sources: French AIP, UAF, DAFIF

Besançon – La Vèze Aerodrome (French: Aérodrome de Besançon - La Vèze) (ICAO: LFQM) is an airfield located 5.5 km (3.0 NM) southeast of Besançon in La Vèze, both communes of the Doubs department in the Franche-Comté region of France.

== Facilities ==
The airport resides at an elevation of 1,271 feet (387 m) above mean sea level. It has one runway designated 05/23 with an asphalt surface measuring 1,400 by 20 metres (4,593 ft × 66 ft).

== See also ==
- Media related to Aérodrome de Besançon-La Vèze at Wikimedia Commons
