= Les Auxons =

- Commune
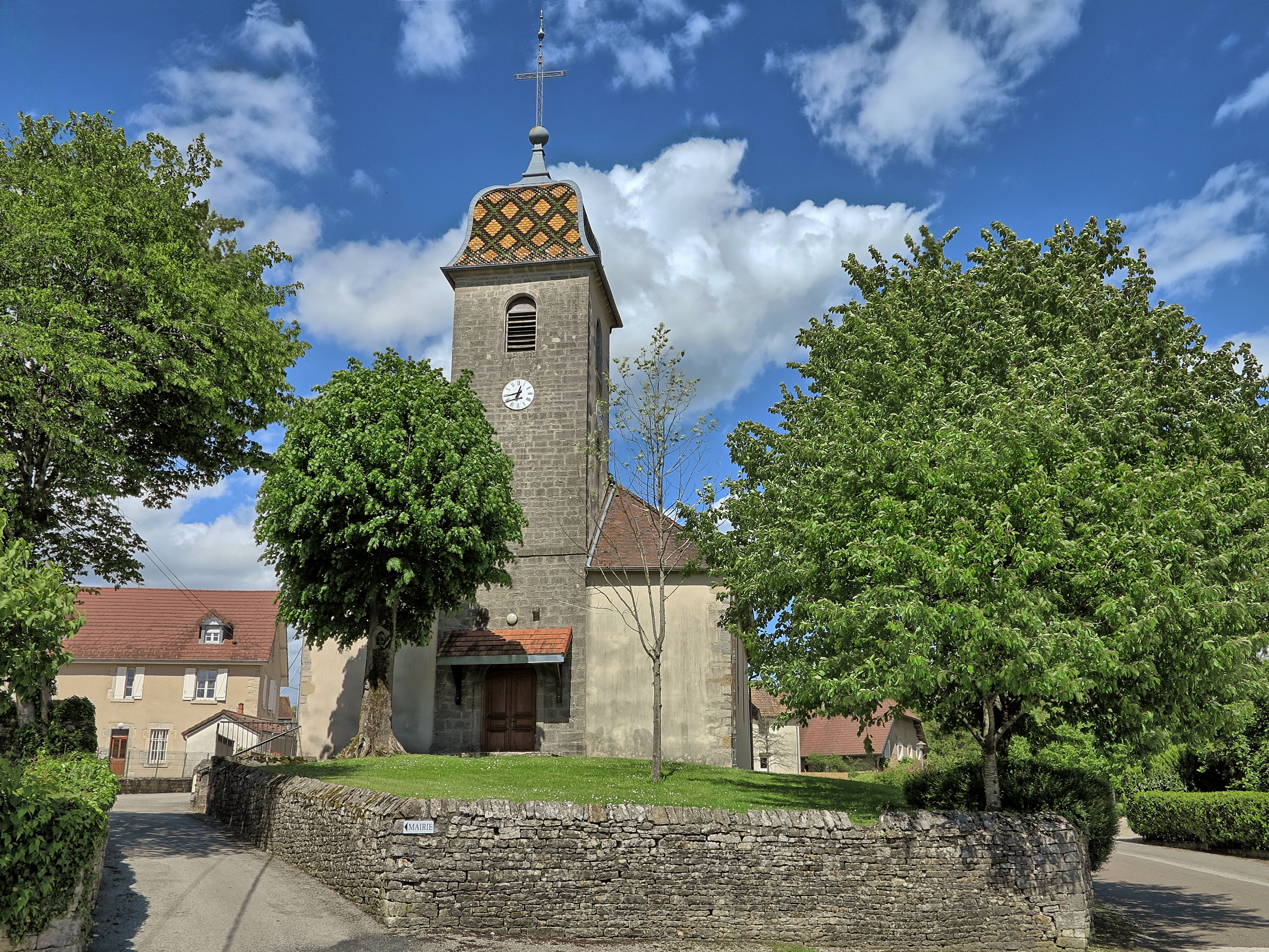
- Saint-Pierre church
- Location of Les Auxons
- Location within France Location within Bourgogne-Franche-Comté
- Coordinates: 47°18′07″N 5°58′26″E
- Country: France
- Region: Bourgogne-Franche-Comté
- Department: Doubs
- Arrondissement: Besançon
- Canton: Besançon-3
- Intercommunality: Grand Besançon Métropole

Government
  - Mayor (2020–2026): Serge Rutkowski
- Area^{1}: 10.16 km^{2} (3.92 sq mi)
- Highest elevation: 350 m (1,150 ft)
- Lowest elevation: 215 m (705 ft)
- Population (2023): 2,533
  - Density: 249.3/km^{2} (645.7/sq mi)
- Time zone: UTC+01:00 (CET)
  - Summer (DST): UTC+02:00 (CEST)
- INSEE/Postal code: 25035 /25870
- ^{1} French Land Register data, which excludes lakes, ponds, glaciers > 1 km^{2} (0.386 sq mi or 247 acres) and river estuaries.

Les Auxons (French pronunciation: [le.z‿oksɔ̃]) is a commune in the Doubs department in the Bourgogne-Franche-Comté region in eastern France. It is the result of the merger, on 1 January 2015, of the communes of Auxon-Dessous and Auxon-Dessus. Besançon Franche-Comté TGV station is situated in the commune.

== Population ==
Population data refer to the commune in its geography as of January 2025.

Historical population
Year	Pop.	±% p.a.
1968	362	—
1975	739	+10.73%
1982	1,467	+10.29%
1990	1,780	+2.45%
1999	1,836	+0.34%
2007	2,248	+2.56%
2012	2,508	+2.21%
2017	2,544	+0.29%
2023	2,533	−0.07%
Source: INSEE

== See also ==
- Communes of the Doubs department
