= Trams in Besançon =

Tram system

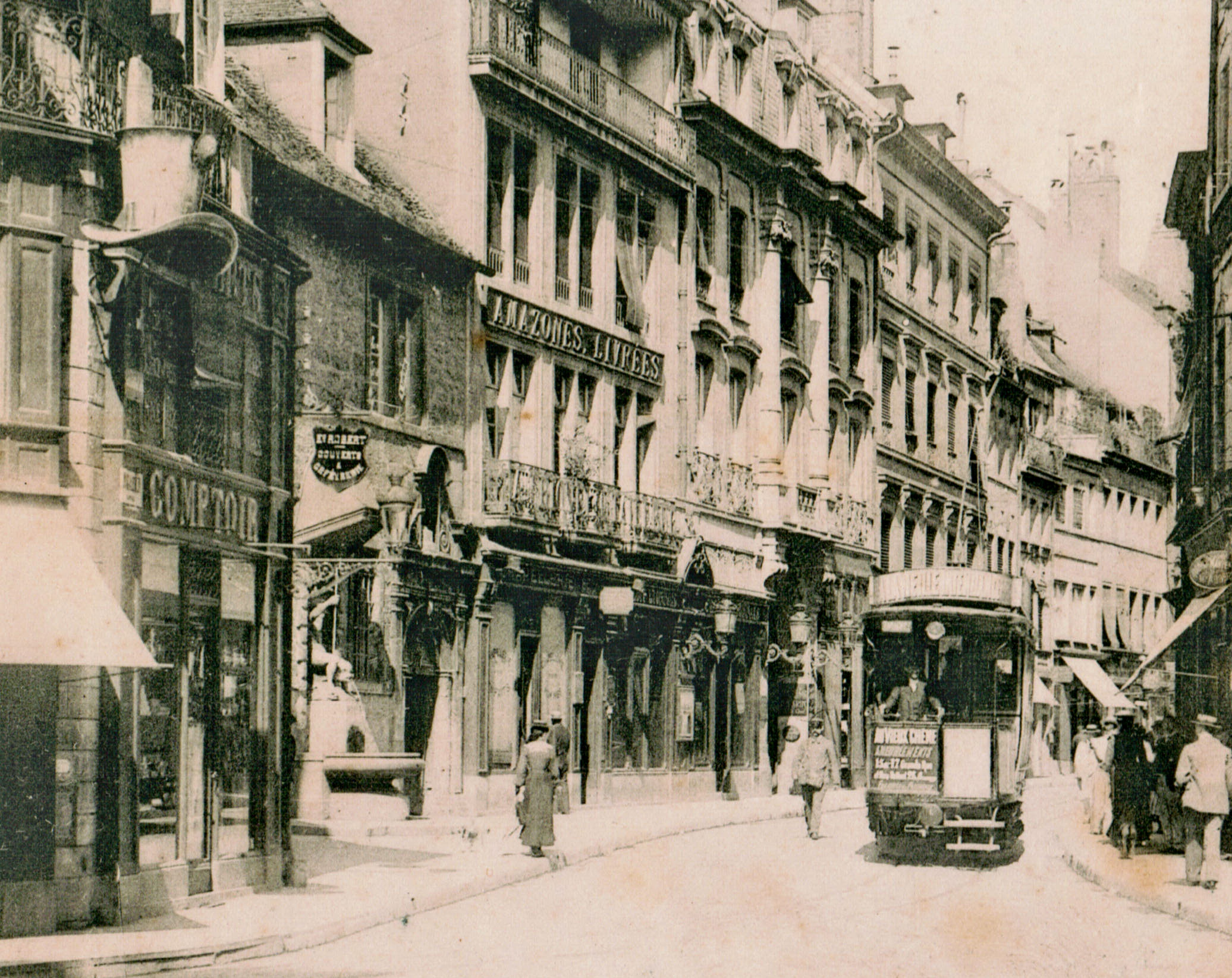
- A tram in the Main Street (Grand Rue) of Besançon (post card 1905)

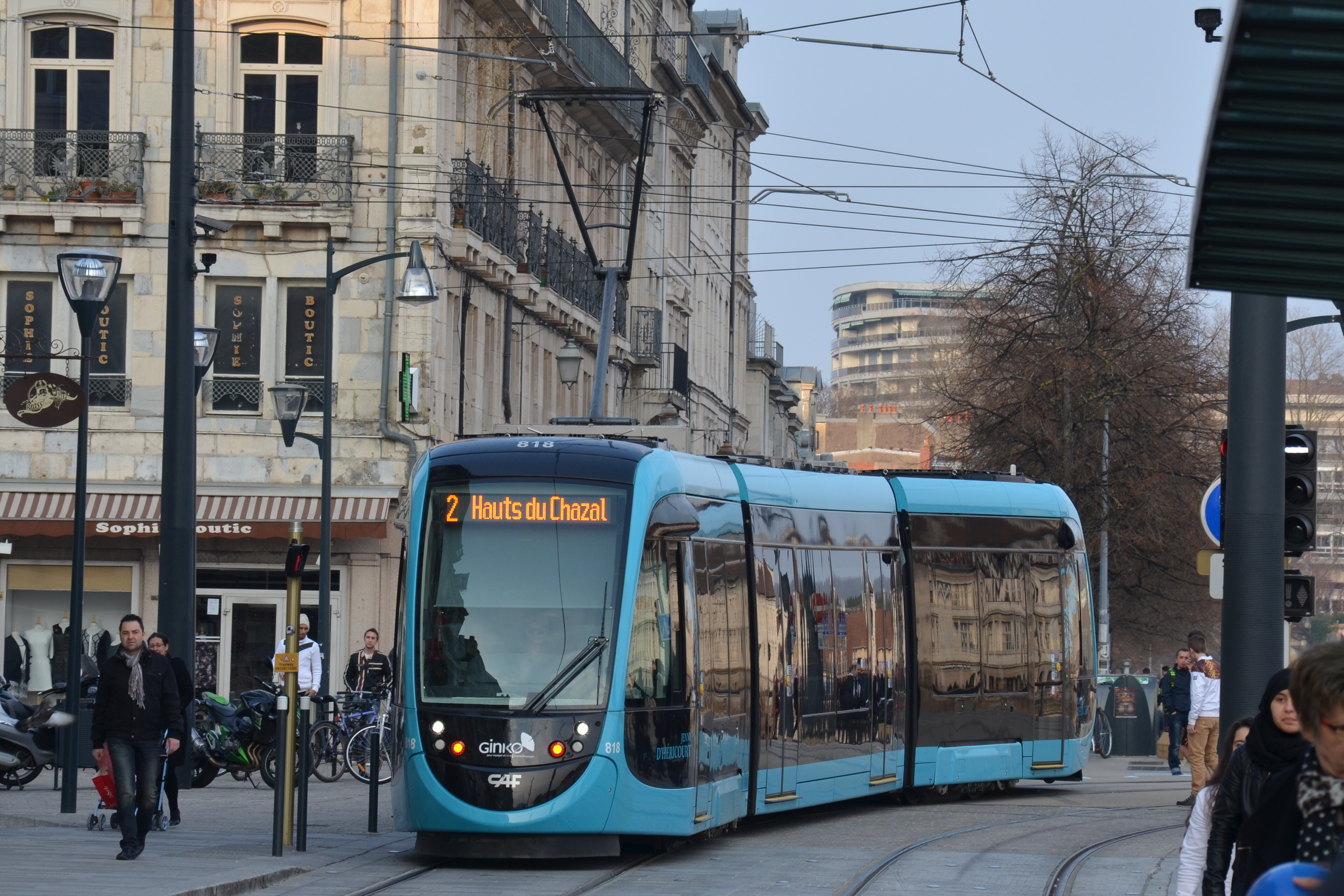
- A CAF Urbos 3 tram at the Battant tram stop in Besançon (2015)

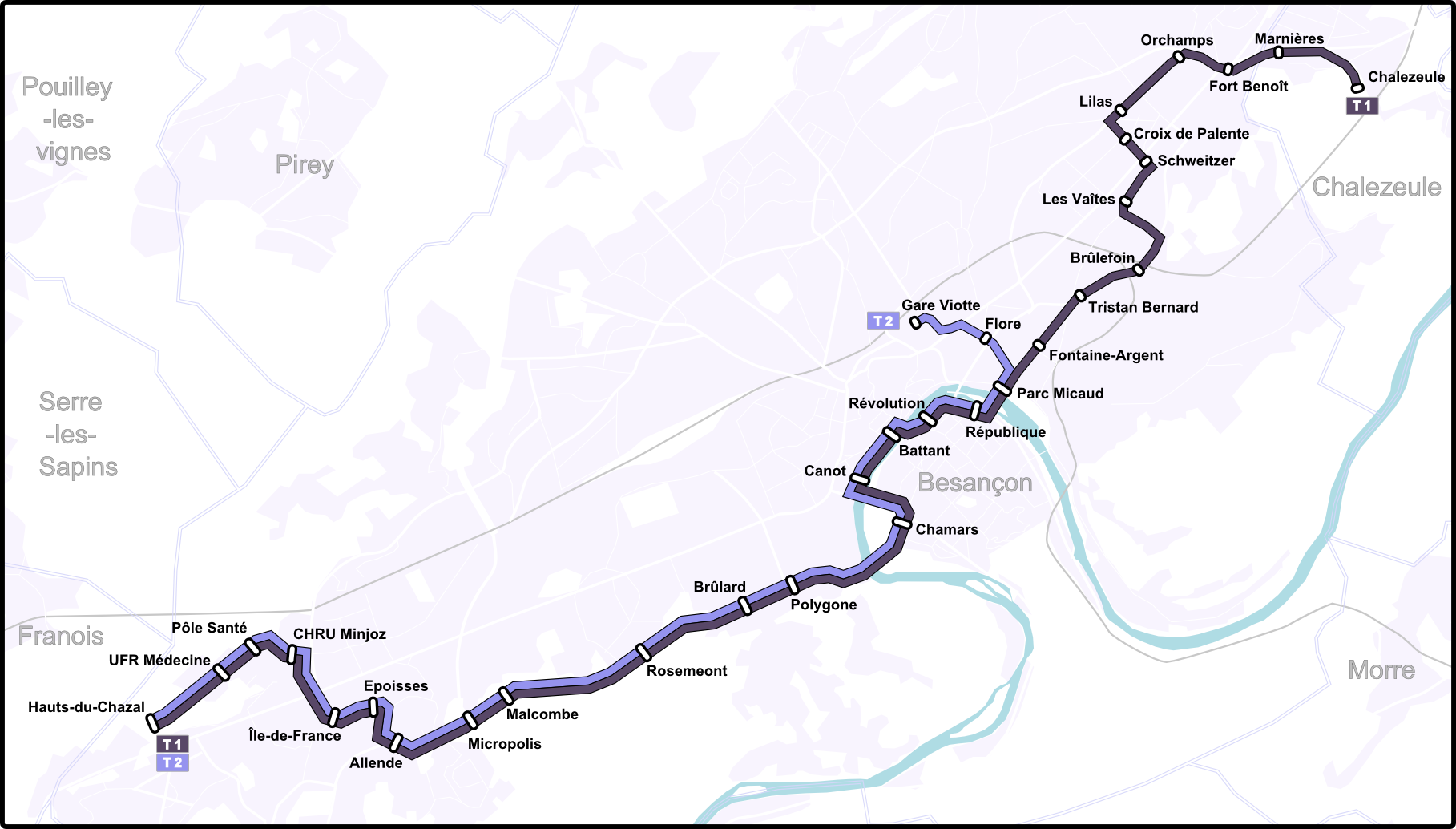
- The Besançon tram network in 2014

Overview
- Locale: Besançon, Doubs, France
- Transit type: Tram network
- Number of lines: 2 (2014)
- Number of stations: 31 (2014)
- Annual ridership: 8.60 million (2018)

Operation
- Began operation: 1896 (narrow gauge electric trams); 2014 (standard gauge electric trams)
- Ended operation: 1952 (narrow gauge electric trams)
- Operators: Société des Tramways électriques de Besançon, aka. TEB (1896–1912); Compagnie Franco-Belge (1912–1952); Ginko (since 2014)
- Number of vehicles: 19 (1900–1913); 19 (since 2014)

Technical
- System length: 11 km (6.8 mi) (1903); 14.5 km (9.0 mi) (2014)
- Track gauge: 1,435 mm (4 ft 8 1/2 in) standard gauge (since 2014)
- Old gauge: 1,000 mm (3 ft 3 3/8 in) metre gauge (1896–1952)
- Electrification: 750 V DC (2014)
- Average speed: 20 km/h (12 mph)
- Top speed: 70 km/h (43 mph)

The Besançon Tram network dated back to a horse tram service inaugurated in 1887. The first two electric tram lines began operating in 1897, joined later by (probably four) more. However, the system, which used only single tracks for its two lines, was badly damaged during World War II from which its finances also emerged in a parlous condition. In 1952, the operation having run out of funding possibilities, the Besançon trams were withdrawn: a city bus service was inaugurated in December 1952.

Following a widely endorsed decision by the city authorities taken in 2005, a new publicly financed two route tram network opened, formally at the end of August 2014, serving the now much enlarged Besançon conglomeration. Although officially organised into two routes, for most of their length the two routes operate on the same track. Another line is scheduled to enter service in 2025.

== History ==
=== Background ===
Besançon had been linked to Dole by rail since 7 April 1856, and since 1 June 1858 also to Belfort following completion of the line along this part of the Doubs valley. The railway station of Besançon-Viotte was located on the north side of the city, however, some distance from the historic city centre. It became a railway junction with the opening on 22 July 1872 of a line to the Swiss frontier at Le Locle. This led to the opening in 1884 of a second station, at Besançon-Mouillère. This monumental structure was located in the eastern part of the city, close to the river.

By the 1880s the population of the city had reached 50,000, and the first public transport service was inaugurated on 3 December 1887. It was commissioned by a man called Charvolin and it connected the station of Besançon-Viotte with the quarter of Tarragnoz, at one edge of the topographically challenging city centre. The route was served by omnibuses and traction was provided by horses. The omnibuses, known as "Rippert coaches" ("Cars Rippert"), featured open platforms at each end. The route was extended to the "Fountain of Flora" ("Fontaine de Flore") in 1893. Surviving archives include complaints about the trams being overcrowded, suggesting that in commercial terms this mode of transport enjoyed some success.

=== First electric tram era ===
In 1894 Alexandre Grammont, an entrepreneurial industrialist, and Edmond Faye, an entrepreneurial banker, applied for a concession to create an electric tram network. A lengthy period of deliberation and negotiation followed. The installation of tramlines would require holes to be made in Besançon's formidable and, in many parts, ancient city fortifications. However, on 26 February 1896 an agreement was signed for the construction of six single-track tram lines, using a 1,000 mm (3 ft 3 3/8 in) metre gauge, and incorporating sufficient passing places. The city's topography called for some sharp turns, several with a radius of only 17 metres (55 ft 9 in), and a number of dauntingly steep slopes. The operating company was to be called the "Besançon Electric Tramway Company" ("Société des Tramways électriques de Besançon" / TEB)

The network was formally endorsed by the authorities on 6 May 1896 which was also when the first stretch of line opened, connecting the city hall with the tram depot in the Rue Isenbart. Lines 1 and 2 entered service on 21 March 1897, operating respectively along the route from the station of Besançon-Viotte to the prefecture, and from the station of Besançon-Viotte to the Rivotte Gate (Porte Rivotte). For 18 April 1897 Line 1 was extended from the prefecture to Tarragnoz and Chaprais. On 27 May 1897 an extension of Line 2 opened from Besançon-Viotte to Sainte-Claude, while Line 1 gained a further extension from Chaprais, across the Canot Bridge ("Pont Canot") to Place Jouffroy. Further extensions followed during the next few years.

In 1903 a new line was agreed, which would connect Besançon (Place Saint-Pierre) and Saint-Ferjeux, then located just outside the city to its west. The TEB also obtained from the authorities consent for the withdrawal of certain loss making services and practical support for the construction of the new line. Line completion, later the same year left the city with a total tram network length of 11 km (6.8 mi).

In 1912 the Compagnie Franco-Belge, which was already running 27 other city tram networks, took over the running of the TEB. Besançon's nineteen tramcars were replaced, and in 1913 the Bregille Funicular was opened.

=== Local narrow-gauge railways ===
Early in the second decade of the twentieth century Besançon also acquired two narrow gauge local steam railway services. One of these, operated by the Compagnie des chemins de fer du Doubs and opened in 1910, was a 29 km (18 mi) service to Amathay-Vésigneux and Pontarlier. The other, opened in 1911, was operated by the Chemins de fer vicinaux de Haute-Saône, servicing a line towards Vesoul. The first of these routes continued in operation till 1951, while the second of them ceased operations in 1938, an early victim of competition from motor buses.

=== During World War II ===
World War II broke out, for France, in 1939, and involved a German invasion in May/June 1940. On 16 June 1940, in order to try and hold back the German attack, all the bridges crossing the Doubs River were destroyed, which permanently amputated a large part of the Besançon tram network. During the period of relative affluence that followed the German invasion part of the transport deficit was made up for using motor buses, but fuel for civilian use was in increasingly short supply and in 1942 the buses were requisitioned by the Germans in order to transport French citizens from the affected regions to Germany for Forced Labour Service. A fire bomb in April 1943 destroyed the bus depot and the maintenance tools and equipment, and on 16 July of the same year the tram depot was destroyed in an air raid.

=== End of the first tram era ===
The war ended in May 1945, which found public transport provision in Besançon a pale shadow of its 1930s self. In 1947 the company, which was already facing financial catastrophe, was required by government decree to lower fares. A complete reorganisation of transit took place in 1948. In 1952 buses returned to the streets, and their arrival was accompanied, on 24 December 1952, by the ending of operations on the tram network, which had simply run out of resources.

== Modern tram system (since 2014) ==
=== Finance ===
The capital cost of the first line was estimated at €228 million, equivalent to a cost of €16 million per kilometer, and was completed at a cost of €254m or €17.5m per km. 50% of the funding came from a loan, and a further 25% from subsidies. €20 million of those subsidies were provided by the city and a further €30 million from the national government (Environment forum). The balancing 25% comes from a variety of other sources. The costs have been minimised by consciously avoiding complexity at the design stage and using standard tramcars without requiring a succession of adaptations to "meet local requirements".

=== Network ===
The line length is 14.5 km (9.0 mi) and it serves 31 tram halts. The Hauts-de-Chazal quarter is linked to Chaprais via the city centre. Alternate trams travel not to Chaprais, but instead follow a short branch line to Besançon-Viotte station. There are five park-and-ride car parks served, which together offer parking for 630 cars. There is talk of increasing car parking capacity to 1030. A southern extension to the existing line is envisioned, and a new line, planned for 2025, is to link Chalezeule with the Technology Park to the west of Besançon-Viotte.

=== Infrastructure ===
The new network uses a 750 V direct current overhead power supply and a standard gauge. The standard gauge was chosen, despite the topographical challenges presented by the city, in order to be ready for some possible future tram-train project that might involve integrating a recreated local train network into the city tram system. Almost the entire length of the line uses a twin track except for a short section between the Schweitzer and Lilas tram halts. On a few other short sections the trams share the street with other road traffic.

The new line crosses the river four times, and required a rebuild for the Battant Bridge ("Pont Battant"). A large depot, covering 47,000 m^{2}, was scheduled for completion in 2014 at Franois, at the western end of the line. Trams are to be kept out of doors, but a large covered workshop covering 6,500 m^{2} is scheduled to become fully operational in 2015.

=== Ridership ===
The network is designed to take 50,000 passengers daily, with an expected level of 47,000 from the start of operations. At peak hours 1,200 people are expected to use the trams each hour, and during periods of maximum demand the trams will be scheduled to run at intervals of five minutes.

=== Operations ===
The tram is operational daily from 5 AM to 1 AM. The average speed is 20 km/h with a maximum speed of 70 km/h. Commissioning of the trams was accompanied by an extensive reconfiguring of the Besançon bus network, all under the control of "Ginko", the city's public transportation provider.

=== Tramcars ===
==== CAF trams ====
Following a tendering process, the Spanish tram manufacturer CAF won the contract to provide and maintain 19 low floor Urbos 3 tramsets. The contract value was €34.4 million, equivalent to €1.81 million per tram. The first tram was delivered in June 2013, and subjected to a range of tests. In order to obtain and type operating certificate, the first tram was required to complete 10,000 test kilometres, which was expected to have been completed by July 2014. Driver training started in January 2014 and all the trams had been delivered to Besançon by March 2014. The individual trams were required to complete 500 km each before being certificated for public service.

Each tramset is 23 m (75 ft) long and 2.4 m (94 in) wide, with space for 132 passengers. Only 38 of the passengers are able to sit on a seat, however. Each tram has four sets of access/exit doors. The first tram was built at the manufacturer's facility in Zaragoza. The rest of them were scheduled to be assembled in France by Soulé.

The 23-metre trams proved to be too small. There was the possibility of lengthening each tram by adding middle sections to a length of 30 to 32 m (98–105 ft). However, this was found to be technically difficult and expensive. Thus, longer trams were ordered from Alstom.

==== Alstom trams ====
In 2023, the cities of Besançon, Brest and Toulouse jointly ordered a minimum of 22 Citadis trams from Alstom as part of an eight-year contract. In 2023, Grand Besançon Métropole ordered five trams, and three more in April 2025. Five trams were scheduled to be delivered to Besançon by autumn 2025, the first of which arrived on 25 June 2025. The tram components are built at nine Alstom sites within France.

The five-section trams are 32.5 m (107 ft) long and 2.4 m (7 ft 10 in) wide. Each side of the tram has four 1.3 m (4 ft 3 in) wide double doors and two single doors. The trams can hold up to 201 passengers. The trams have reserved areas for wheelchairs and prams. Door opening buttons are located at a convenient height for wheelchair users. Trams have air conditioning and real-time information displays. Alstom claims that the Citadis trams will use 25 percent less energy than the CAF trams. The trams will be 95 percent recyclable at the end of their 30-year operating life.

== See also ==
- Transport in Besançon
