= La Vèze =

- Commune
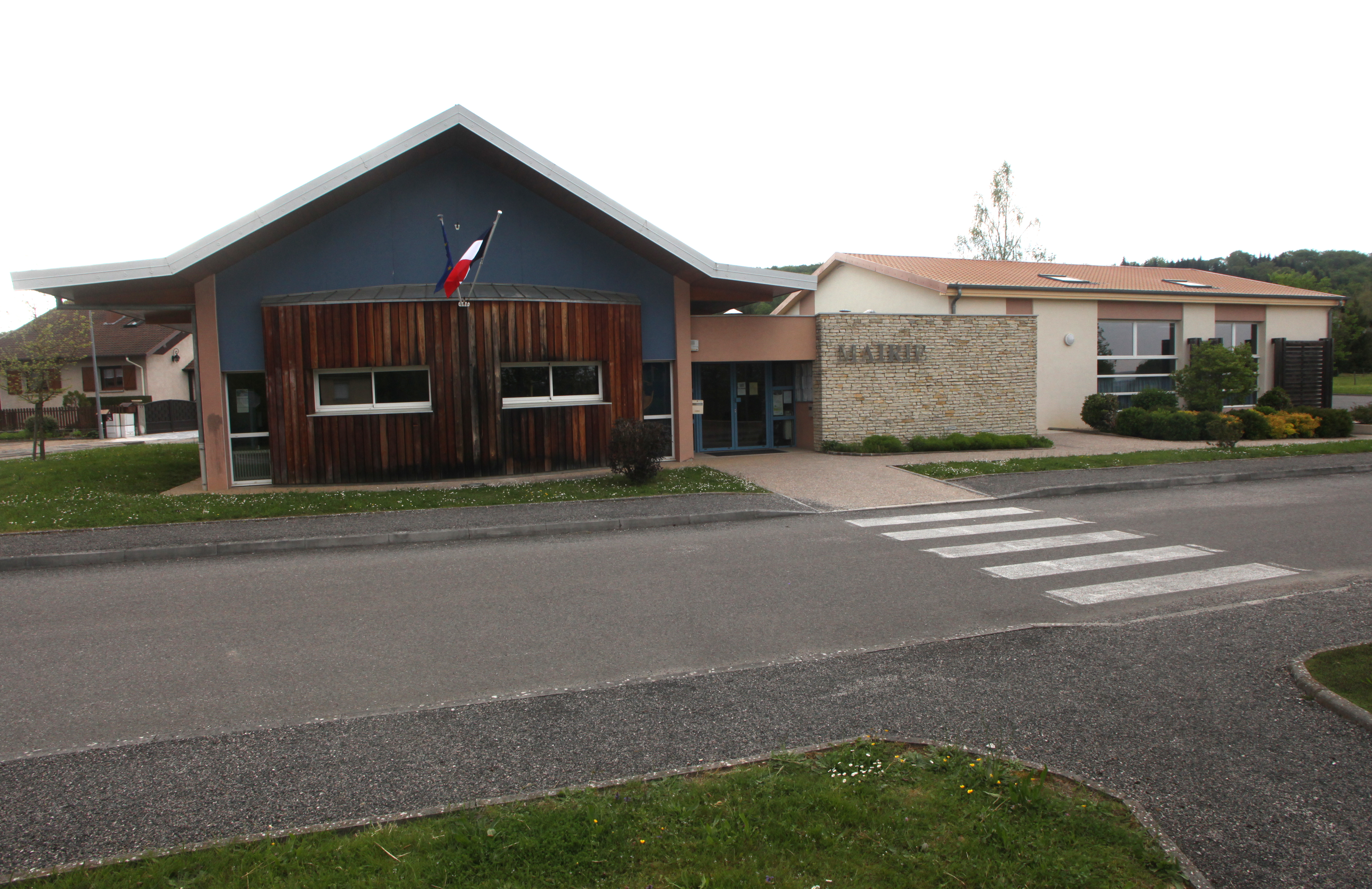
- The town hall in La Vèze
- Location of La Vèze
- Location within France Location within Bourgogne-Franche-Comté
- Coordinates: 47°12′42″N 6°04′06″E
- Country: France
- Region: Bourgogne-Franche-Comté
- Department: Doubs
- Arrondissement: Besançon
- Canton: Besançon-5
- Intercommunality: Grand Besançon Métropole

Government
  - Mayor (2020–2026): Jean-Pierre Jannin
- Area^{1}: 5.27 km^{2} (2.03 sq mi)
- Highest elevation: 470 m (1,540 ft)
- Lowest elevation: 386 m (1,266 ft)
- Population (2023): 493
  - Density: 93.5/km^{2} (242/sq mi)
- Time zone: UTC+01:00 (CET)
  - Summer (DST): UTC+02:00 (CEST)
- INSEE/Postal code: 25611 /25660
- ^{1} French Land Register data, which excludes lakes, ponds, glaciers > 1 km^{2} (0.386 sq mi or 247 acres) and river estuaries.

La Vèze (French pronunciation: [la vɛz]) is a commune in the Doubs department in the Bourgogne-Franche-Comté region in eastern France.

== Population ==
Historical population
Year	Pop.	±% p.a.
1968	244	—
1975	273	+1.62%
1982	368	+4.36%
1990	400	+1.05%
1999	437	+0.99%
2007	441	+0.11%
2012	433	−0.37%
2017	455	+1.00%
2023	493	+1.35%
Source: INSEE

== See also ==
- Communes of the Doubs department
