= Seloncourt =

- Commune
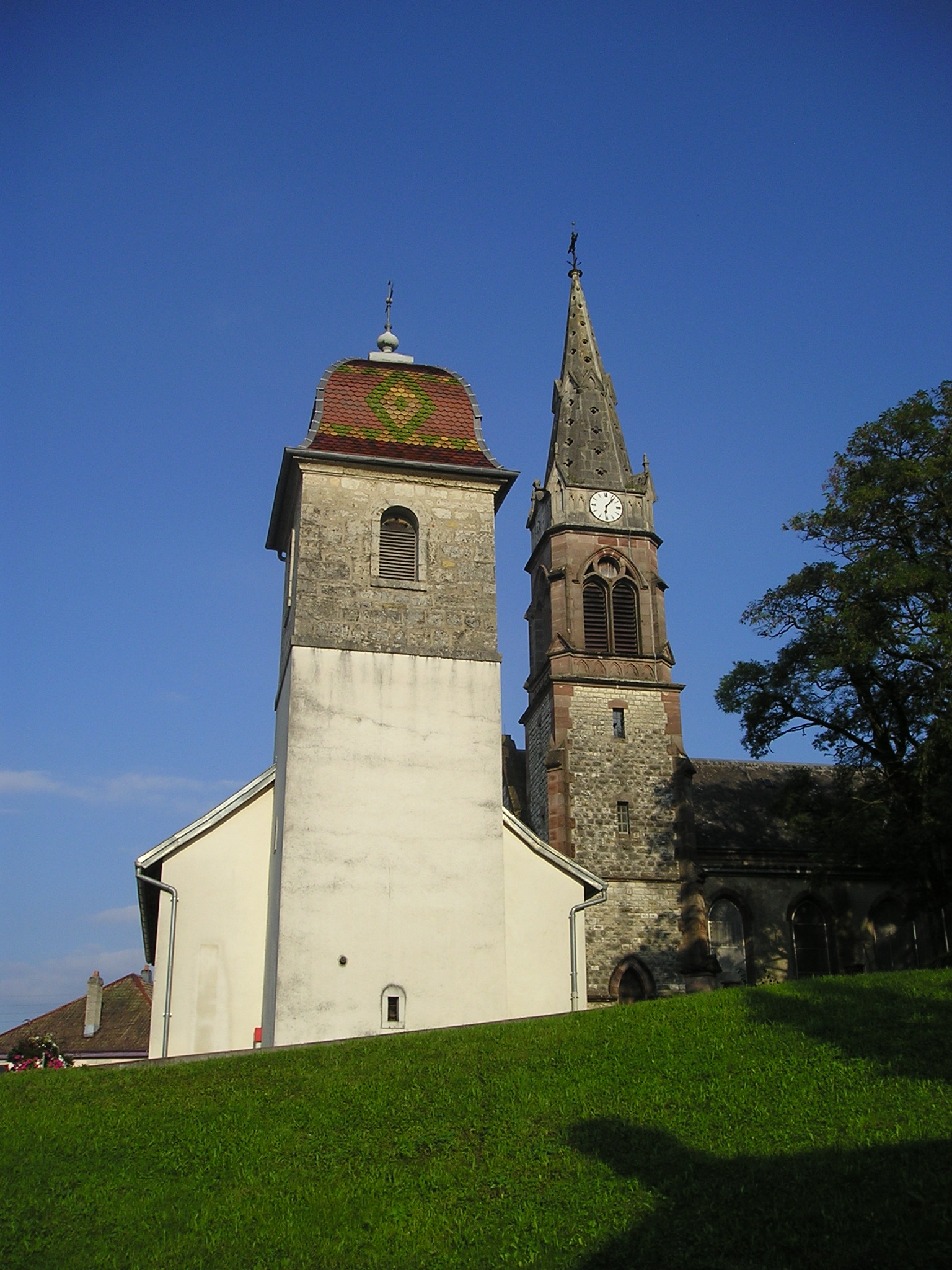
- The church in Seloncourt

- Coat of arms
- Location of Seloncourt
- Location within France Location within Bourgogne-Franche-Comté
- Coordinates: 47°27′41″N 6°51′32″E
- Country: France
- Region: Bourgogne-Franche-Comté
- Department: Doubs
- Arrondissement: Montbéliard
- Canton: Audincourt
- Intercommunality: Pays de Montbéliard Agglomération

Government
  - Mayor (2020–2026): Daniel Buchwalder
- Area^{1}: 7.92 km^{2} (3.06 sq mi)
- Highest elevation: 483.5 m (1,586 ft)
- Lowest elevation: 330 m (1,080 ft)
- Population (2023): 5,854
  - Density: 739/km^{2} (1,910/sq mi)
- Time zone: UTC+01:00 (CET)
  - Summer (DST): UTC+02:00 (CEST)
- INSEE/Postal code: 25539 /25230
- ^{1} French Land Register data, which excludes lakes, ponds, glaciers > 1 km^{2} (0.386 sq mi or 247 acres) and river estuaries.

Seloncourt (French pronunciation: [səlɔ̃kuʁ]; Frainc-Comtou: Sloncouét) is a commune in the Doubs department in the Bourgogne-Franche-Comté region in eastern France.

== Geography ==
Seloncourt lies 10 km (6.2 mi) from Montbéliard on the banks of the Gland, which flows into the Doubs at Audincourt. It is only 10 km (6.2 mi) from Switzerland.

== History ==
The name of Seloncourt appears for the first time in 1170 in a deed of gift of a meix (House) made by Valner and Damjustin with the Abbey of Belchamp, but certainly existed well before this date. Seloncourt belonged to the Count of Montbéliard since the creation of the fortified city of Montbéliard. It was separated in 1282, to enter, by constitution, in the Seigniory (Lordship) of Blamont until the reintegration of this Seigniory into the Count of Montbéliard and finally in the Canton of Hérimoncourt created by decree May 12, 1898.

Seloncourt was under the rule of the County of Württemberg beginning in 1397. During the province's allegiance to the Württemberg it embraced Lutheranism. In 1588 there were 24 families and 116 inhabitants in Seloncourt. Seloncourt was reattached to France in 1793 after the French Revolution.

== Economy ==
Seloncourt was a center of watchmaking in the 18th and 19th centuries. Firms located here included Frères Beurnier.

== Population ==
Historical population
| Year | Pop. | ±% p.a. |
|---|---|---|
| 1968 | 5,308 | — |
| 1975 | 5,268 | −0.11% |
| 1982 | 5,545 | +0.73% |
| 1990 | 5,613 | +0.15% |
| 1999 | 5,746 | +0.26% |
| 2007 | 5,922 | +0.38% |
| 2012 | 5,938 | +0.05% |
| 2017 | 5,775 | −0.56% |
| 2023 | 5,854 | +0.23% |
Source: INSEE

== Personalities ==
Seloncourt was the birthplace of:

- George David Coulon, artist
- Henri Fertet (1926–1943), French Resistance fighter, born in Seloncourt
- Élisabeth Renaud (1846–1932), co-founder, Groupe Feministe Socialiste

== Internal relations ==
Seloncourt is twinned with:

- Villongo, Italy

== See also ==
- Communes of the Doubs department
