= Pierre Julitte =

Pierre Julitte (1910, Chevannes, Essonne – 1991) was a French engineer, writer, and member of the resistance during World War II. A prisoner at Buchenwald concentration camp, he recollected his camp experiences in a book titled for the camp's so-called Goethe Oak, L'Arbre de Goethe (1965).

== Awards and decorations ==
France

- Legion of Honour
- Order of Liberation
- Croix de guerre 1939–1945 (France) (5 citations)
- Resistance Medal
- Volunteer combatant's cross
- Order of Agricultural Merit
- 1939–1945 Commemorative war medal (France)

Great-Britain

- Order of the British Empire

Luxemburg

- Order of the Oak Crown
