= Élisabeth Renaud =

French teacher, socialist activist and feminist

- Born: August 8, 1846; Seloncourt Doubs, France
- Died: October 15, 1932; 13th arrondissement of Paris, France
- Occupation(s): teacher, socialist activist, feminist
- Known for: co-founder, Groupe Feministe Socialiste

Élisabeth Renaud (August 8, 1846 – October 15, 1932), was a French teacher, socialist activist, and feminist.

== Early life ==
Catherine Émilie Renaud was born in Seloncourt (Doubs), August 8, 1846. She came from a Protestant working class background. In 1870, she obtained the brevet de capacité thanks to her employment at the Famille Japy factory. She then became a governess in an aristocratic family in Saint Petersburg.

== Activism ==
Renaud took part in the national congress of the French Workers' Party in July 1897. In L'Humanité nouvelle for March and April 1898, she wrote an article on "La Femme au XXe siècle" based on a lecture she gave on October 28, 18972. She stated, for example, that:— "The feminists worthy of the name work to solve the social question by putting the woman, whom centuries of a depressing education have inferiorized, in a condition to take her place in a new society."

In 1899, Louise Saumoneau and Élisabeth Renaud created the Groupe Feministe Socialiste (GFS) following the death of Aline Valette. The GFS manifesto was signed by four women, all from modest backgrounds, who associated their trades with their names: Louise Saumoneau (seamstress), Élisabeth Renaud (teacher), Estelle Mordelet and Florestine Malseigne (tailors). The GFS manifesto protested the "double oppression of women, exploited on a large scale by capitalism, subject to men by laws and especially by prejudice." GFS experienced some strife in the form of conflict between its two founders, who had had their differences from the beginning. Renaud's goals were conciliatory; she hoped to bridge the gap between socialism and bourgeois feminism. Saumoneau, on the other hand, hated the bourgeois feminists, feeling that they were irrevocably out of touch with the realities of the working class. In 1902, Renaud left the party.

In September 1899, in the middle of the Dreyfus affair, this group militated in favor of Alfred Dreyfus.

== Personal life ==
In 1881, she married a printer who died in 1886, leaving her a widow with her two children. Their daughter, Émilie Baduel, became a teacher and married Léo Guesde in April 1908.

Élisabeth Renaud died in the 13th arrondissement of Paris, October 15, 1932.
