= Citadel of Besançon =

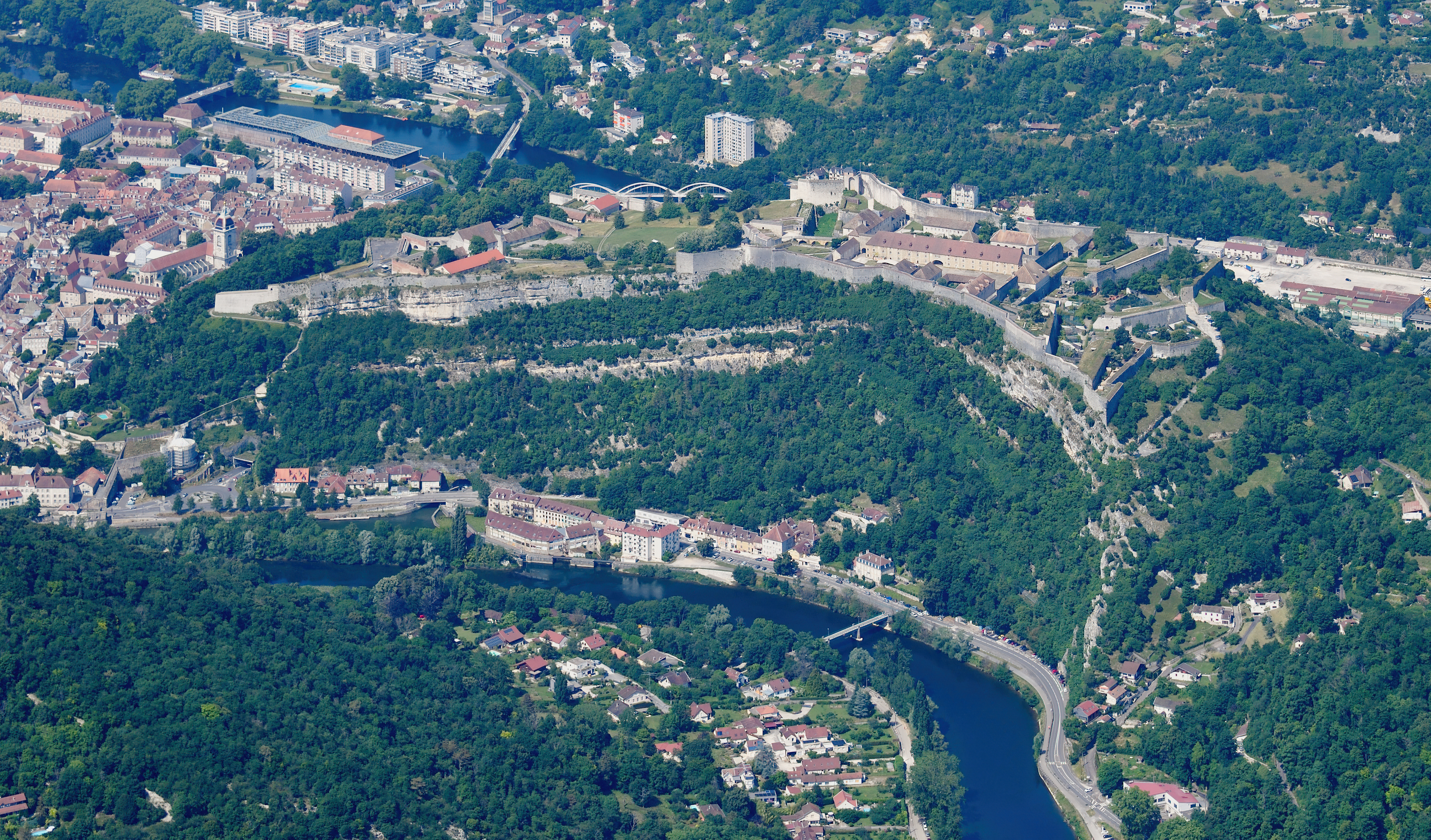
- The Citadel, aerial view
- Interactive map of the Citadel of Besançon area

General information
- Location: Besançon, France
- Coordinates: 47.2294°N 6.0346°E
- Construction started: 1668
- Client: City of Besançon
- Owner: City of Besançon

Technical details
- Size: 11 hectares (27 acres)

Design and construction
- Architect: Vauban

The Citadel of Besançon (French: Citadelle de Besançon, pronounced [sitadɛl də bəzɑ̃sɔ̃]) is a 17th-century fortress in Franche-Comté, France. It is one of the finest masterpieces of military architecture designed by Sébastien Le Prestre de Vauban. The Citadel occupies 11 hectares (27 acres) on Mount Saint-Etienne, one of the seven hills that protect Besançon, the capital of Franche-Comté. Mount Saint-Etienne occupies the neck of an oxbow formed by the river Doubs, giving the site a strategic importance that Julius Caesar recognised as early as 58 BC. The Citadel overlooks the old quarter of the city, which is located within the oxbow, and has views of the city and its surroundings.

The fortification is well preserved. Today it is an important tourist site (over a quarter of a million visitors per year) due both to its own characteristics and because it is the site of several museums. These museums include a museum of the Resistance and deportation, a museum focusing on traditional life in Franche-Comté and the region's archeological history, and a museum of natural history that includes a zoo, an insectarium, an aquarium, vivariums, a noctarium, a climatorium, a pedagogical exhibit on evolution, botanical gardens, and a children's farm. There is also a restaurant and shops.

On 7 July 2008, UNESCO listed the Citadel, together with nearby Fort Griffon, as a World Heritage Site for its testimony to Vauban's work and its influence in the design of military fortifications and strategy from the 17th through 20th centuries. Since 1942, the French Ministry of Culture has listed the Citadel as a Monument historique.

The citadel of Besançon is today the symbol of the city and a high place of tourism in Bourgogne-Franche-Comté, the third paying monument in the region in terms of attendance with 200,000 to 300,000 visitors each year.

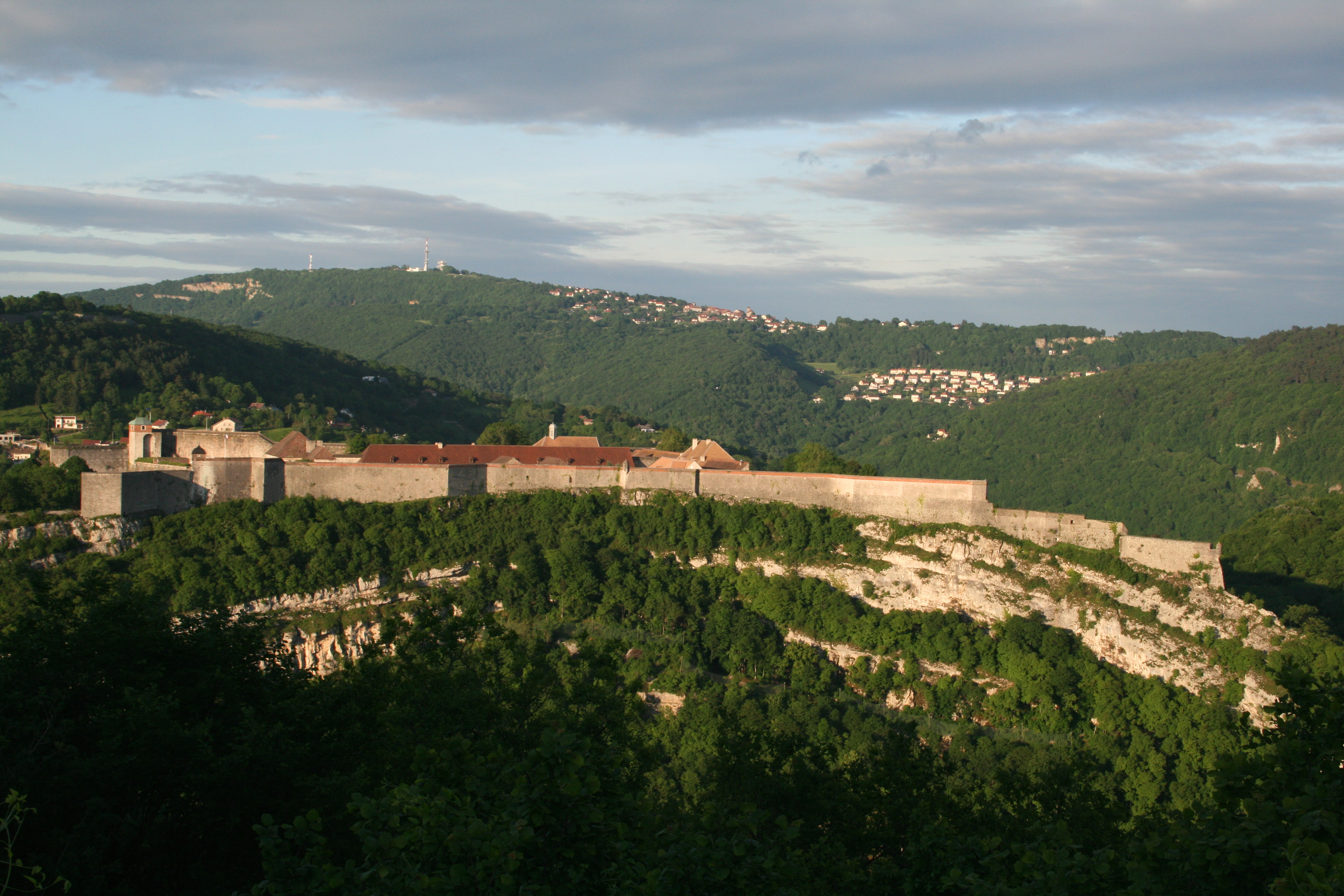
Southwest view of the citadel

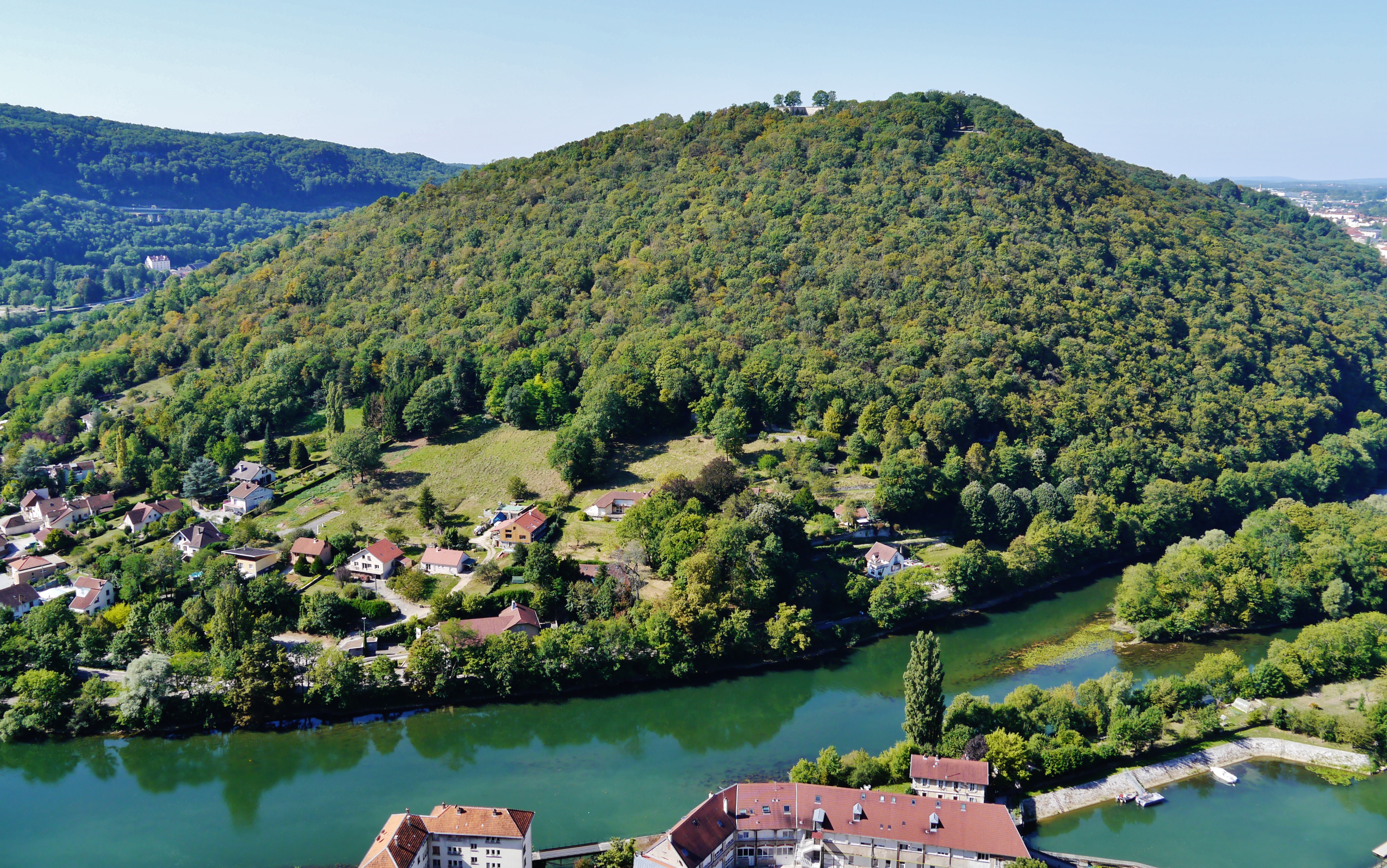
View from the citadel across the River Doubs

== Early history ==
In Gallo-Roman times the promontory on which the citadel sits was already used as an acropolis. A wall enclosed a temple, probably dedicated to Jupiter Capitolinus. (Reference to the Roman history of the town is preserved in the town's arms, which show an eagle clasping two Roman columns in its claws.) The fortifications were renovated during the Middle Ages and again in the 16th century.

Some columns of the Roman temple survive to the present in the area between the Saint Stephen's Front and the Royal Front. Where Saint Stephen's Front, which Vauban built, now stands, there was once a cathedral dedicated to Saint Stephen. The cathedral and its cloister dated back to the 5th century, and received further work in the 11th, 13th and 14th centuries.

== Construction (1668-1711) ==
Between 1668 and 1672, the Spaniards started to construct a modern citadel on the site. Some of the buildings they constructed were incorporated into the subsequent enlargement of the Citadel. The Royal Front (Front meaning bastion or enclosure), and the Relief Front, both include buildings that the Spaniards erected.

The Treaty of Nijmegen in 1678, gave the region of Franche-Comté to Louis XIV, who decided to improve significantly the city of Besançon's defences. In March 1668 Louis appointed the military architect Vauban to design the Citadel. The initial construction, which took place under the supervision of Ambrose Precipiano, took six years. Work continued over thirty years with the result that by 1711, the Citadel was one of the strongest fortifications of the period. The construction was so expensive that – so the story goes – the king asked Vauban if he was building the walls of gold.

== Military architecture ==
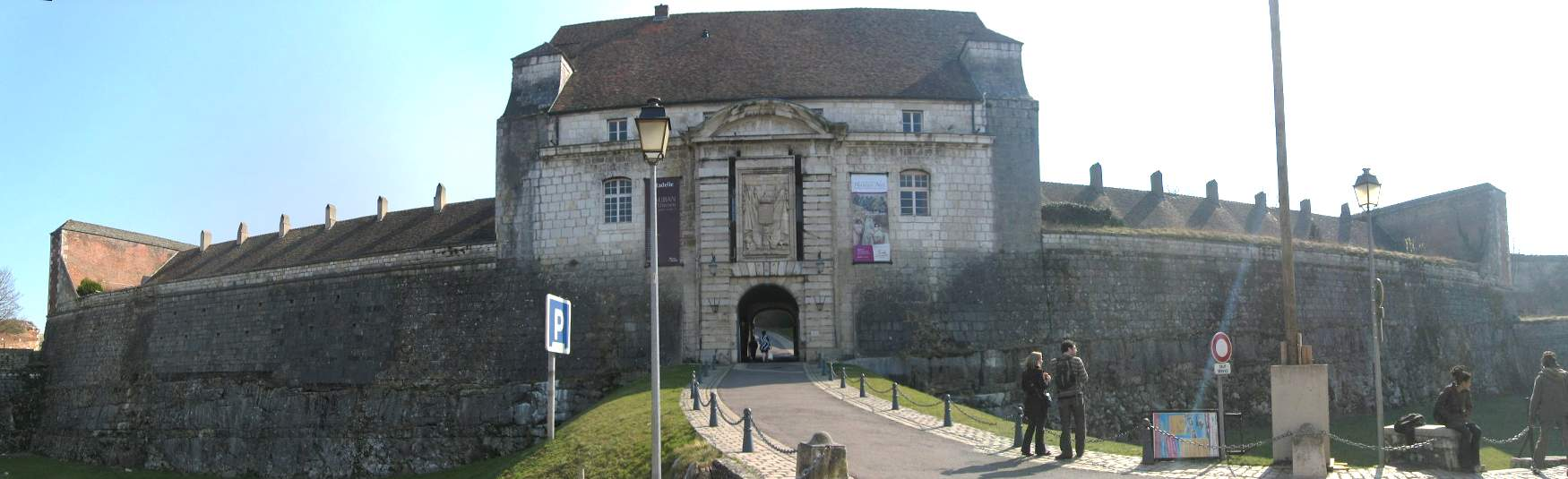
Entrance

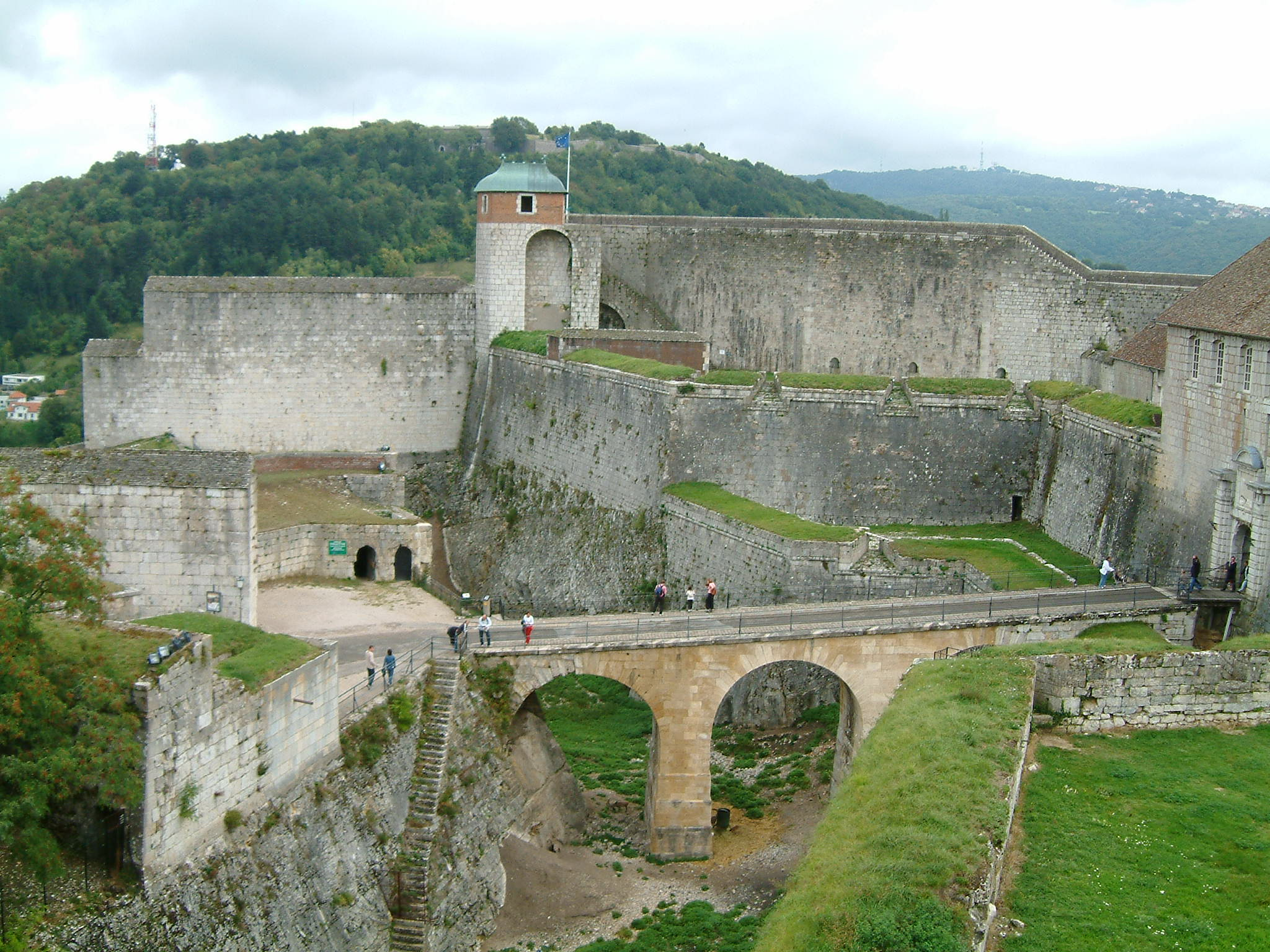
Fortified entry way to the Front Royal

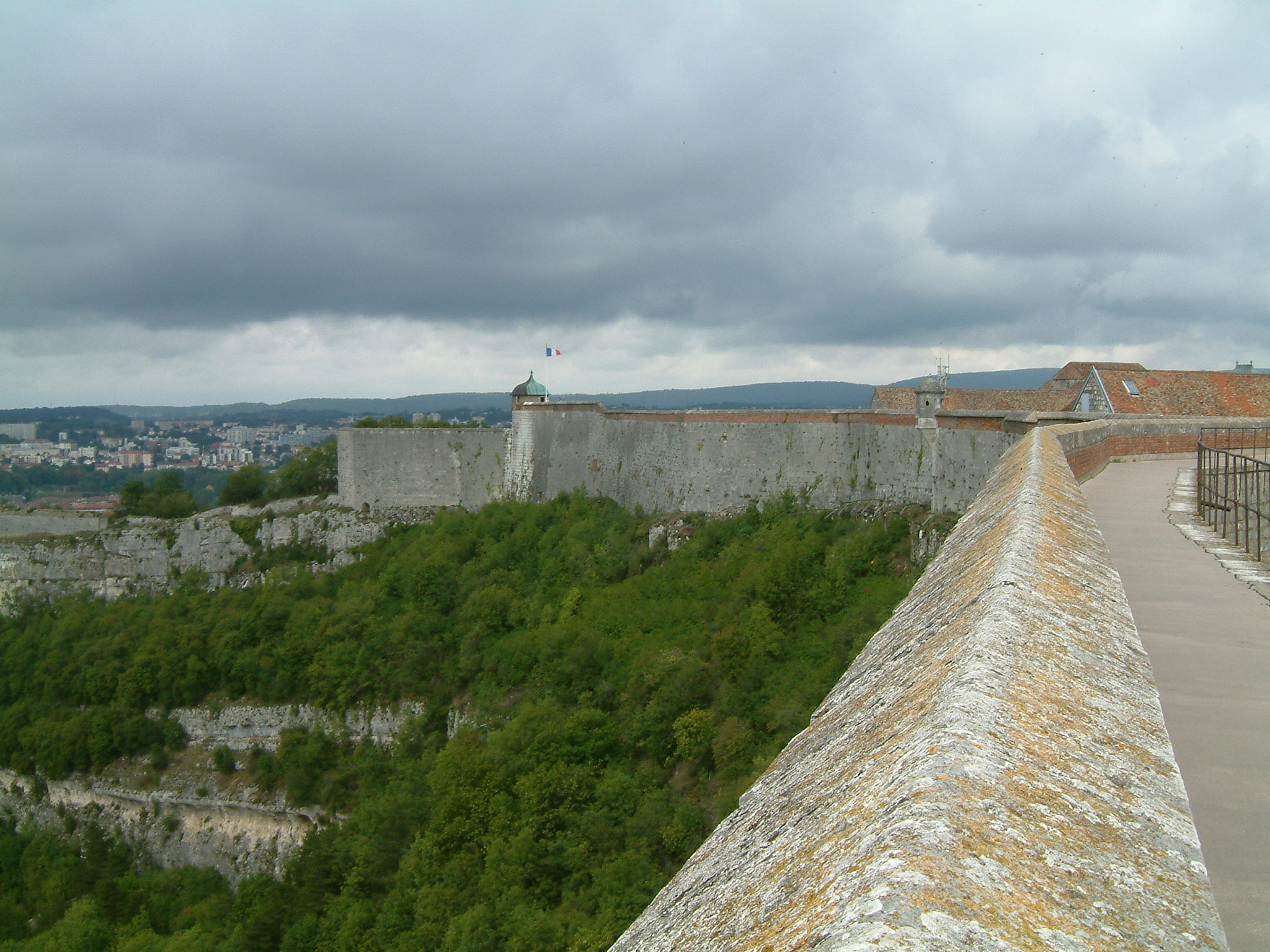
Ramparts

The Citadel is built on top of a large syncline on a rectangular field crossed across its width by three successive bastions (enclosures, or fronts) behind which extend three plazas. The whole is surrounded by walls covered by circular paths and punctuated by watchtowers and sentry posts. The walls are up to 15 to 20 metres (49 to 66 ft) high with a thickness between 5 and 6 metres (16 and 20 ft).

As mentioned above, Vauban built the first line of defense, Saint Stephen's Front, on the site of the eponymous cathedral that he destroyed in order to establish the defences.

In front of the curtain is ready a half-moon, surrounded by ditches, equipped to the canon – the flag of entry is extended to both sides of the curtain and completed by half bastions at the ends. The curtain, which was the section of wall between the 2 half bastions, was the weak point of the wall.

A rift in the rock, which could be dry or flooded. It was bounded by the escarpment (lower slope of a ditch) and Contrescarpe (masonry wall at the end of ditch). This divide was crossed by the bridge frame, which was completed by the drawbridge. Then the 2 half bastions laterally protected access to the door. They included: – one side exposed to the enemy army and cannons – which joined the side curtain to the bastions. He could be right (as in front royal) or orillons, i.e. sheltered behind a corner covering artillery stationed on the flank. The same system on the front orillons Saint-Etienne. Finally, two ties were arranged on each side of buildings to protect views and firing from the side hills and Chaudanne Bregille.

So this system was constructed so that for all positions, we could monitor the enemy wherever he is and he was so identified. Even if there were an enemy to the aplomb of a wall, rather than risking to look to achieve, you could touch from another post. In fact, all the shots and angles of view were studied to better defend the defensive system.

Then, to get to Royal Front, there was a large sloping grassy area, which forms the glacis. This allowed glacis, where the Front St. Etienne is crossed, to see the enemy coming and to anticipate any attack. Formerly, he was on naked and without trees. At the extreme left along the cliff, an underpass allowing front of the first defenders to retreat to the front royal. The Front Royal is flanked by two boxes of surveillance: the tower of the king and the tower of the queen. The front and the Front Royal Relief (at the other end of the Citadel) was built by the Spanish and edited by Vauban.

These fronts are linked by two huge walls, who married almost perfect topography and rock. The walls are made of limestone, and are 5 to 6 m thick and 15 to 20 m high. Vauban intended the walls to screen the Citadel's precincts from the view of any enemy occupying the surrounding hills.

The upper part of the parapet was built in brick because their chips were much less deadly than the limestone. These walls define the inner courtyard, and were surmounted by a walkway. Over ten sentry posts lined the walls, of which only one or two survive. These sentry posts were of limited use in combat as they were fragile.

== Other buildings ==
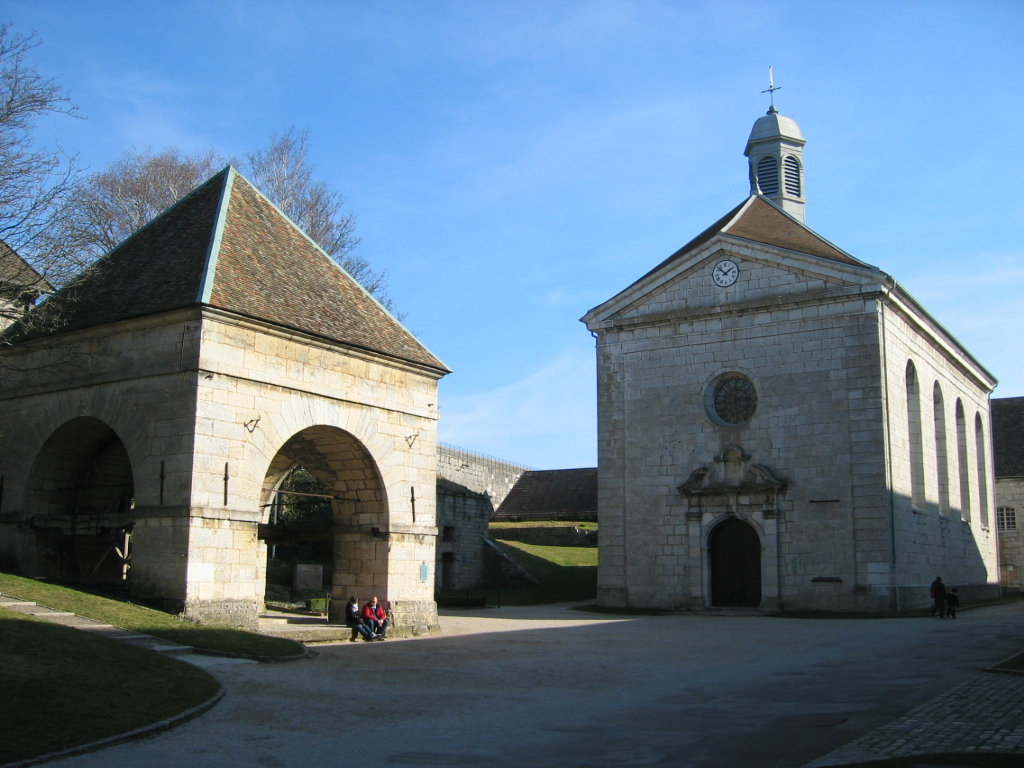
Chapel and well

The courtyard contains several buildings. At the centre is a school for cadets, built in 1682, on the orders of Louvois, minister of the Sun King. A court divides the building into two parts. One part was a barracks that housed up to 600 cadets. The other part is the school. In terms of its architecture, the fire is divided over its entire length by a thick wall that put the occupants to escape the shooting side.

Built fortified against the wall, away from enemy fire, the powder magazine: building for the conservation of barrels of powder, especially protected and strengthened to prevent the potential of ignition in fire and explosion hazards . It was built under a canopy in the open arch and "the test" (able to withstand bomb). Nails and hinges were bronze to avoid the risk of spark. It came in wooden clogs.

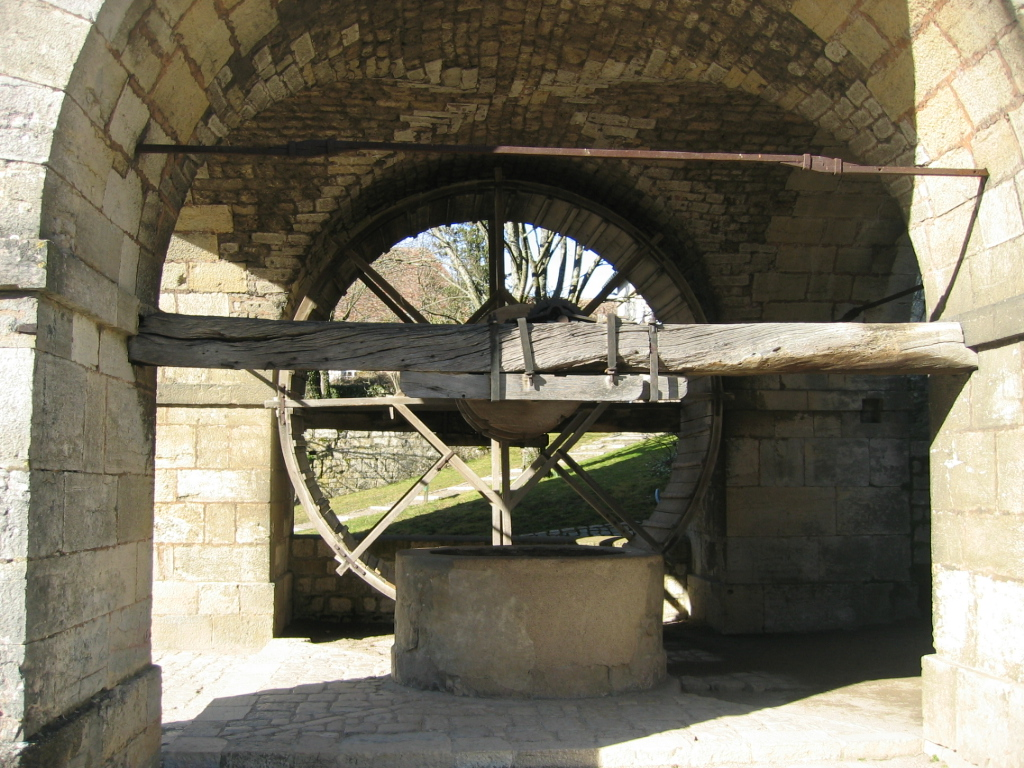
The Citadel's 132-metre (433 ft) deep well

The arsenal was responsible for the storage, maintenance and repair of weapons. The ground floor was reserved for the gun and other gear; the first floor housed the guns, knives, ammunition.

In the seventeenth century, a system of pipes brought water to the citadel. However, this made the citadel vulnerable to siege as an enemy could easily destroy the pipe system. Therefore, in 1692, Vauban had a well cut to a depth of 132 metres (433 ft) through the rock to the water table. A wheel with a diameter of four metres, operated by a man who walked within it, served to lift buckets. Unfortunately, the water turned out to be brackish and undrinkable. Instead, the citadel relied on cisterns that stored rainwater. There was one at the front. The water was still of average quality.

The Citadel's chapel is dedicated to Saint Stephen. It was consecrated in 1683, and commemorated the cathedral and cloisters that Vauban demolished when constructing the Royual Front. Vauban included a chapel in each of his fortresses for the garrison to attend Sunday mass. The chapel has an attractive portal adorned with Doric columns but is otherwise simple. Otto I, Count of Burgundy was buried there.

The buildings that Vauban undertook not randomly constructed and responded to specific needs.

=== The Citadel in recent times ===
In the following centuries, successive French governments used the Citadel as a prison or a garrison. The prisoners included the accomplices of "La Voisin", accused of poisonings during the reign of Louis XIV, deserters from the armies of Louis XIV and those of Louis XV, and Royalists during the French Revolution. During the First Empire the Citadel housed Austrian, French and, Spanish prisoners of war. Still, in the nineteenth century, the Citadel performed its military function when it withstood attacks by the Austrians in 1814, and the Prussians in 1871, attacks that caused little damage.

During the First World War, Besançon was sufficiently far from the front that the fighting left the Citadel untouched. Instead, its primary role was a logistical one.

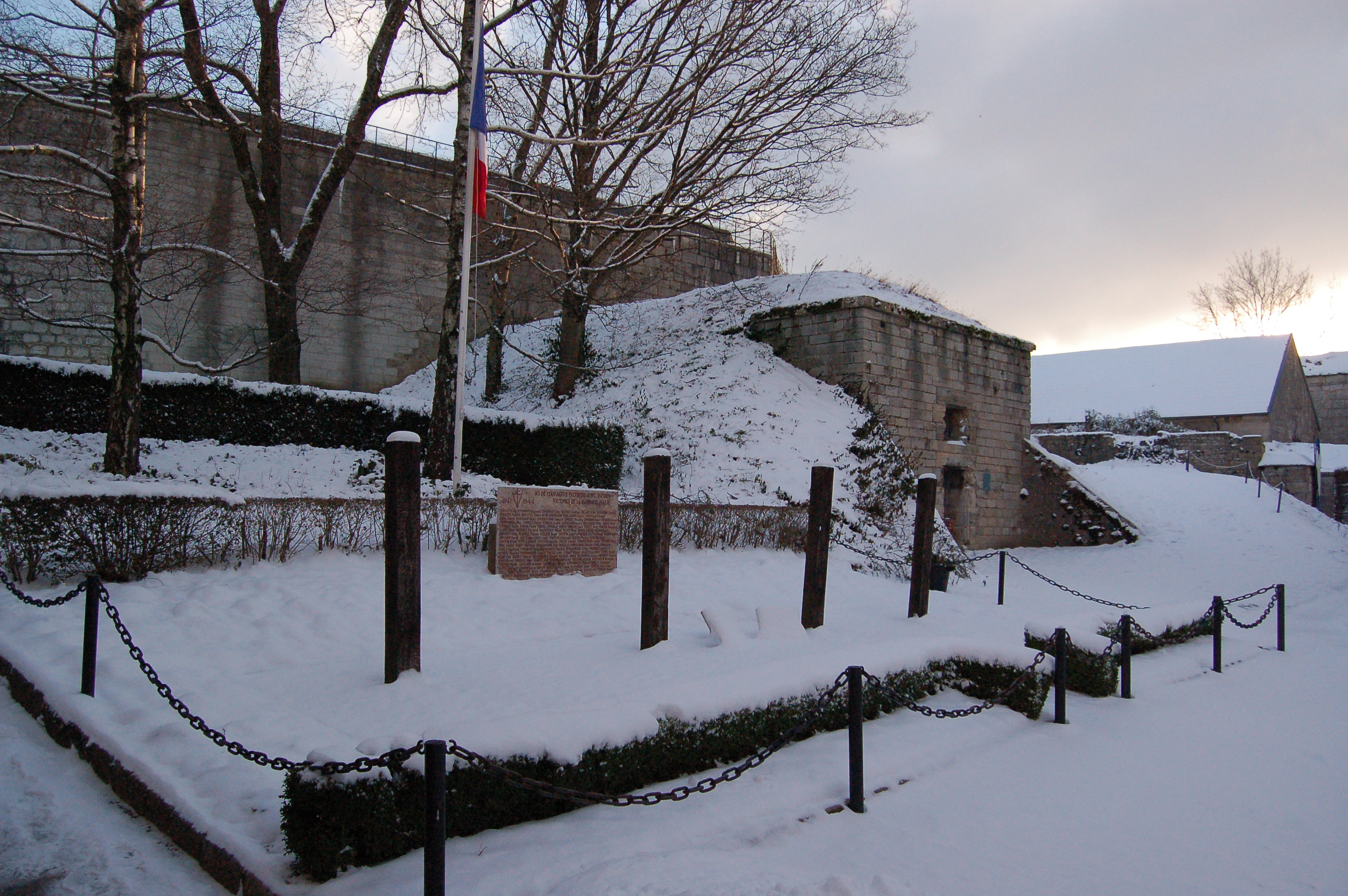
Memorial to the Resistance fighters executed at the Citadel

During World War II the Germans captured the Citadel in 1940. Later, between 28 April 1941, and 18 August 1944, during the Occupation, German firing squads executed some one hundred resistance fighters. The fighters included eighty Frenchmen, five Spaniards, two Italians, a Luxembourgian, one Swiss and one Pole. The most painful episode occurred on Sunday 26 September 1943. The sixteen Resistance fighters who died on that day included Henri Fertet, a sixteen-year-old who, like Guy Môquet, wrote a poignant last letter confirming his commitment to the cause. A memorial, in the form of four stakes standing between the well and the chapel of Saint Stephen, commemorates "les fusillés" – the men who were shot.

After heavy fighting, the Americans captured the Citadel in 1944, and used it to hold German prisoners of war. After the Second World War, the Citadel initially served as a military depot.

=== Current use ===
In 1958, the city of Besançon acquired the site from the French government and decided to use the Citadel as a tourist site and the locus for various culture activities. Thus, it now contains several museums, both historical and scientific. The number of visitors is now approaching 300,000 per year, making the Citadel the most visited monument in the region of Franche-Comté. The following table shows the attendance figures for recent years.

Number of visitors to the citadel
2001	2002	2003	2004	2005	2006	2007
241,532	277,777	276,169	275,751	257,342	222,515	274,539

==== Museum of the Resistance and Deportation ====
This museum, which was established in 1971 at the initiative of Denise Lorach, a former deportee, exhibits art, photographs, and documents pertaining to the resistance during World War II and the deportation of citizens. It receives an average 65,000 visitors per annum. The museum has twenty rooms, and the location was chosen in part because a hundred resistance members were shot there during the Occupation. A memorial is dedicated to them.

Two galleries are dedicated concentration in the work of John Daligault, Nacht und Nebel deported / Night and Fog, and that of Léon Delarbre, deported resistant to Auschwitz. The collection presented for all collections of this museum in France, in large part, is a deposit The National Museum of Modern Art.

The Education Department, led by a teacher seconded from Education, is available for teachers to prepare for a visit or student work. it also provides writing materials, in connection with the programs of the classes of cycle 3 to the end, it also offers assistance in the preparation of the National Competition of the resistance and deportation

==== Museum of Natural History ====
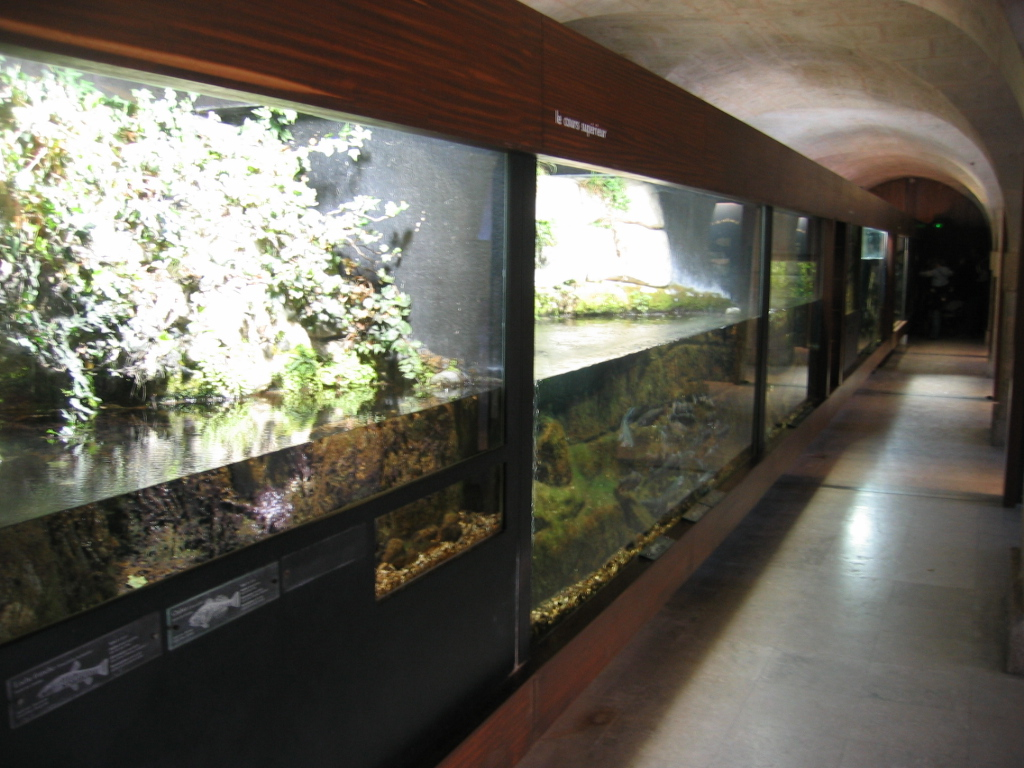
Aquariums

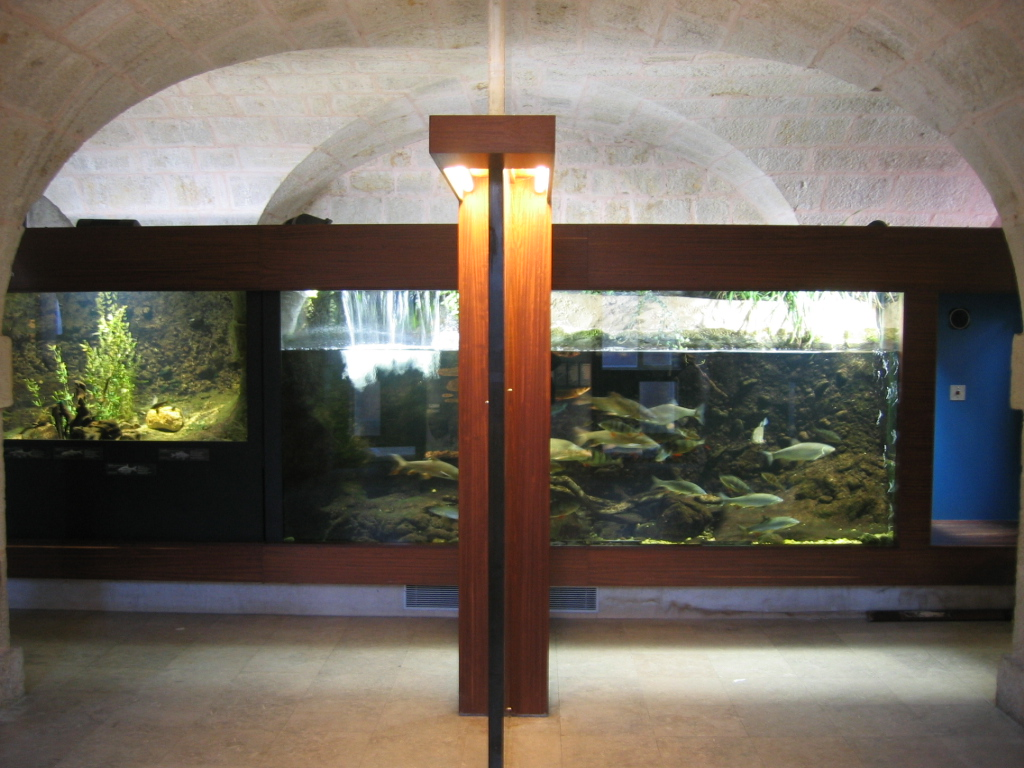
Rainbow trout

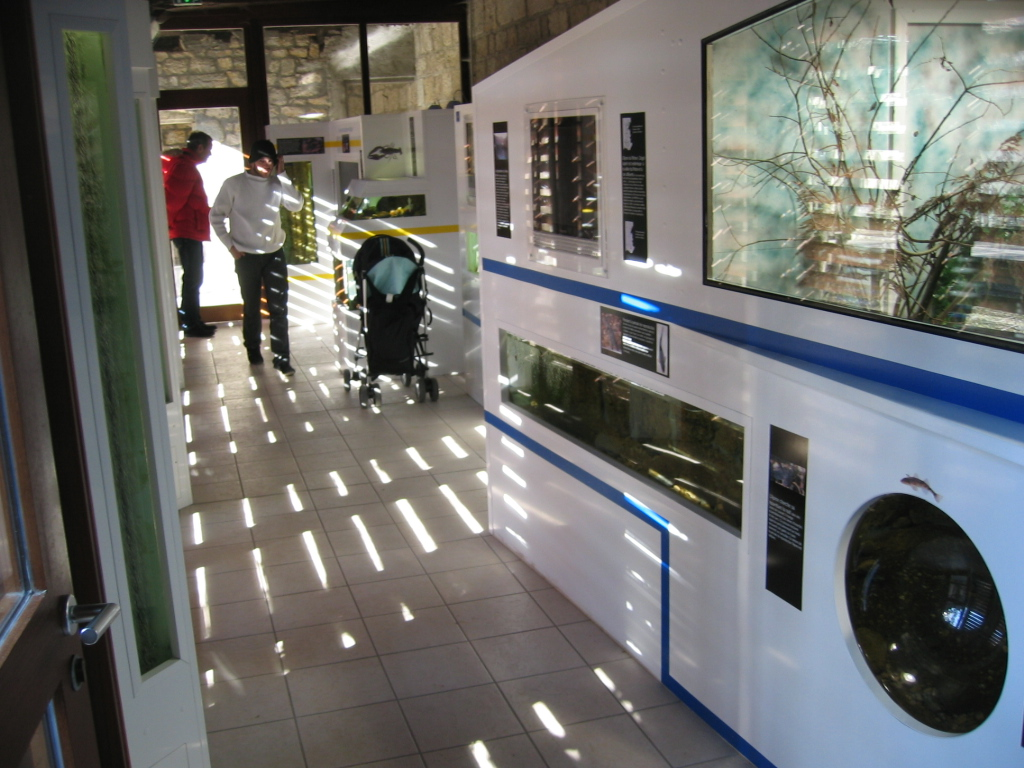
Presentation of aprons and crayfish

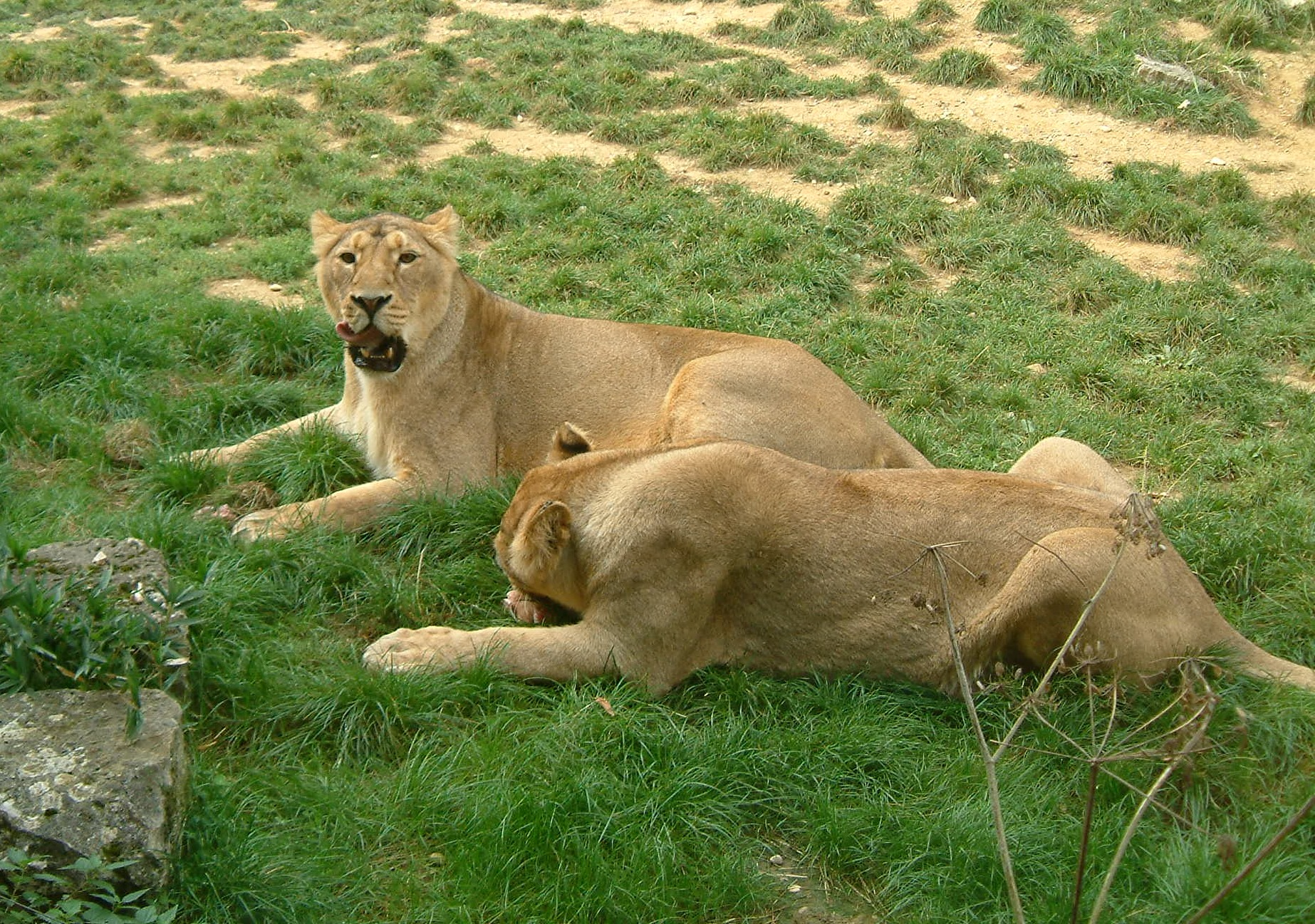
Lions

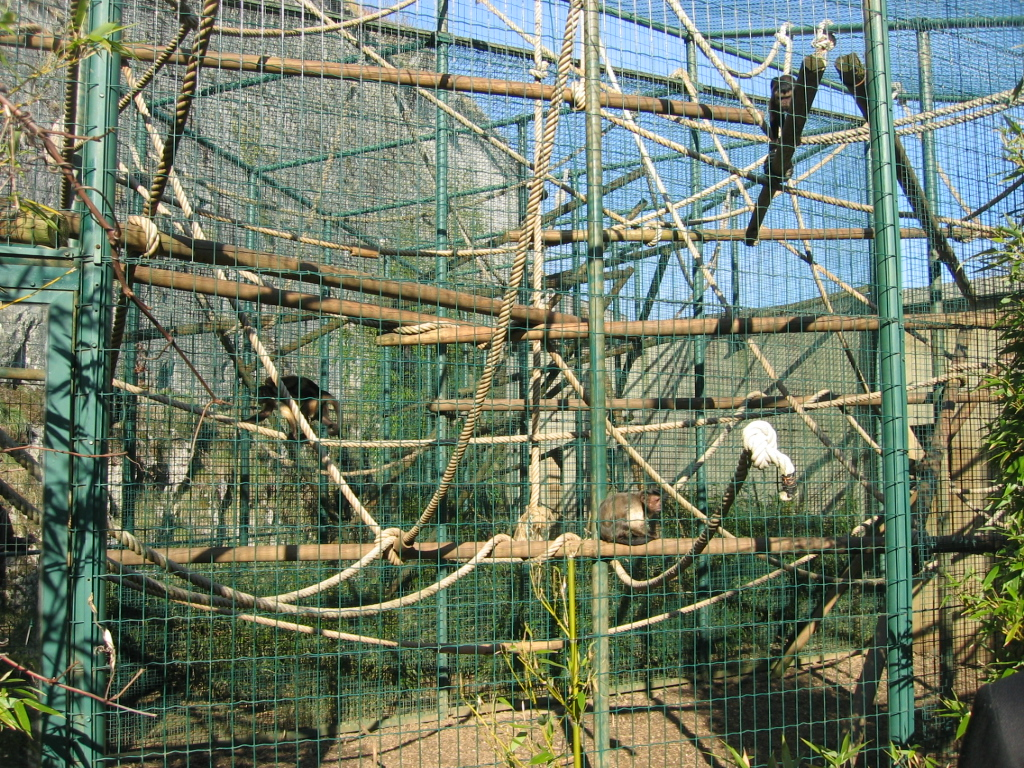
Aviary

- The Course of Evolution is a pedagogic display based on collections originally established by the University of Franche-Comté.
- The zoo is a member of the European Association of Zoos and Aquaria (EAZA), and holds two endangered species of big cats, the Asian lion and the Siberian tiger, twenty species of primates, and some thirty species of exotic birds. The zoo's primary objective is the conservation and reproduction of endangered species. It also conducts research on animal behaviour.
- The Insectarium, the largest in France, highlights insects, which represent 85% of world fauna.
- The Aquarium features local fish, from tiny minnows to large carp and catfish; there is also a farm breeding endangered "red foot" crayfish and aprons of the Rhone region as part of a conservation project while increasing awareness to improve their living environments.
- The Noctarium reverses day and night, and so makes it possible for visitors to watch the activities of the nocturnal mammals it contains.
- The Children's Farm provides a discovery space for children.
- The Climatorium features displays on the evolution of climate on a global and regional scale and its impact on life forms.

=== Heritage identity ===
- The museum comtois, which has been installed since 1960 in the Front Royal, focuses on the interaction between the land and human adaptation. It highlights the art and popular traditions of Franche-Comté. Through its sixteen showrooms it describes daily life in the 19th and 20th centuries by focusing on four main themes: food, entertainment, thought and work. The museum also has a large photographic collection of regional ethnography. Lastly, there is a model of the entire citadel.
- Space Vauban covers the era of Vauban (1638–1697), who was famous for designing impregnable fortifications. The four exhibits describe Vauban, the wars for control of the Franche-Comté, and the musketeers at the Citadel. The exhibit on Vauban in Besançon is part of the background to the classification of the city as a UNESCO World Heritage site.

A project aimed at changing the presentation in the interpretive centre is now under study.

- Service Régional d'Archéologie, under the Regional Directorate of Cultural Affairs, is only accessible by appointment. This division manages the inventory of regional sites, mapping, and management of preservation efforts and planned excavations.

== See also ==
- Fortifications of Vauban
- List of castles in France
