= Nicolai Michoutouchkine =

Russian painter (1929 - 2010)

Nicolai Michoutouchkine (5 October 1929 – 2 May 2010), a Russian from Vanuatu, was a painter, artist, designer, and collector of Pacific artifacts.

He was co-founder with Aloi Pilioko of the Michoutouchkine-Pilioko Foundation and of the Museum of Oceanic Art based in Port Vila, Vanuatu.

== Early life ==
Nicolai Michoutouchkine was born on 5 October 1929 in Belfort, France to White Russians parents who immigrated from Russia in 1920, via Gallipoli, Turkey and Bulgaria to France. During 1937-1947, he attended primary and secondary school in Belfort, France, and was initiated into painting by Léon Delarbre.

In 1947 he went to Paris, where he studied painting in the "Grande Chaumière" art school in Montparnasse and also at the Scientific Commercial School where he obtained the commercial diploma. In 1949, he made his first hitchhiking trip to Rome, Italy.

On 7 August 1953, Nicolai Michoutouchkine left Paris. During the next 4 years, he traveled through the Middle East, South Asia, and Southeast Asia to Australia, organizing exhibitions of his travel drawings along the way. These were his first experiences in organizing art exhibitions.

In August 1957, he received the message from the French authorities informing him that his military service was overdue and he needed to immediately report to the nearest French authorities. He departed from Sydney and went to New Caledonia, where he arrived on 6 September 1957 in Nouméa. During 1957-1969, Nicolai Michoutouchkine served his military service in Nouméa, as secretary of the Governor of New Caledonia, Mr. Grimald.

== Work ==
The following are further events in his professional life:

- 1957 - Nicolai Michoutouchkine started collecting native objects from Melanesia and Polynesia. Since that time, several thousand native objects were collected by the artist, including: traditional tools, household utensils, fishing accessories, traditional weapons, sculptures, engravings, paintings, musical instruments, clothes and ornaments, architectural components, cult objects and a selection of other precious artifacts. He held the first exhibition, at the Societe Havraise Caledonienne de Nouméa, of his paintings inspired in India, Nepal, Burma and Ceylon.
- 1958 – Nicolai met Alois Pelioko in Wallis and Futuna. The same year he had his first meeting with Soviet scientists. The scientific research vessel "Vityaz" arrived at Numea, New Caledonia.
- 1959 - There is an exhibition, in the same place, of his watercolours and gouaches of Asia. After his military service, he made, at the request of the Tourism office, trips into the interior of New Caledonia to collect traditional works of art. He visited many villages and met many local craftsmen. In August he opened the first art gallery and organized for the first time in Nouméa, an exhibition of creations by young New Caledonian painters, F. Fay, and Indonesian and Melanesian artists. This type of exhibition would be followed by many others. He organized two exhibitions of art and ethnography where he exhibited his own collection as well as that of the museum of Kanak art of New Caledonia. They were opened by Jacques Soustelle, Minister of French Overseas Territories. In December he departed for Futuna. During his two-year stay, he also visits the Wallis Islands and collected objects. Aloi Pilioko joined him.
- 1961- In August at the invitation of the French Resident Commissioner of the New Hebrides, Nicolai and Aloi arrived in Port Vila and set up an exhibition there. Nicolai painted the Melsisi church, Pentecost. Expeditions to the islands of Malekula, Ambrym, Santo, Feme; Tanna. Finally settled down in Port Vila at Esnaar.
- 1962 - Trip to New Caledonia, exhibition in Nouméa, visit to centre island. In July departure for French Polynesia; visit to the Windward in Leeward Islands, Tuamotu and the Austral Islands. Continuance collection of art objects.
- 1963 - Return to Port Vila. Exhibition of Polynesian, New Caledonian objects and of the 3 artists' paintings in Port Vila and the island of Espiritu Santo. Expeditions to the Solomon Islands and Santa Cruz Islands, Paintings for Tenagai church and for the Anglican cathedral of Solomon Islands.
- 1964 - Expeditions to New Guinea (Sepik, Mount Hagen). Exhibitions in Sydney, Canberra, and Adelaide, Australia. Exhibitions in Port Vila, Nouméa, and Bourail, Visits to Tonga and Fiji, including Rotuma.
- 1965 - Visits to Wallis Islands. First exhibition in Mata-Utu. Exhibitions in Tahiti, Marquesas Islands, Austral Islands. Trip to Western Samoa. Further trips to New Guinea.
- 1966 - Return from New Guinea. Exhibition in Nouméa. Exhibitions in Port Vila, Espiritu Santo. Exhibition at UTA airlines office in Paris.
- In 1967 - Nicolai and Aloi decide to take part of their collection around the world, seeking to demonstrate the dignity and creativity of Pacific Islander's art.
- 1969 - Return to the South Pacific, punctuated with stops in Sri Lanka, Malaysia, Thailand, Vietnam, Indonesia.
- 1970 - Decoration of public buildings in Fiji and of credit union school. Exhibitions in Switzerland (June–September) at Museum of Ethnography in Neuchâtel.
- 1972 - Return to New Hebrides to Esnaar. The French Minister of Education awarded Aloi a gold medal. Awarding of another gold medal to Aloi by the Salon de Mai of Nouméa, for his needlework. Exhibition at the first Festival of Arts in Fiji.
- 1974 - Exhibition in Auckland and brief stay in New Zealand.
- 1975 - Exhibition in Tokyo, Japan. Donation of 290 artifacts to the Pacific exhibition of the Little World Museum of Man in Nagoya, Japan. Nicolai was made a Chevalier du Merite des Arts et des Lettres of France.
- In 1978, after several attempts to create an official museum of Pacific art in the region, the two artists decided to establish their own non-profit foundation – "The Michoutouchkine Pilioko Foundation" in Vanuatu with the aim to protect and safeguard the cultural heritage of the Pacific SIDS (Small Islands Developing States). The Foundation has supported and encouraged young artists originating from Pacific islands by organizing regular workshops. Exhibitions in Sweden and France.
- In 1979 the Michoutouchkine-Pilioko collection is invited to the USSR. From 1979 to 1987 a travel exhibition is organized under the patronage of the Academy of Sciences and the Ministry o Culture of USSR and visits the following cities: Moscow, Khabarovsk, Novosibirsk, Tbilisi, Yerevan, Leningrad, Sardarabat in Armenia, Frunze in Kyrgyzstan, Samarkand and Tashkent in Uzbekistan, and others.
- In 1980 The New Hebrides became independent and the country took the name of Vanuatu.
- 1980-1984 - During the following years Nicolai works in his residence in Esnaar in Vanuatu on several paintings, continues to expend his collection and organized several exhibitions of his and Aloi Piliokos works and his collection of Oceanic artifacts. Several exhibitions in Japan, Australia, Taiwan, Indonesia, Thailand, Malaysia, Singapore, Fiji.
- 1983- Exhibition in the Sydney Opera House, promotion by Air Vanuatu in Australia. Decoration of the Michoutouchkine restaurant at the Le Lagon hotel.
- 1984 - Promotion of Vanuatu by means of exhibitions, fashion parades in New Caledonia and in Australia. Organization of a seminar bringing together South Pacific artists at Esnaar in co-operation with the Institute of Pacific Studies.
- In 1985 the first regional art workshop convened by the Foundation and the University of the South Pacific was staged at Esnaar, bringing together contemporary artists from Papua New Guinea, the Solomons, New Caledonia, Samoa, Tonga, Fiji and Wallis as well as from Vanuatu. This workshop was held for four successive years at Esnaar to the benefit of many of Vanuatu's young contemporary artists, and began to be held again in 1992 in other Pacific countries, still partly funded and coordinated by the Michoutouchkine-Pilioko Foundation. Creating of fashion clothing, all by hand, in original designs (Michoutouchkine label)
- 1986 -Exhibition at the French embassy in Port Vila, called 'The Pacifies', of various works by the two artists. Tapestries, wall paintings, fashion parade.
- 1987 - Exhibition in Japan.
- 1988 - Exhibition at James Cook University in Townsville, Australia.
- 1989 - Publication of catalogue, in French and English, by the Institute of Ethnography of the Academy of Sciences of the USSR of the USSR of the Michoutouchkine-Pilioko collection exhibited in USSR. Exhibition of the collection in Fukuoka, Japan at the South Pacific Village, part of the International Exhibition.
- 1990 - Exhibition in Osaka, Japan, South Pacific Village at International Floral Exhibition.
- 1991 - Exhibition at the National Museum of Taipei, Taiwan. Exhibition at the Modern Museum of Taichung, Taiwan.Exhibition at the Duta Fine Arts Gallery, Jakarta, Indonesia. Exhibitions of pictures, wall paintings, tapestries and fashion parades in Nouméa.
- 1993 - Exhibition at Duta Fine Arts Foundation, Indonesia. Exhibition at Barli Museum, Bandung, Jakarta, Indonesia. Exhibition at Nyoman Gunarsa Museum, Yogyakarta, Indonesia. Exhibition at French Cultural Centre, Surabaya. Exhibition at University of New South Wales, Australia. Inauguration of exhibition by Prime Minister Maxime Carlot Korman, Port Vila.
- 1994 Exhibition at Kunstkamera, Museum of Peter the Great, St Petersburg. 6th Pacific Artists Workshop at the Institute of Pacific Studies, University of South Pacific, Suva, Fiji
- 1998 creation of the Cultural Centre Tjibaou (CCT) under the patronage of François Mitterrand
- In 2006 Michoutouchkine-Pilioko foundation lent for 10 years 400 objects from the collection to the Museum Pasifica in the Nusa Dua in Bali, Indonesia.
- In 2007 the Cultural Centre Tjibaou in New Caledonia celebrated 50th years of Michoutouchkine's activities in Oceania. A well illustrated catalog was published.
- In 2009 Nicolai participates in the Third Conference of Russian Nationals in Asia-pacific region, held in Canberra, Australia.
- 2009 - Inauguration of the bust of lieutenant V. Golovnin to mark the 200 years of the first contacts between Russian and New Hebrides. Visit to Moscow for the Congress of Russian nationals in Moscow, Russia.
- On 2 May 2010, Nicolai Michoutouchkine died in Nouméa, New Caledonia, at the age of 80.
