= Henri Fertet =

French Resistance fighter (1926–1943)

- Born: Henri Claude Fertet; 27 October 1926; Seloncourt, Doubs, France
- Died: 26 September 1943 (aged 16); Citadel of Besançon, France
- Cause of death: Execution by firing squad
- Burial place: Saint-Ferjeux Cemetery
- Other name: Émile (nom de guerre)
- Occupation: Resistance fighter
- Known for: Farewell letter to his parents
- Awards: Chevalier de la Légion d'honneur; Compagnon de la Libération; Croix de Guerre 1939–1945; Croix du combattant volontaire de la Résistance

Henri Claude Fertet (French pronunciation: [ɑ̃ʁi fɛʁtɛ]; 27 October 1926 – 26 September 1943) was a French schoolboy and Resistance fighter who was executed by the German occupying forces at the Citadel of Besançon at age 16 during World War II. He was posthumously awarded several national honours. He is known for the letter he wrote to his parents on the morning of his execution, (Note: Many of the citations in this article quote extracts from that letter.) and he has become one of those who symbolise the French Resistance.

== Early life and background ==
Fertet was born on 27 October 1926 in Seloncourt, Doubs, France, to primary schoolteachers (French: instituteur). His father too was named Henri; the sources do not record his mother's name. He had a brother, Pierre, who was three years younger. His first schooling was at Seloncourt, where his parents worked. In 1937, the family moved to Velotte in Besançon, where the younger Henri attended the Lycée Victor-Hugo de Besançon. He was passionate about archaeology and history.

== Career ==
During the school summer holidays of 1942 while World War II was ongoing, he joined a Resistance group in Larnod (near Besançon) led by Marcel Simon, a 22-year-old farmer. In February 1943, that group (which had about thirty members, Fertet being the youngest) integrated itself into the Francs-Tireurs et Partisans (FTP) under the name of Groupe Guy Mocquet.

Groupe Guy Mocquet mounted thirty-one known operations between November 1942 and July 1943. Fertet took part in three of them: on 16 April 1943, a night attack on an explosives depot at Fort de Montfaucon; on 7 May, the destruction of a high-tension electricity pylon near Châteaufarine; and on 12 June, an attack by him and Marcel Reddet on a German customs officer to steal his weapon, uniform, and papers. Fertet shot and fatally wounded the officer, but the unexpected arrival of a motorcyclist meant that Fertet and Reddet failed to seize the documents.

=== Capture ===
Groupe Guy Mocquet was then actively hunted down. Several members were arrested in June. In the early hours of the night of 2–3 July, Fertet was arrested at his family home at the Lycée, taken before the Feldkommandantur (a German military court), committed to Maison d'arrêt de Besançon in Doubs, held in solitary confinement, and tortured.

On 15 September, twenty-three prisoners from three Resistance groups were brought before Feldkommandantur 560 to answer for crimes of which they were accused. The trial lasted four days. Despite the able advocacy of their lawyers, Paul Koch and Fernand Mouquin, seventeen of them were sentenced to death on 18 September. Simon and Reddet were among them; Fertet was the youngest. Under German law, no-one under the age of 18 could be sentenced to death barring exceptional circumstances. The court ruled that the cases of Fertet (age 16) and Reddet (age 17) were exceptional. The lawyers filed legal appeals; Henry Soum, the préfet of Doubs, Maurice-Louis Dubourg, the Archbishop of Besançon, and the Swiss consul pleaded for general mercy. The sentence of one of the condemned, André Montavon, a 24-year-old Swiss national, was commuted to a term of imprisonment.

=== Execution and burial ===
At around dawn on Sunday, 26 September, the sixteen condemned men were told that their appeals had been rejected. They were provided with writing materials and given the opportunity to compose a last letter. They were taken to the Citadel of Besançon and, between 7:36 and 8:25 AM, shot in batches of four. The German officer who commanded the execution party reported that they had all refused blindfolds and died bravely, shouting "Vive la France!"

Eight of the sixteen, including Fertet, were buried in Saint-Ferjeux Cemetery, Besançon. In defiance of German orders, local people covered their graves, identified only by numbers, with flowers. After the war, Fertet's body was exhumed and cremated; his ashes and those of his father, who had died in the meantime, were scattered at Sermoyer, Ain.

== Fertet's farewell letter ==
The original of Fertet's farewell letter has not survived. However, it was soon copied and circulated clandestinely. On 9 December 1943, French journalist (and postwar politician) Maurice Schumann broadcast it on BBC radio from London. (Note: One source says, that during a BBC broadcast the reader of the letter was moved to tears. However, the circumstances are very unclear: the source says that the broadcast was on 30 December and that a diary entry was made about it on 1 December [sic].) On 5 June 2019, French president Emmanuel Macron read extracts from it aloud, in French, at a 75th-anniversary commemoration of the Normandy landings, in Portsmouth, England, one of the embarcation ports.

In this English translation, the passages which Macron read out are in plain type, and the remainder are in italics.

My dear parents,

My letter will cause you great pain, but I have seen you so full of courage that I do not doubt that you will want to preserve it, if only for love of me.

You cannot know how I have suffered morally in my cell, how I have suffered from seeing you no more, from feeling only from afar your tender solicitude, during these eighty-seven days of imprisonment, I needed your love more than your parcels, and often asked you to forgive me for the wrongs I did to you, all the wrongs I did to you. You cannot doubt that I love you today, because before I loved you perhaps by routine, but now I understand everything you did for me. I think I have arrived at genuine filial love, true filial love. Perhaps, after the war, a comrade will speak for me, of that love which I communicated to him; I hope he will not fail in this henceforth sacred mission.

Thank everyone who knew me, especially my relatives and friends, tell them all of my confidence in eternal France. Embrace most strongly my grandparents, my uncles, my aunts and cousins, Henriette. Tell M. le Curé that I have been thinking in particular of him and his. I thank him for the great honour he has done me, an honour of which, I believe, I have shown myself worthy. I salute also as I fall my school comrades. In this regard, Hennemay owes me a packet of cigarettes, Jacquin, my book on prehistoric man. Return the Count of Monte-Christo to Emeurgeon, 3, chemin Français, behind the station. Give Maurice Andrey de La Maltournée, 40 grams of tobacco which I borrowed from him.

I leave my little library to Pierre, my schoolbooks to my dear Papa, my collections to my dear little Maman, but let her be wary of the prehistoric axe and the Gaulish scabbard.

I die for my country, I want a free France and a happy people, not a proud France first nation of the world, but a hardworking, industrious and honest France.

That the French be happy, there's the whole point. In life, one must know how to find and keep happiness.

As for me, do not worry, I will keep my courage and my good humour to the end and I will sing Sambre et Meuse, because it was you, my dear sweet Maman, who taught it to me.

With Pierre, be severe and tender. Check his work and force him to work. Do not accept negligence. He must be worthy of me. Of the "three little blacks", only one remains. He must succeed.

The soldiers are coming for me. I cannot delay. My handwriting may be shaky, but that is because I only have a stub of a pencil. I have no fear of death, my conscience is completely clear.

Papa, I beg you, I pray, reflect that if I die, it's for my good. What death could be more honorable for me? I die voluntarily for my country. We will meet again soon all four, soon to heaven. What is a hundred years? Maman remember: "And these avengers will have new defenders Who, after their death, will have successors." (Note: "Et ces vengeurs trouveront de nouveaux défenseurs / Qui, après leur mort, auront des successeurs" is a quotation (but Fertet wrote "auront" ("will have") for "trouveront" ("will find")) from Act IV, Scene 3 of the 1669 play Britannicus by Jean Racine.)

Farewell, death calls me, I will refuse a blindfold, I will not be bound. I embrace you all. It is hard when one must die.

A thousand kisses. Long live France.

One condemned to death at the age of 16.

H. Fertet.

Forgive my spelling mistakes, not time to reread.

Sender: Monsieur Henri Fertet, to Heaven, close to God.

== Posthumous recognition ==
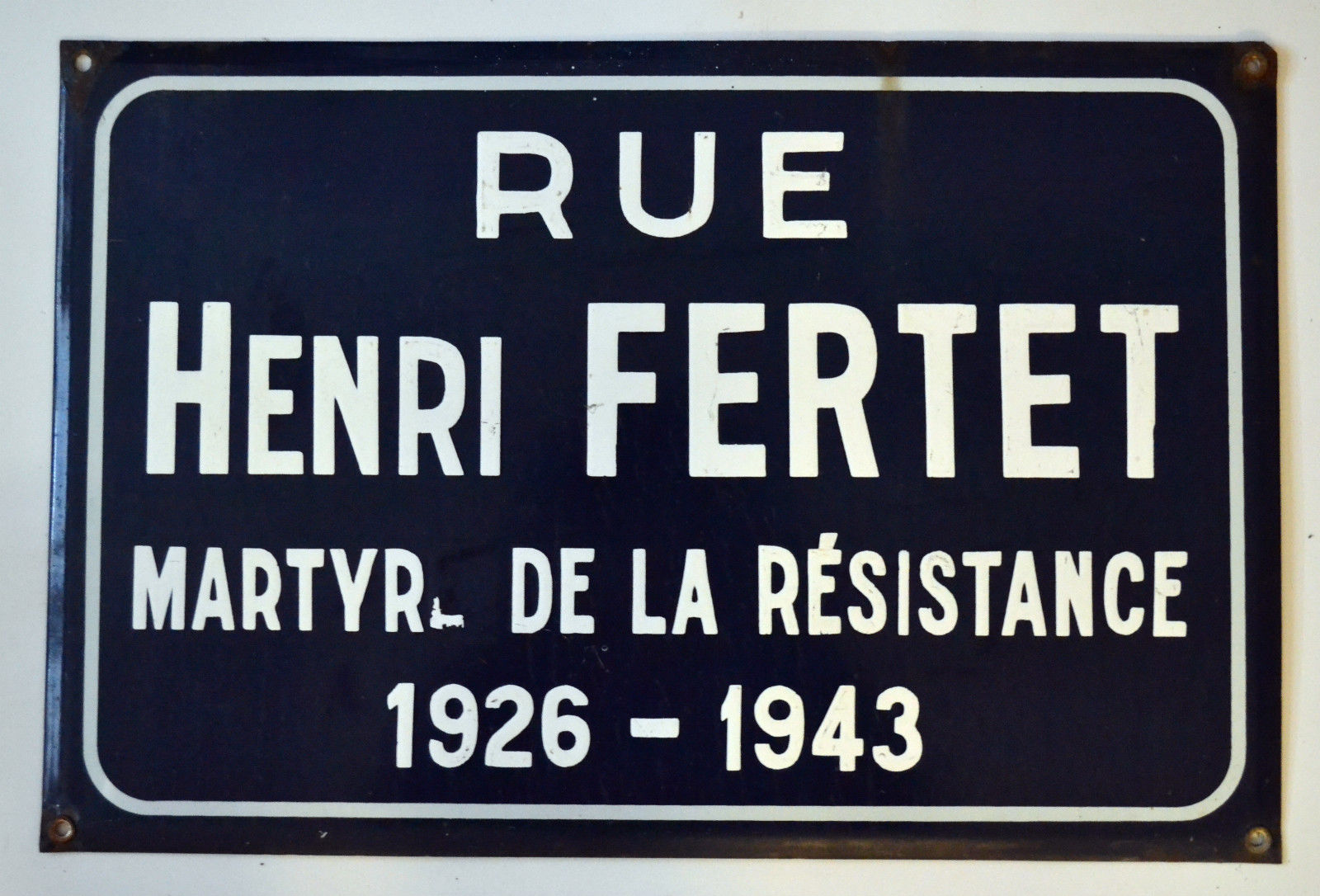
Rue Henri Fortet, Besançon

After the Liberation of France, Fertet was honoured with the distinctions of Chevalier de la Légion d'honneur, Compagnon de la Libération (presented in 1947 to Fertet's father by de Gaulle in person), Croix de Guerre 1939–1945, Croix du combattant volontaire de la Résistance, Médaille de la déportation et de l'internement pour faits de Résistance, Médaille de la Résistance française, and the rank of aspirant ('officer candidate') in the French Forces of the Interior.

The following are named in his memory: Rue Henri Fertet, Besançon, a street; Collège Henri Fertet, Sancey, a middle school; Lycée des Métiers Henri Fertet, Gray, a technical college; and a tram route in Besançon.

Fertet's parents were anticlerical; that is, they opposed the influence of priests and of the Church in secular affairs. Fertet, however, was a devout Catholic, as were many of Groupe Guy Mocquet. It is paradoxical that he has become a sort of Republican saint. (Note: Examples of his commemoration at secular events include the ceremonies at Jardin du Luxembourg, Paris in 2017 and 2019.)

== Epilogue ==
On 26 or 27 November 1980, in the Forest of Chailluz near Besançon, Fertet's brother Pierre, a 51-year-old instituteur, and his octogenarian mother gassed themselves to death with the exhaust fumes of their car. Pierre had been much affected by his brother's death, and had venerated him, to the point of obsession. Pierre had refused to allow publication of Henri's letter without his express permission while he lived.

In 2013, Pierre's daughter, Myriam Fertet-Boudriot, Henri's last living relative, donated a collection of memorabilia to the Musée de la Résistance et de la Déportation in the Citadel of Besançon. It included some of Henri's drawings, a handkerchief stained with his blood (possibly as a result of his maltreatment in prison), and a 4 cm (1.6 in) tall figurine of the Virgin Mary which he had fashioned out of breadcrumbs, and before which he had prayed, during his imprisonment.

== Memorials ==
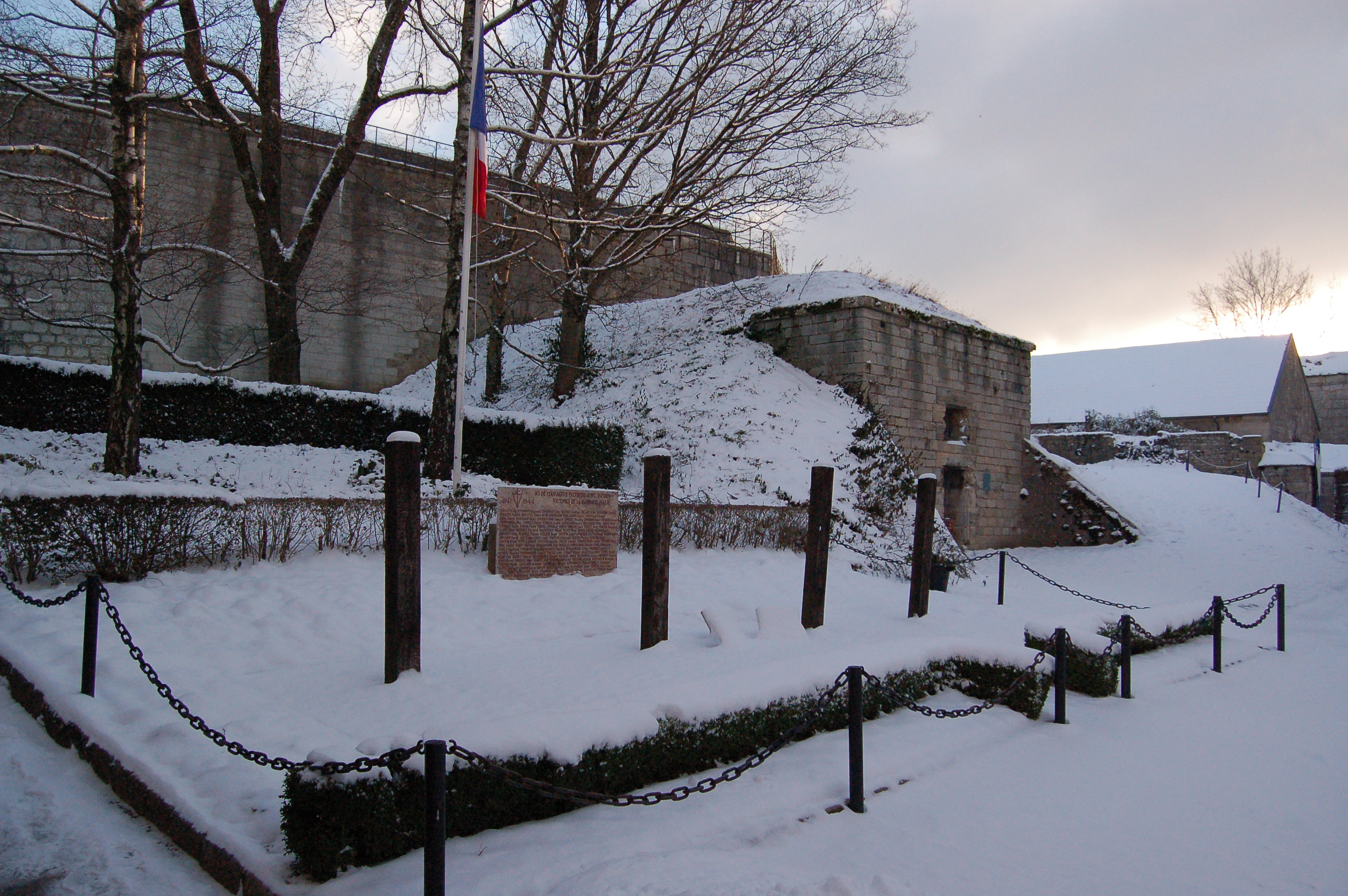
Memorial at the Citadel of Besançon to the Resistance fighters executed on 26 September 1943

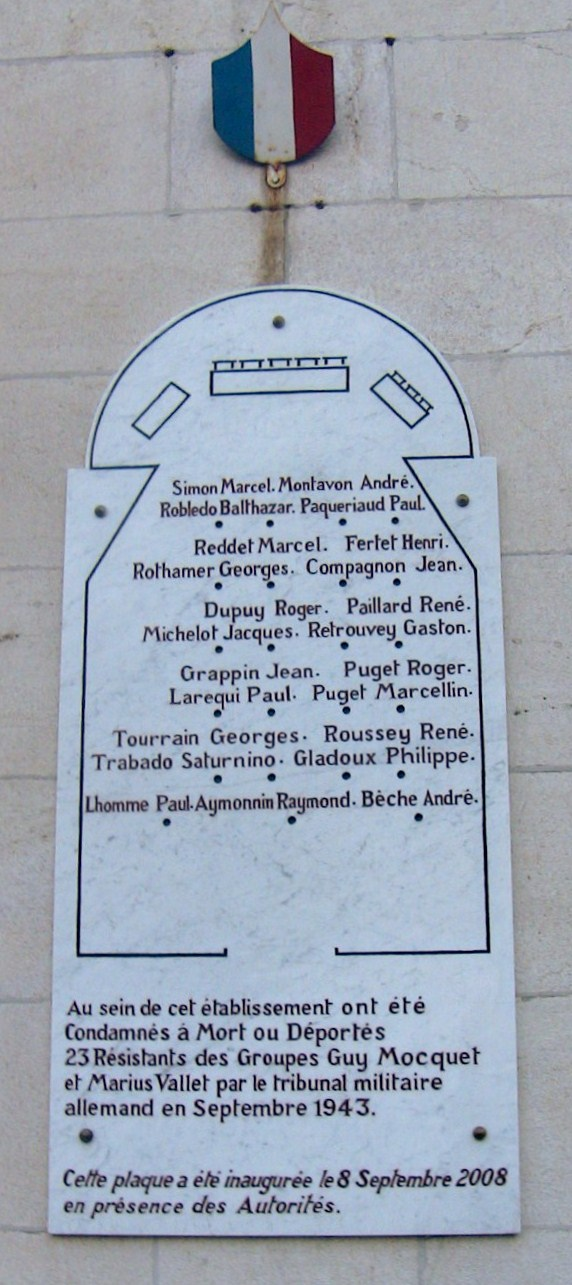
Memorial at Butte Prison

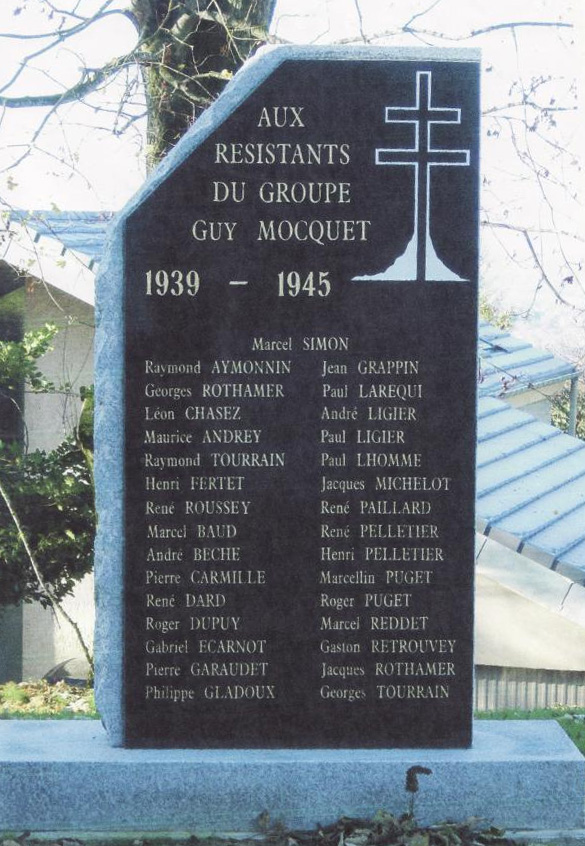
Memorial at Larnod, Doubs to Groupe Guy Mocquet
