= George David Coulon =

French-American painter

George David Coulon (November 14, 1822 – February 28, 1904) was a French-born artist, born in Seloncourt.

== Life ==
When he was ten years old, his family moved to New Orleans, Louisiana, USA. According to Coulon, "as a child, I made drawings and colored them with indigo, the juice of herbs and berries." His father, Georges-Louis Coulon (January 1, 1801-?), wanted him to apprentice in his watchmaker shop, but after a few trial months, he decided to follow his "natural inclination."

He studied in New Orleans with Toussaint Bigot, Louis David, François Fleischbein, Julien Hudson, and Jacques Amans in Paris, France with Anne-Louis Girodet. He received instruction in decorative painting under Antonio Mondelli.

== Work ==
Coulon assisted Leon Pomarede in painting a copy of Raphael's Transfiguration above the altar of St. Patrick's Church and helped fresco the ceiling of the criminal court in the Cabildo. Known for his landscapes, portraits, and religious paintings, Coulon worked as an artist and teacher in New Orleans for more than fifty years.

He was one of the founders of the Southern Art Union and the Artists' Association of New Orleans.

George David Coulon married Marie-Paoline Casbergue (1831–1914), a New Orleans native and artist in her own right known for still lifes of birds and game. They had two children, Mary Elizabeth Emma Coulon (1859–1928) and George Joseph Amede Coulon (1854–1922), who were also well-known artists.
