= Léon Delarbre =

French painter

Léon Delarbre (French pronunciation: [leɔ̃ dəlaʁbʁ]; 30 October 1889 – 20 May 1974) was a painter, museum curator, and World War II resistance fighter. After a career as a museum conservator and teacher in his hometown of Belfort, he joined the French resistance in 1941. Arrested in 1944, he was held in a series of concentration camps where he sketched scenes from camp life. These drawings have been widely used to illustrate the horrors of camp life.

== Biography ==
Delarbre was born into a family of watchmakers on 30 October 1889, in Masevaux in the Oberelsaß(he later commented that he was the grandchild, the child, and the father of a watchmaker.) and jewelers. In 1904 the family resettled in Belfort, in the part of the Haut-Rhin that remained French after the Treaty of Frankfurt (1871). Léon apprenticed with his father to become a jeweler, and studied the basics of painting.

In 1911, Delarbre joined the garrison of Versailles, and took advantage of his proximity to Paris to prepare for entry in the École nationale supérieure des arts décoratifs and the École des Beaux-Arts. Admitted to both in 1913, he chose to attend the "Arts Decos", but simultaneously studied oil painting with R. Collin at the Beaux-Arts. His studies were interrupted by World War I.

After demobilization in 1919, he joined with his brother Albert in taking up his father's jewelry business in 1921. Throughout this period he painted and participated in exhibitions. From 1925 to 1933, he collaborated (with Bersier, Conrad, Lecaron, Cochet and Le Molt) in the decoration of the renovated theater in Belfort. In 1929 he became the curator of the Belfort museum, and in 1935 he founded the Ecole des Beaux-Arts de Belfort, where he taught until his death. Among his students was a young Nicolai Michoutouchkine.

Too old to be mobilized for World War II, he joined the Volontaires de la Liberté, a group active in the French Resistance, in 1941. He was arrested on 3 January 1944 while hiding in his sister's apartment with his family; his daughter described the arrest, which took place in front of his children, and how a German Feldwebel tried to comfort her by saying "Krieg gross malheur!" At first incarcerated in Belfort and Compiègne he was deported to Auschwitz, Buchenwald, and Mittelbau-Dora. With the help of friends he managed to procure paper and pencils to depict scenes from the camps, saving the materials by keeping them close to his body while being moved from camp to camp, until he got to Bergen-Belsen, his last stop, where he was liberated by the Allies. The conditions of his environment required Delarbre to forgo his previous interest in drawing landscape, figure and still-life subjects in an academic manner; instead, in a "radical and conscious shift", he drew the human suffering he witnessed.

On his return to Paris his drawings were acquired by the Musée d'Art Moderne de la Ville de Paris and are now exhibited in the Musée de la Résistance et de la Déportation in Besançon. He returned to Belfort and his position in the museum and the Ecole des Beaux-Arts.

Delarbre became an honorary member of the Salon d'Automne and exhibited every year. He participated in group shows in Belfort, and was honored in 1959 with a retrospective exhibition. In 1953-1954, he did the underpaintings for five new windows in Belfort's Chapelle de la Brasse, and between 1950 and 1960 decorated two kindergartens. He died of heart failure on 20 May 1974 and is buried in the Brasse cemetery in Belfort.

== Works and legacy ==
Delarbre's sketches made during World War II, now categorized as "evidentiary Holocaust artwork", are frequently used to illustrate the horror of concentration camps. Delarbre drew on paper scraps and printed ordinances, often interrupting his work in the manufacturing of small arms in order to sketch. He drew labour commandos as they worked or retrieved the dead.

Especially notable is his famous drawing of the Muselmann character, a type for the camp prisoners who were doomed to die and had resigned themselves to their fate. Two of his drawings from Dora are in the permanent exhibition at Buchenwald, the camp where he also sketched the so-called Goethe Oak, under whose "charred limbs" he used to sit and compose verse. The efficacy of his rendering of the horror of the camps is attested to by Jacques Friedel.

The Belfort campus of the University of Franche-Comté was opened in 1990 and its law school is named for Delarbre; the city of Belfort named a street near the museum for him.

== See also ==
- Red triangle (badge)
