= Goethe Oak =

German oak trees allegedly linked to Goethe

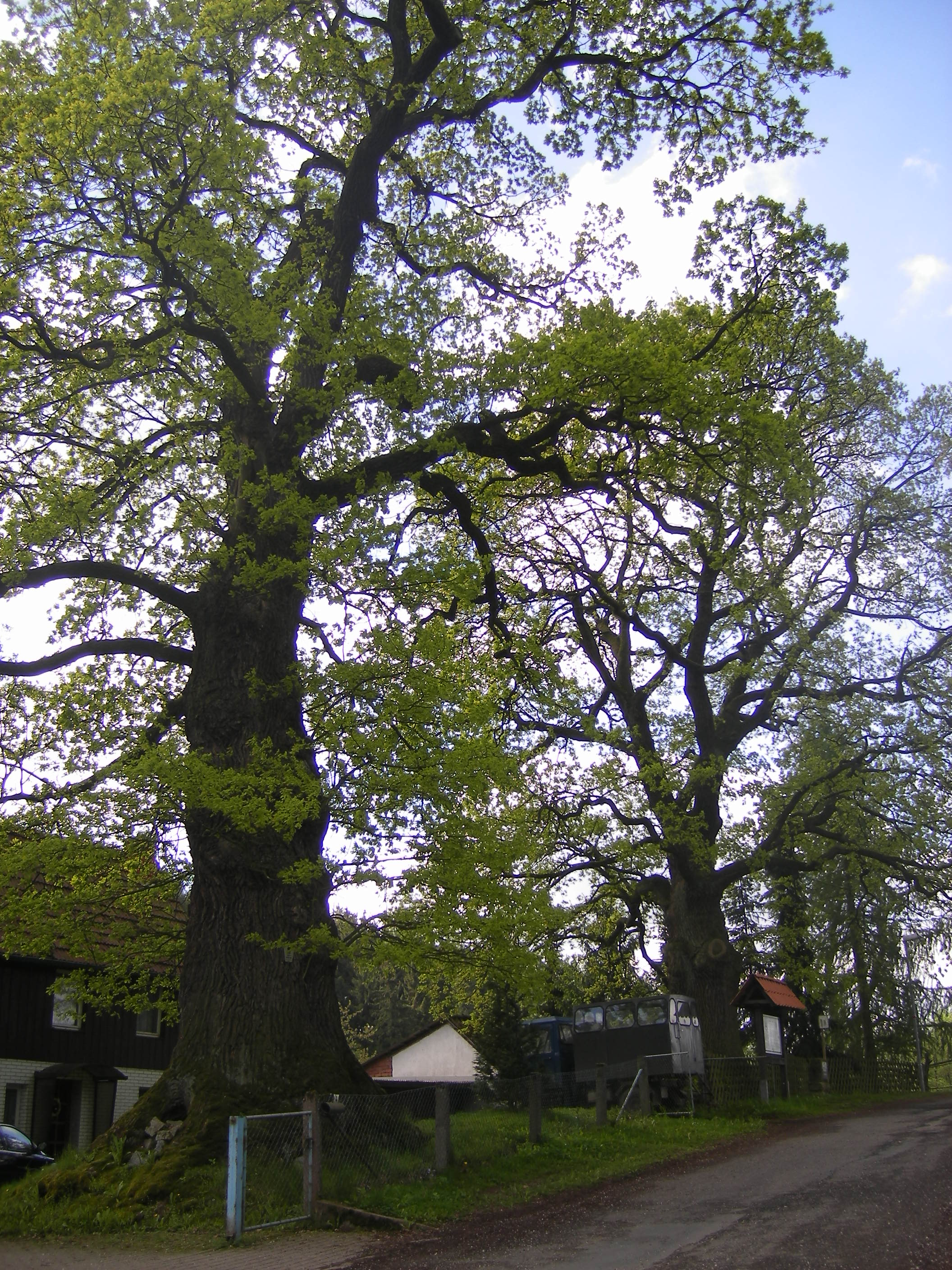
Goethe Oaks near Silkerode, Thuringia; Goethe, on his first tour of the Harz (1777), is supposed to have walked along them.

Goethe Oak (or Goethe's Oak), is a name given to a number of oak trees in Germany that are referred to in this way because they allegedly bear some sort of connection to the poet Johann Wolfgang von Goethe.

== History ==
Perhaps the most famous one is the oak tree near Weimar, Germany, on the Ettersberg, at the foot of which was the castle of Charlotte von Stein. The oak, in the middle of a beech forest, is named thus because it is supposedly the tree under which Goethe wrote "Wanderer's Nightsong", or, alternatively, the location where he composed the Walpurgisnacht passages of his Faust. The fate of the oak became in due course associated with the fate of Germany: if the one were to fall, so would the other.

According to the Buchenwald and Mittelbau-Dora Memorials Foundation, the name 'Goethe Oak' was simply an epithet made up by the inmates of Buchenwald camp in commemoration of the walks Goethe was known to have made in the area. The large, old tree had previously been labeled the Dicke Eiche (English:"thick oak") on maps of the area.

== The end of the Buchenwald oak ==
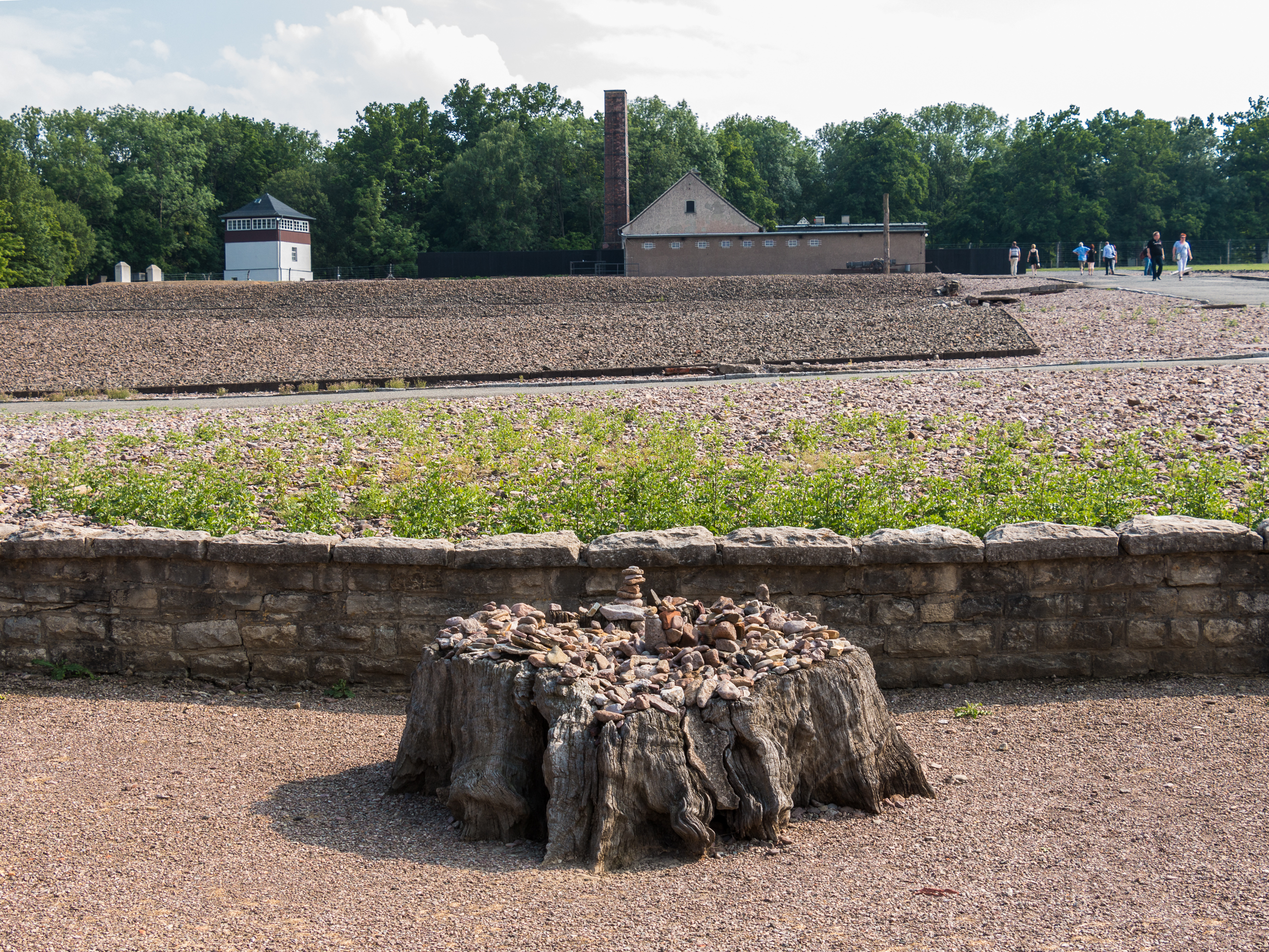
The remains of the Goethe Oak in the former Buchenwald concentration camp

The beech forest was cleared in 1937 to make way for the Buchenwald concentration camp. Originally the camp was to be called KL Ettersberg ("KL" for Konzentrationslager), but this was abandoned because the Ettersberg name was so closely connected to the life of Goethe. The tree stood in the center of the camp, and is reputed to have served also for the hanging and torture of prisoners. The tree was hit by an Allied incendiary bomb on 24 August 1944 and burned all night long. It is preserved (being cast in concrete under the auspices of the DDR government, which also laid a plaque saying "Goethe Eiche") and is part of the Buchenwald memorial. For the SS guards and the prisoners, the tree held two completely different meanings: for the SS it was a link to the Germany they thought they represented, but for the prisoners the tree pointed to a different Germany from the one they experienced in the camp. According to Amos Oz, the incorporation of the oak in the camp and its subsequent destruction are evidence that the Nazis destroyed their own heritage. In Der Totenwald, camp survivor Ernst Wiechert recalls standing under the oak and reflecting on the two Germanies it represented—what later scholars would call the "Januskopf Deutschlands", the Weimar-Buchenwald dichotomy. The tree gave its name to another book by a survivor, Pierre Julitte's L'Arbre de Goethe (1965). The oak was sketched by Léon Delarbre, who used to sit under its "charred limbs" and compose poetry.

== Other Goethe oaks ==
Another Goethe oak is in Krásný Dvůr Castle in Bohemia (today in the Czech Republic), estimated to be 1000 years old. The Arnsberg Forest Nature Park in Sauerland claims one as well (a beech named for Friedrich Schiller fell victim to a storm in 2007).
