= Groupe Feministe Socialiste =

- Abbreviation: GFS
- Founded: 1899
- Founder: Louise Saumoneau; Élisabeth Renaud
- Dissolved: 1905
- Location: France
- Official language: French

The Groupe Feministe Socialiste was founded in 1899 by Louise Saumoneau and Élisabeth Renaud, both working class socialists who wished to bring feminism to the working class in France. The socialist movement and the feminist movement both existed, but had little overlap prior to this point.

== History ==
Over four million French women were working outside the home in non-agricultural labor at the turn of the century, but they lacked representation in the organized reform efforts. The Groupe Feministe Socialiste hoped to provide a place for representation of working class women.

The original manifesto of the Groupe Feministe Socialiste stated that they wanted to end the "double oppression of women, exploited on a large scale by capitalism, subject to men by laws and especially by prejudice."

The group gained popularity quickly, but it suffered from disinterest from male socialists as well as class conflict between the bourgeois and proletariat feminists.

A good example of this class conflict can be seen in the suggestion made at a 1900 convention that domestic servants receive a full day off per week, a measure already adapted for industrial workers. Bourgeois feminists hesitated. While "humanitarian enough to accept reforms in principle, they balked when such reforms threatened their way of life."

Groupe Feministe Socialiste experienced some strife in the form of conflict between its two founders, who had had their differences from the beginning. Élisabeth Renaud's goals were conciliatory; she hoped to bridge the gap between socialism and bourgeois feminism. Louise Saumoneau, on the other hand, hated the bourgeois feminists, feeling that they were irrevocably out of touch with the realities of the working class.

In 1902, Renaud left the party, leaving Saumoneau to run the party. The Groupe Feministe Socialiste survived until 1905, when the various socialist groups currently existing in France unified, leaving the GFS outside of the newly formed Section Francaise de L'Internationale Ouvriere. That combined with Saumoneau's "uncompromising" stance, spelled the demise of the Groupe Feministe Socialiste.
