= Protestantism in Besançon =

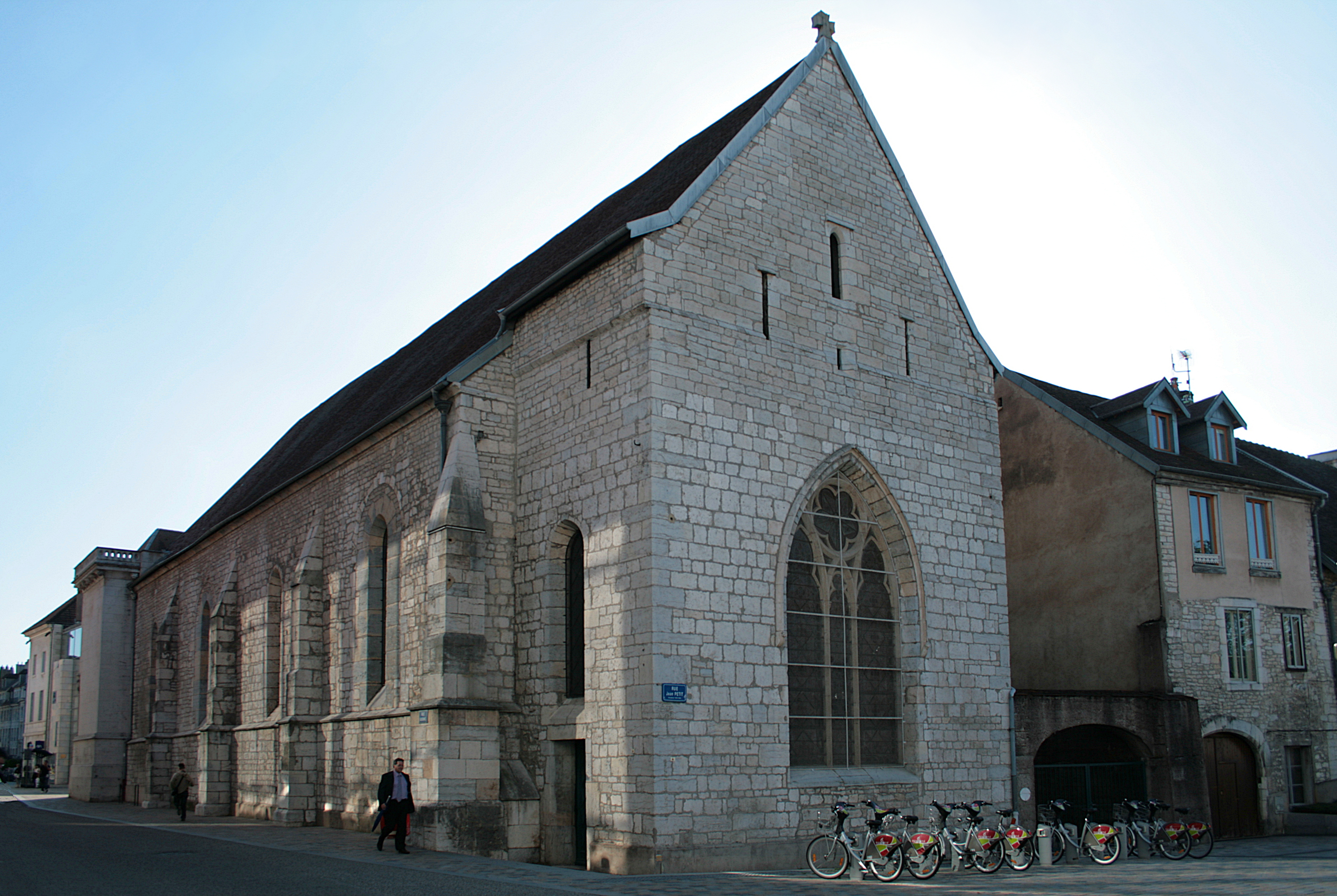
The Temple du Saint-Esprit, used by the community since 1842, marks the historical importance of the local congregation.

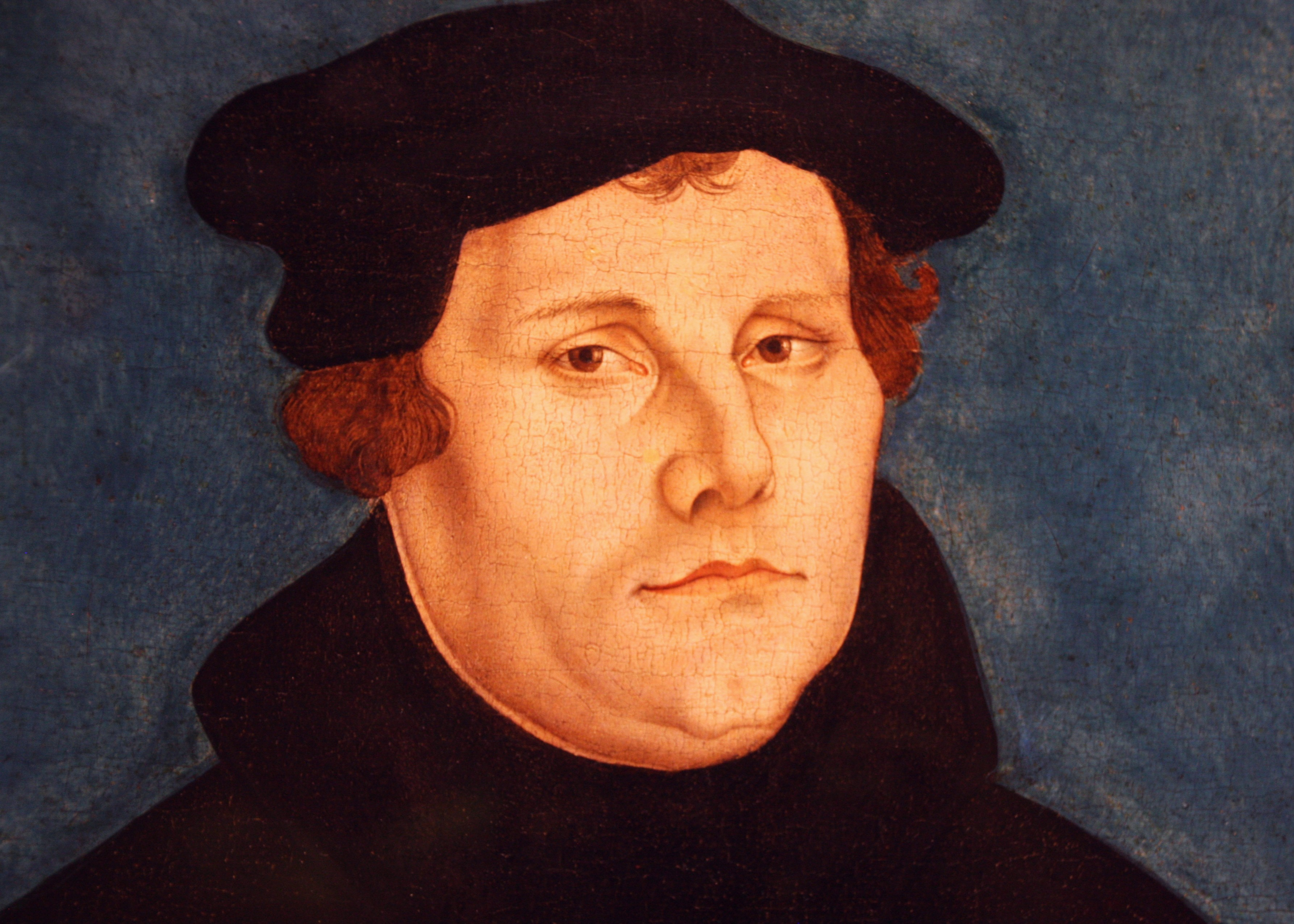
Martin Luther, initiator of the Reformation, author of the Ninety-five Theses in 1517.

Protestantism in Besançon encompasses the historical presence and development of Protestantism in the French city of Besançon and its surrounding area.

Protestant ideas first appeared in Besançon in the late 1530s, when preachers began attracting adherents among segments of the population. Despite the city's deeply entrenched Catholic traditions, the spread of Reformed ideas was facilitated by ongoing missionary efforts, a social climate receptive to ethical and religious renewal, and geographical proximity to the recently Protestant Principality of Montbéliard and Switzerland. Opposition from Catholic authorities labelled these adherents Huguenots and "heretics". After decades of growth and conflict, the situation culminated in the Battle of Besançon during the French Wars of Religion. The Catholic forces prevailed, leading to the suppression of Protestant worship in the city; many Protestants were forced either to abjure their faith or go into exile.

Protestantism remained prohibited in Besançon until the French Revolution in 1789, when freedom of worship was established. This allowed the formation of an official Protestant congregation, bolstered by the arrival of Swiss immigrants. The community organised around the Temple of the Holy Spirit and acquired the Champs-Bruley cemetery. Throughout the 19th and 20th centuries, the parish grew through integration into national Lutheran and Calvinist structures and the development of parish activities.

In addition to the historic Reformed and Lutheran congregation affiliated with the United Protestant Church of France, several other Protestant or Protestant-related groups have established a presence in Besançon. These include Pentecostal, Mennonite, Evangelical, Baptist, Adventist, independent churches, as well as The Church of Jesus Christ of Latter-day Saints and Jehovah's Witnesses. Some of these trace their origins to earlier movements such as the Anabaptists, while others arrived after World War II or developed through the Charismatic movement.

In 1999, the mainline Protestant parish had approximately 2,000 members. The community has traditionally maintained a low public profile, a characteristic attributed to its historical experience of persecution and specific sociological factors. Protestantism, as a religious minority alongside the city's Jewish and Muslim communities, forms part of Besançon's religious and cultural heritage.

== History ==
=== Background ===
==== Religion in Besançon ====
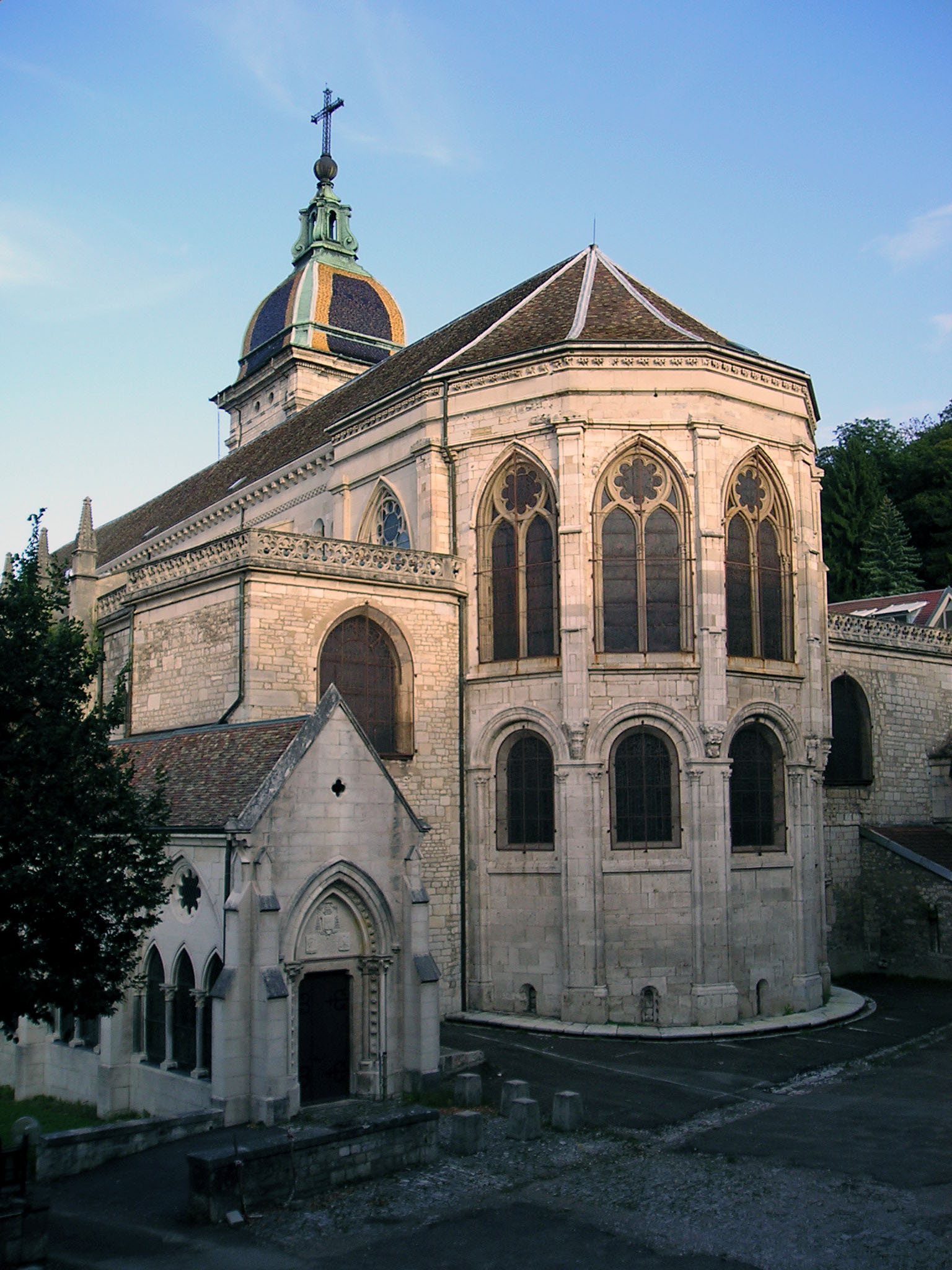
Saint-Jean Cathedral, the mother church and seat of the Archdiocese of Besançon.

From the evangelization of Franche-Comté in the 3rd century century by the saints and martyrs Ferjeux and Ferrutio, Latin-rite Christianity gradually became the almost exclusive religion of the inhabitants. (Note: La vie religieuse à Besançon, du 2nd century à 2010, p. 6.) Roman Catholicism penetrated all strata of Bisontine society over the centuries without major obstacles, at a time when the Church was an integral part of private and public life. (Note: La vie religieuse à Besançon, du 2nd century à 2010, p. 3.) However, the appearance in the 14th century century of a local Jewish community is noted, which always remained on the margins. After a millennium of near-total domination by Catholicism in Besançon, the Protestant Reformation began to take hold from the 1520s. It spread in the region even after the Council of Trent. The Comtois capital and the Doubs were then regarded as bastions of Catholicism against Protestantism, and most inhabitants defended the Catholic traditions and the Franc-Comtois clergy. It would take a fierce battle between the two communities to decide the outcome.

==== Reformation in France ====
As early as 1520, Lutheran ideas developed in France. At the Synod of Chanforan in 1536, William Farel and the rallied Waldensians obtained funding to print the Bible in French. From 1540, increasingly abundant Protestant literature, transmitted orally, spread especially after the publication in French of the Institution chrétienne in 1541. John Calvin, from Geneva, took charge of religious organization and unified French Protestants. From 1555, previously autonomous groups structured themselves into assemblies directed by a consistory. Calvin sent dozens of missionaries to help build the new organization. By 1560, there were around forty assemblies. Their success was very great, and by late 1561, there were more than 670 Reformed churches in the kingdom. It is estimated that at that time more than a quarter of the kingdom's population was Protestant, mostly Reformed, before the Catholic Church reacted, marking the start of the wars of religion.

=== Renewal ===
==== French Revolution and emancipatory immigration ====
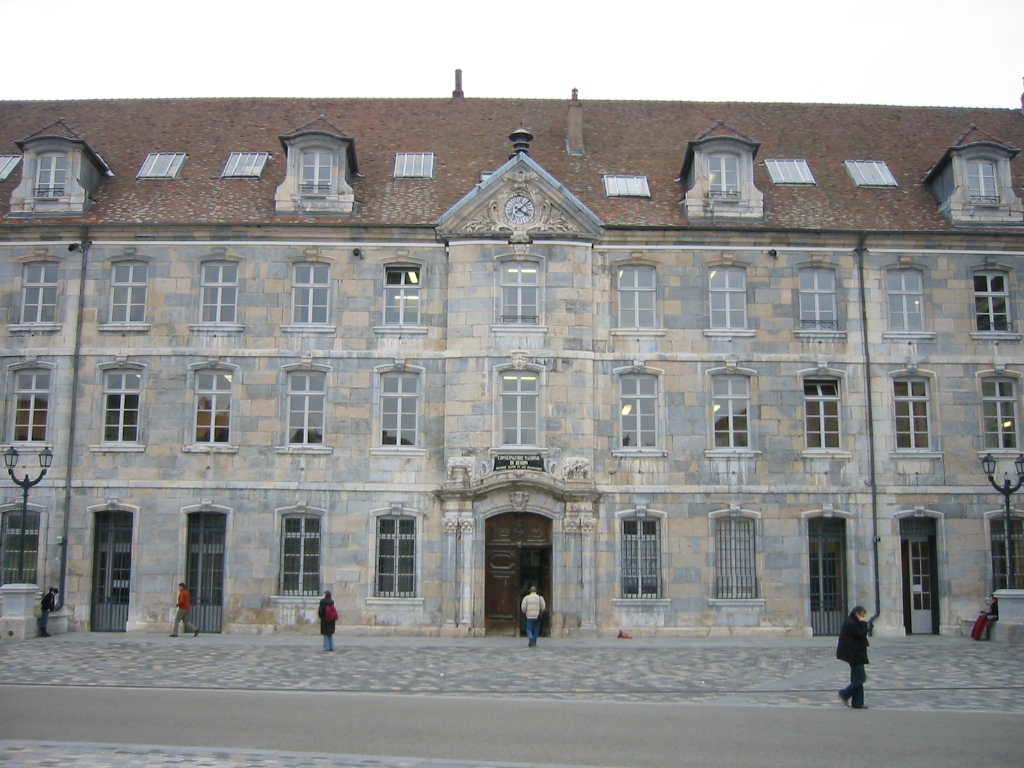
The former grain store of Besançon, used as a place of worship by Protestant soldiers in garrison

In 1778, the city of Besançon was ordered to provide premises for Protestant soldiers in the garrison of the 65th Line Infantry Regiment based at Sonnenberg. (Note: La vie religieuse à Besançon, du 2nd century à 2010, p. 89.) In the stores of the former grain warehouse at Place de la Révolution, the hundred or so soldiers and officers were able to practice their worship, with a formal prohibition on local residents attending the sermons. In reality, this was less the result of an evolution than an obligation. Evidence includes the outright refusal by the Parliament of Besançon to accept a relatively tolerant edict in 1787, which only became known in the pre-revolutionary period. (Note: La vie religieuse à Besançon, du 2nd century à 2010, p. 90.) The edict was nevertheless imposed in 1788 along with thirteen other measures more favorable to Protestants. But it was the Revolution that overturned mentalities and legislation in 1789: on 26 August, Protestants acquired the right to exist under the Declaration of the Rights of Man and of the Citizen, whose Article 10 proclaims the right to practice the religion of one's choice provided it does not disturb public order. From then on, the Protestant community, which had officially ceased to exist in Besançon for more than two centuries, resurfaced thanks in part to regained freedom of worship and especially to Swiss immigration. (Note: Quand Besançon se donne à lire : essais en anthropologie urbaine, p. 57.) In 1793, a group of 80 Calvinist watchmakers, including Laurent Mégevand, settled in the city and founded the watchmaking industrial center. They were soon followed by 22 watchmaker families, totaling between 400 and 700 people.

This immigration to Besançon revived the Protestant community. The Swiss were mostly Reformed and benefited from the protection of the revolutionary government, which saw in this influx of skilled population—over 80% watchmaking artisans—a substantial economic contribution. Many Reformed individuals, whether immigrants or not, were also members of Bisontine Freemasonry, predominantly in the "Sincère et Parfaite Union" lodge, likely demonstrating their desire for progress. Between 1793 and 1796, the Protestant community recorded 1,855 citizens out of the 22,000 inhabitants of the city, or 8% of the total population. They were still called the "Swiss community", even though most later obtained French nationality de jure. Originally, three-quarters came from the principalities of Neuchâtel, Geneva, and Bâle. On 11 November, a "welcoming decree" was officially proclaimed; the "Swiss community" settled mainly in the sectors of La Boucle and Battant, preferably around Square Saint-Amour, where watchmaking workshops flourished. Gradually, they integrated into Bisontine society, although a significant portion of the local population rejected them. This ostracism gradually faded.

==== From institutionalization to the present day ====
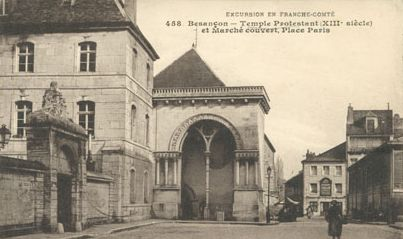
The Temple du Saint-Esprit, the place of worship for the Reformed community. Here on a postcard shortly before World War II.

In 1796, the mayor of Besançon lent the Chapelle Notre-Dame-du-Refuge, which became, after the former grain store, the first place of worship officially granted to the Protestant community. In reality, it was only effectively used from 25 December until the end of 1804. (see also the detailed section on Protestant places of worship in Besançon). Opened in 1793, the Champs Bruley Cemetery was intended to receive the remains of Protestants with dignity. (Note: Quand Besançon se donne à lire : essais en anthropologie urbaine, p. 59.) Jacques-Frédéric Lambercier was the first pastor to officiate in 1794. He was succeeded by Courlat from Geneva between 1796 and 1803. A Protestant school opened in 1802 and closed in 1891 in favor of municipal schools. A hospice for the elderly was created, which still exists, transformed into a social aid fund. (Note: La vie religieuse à Besançon, du 2nd century à 2010, p. 91.) Pastor Courlat was replaced under the Concordat by Jean-Henry Ebray. The community truly found its place thanks to this pastor, who knew how to take advantage of the organic laws of the Concordat and the tolerance finally granted by local civil and religious authorities, in the persons of Prefect Jean de Bry and the irenic Archbishop Claude Le Coz. In 1805, the community moved to the former Capuchin convent, as Saint-Jacques Hospital demanded the return of the chapel. Finally, following the opening of the arsenal, it settled in the former Church of the Holy Spirit, which the faithful definitively acquired in 1842. Meanwhile, in 1824, the "organization of the Reformed Church of Besançon" was officially created.

In 1835, Besançon had two pastors and three Protestant schools. A demographic study recorded 90 baptisms, 33 marriages (21 of which were mixed), and 76 deaths in 1856, for a total of 2,100 faithful in Besançon and 600 more in the surrounding area. The first mixed marriages initially united Swiss and French Reformed, then increasingly Swiss and French Catholics, accelerating community dilution. From the mid-19th century, a new wave of immigration from the Montbéliard region reinforced the community, including the Comtois historian Charles-Léopold Duvernoy (1774–1850). Other exiles joined the ranks of the Reformation to a lesser extent: Alsatians who refused to remain under Prussia after the Franco-Prussian War. In general, unlike the Swiss, Protestants of the era, especially foreigners, were better accepted by the population, partly because watchmaking was no longer the monopoly of this single ethno-religious congregation, and partly because the Reformation was much better tolerated.

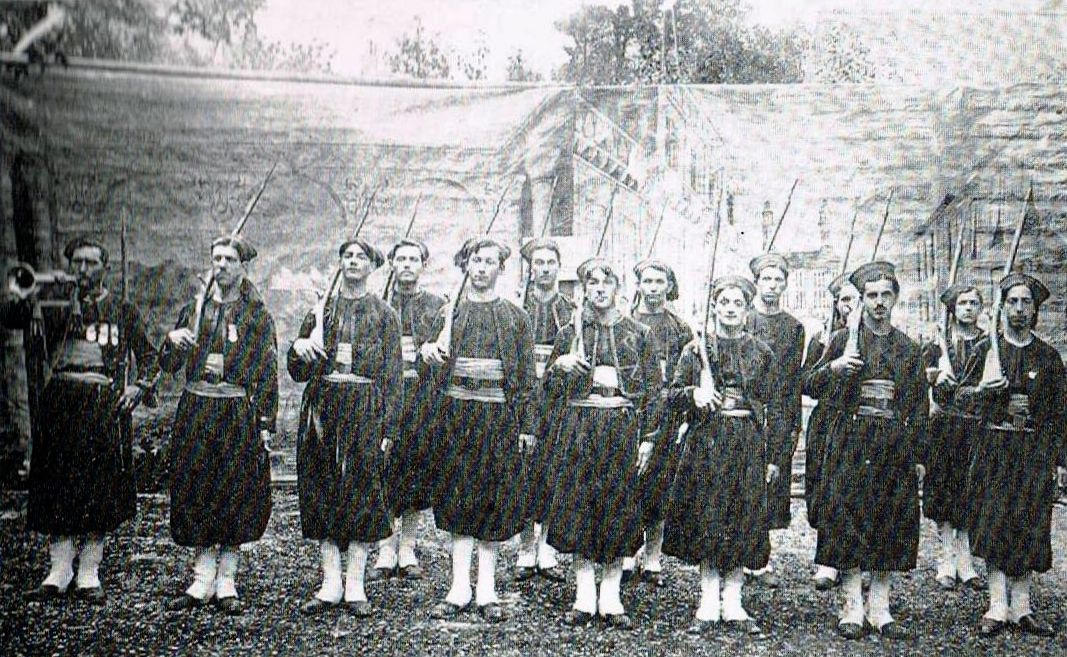
L'Union des Bousbots de Besançon.

By the end of the 19th century, Protestants were full citizens of the city despite some notable incidents: the renaming of Rue Saint-Vincent to Rue Mégevand and debate clashes following the political agitation of the Dreyfus Affair. During the separation of Church and State, an inventory was carried out at the Temple on 29 January in the presence of Pastor Cadix, then president of the presbyteral council, two other pastors, and the diaconate treasurers. All submitted to the law without resistance, unlike many Bisontine Catholic parishes that were quite hostile. The Concordat was thus abrogated, and a certain freedom, particularly financial, was regained. However, new expenses caused by the community's particular synodal system were unforeseen, leading to the elimination of one pastor position. Modeled on Catholic youth groups, "L'Union des Bousbots de Besançon" was founded between the late 19th and early 20th centuries. World War I plunged the community into turmoil like the rest of France, losing 51 members whose names are engraved on a marble plaque inside the temple. The parish, with 600 members in 1910, benefited from solid local implantation, confirmed by growth peaking at 3,700 parishioners in 1936. Throughout the 20th century, the parish organized to provide particularly open and effective social aid, notably initiating a hospice, a preventorium, and a center for young workers (see the detailed section on the parish's social works).

However, after World War II, Besançon's Reformed community lost much of its importance. Prominent members left the city. Above all, rampant dechristianization affected Protestantism as much as Catholicism. To make matters worse, an internal schism—now resolved—seriously endangered the Bisontine Protestant Church, costing it a pastor and faithful. In the postwar period, numerous evangelical movements emerged, such as the Besançon Pentecost in the 1970s, the Cépée Church in the 1990s, and more recently several other small groups (see the detailed section on other Protestant movements). Today, the Protestant parish of Besançon counts 736 registered families, or about 2,500 people, guided by two pastors responsible for the central temple in Besançon and various other locations in the rest of Franche-Comté. Vestiges of a glorious and tormented past, surnames of Huguenot descendants—such as Adler, Ducommun, Étienne, Favre, Girod, Guinard, Mathey, Sandoz, Savoy—abound in the city.

== Community organization ==
=== Protestant institutions ===
==== Parish ====
Organization

The Protestant institutions that are members of the United Protestant Church of France are represented locally in the form of 1905-law worship associations—the “parishes”—which are grouped into “consistories” and then into “regions,” equivalent to the parishes, dioceses, and archdioceses of the Catholic Church. Besançon has had its own 1905-law association (Note: Quand Besançon se donne à lire : essais en anthropologie urbaine, p. 65.) since 1905 (Note: La vie religieuse à Besançon, du 2nd century à 2010, p. 95.), forming together with the parishes of Morteau, Pontarlier, Lons-le-Saunier, and Dole the “Consistory of Franche-Comté.” The whole forms the “Eastern Region” together with non-concordatory Lorraine (Note: La vie religieuse à Besançon, du 2nd century à 2010, p. 96.). The parish of Besançon more precisely covers the towns of Besançon, Gray, and Ornans and extends over an area of seventy to ninety kilometres (Note: Quand Besançon se donne à lire : essais en anthropologie urbaine, p. 60.). It is characterized by a high number of declared members compared with the national average—approximately 800 families, or 2,000 individuals, mostly urban.

The Protestant parishes co-govern the “Eastern Region” of the Church through a regional parliament called the “regional synod,” which decides on the Church’s missions and commitments at the regional level and gives its opinion on questions of faith debated nationally (which fall under the National Synod). A “regional council” supports the life of the local churches, prepares the work of the regional synod sessions, manages shared regional missions (mainly training, information, and youth activities), and pays the pastors. The parish is governed by a “presbyteral council,” a college of parishioners elected by universal suffrage in the General Assembly for four-year terms renewable twice. The pastors are ex officio members of this college but are not its “leaders”; they accompany the council in its mission. The council decides on spiritual, liturgical, material, and organizational orientations. It appoints a lay president who is its spokesperson and the legal signatory of the local church. Before the 1970s, the Besançon temple had no presbytery, and the pastors lived in town.

Pastors

The pastors, spiritual leaders of the community, have succeeded one another in the Besançon parish since its creation in 1793. Two of them—Jacques-Frédéric Lambercier and N. Courlat—were the first in the community before the implementation of the Concordat. For this reason, their names do not appear in some sources, as they were non-concordatory and de facto not assigned to the parish. If they are included in the list below, there have been 37 pastors in Besançon since 1796.

- Jacques-Frédéric Lambercier (1794–?)
- N. Courlat (1796–1803)
- Jean-Henry Ebray (1803–1808)
- Samuel Jan de Tramelans (1808–1814)
- Mathieu Miroglio (1814–1865)
- Paul Mathieu (1858–1861)
- Philippe Sandoz (1821–1859)
- Georges Collins and Paul Miroglio (son) (1861–1866)
- Méaly Ladreyt (1868–1888)
- Albert Cadix (1873–1910)
- Élie Abt (1866–1906)
- Maurice Bas (1886–1909)
- Jules Pyt (1898–1925)
- Adrien Metzger (1909–1924)
- Paul Rozier (1910–1922)
- Louis Marsauche (1925–1951)
- Henri Gerbeau (1949–1952)
- Pierre Galland (1952–1957)
- Jean-Marie Lambert (1952–1957)
- Guy Bonnal (1957–1968)
- André Bourbon (1958–1963)
- Jacques Riou (1963–1968)
- Pierre Bay (1968–1979)
- Philippe Soullier (1970–1975)
- Christian Delors (1970–1970)
- Alain Kursner (1976–1977)
- Jean-Marc Metin (1979–1981)
- Pierre Dumas (1981–1987)
- Otto Schaefer (1982–1987)
- Édith Heitz Kessler (1985–1986)
- Jacques Blanc (1987–1989)
- Jean-Marc Heintz (1987–1989)
- Pierre Boismorand (1989–1991)
- Marc Weiss (1990–1995)
- Nicolas Mourgues (1991–2002)
- Anne-Marie Feillens (1995–2009)
- Éric Demange (2002–2012)
- Pierre-Emmanuel Panis (2009–)
- Emmanuelle Seyboldt (2013–2017)
- Andreas Seyboldt (2013–present)

==== Social works ====
As early as 1793, a mutual aid fund was created by the city’s Protestant watchmakers. It became the “Mutual Aid Society” in 1851 before being renamed the “Diaconate”. However, the social work was truly established from 1903 under the name Protestant Asylums of Besançon and divided into three branches: La Retraite for the elderly, La Famille for young workers, and Le Préventorium for sick children (Note: Quand Besançon se donne à lire : essais en anthropologie urbaine, p. 58.). Open to all, these structures still exist today in identical or similar form and are grouped under the Association Protestante d’Action Sociale.

La Retraite

La Retraite was founded by Pastor Méaly Ladreyt and Sister Bauer between 1865 and 1888. It was originally a civil association with the status of “share capital company,” named Protestant Hospice for the Sick and Elderly. With an initial capacity of 12 beds at Les Founottes from 1873 to 1879, the institute grew rapidly. The future building at Les Vaites was constructed in 1877 on a two-hectare plot on Rue de Belfort. From 1878 it included a chapel for worship financed by patrons. It is characterized by the two Bible verses engraved on the main entrance: "Come unto me, all ye that labour and are heavy laden, and I will give you rest. Matt XI:28" and "In my Father’s house are many mansions: if it were not so, I would have told you. I go to prepare a place for you. John XIV. 2.". Recognized as a public utility in 1880, the association grew thanks to subsidies, watchmaking patronage, and a generous donation of one million francs from benefactor Francis-Louis Bersot. A second wing was built in 1889, and the establishment could accommodate 50 people by 1896. Fully completed in 1899, a side building was added in 1911. It received water in 1906 and electricity in 1924. La Retraite had 70 beds in 1934. The “Pavillon Bertrand” dates from 1964. It underwent a final expansion between 1975 and 1991, adding 52 beds with the help of the municipality. Although the institute still exists, it is autonomous from the parish under the stricter public-utility rules imposed by the General Council of Doubs. It retains its status as a 1901-law association. A non-profit medicalized establishment, it has an Alzheimer’s unit and a total of 123 beds.

La Famille – Le Préventorium

La Famille was founded by Pastor Maurice Bas in 1902 to house young workers aged 15 to 25. Located on Rue des Cras, it operated until the 1970s before being closed due to lack of space. The Préventorium was designed to help sick children and those in precarious situations. After World War I, under Pastor Adrien Metzger, children from the region and Alsace, mostly Protestant but including some Catholics, benefited from the saline baths at La Mouillère. They were housed in six barracks on Rue de Belfort. In 1919, although the Préventorium, now located at Fontaine-Argent, faced competition from the Salins de Bregille, it continued to help 300 children in 1909, 506 in 1915, 730 in 1929, and 545 in 1934. Recognized as a public utility in 1922, it experienced a surge in population after four buildings were constructed on a six-hectare site and inaugurated in 1927, visited in 1933 by President Albert Lebrun. It now houses the Institute for Specialized Education, where a team of educators cares for children with mental disabilities, either as boarders or day students. In addition to general subjects, it teaches vocational and technical subjects such as horticulture, woodworking, and technical employment for local authorities. The establishment has a contract of association with the State, enabling it to receive financial aid from the General Council of Doubs.

=== Sociological and ritual data ===
==== Society ====
The Protestant parish of Besançon had approximately 2,000 faithful in 1999, the majority of them urban dwellers. Members of the Bisontine community mostly belong to the middle class. They are mainly teachers, civil servants, doctors, and people working in industry and services. Three “groups” of Protestants can be distinguished: the “old” Protestants who have been in the region for several generations and regularly follow the precepts and rites of the Reformed Church; the “new” Protestants recently settled in the city; and finally the Protestants “by tradition” who are baptized, married, and buried at the temple. About forty children attend Bible school, and thirty attend catechism. If one counts children from mixed marriages (most often Catholic-Protestant), the number of young Protestants in Besançon is relatively high (Note: Quand Besançon se donne à lire : essais en anthropologie urbaine, p. 61.). The least numerous are those aged 20 to 30, students or just starting their careers, who are subject to great mobility. The Bisontine Protestant population has a core of committed faithful involved in intra- and inter-parish activities whose stated aim is "to integrate every believer into the parish" and "to extend the community beyond the religious sphere".

==== Protestant identity ====
According to Ingar Düring, the community appears “popularly non-existent” in Besançon. Although its members are open to contemporary society, they live their religion in the private sphere (Note: Quand Besançon se donne à lire : essais en anthropologie urbaine, p. 63.). Unlike the Jewish, Muslim, or even Catholic communities, there is no real “Protestant identity” as such. Ingar Düring offers the following explanations: on the one hand, the Protestant faith is very much a minority in Besançon, and the painful history of the Reformation forced the faithful to remain very discreet; on the other hand, Bisontine Protestants are secularized and do not ostentatiously display their community membership; finally, individualism is more pronounced than in other faiths, despite a sense of belonging to the temple and a certain openness to others. In this context, few notables have publicly identified as Protestant, with the exceptions of the industrialist-benefactor François-Louis Bersot and mayor Robert Schwint.

=== Confessional infrastructure ===
==== Places of worship ====
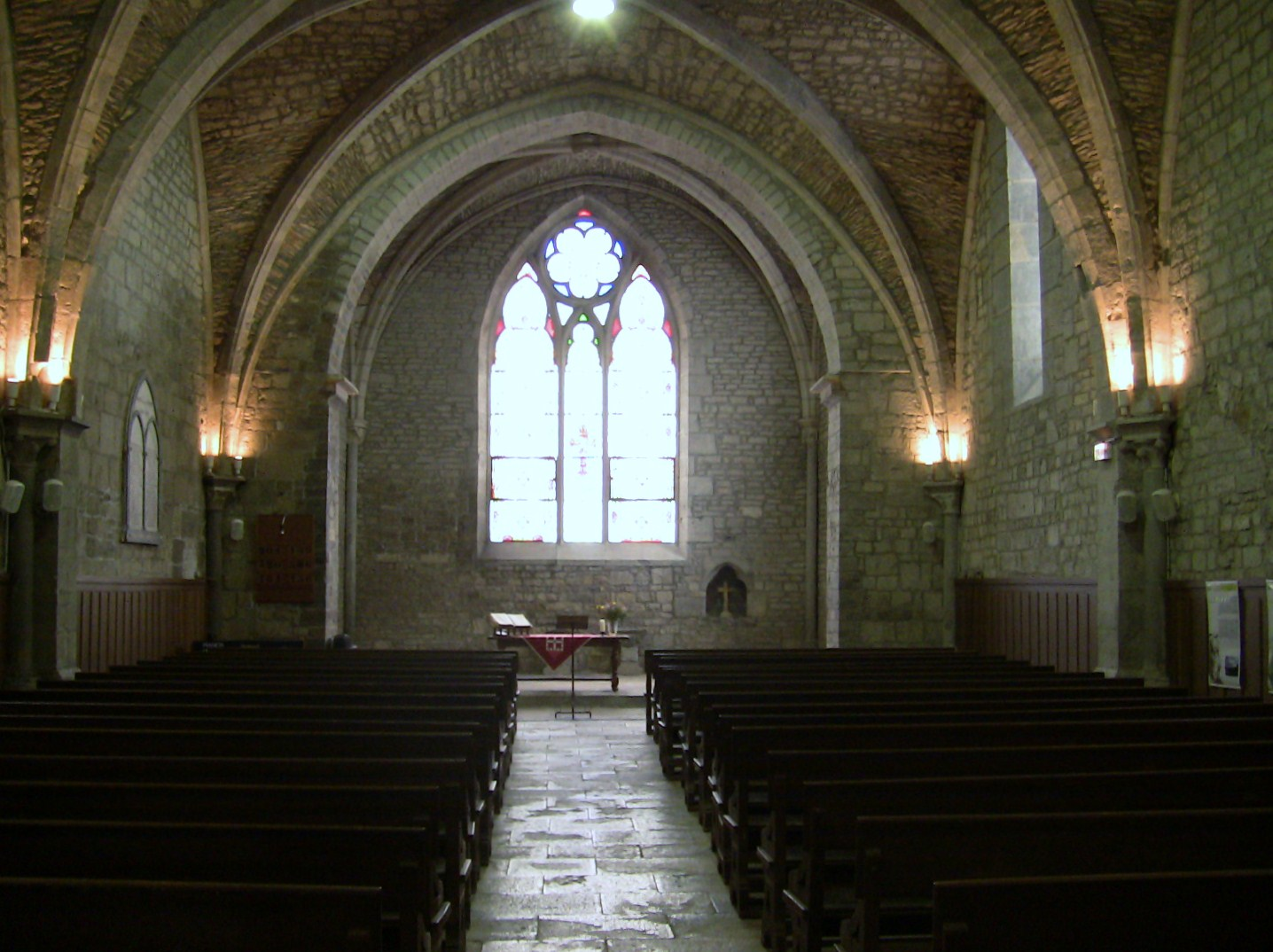
Interior of the temple.

Private houses were initially chosen as preaching venues before the community had rooms dedicated solely to prayer and worship (Note: La vie religieuse à Besançon, du 2nd century à 2010, pp. 92 and 93.). The former grain store was the very first place of worship, but it was reserved for Swiss soldiers in garrison. It was not until 1796 that Protestants had their first real temple: they were temporarily lent the former “Chapelle du Refuge,” today called the Chapelle Notre-Dame-du-Foyer. Forced to leave this church due to it being reclaimed by the Catholic community, the Protestants moved in 1804 for a time to the former Capuchin convent near Chamars. After several injunctions, they were again ordered to vacate the building, which was handed over to the army to serve as an arsenal. In 1826, the Reformed, who first drew up numerous plans for construction or adaptation of old premises, finally settled on the former hospice of the Holy Spirit, which they permanently occupied in 1842.

The Hospital of the Holy Spirit was founded in Besançon in 1207 by the Hospitaller Order of the Holy Spirit and underwent several architectural modifications during its history. Throughout the Middle Ages it welcomed the sick, pregnant women, the elderly, travellers, and orphans. By agreement with the municipality of Besançon, from the 16th century it limited its aid to children, women, and passers-by. In 1792, the building was renamed “Hospice des Enfants de la Patrie.” Hospital services were transferred in 1797 to the newly built Saint-Jacques Hospital, which became the city’s central hospital. The vacated former building was officially handed over to the city’s Protestants after renovation in 1841 by the Bisontine architect Alphonse Delacroix, who gave the church a new neo-Gothic porch in the Troubadour style. On 28 April, the dedication ceremony of the Temple of the Holy Spirit took place, which remains the central place of the Protestant community of Besançon. It is the only permanent Reformed Protestant place of worship in the city; the annex chapel of the La Retraite social centre is used only occasionally.

==== Cemetery ====
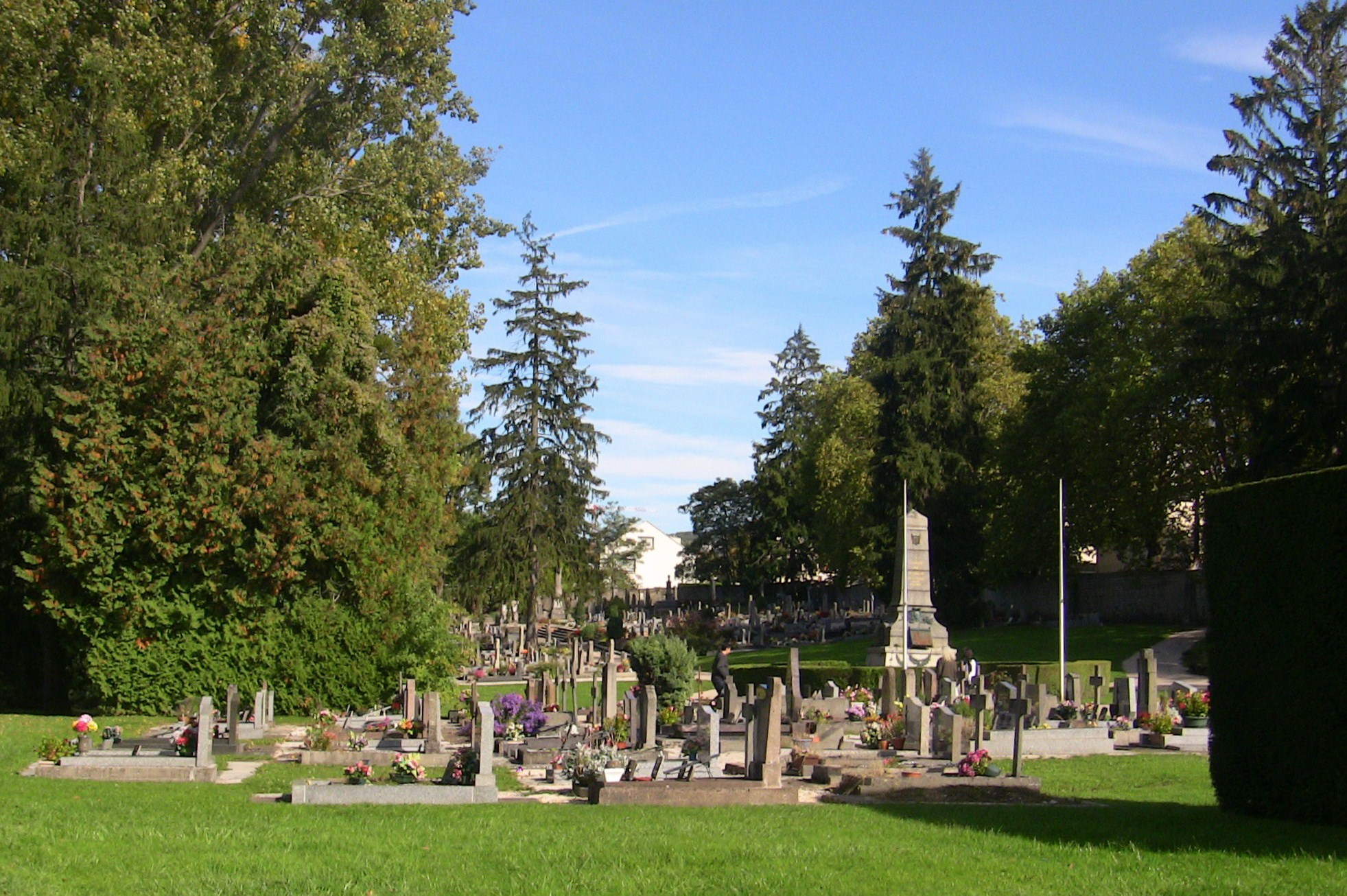
Champs Bruley Cemetery.

The first Reformed, recognized as “heretics,” were buried in ditches around the Arènes sector in ground considered indecent by the Catholic Church. After the Revolution, Protestants started to be buried in the Champs Bruley Cemetery, the oldest municipal cemetery in the city, opened in 1793. A burial place for local Protestants and many Bisontines of Swiss origin, the old part still contains several tombs from past eras. Beneath the slab of a memorial monument lie the remains of 2,179 officers and non-commissioned officers who fell during the Franco-Prussian War. Two memorials commemorate the lives of the Bisontine painter Jean Gigoux and benefactor Louis Bersot. The site has retained a “Protestant section,” but it is no longer reserved for members of the community and has lost almost all religious connotation.

== Other religious movements ==
Alongside the mainly Lutheran and Calvinist Protestants united within the parish of the United Protestant Church of France, many other movements claim a common historical or spiritual ancestry. They are locally represented by Pentecostal-Mennonite, Evangelical, Baptist, Adventist, independent/free churches, as well as the Latter-day Saints (Mormons) and Jehovah's Witnesses, which are often associated with them. The vision, application, and practice of worship in these assemblies and doctrines are sometimes highly heterogeneous; however, the majority adhere to the “six great principles” of Protestantism, and some are jointly members of the Protestant Federation of France. This section presents the groups in the city that fall into this category, dividing them into three groups based solely on numerical criteria within the agglomeration, using reliable sources or reasonable estimates: large structures (more than 100 active members), medium-sized (50 to 100), and small (fewer than 50).

=== Major structures ===
==== Besançon Pentecost ====
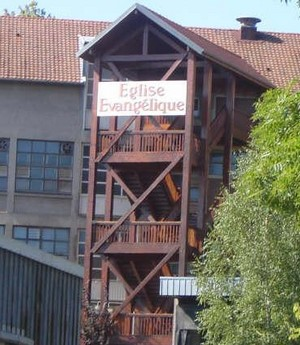
Headquarters of Besançon Pentecost on Rue Larmet.

The “Église évangélique missionnaire de Besançon” or “Besançon Pentecost” is a new religious movement founded locally in 1963 by Aldo Benzi and known for its missionary activity. The congregation, of Pentecostal and Mennonite obedience, maintains relations with the Protestant Federation of France. Two parliamentary reports (No. 2468 of 22 December and No. 1687 of June 1999) as well as several associations, including the C.C.M.M. (Roger Ikor Centre) and U.N.A.D.F.I., consider it as a “sect”. From its founding, it attracted the interest of both the community and church leaders, and its influence grew rapidly until the 1980s; it spread to many cities in France and had between 2,000 and 4,000 members in 2005, including 600 in Besançon, though growth stabilized from the 1990s. A sexual scandal broke in 2005 that implicated its leaders and ended global activities, although criminal proceedings did not result in convictions. The temples spread across the country dissociated, and membership declined from 2006. The Besançon church and many others in France remain active, though no longer linked to each other and having lost nearly all their initial dynamism. The Besançon assembly has approximately 400–500 members, of whom about 150 regularly attend Sunday worship.

==== Cépée Church ====
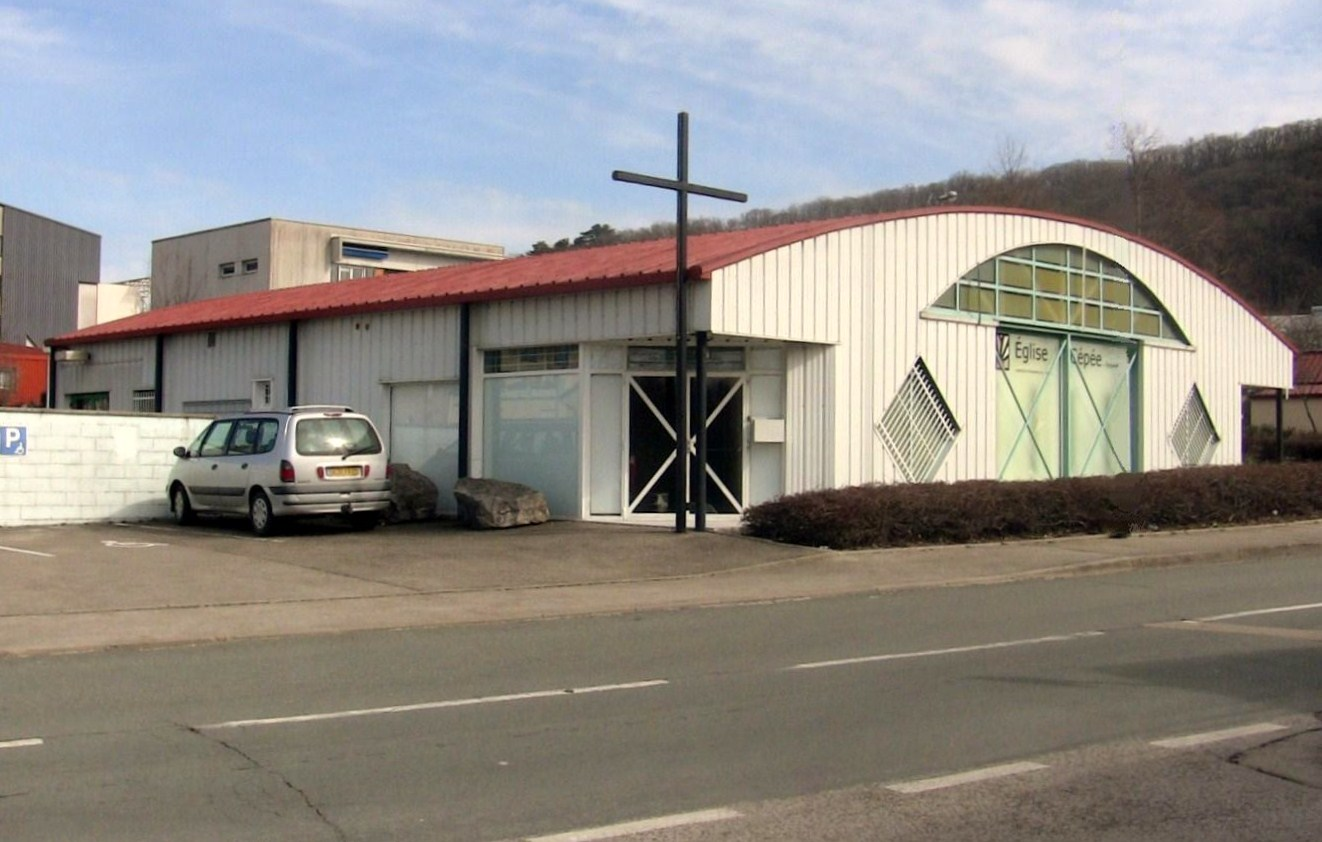
Cépée Church in Planoise.

The “Cépée Church” is an Evangelical Protestant movement that emerged in the 1970s. It began in 1973 on the campus of the Marie and Louis Pasteur University as the “Groupe biblique universitaire de Besançon,” founded by a student who wished to become involved after rediscovering the precepts of Christ. With about fifty members, mostly students, the aim was to create a dynamic community to revitalise this vision of faith within the Charismatic movement. Difficulties arose after several years, leading to dissolution in 1990. As members dispersed across Franche-Comté, about ten decided to continue and relaunch the project. In June 1991, former Reformed pastor Gaston Ramseyer offered his assistance. The first place of worship opened in La Barre in the Jura in September 1991. The following year, the association was registered at the sub-prefecture of Dole. The congregation was consecrated and joined the French pastoral unit. In 2000, the group acquired a temple in the heart of the Planoise district of Besançon. Officially recognised at the Préfecture of Doubs as a 1905-law religious association under the name “Communion d’Églises Protestantes Évangéliques” (CéPéE), it became a member of the National Council of Evangelicals in France in 2004 and the Protestant Federation of France in 2006. The structure now has a network of 17 sites across eight departments, and although precise attendance statistics are unavailable, it can reasonably be placed among the major structures.

=== Medium-sized structures ===
==== Latter-day Saints (Mormons) ====
The Church of Jesus Christ of Latter-day Saints, also known as Mormonism, is a Restorationist movement born in the United States in the mid-19th century. On 31 December, Besançon was designated a French city open to preaching, and in the early 1930s, missionaries from the Swiss district were sent to establish congregations. Although some implantation difficulties arose at the time, it was mainly World War II and the Nazi occupation that caused the group to leave the area en masse, returning only after the war in 1948. The local branch is officially constituted as an association, has a centre on Boulevard Diderot in Les Chaprais, and has approximately 150 members but about 50 active practitioners, of whom around fifteen hold the priesthood. In addition to services and worship activities, their main activities consist of a support and listening network and street proselytism. Sometimes judged to be a sect and criticised for reactionary tendencies, the local leadership insists on an open yet fervent vision.

==== Jehovah's Witnesses ====
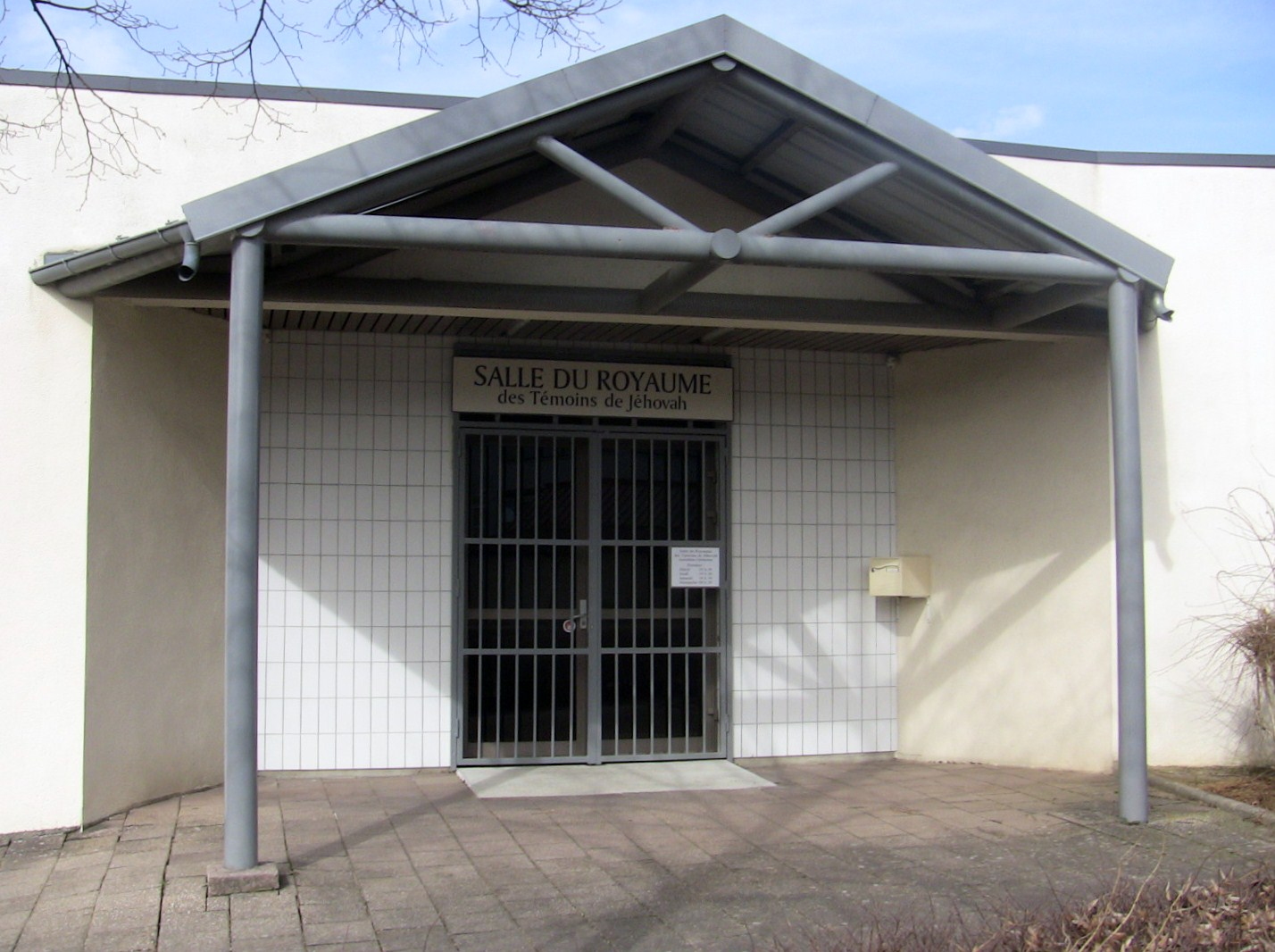
Kingdom Hall in Planoise.

Jehovah's Witnesses form another Restorationist movement, originating in the United States at the end of the 19th century. Their local branch was officialised in 1991, and they have had a place of worship (Kingdom Hall) on Rue Blaise-Pascal in Planoise since the early 2000s. Like other Renewal groups sometimes suspected of sectarianism, U.N.A.D.F.I. and several deputies have expressed concern about the church’s expansion, particularly in eastern France. The local branch and national leadership respond that accusations of drift are unfounded and lead to persecution. They number around 3,000 across the whole Franche-Comté region, with regular meetings and door-to-door evangelism.

=== Small structures ===
- Local branch of the Assemblies of God France (Pentecostalism): Rue de Belfort, Orchamps
- Local branch of the Assemblies of Brethren (Evangelicalism): Rue Chopard, Orchamps
- Local branch of Mission Timothée (Evangelicalism):Rue Georges-Cuvier, Grette
- Evangelical Baptist Church (Baptists): Part of the Foyer Évangélique Universitaire; Rue de Belfort, Orchamps
- La Bonne Nouvelle (Evangelicalism): Founded in 2003, 60 members claimed; Part of the Foyer Évangélique Universitaire; Rue Xavier-Marmier, Butte
- Independent Evangelical Protestant Church (Evangelicalism): Rue Charles-Fourier, city centre
- Seventh-day Adventist Church (Adventism): Branch formed in 1975; Rue de Trey, Montrapon-Fontaine-Écu
- Local branch of Vie et Lumière (Evangelicalism): Chemin des Vallières

== See also ==
- Christianity in Besançon
- Islam in Besançon
- History of the Jews in Besançon
- History of Besançon
- Timeline of Besançon

== Bibliography ==
- Düring, Ingar (1999). Quand Besançon se donne à lire: essais en anthropologie urbaine [When Besançon reveals itself: essays in urban anthropology] (in French). under the direction of Anne Raulin. Paris/Montréal: L'Harmattan. p. 223. ISBN 978-2-7384-7665-4.
- Chauve, Pierre; Blanchot, Jean-Michel; Brocard, Nicole; Brunet, Pascal; Calais, Yves; Debard, Jean-Marc; Delobette, Laurence; Delsalle, Paul; de Vregille, Bernage; et al. (vauthors) (2011). La vie religieuse à Besançon, du IIe siècle à 2010 [Religious life in Besançon, from the 2nd century to 2010] (in French). Besançon: Cahier de Renaissance du Vieux Besançon. p. 82.
- Tournier, Constant (1909). La Crise huguenote à Besançon au XVIème siècle [The Huguenot Crisis in Besançon in the 16th century] (in French). Besançon: imp. de Jacquin. p. 363. BnF 31486114
- Grizot, Abbé (1755). Lettre à un ministre protestant au sujet d'une abjuration par un prêtre du diocèse de Besançon [Letter to a Protestant minister concerning the abjuration of a priest from the diocese of Besançon] (in French). L'imprimerie de Cl. Jos. Daclin. p. 48.
