= Evangelical Church The Mission of Besançon =

Christian movement in Besançon, France

- Location: Besançon
- Country: France
- Denomination: Pentecostal

History
- Founded: 1963
- Founder: Aldo Benzi

The Evangelical Church The Mission of Besançon (French: Église évangélique La Mission de Besançon), formerly known as the Evangelical Pentecostal Church of Besançon and The Mission, is a Pentecostal church based in Besançon, France. It is affiliated with the Union of Missionary Churches.

The church was founded by Aldo Benzi, who converted to Christianity after being healed from a pleurisy. Subsequent leader René Kennel, a former Mennonite farmer who became pastor of the churches in Saint-Dizier and in Joinville after discovering Pentecostalism through an evangelical Roma mission, has directed the church since 1977. Its main beliefs (expressed in a creed of eight articles of faith) and practices are nearly identical with those of most Evangelical and Pentecostal groups, with a special focus on miraculous gifts of the Holy Spirit and proselytism. In the late 1990s the church was embroiled in many trials (often on the grounds of defamation or for financial issues), losing most of them. In 2006 a sex scandal within the church led the federation to be dissolved, and the church in Besançon became independent.

Since 1988 the church has been the subject of recurring public controversy; anti-cult associations and organizations (UNADFI, CCMM and MILS – then MIVILUDES), former members and the vast majority of media presented it as a dangerous group, mainly because of its intensive missionary activities and healing practices. The church was eventually listed as a cult in the 1995 and 1999 parliamentary reports established by the French National Assembly. Protestant and academic circles, however, disagreed with this assessment, considering the church to be a genuine Pentecostal group. The latter responded to criticism through a defensive strategy, which included outreach to sociologists and historians and better ties with mainstream religions, local and national institutions.

== History ==
The Church was founded by Pastor Aldo Benzi in 1963. Benzi was the church's president, followed by Nicole and then by René Kennel in 1977.

In 1975 he was appointed treasurer of the Federation of Free Evangelical Pentecostals, and elected president seven years later. Under Kennel's leadership of the Pentecostal Church of Besançon, the church quickly opened many places of worship in Northern and Eastern France; Kennel trained pastors among his converts (including his son Étienne, who was ordained in 1981), and sent them to direct the new assemblies. In 1989 Kennel legally registered the Evangelical Missionary Federation, whose purpose was to federate all the churches (then composed of over thirty pastors).

However, in 2005 Pastor Étienne Kennel was accused of adultery by church members, which resulted in his expulsion in January 2006. His father (considered guilty of covering up his son's actions) refused to retire, which led many believers to leave the church and pastors to vote for the federation's dissolution; this one was officially announced as defunct on 25 November 2006. 14 churches in the northwest, previously members of the FEM, are (as of 2011) gathered under the name Union of Missionary Churches (Union d'Églises Missionnaires, or UDEM), an association registered in Châlons-en-Champagne. Other places of worship are independent – including the church in Besançon, which was reregistered as an "Evangelical church" in late 2006.

In 2020, it was renamed “Evangelical Church The Mission of Besançon”.

== Beliefs ==
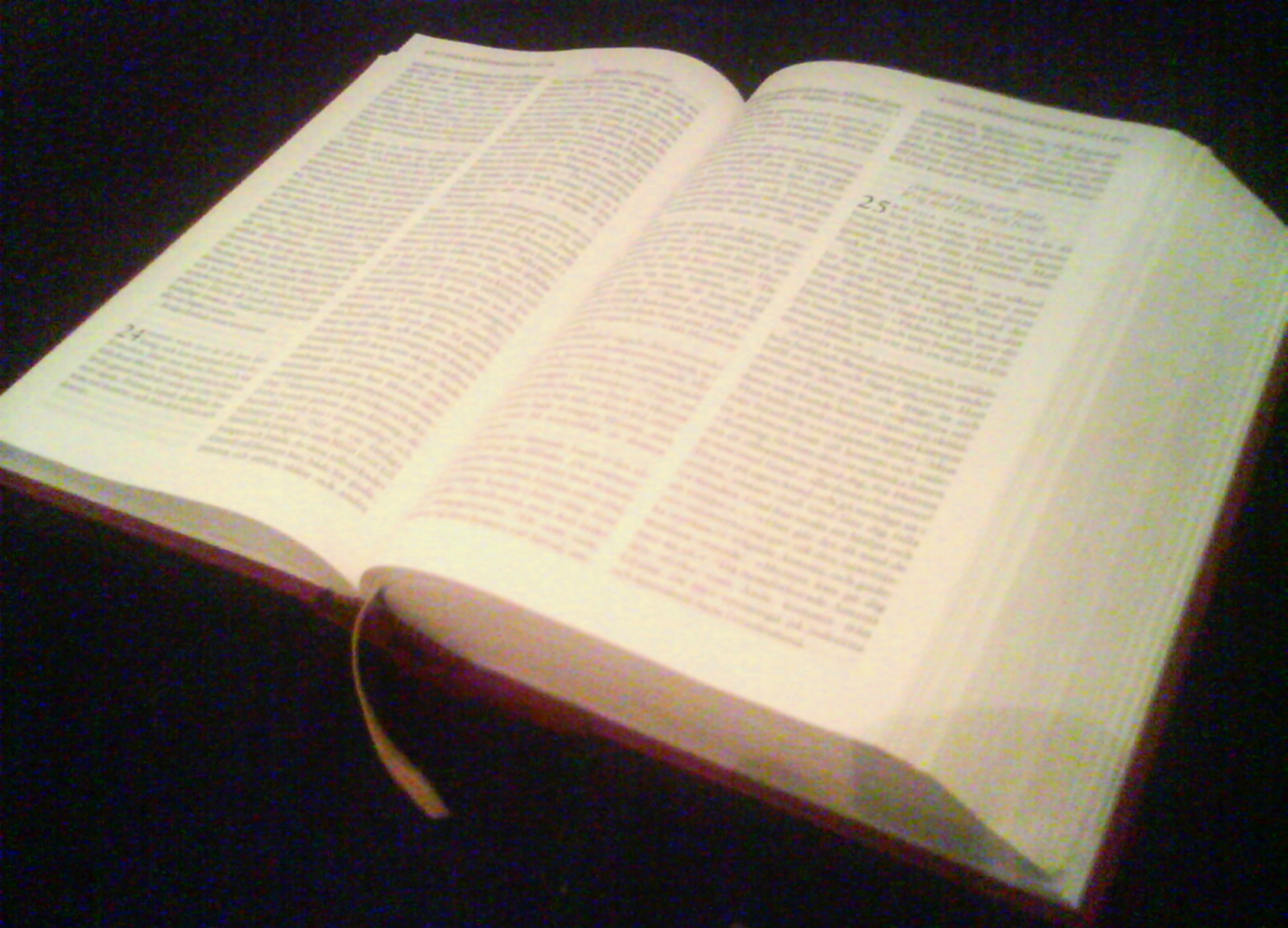
Like other Pentecostal assemblies, the Evangelical Missionary Church of Besançon considers the Bible as the Word of God and interprets it literally.

About his church Kennel said: "We are situated at the crossroads of the Pentecostal and Mennonite movements". Various explanations were provided by sociologists to define the place of the religious group within Christianity: Danièle Hervieu-Léger wrote that the church was created from "the meeting between a movement of evangelic sensibility inside the Reformed Church of Alsace and Lorraine, and a French Mennonite movement from the tradition of peaceful Anabaptism", Laurent Amiotte-Suchet considered that it "fits into the Assemblies of God", but also "in the history of a second wave of European Pentecostalism which experienced its revival in the 1970s and 1980s", and J. Gordon Melton described it, in his 2005 Encyclopedia of Protestantism, as one of the "newest Protestant groups". Evangelical Protestantism expert Sébastien Fath deemed the church a "non-Baptist" group, but "with some common characteristics" and explained that it professed a very high degree of religious activism, embracing conversionism, biblicism and crucicentrism. According to the Protestant Federation of France, the church displayed a "classical and structured Pentecostalism, with very little contact with other churches." The anti-cult association Centre contre les manipulations mentales said the church "comes from the classical Pentecostal movement which emerged in France in the 1950s and which now includes various groups".

The church's main beliefs are expressed in a creed, initially composed of twelve articles of faith based on biblical passages and adopted by the church. These beliefs are almost identical to the ones of most evangelical and Pentecostal groups, including biblical authority viewed as the Word of God, literal biblical interpretation and the Trinity, with a special focus on miraculous gifts of the Holy Spirit and proselytism. Later, the number of articles of faith were reduced to eight points, and Amiotte-Suchet noted that they were reworded in 1998 to become less explicit concerning issues that were the subject of public controversies. He also said that the pastors' sermons show an evolution linked to a generation gap; René Kennel continues to advocate healthy living, illustrating his speeches with stories of curses resulting from a non-Christian lifestyle, while his son placed more emphasis on "the discernment of spiritual gifts and the depth of faith". On its website the church defines itself as apolitical; it respects current principles of secularism and freedom of conscience, does not discourage medical treatment, encourages believers to participate in social life and does not claim exclusive salvation.

== Practices ==
Commit thy way to the Lord, and trust in him, and he will do it.

— Psalms 37:5, a verse highlighted on the church's website

The church has six weekly services, one of them located in the Rue Battant especially for people with disabilities. Each meeting is devoted to a particular Christian practice: evangelization, prayer, Bible reading, singing, and weekly worship. Meetings are composed of biblical sermons and studies, testimonies of religious experiences, hymns, meditation, worship, and prayers. Services are dynamic, charismatic and emotional, often evolving into ecstasy and trance; glossolalia results when the pastor calls the Holy Spirit to come upon the congregation, and usually lasts 30 to 60 minutes. Women must have their heads covered during worship.

Pastors established a record of public testimonies of every baptized member. Kennel's life is known by the faithful, and has an important place in the church. The pastor's break with his former religious affiliation, and his determined foundation of a new group despite many obstacles, are said to be directed by God's will; therefore, Kennel's spiritual course (which mixes "extraordinary and intransigence") is presented as an example to follow. As noted by Amiotte-Suchet, all testimonies (whose purpose is to strengthen the converts' faith) generally have a common thread; the former lifestyle of the faithful is almost always presented as "a story of an aimless wandering, covered with failures, disappointments and misfortunes" until God decides to manifest himself in the life of the future member. The future convert then demands a sign of God's reality, requires a variable length of time to strength his faith and experience the Holy Spirit, then engages fully in the church. Conversion is always said to lead to a healthier lifestyle and provide an expanded network of friends.

All members actively participate in evangelization, both personally (family, friends and professional associates) and with the church (door-to-door, proselytism under the big tent and on public squares, "mission weeks", which follow a tightly planned program). The church has denied practising proselytism among Christian people. However, after criticism of its methods the church became more discreet and avoided insisting publicly on miraculous healings, although it continued to highlight evangelization. In particular, it decided to stop proselytizing in hospitals, to discontinue loudspeakers in the streets, and to reduce the frequency of evangelization under the "big top".

The church features religious instruction for various ages, leads a choir and football team and celebrates the Holy Thursday Last Supper, believers' marriages and funerals. Baptism is practiced by immersion with the pastor's approval, and is reserved for people aged over 15 years. Fasting on two Sundays a month and between eight and ten conventions per year for each church are also scheduled. The church participates in social and humanitarian activities and organizes recreational days, including activities such as theater, library, trips, a clothing exchange and a paint shop.

== Organization and finances ==
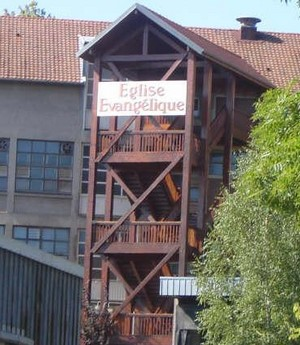
Church headquarters at 4 Rue Larmet, Besançon

The church headquarters in Besançon were first located in the Rue Battant, then in the Rue de Belfort, and eventually moved in 1994 to 4 Rue Larmet, in a building costing about four million francs. In 1999, the federation associated with SOS Hope (SOS Espérance, established in Vesoul to assist suffering people), an evangelical musical group, Flambo, and La Bergerie in Besançon for property management. The church owns a printing house that publishes writings for worship and evangelization, including a quarterly newsletter, The Concierge's Ear ("L'Oreille du concierge"), which has been published since 2000. In 2005 René Kennel was the president, Daniel Gloeckler vice-president and church spokesman, Étienne Kennel secretary and R. Cuenot the treasurer of the federation. Each year, a one-week course is organized in one of the churches belonging to the Evangelical Missionary Federation; named "Blessing School" ("École de la bénédiction"), this intensive Bible training consists of prayers, religious teachings and history, singing lessons, film screenings and debates.

In its organizational structure the church is similar to congregationalism, as the local assembly is autonomous. This form of congregationalism, however, is unique; the centralized organization gives to the Church of Besançon the role of head church, and the other assemblies of the federation are considered annex churches. Thus, Amiotte-Suchet opines that "the unifying spirit is much more coercive than the one in other Protestant groups". Decisions of the federation are made by all church pastors at monthly pastoral meetings. In the Church of Besançon, the leadership team attending the "brothers' meeting" is composed of René and Étienne Kennel, six appointed elders and men who have been members for a certain length of time.

The church has been criticized for its wealth, as monthly or quarterly donations were encouraged in the second article of the statutes of the Federation of Evangelical Missionary. According to the CCMM, property acquisition was evidence of significant income. The 1999 parliamentary report considered the church a "small cult" (a cult whose annual income is less than five million francs), which provided "relatively accurate information" to the Parliamentary Commission. The annual budget of the church was estimated between 2.4 and 3.1 million francs (the total of donations in 1998 and 1995 respectively), mainly from Sunday offerings, donations, loans, financial products and property income. In 1999, the commission estimated the church's property at about 15 million francs. As of 31 December 1998, the church's net active wealth (composed of real estate and stock) reached 7.3 million francs. Concerning its finances, the church said it applies five major principles: economy, recovery, devotion, voluntary work and solidarity. Money comes from Sunday collections, sometimes from personal loans and from donations intended for a particular use; there is no external financial support. Accounts are published at the annual general assembly of the church, by the financial commission of the Federation and by Social Security. Trainee pastors work outside the church; permanent pastors receive a low salary, and are affiliated with the Caisse d'assurance vieillesse, invalidité et maladie des cultes (CAVIMAC).

== Membership ==
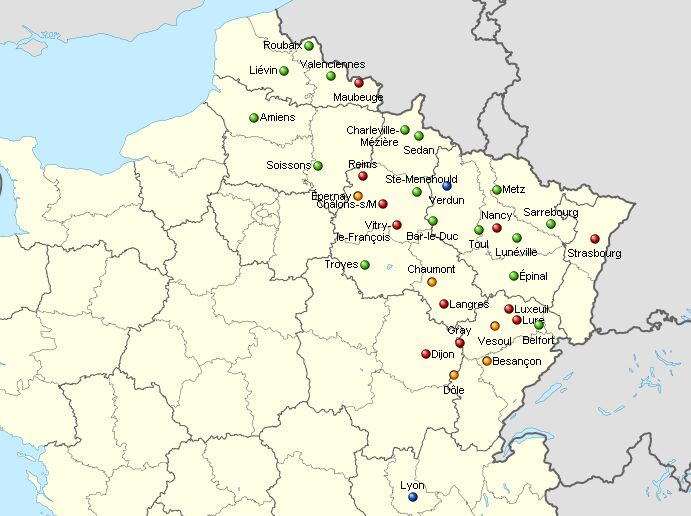
Location of churches belonging to the Evangelical Missionary Federation

Between 1977 and 1988, the Church of Besançon enjoyed significant growth, and Professor Grace Davie wrote that the whole religious movement had reached "the status of a small denomination" in the decades following its foundation. In 1983, there were 150 churchgoers in Besançon; in 1989, the number rose to between 400 and 600. In 1995, estimations of church membership by the Parliamentary Commission varied from 500 to 2,000 members. In 2000 the federation declared that 2,800 people regularly attend the Sunday service, including 600 in Besançon. In 2005 there were 4,000 members and 500 churchgoers at the Sunday worship in Besançon, according to Fath. In 2006, Amiotte-Suchet reported that the federation had 2,400 members and 37 pastors. He noted that criticism affected the church's growth; since 1988 the number of baptisms has fallen to about 50 a year, just enough to compensate for the number of people who leave the church. After the sex scandal in the founding church in 2006, attendance at the services in Besançon dropped to 70.

In 1989, there were 18 assemblies belonging to the Evangelical Missionary Federation. In 1995 the church (then widely established in several French regions) was called "a big regional cult that has now spread throughout eastern France" by the CCMM. The following year, the parliamentary report of the National Assembly listed 24 places of worship; the church stated the list was incomplete and incorrect as three places were missed, and eight belonged to other churches. Before it was dissolved in 2006, the federation counted 35 churches.

== Court cases ==
The Direction générale des impôts contested the religious status of the church and taxed its donations, saying "the association is devoted to proselytize. It has therefore not for exclusive purpose the celebration of a worship". As a result, a 600,000-franc tax-recovery notification was sent to the church on 20 December 1996, which rose to 2.6 million francs two years later (penalties included). This tax was considered a "tragic situation" by Human Rights Without Frontiers and "fiscal and administrative harassment" by sociologist Régis Dericquebourg. The church deemed this decision discriminatory and tried by all possible legal means to challenge it. On 31 January 2013, the Church and its president Éric Salaûn were awarded 387,722 euros by the European Court of Human Rights, which overturned the tax considered a "material injury" and sentenced France for violating the freedom of thought, conscience and religion on the basis of the 9th article of the European Convention of Human Rights.

On 29 September 1986, in a case related to custody of a six-year-old child, the Tribunal de Grande Instance de Besançon left the child with his father (who was not a member of the church) rather than with his mother (then a fervent member), stating that "people affiliated to [the church] submit their behavior of each time to the precepts of their beliefs, practice proselytism, and do not hesitate to involve some very young children in their meetings and religious practices".

In 1992, the CCMM was sued twice by the church on the grounds of defamation. A first complaint was filed on 4 February after a letter from CCMM in which the movement was labelled as a cult, with the following definition: "Groups whose activities have on others for result a notable mental manipulation of minds, a profound degradation of the human person, managing to make people lose all critical sense in locking them in intellectual ghettos." On 16 June 1993 the Court of Vesoul, and on 24 March 1994 the Court of Appeal of Besançon, sentenced the church to pay court costs and damages to the CCMM. In a second complaint filed on 27 November, the CCMM and the Centre Information Jeunesse in Haute-Saône were sued after distributing a publication critical of the church. Both complaints were dismissed. In 1996, the two appeals for cassation filed by the church were rejected; the court held that the CCMM's writings did not fall under defamation, said that damages to the church's honor were not proven, that "no reproach can be done when CCMM called 'cult' the Evangelical Church of Pentecost", and that the association "merely assesses the nature and trends of a religious community, reports some of its practices, including those relating to the disease healing and its methods of recruitment through agencies providing relief without indicating that they are the community's emanations".

On 30 September 1999, the Administrative Court of Besançon recognized the religious status of the church and granted it tax exemption on its place of worship. In a decision issued on 2 October 2003, the judge of the Administrative Court stated that the refusal by the prefect to grant donations and bequests to the church was not supported by evidence. In 2008, MIVILUDES President Jean-Michel Roulet said that complaints from the faithful against Kennel for physical abuse were dismissed.

== Reception ==
The French Parliamentary Commission on Cults included the church in the list of cults of the 1995 and 1999 parliamentary reports, based on reports by the Direction centrale des renseignements généraux that labelled the church as an "evangelical" and "healer" movement. Despite their similarities, other churches associated with the Evangelical Missionary Federation were not included in the list. The 1995 report said the group was among the "most active evangelical groups" and the Parliamentary Commission said they are "often motivated by genuine pastors who slid into the role of guru" and "always benefit from freedoms by Protestant official structures to prosper at their edge." However, the parliamentary reports and the list of cults had no legal status and were criticized by religious historians, sociologists and academics. In May 2007, a circular by Prime Minister Jean-Pierre Raffarin and a statement by MIVILUDES secretary Gilles Bottine, said the list of movements attached to the 1995 parliamentary report had become less relevant and no longer recommended its use.

Several anti-cult groups also considered the church a cult. The local branch of the Centre contre les manipulations mentales (CCMM, or Centre Roger Ikor) directed an intense campaign against the group with repeated warnings in the media, and the President of the Union nationale des associations de défense des familles et de l'individu (UNADFI), Catherine Picard, said on television that she considered the church a cult. Criticism against the Church includes methods of recruitment (considered aggressive proselytism) in psychiatric hospitals, schools, buses and similar environments directed to suffering people, a fundamentalist interpretation of the Bible, pressure on prospective members to quickly join the group, family breakdowns, identical language and clothing of followers reflecting a loss of individuality, education of children that is considered indoctrination, many banned activities (among them music, television, makeup and trousers for women who must also have long hair covered with a scarf), an hysterical environment at worship, desocialization of the faithful, excessive appeals for money, unverifiable and dubious healings that may be detrimental to members' health and the strong influence on members and lack of qualifications of Kennel. A delegate from the CCMM said that criticism was based on facts collected from former members and their families, some of which had been used in court (as in Vesoul). In response to writer in the Protestant journal Réforme Benoît Hervieu-Léger, who contended that a sole case in Besançon would have been sufficient to criticize the whole federation, the delegate also stated that complaints did not come exclusively from the church of Besançon. The association also noted many similarities with another Pentecostal church it considered a cult, the Mission of Full Gospel - Christian Open Door. As of 2010, MIVILUDES continued to monitor the Church of Besançon because of its hold over the faithful.

The media were generally critical of the church, presenting it as a cult. The first negative local press articles appeared in 1988, mentioning miraculous healings, proselytism, Kennel's status, fundamentalist beliefs as controversial issues, and included critical reports by former members. Fath noted that the vocabulary and arguments used in the media were intentionally slanted and the repetition of those developed by the CCMM, and that the disproportionate media coverage of the church did not facilitate an objective investigation. According to a study by an expert in new religious movements, Massimo Introvigne, when a former member destroyed furniture belonging to the church in Langres in July 1994, anti-cult associations and some news media took the former member's side, presenting him as the "victim" of a "cult". On the French talk show Ça se discute (broadcast on 25 May 2005 on France 2), a father (whose nine-year-old daughter was a member of the church with her mother) said his daughter was brainwashed; he criticized her proselytism at school, closed-mindedness and the role of women in the church. He explained that when he had suffered from cancer two years earlier, she had tried to miraculously heal him; however, she considered him a liar and a sinner because of his homosexuality. He said he found her diary, in which she spoke of her imminent death when she would reach heaven to meet her grandparents. The association for the defense of religious freedom and conscience, CICNS, criticized the talk show for its lack of alternative viewpoints.

== Response to criticism ==
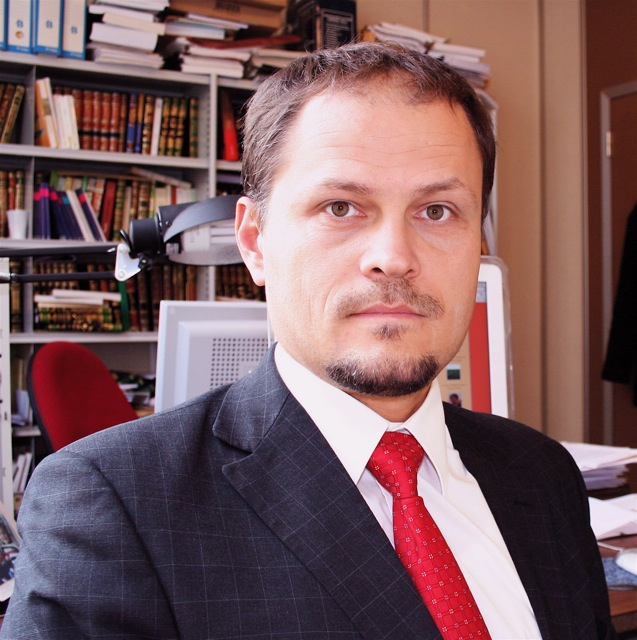
Sébastien Fath, expert on evangelical Protestantism, researched the Evangelical Pentecostal Church of Besançon.

Before 1988, the church was the subject of many neutral press articles and appeared "normal and respectable"; it contends that in the late 1980s Alain Vivien, then-leader of the CCMM, said to its representatives in Épernay that he did not consider it a cult. The church explained that the first criticism came from a Catholic vice-president of CCMM, who opposed the conversion to the Pentecostal church of his son-in-law and several seminarians (this explanation was later denied by the CCMM), by an educator hostile to the group, and by other evangelicals (including pastor and co-founder of the anti-cult group Vigi-sectes Gérard Dagon, a source for the 1995 parliamentary report who was critical of Pentecostal beliefs). The church also reported discriminations after the publication of the report (including refusals of building permits) and to have spent, over a period of ten years, €82,000 in legal fees to defend its interests.

Following the publication of the parliamentary report the church reacted by seeking help from academics and sociologists specializing in religious issues, including Jean Baubérot, Jean Séguy, Jean-Paul Willaime, Massimo Introvigne, Laurent Amiotte-Suchet, Bernard Blandre and Émile Poulat, who generally criticized its cult classification. Willaime and Poulat, among other sociologists, deemed the church's danger was never proven. Danièle Hervieu-Léger said the classification as a cult was an "absurd decision". Sébastien Fath considered the church "a bit radical but overall harmless", noting that this group had never been sued, and maintained that the church was criticized because of its proselytism and its rapid growth. Amiotte-Suchet deemed that the pastor's influence on the faithful was far from being as coercive as critics said. Poulat said, "We can debate whether it may be a 'sect' in the sense of Weber; it is certainly not a 'secte' [cult] in the popular and parliamentary sense of the term". Contacted by academics to participate in a documentary about the church, UNADFI and CCMM refused to explain their position. The Center for Studies on New Religions said the church's theology is "clearly mainline", but was criticized "because it does not belong to the World Council of Churches or other establishment church bodies".

The church established a dialogue with the Catholic Church and the Protestant Federation of France (FPF); the latter agreed to meet Daniel Gloeckler in Châlons-en-Champagne, and Étienne and René Kennel in Besançon. At first reluctant (since it did not want to serve as an "umbrella" against cult accusations), the FPF agreed to establish, at its meeting on 4–5 October 1997, a bilateral dialogue with the church and advised it to develop ecumenical ties; it publicly deplored the cult status of the church on 22 January 1998. Many Protestant figures and churches (including FPF president Jean-Arnold de Clermont, the Protestant Church of Augsburg Confession of Alsace and Lorraine and the Salvation Army) provided support, expressing a favorable opinion of the church.

The church also established ties with local and national institutions, such as administrative courts, municipalities and tax authorities. In 1996 it asked Alain Gest, a member of the French Parliamentary Commission on cults, the reason for its cult designation. In his response Gest did not provide details on the content of the work by the Direction centrale des renseignements généraux used for the report, but advised Kennel to ask the Observatoire interministériel sur les sectes for more information. On 4 June 1997 the church's representatives met the president of the Observatoire, prefect Antoine Guerrier de Dumast, who advised the movement to integrate the FPF to clarify the situation. The church also appealed to the European Center of Law and Justice, a Christian-oriented organization, to protect its freedom of religion and belief before the European Court of Human Rights.

== See also ==
- Christianity in France
- List of groups referred to as cults or sects in government documents
- New religious movement - accusations against the church are similar to the one against new religious movements, although theologically it is not a NRM
- Anti-cult movement
- Protestantism in Besançon
- Battle of Besançon
