= Temple of the Holy Spirit, Besançon =

Historic Protestant church in Besançon, France

Temple du Saint-Esprit
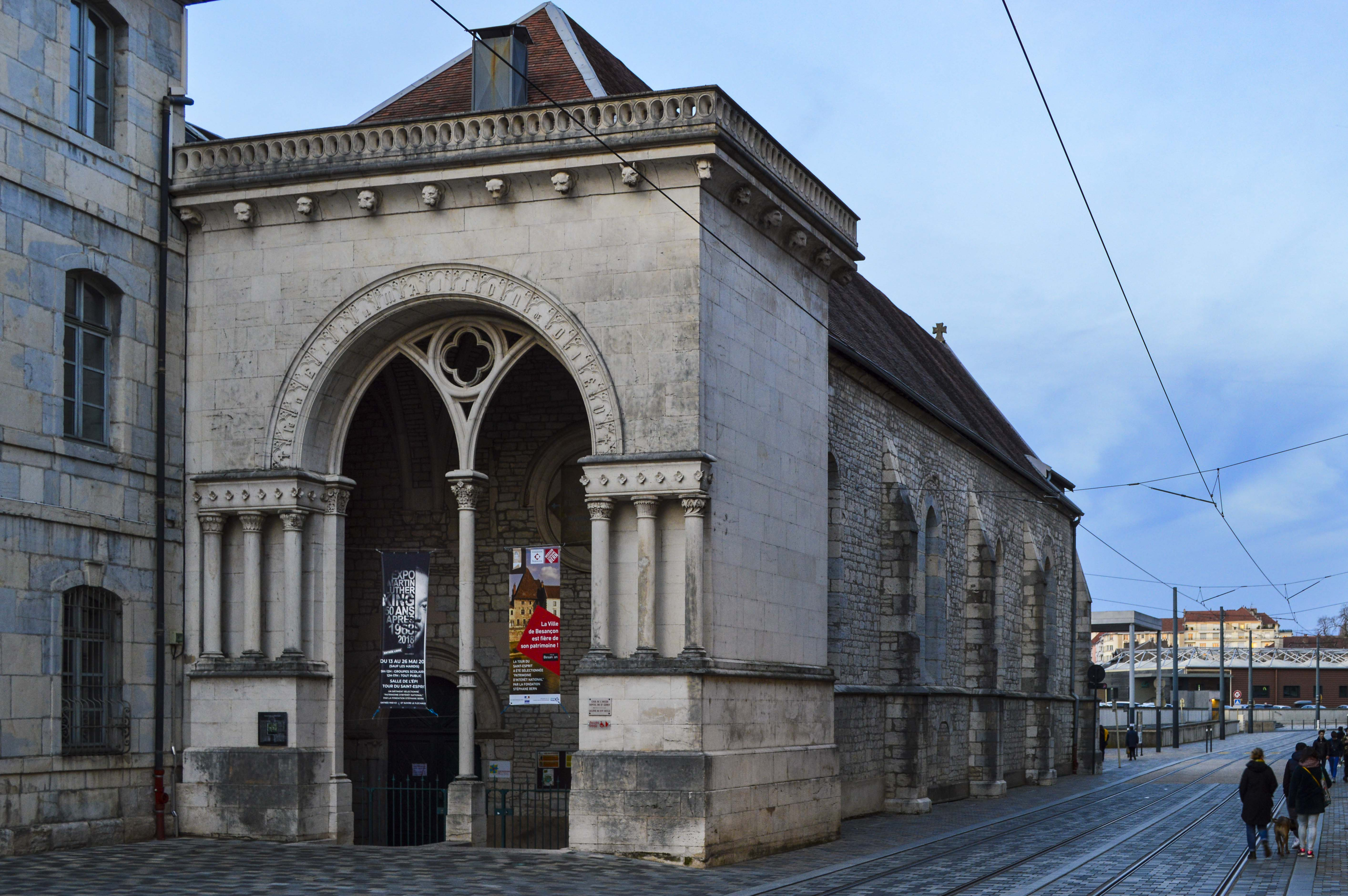
- General view of the building.
- Temple du Saint-Esprit
- 47.2406086°N 6.0231847°E
- Location: Besançon, Doubs
- Country: France
- Denomination: Protestantism

Architecture
- Style: Gothic, Troubadour, Neo-Romanesque

The Temple du Saint-Esprit (Temple of the Holy Spirit) is a protestant parish located in Besançon, Franche-Comté. The parish is a member of the United Protestant Church of France. The building and its outbuildings were constructed from the 13th century onward and were dedicated to caring for the sick and needy until the eve of the French Revolution. They were acquired in 1842 by the local Reformed community, which reappeared in 1792 after more than two hundred years of prohibition. The architecture and decoration, blending the original Gothic with the 19th-century Troubadour style and Neo-Romanesque, remarkable in their execution and refinement, were classified as a Historic Monument in 1932. Still open for services and visits, the site symbolizes, like the synagogue on Quai Veil-Picard, the longstanding and still vibrant presence of this religious minority.

== Context ==
=== The Reformation in Besançon ===
The history of the Temple is intimately linked to that of the Protestants. The Reformation appeared in Besançon informally in the 1530s, when famous preachers came to promote new ideas then in vogue among the population, despite their fervent Catholicism. Neighboring Montbéliard and Switzerland permanently converted, while its expansion in the Comtois capital led to incidents until the mid-16th century. In 1575, a major battle opposed Huguenots and Catholics, with the latter defeating the "heretics" who were killed and driven out. For nearly two centuries, all forms of dissent were severely repressed and Protestant authors forced into exile or conversion. This situation lasted until the French Revolution, which ended religious persecution, thus allowing the return of a Lutheran community. Institutionalization and significant Swiss immigration enabled the establishment of a solid congregation, which organized itself with a burial plot and in buildings that were certainly temporary but served for worship and social works. Nevertheless, it remained marginalized until the end of World War II, despite acquiring a proper temple and affiliation with an official structure.

Today estimated at approximately 2,000 to 2,500 people for Lutherans and several hundred for other branches (Pentecostals-Mennonites, Evangelicals, Baptists, Adventists, independents, Mormons, and Jehovah's Witnesses), Protestants today form a heterogeneous and vibrant group within the city. The site's openness, both sacred and secular, remains the best demonstration of this.

=== Protestant temples ===
The Reformed, while remaining Christians, adopted a new liturgy that diverged from and sometimes opposed Catholicism in many aspects of both belief and practice. This split naturally extended into services and places of worship, with temples now having a particular organization and framework. In the Kingdom of France during the Reformation, the first sermons were generally clandestine and thus confined to private homes or premises. However, given the growth in the number of faithful in certain cities, the need for actual buildings conforming to the new doctrine quickly became necessary. With tensions escalating into the French Wars of Religion, the problem was often radically resolved: in communes and territories where they had become the majority, Lutherans used churches for their own worship, as was the case in La Rochelle or Montbéliard; otherwise, they were forbidden, driven out, or repressed.

Subsequently, with the Revolution and their definitive normalization, they were often assigned former disused convents, civil or military buildings, or for the most dynamic and wealthy, the possibility of constructing new buildings. When the community had an edifice, it distinguished itself from traditional Catholic standards, particularly Gothic ones, by a centralized basilical plan, rectangular or amphitheatrical, sobriety in external appearance, and modernity and minimalism inside. Any space or element deemed superfluous was eliminated: the rood screen, naves, high altar, side chapels and altars, ciborium, tabernacle, baldachin, ambulatory, reliquaries, or visible demarcations such as statues and evocations of idols; only the pulpit occupied a decisive and central place, with other differences such as the importance given to stained glass windows and natural light, multiple doors, and galleries.

== History ==
=== The first places of worship ===
==== Refuge Chapel (1796–1804) ====
On 1 June 1794, a decree of the Committee of Public Safety was issued and confirmed by the law of 25 June 1795, granting all Swiss watchmakers who arrived in Besançon before 23 September 1795 compensation and French nationality, in addition to the free exercise of their worship. The majority of them were Reformed, and in this context the temporary transfer of the chapel to the "Protestant watchmaking artisans" belonging to the Catholic clergy was registered, with a precise inventory made on 1 November 1796. This detailed: "more than 200 small broken panes in the chapel windows and the roof where several tiles are missing and shutters at the hatches and dormers in fairly poor condition - ADD 63J29."

Pastor Ebray addressed a letter to Prefect de Bry on 22 November 1802, writing that: "for a long time his parishioners have planned to make the repairs to the temple they occupy that it needed when it was handed over to them [...] but as they are constantly told that it must be taken from them, they have not been able to undertake works requiring great expenses that would be lost to them if they did not have certainty of lasting enjoyment. This is why, citizen prefect, they ask you for an authentic declaration that removes all concern in this regard and guarantees them the use of said temple, or if this cannot be done, that you please order that repairs be made by the domain administration until it is definitively decided what premises the Protestants will occupy for the exercise of their worship."

The administration responded to the pastor that the loan was indeed temporary but that this did not prevent the duty of restoration of the place, which the community did by entrusting the work to architect C-A Colombot. But on 30 April 1804, referring to the council decree of 16 June 1801, the Hospices committee (the Saint-Jacques Hospital of Besançon) requested to take back the chapel while specifying that it wanted to find an arrangement to obtain new premises for the Reformed.

==== Capuchin Church (1804–1842) ====
On 24 June 1804, the Protestant community temporarily occupied the Capuchin church (in the current Faculty of Medicine and Pharmacy) while respecting the following measure: "provided that the citizens who profess this worship maintain said church with all necessary repairs both inside and outside, even the roof, as well as paying the taxes, if this building is subject to them" with an additional ordinance from the prefect: "in addition, the ten citizens must evacuate and make available without delay the church of the former refuge that had been ceded to them for the exercise of their worship and provide all repairs that may fall to their charge - ADD 63J29."

Locksmith work was undertaken at the Capuchins in February 1805 by the "Swiss citizens," and a pulpit was commissioned from sculptor Lapret. After the Austrian invasion on 4 January 1814, various churches were occupied, notably that of the Capuchins, to make it a fodder warehouse for the cavalry. The temple was therefore handed over to War Commissioner Thiébaud by the city's mayor, Baron Daclin, who offered in exchange the agricultural hall during the deprivation of the place of worship. The Protestants reinvested the site on 31 March 1814, but from 1817 Catholic authorities considered taking back the convent. After Parisian authorities qualified the local project as "contrary to the Government's wishes and the laws," it was finally abandoned.

The community ordered a nine-stop organ from the Callinet brothers of Rouffach on 18 September 1836; priced at 3,500 francs, it was intended for the temple's gallery and inaugurated on Easter day on 26 March 1837 by Ch. Rialpo.

==== Various projects (1826) ====
The Capuchin convent came into question starting in January 1826, with the army wishing to appropriate it to make an arsenal. The prefect of Doubs and Count de Milo wrote to the mayor informing him that "the rotunda of the former ladies of Battant, the most suitable building for the exercise of (Protestant) worship, is still available for lease currently," suggesting to the mayor not to "miss the opportunity that presents itself to secure the enjoyment of premises as he would find it difficult to find the equivalent later."

This 18th-century building had become national property during the Revolution and was resold in 1793 to Monsieur Fachard. The owner indicated to the mayor in a letter dated 11 March 1826: "no provision to cede the chapel for less than 55,000 francs and that in case of lease, no responsibility on his account for interior repairs or windows that this place might require for the exercise of Protestant worship."

Architect Pierre Marnotte, creator of the prestigious Besançon Synagogue, mentioned in his memoirs the possible construction of a new temple: "it was already a question in 1826 of establishing in Besançon a construction arsenal and abandoning the Capuchin building to the artillery; consequently the Protestant temple. I would therefore present a plan for the reconstruction of this temple on the site of the old Holy Spirit church facing Rue de l'Abreuvoir. The building should be semicircular, surrounded by an interior colonnade supporting a gallery. I had adopted this form in preference to any other because it seems more suitable for this type of building intended particularly for preaching and where attendees have their eyes fixed on the central point where the minister is located. The wings of the building should house classrooms for both sexes; but the delays that occurred in the execution of the arsenal project led to the abandonment of the plan I had presented."

==== Transfer to the current temple (1839–1842) ====
The State finally appropriated the Capuchin temple for the army in August 1839. Alphonse Delacroix was then charged with obtaining and restoring the old Holy Spirit hospice so that it would be suitable for Protestant worship. He explained: "the city does not possess any free land suitable for receiving a new construction and no old building that could be restored for the foundation of a temple, except the old Holy Spirit church. The space is sufficient, the character of the architecture is in harmony with the destination. The repairs to be made would be numerous but we would have in some way recreated a building precious for its age and given Protestant worship a very complete temple, but no major reconstruction would take place except that of the porch which is currently in ruins."

The municipal council decided on 14 August 1839 to follow Delacroix's recommendations, convinced by him and architect Jean-Agathe Micaud.

=== The building from its origins to the Revolution ===
The Holy Spirit Hospital was founded in Besançon at the beginning of the 13th century by the Hospitaller Order of the Holy Spirit, probably between 1207 and 1220 by Jean de Montferrand. The chapel dates from the 15th century, and the portal was added in 1841. The presence of the Hospitaller Order in the building is particularly visible through an engraved tombstone, which was erected at the death of rector Pierre de Navarret in 1414.

The hospital welcomed throughout the Middle Ages the sick, pregnant women, the elderly, travelers, and orphans. However, the hospice limited its aid to orphans, pregnant women, and travelers from the 16th century after agreements with the municipality of Besançon. The Hospitaller Order of the Holy Spirit was suppressed in 1777 by Cardinal de Choiseul, and all the property of this congregation became property of the city, including the building.

In 1792, the building took the name of hospice of children of the fatherland before being transferred in 1797 to the recently constructed Saint-Jacques Hospital in Besançon, which was to be the city's central hospital. In 1796, soldiers and officers residing in the city managed to force the commune to provide them with a place of worship, and the Chapel of Notre-Dame-du-Refuge was officially assigned to Protestants until 1804. On this occasion, a first pastor appeared in the city in 1803, Jean Ebray, and the community was actually established. But the church moved to the former Capuchin convent on 6 January 1805, with Saint-Jacques Hospital claiming the chapel.

Then it was forced once again to move elsewhere because of the construction of the arsenal, celebrated a last service on 24 April 1842, and settled in the old Holy Spirit church, which the faithful acquired the same year after restoration by the city. Meanwhile, in 1824, the organization of the Reformed Church of Besançon was officially created.

=== From consecration to the present day ===
In 1842, the building was officially ceded to the city's Protestants, while on 28 April of the same year the dedication took place. The building seems to play a central role in the community's demographic growth: in 1856, registers recorded 90 baptisms and 33 marriages, including 21 mixed marriages, for 76 deaths.

In the context of the separation of Church and State in France, an inventory was made at this temple on 29 January 1906 in the presence of pastor Cadix, then president of the presbyteral council, two other pastors, and treasurers of the diaconate, who submitted to it and offered no resistance.

In 1975, the Reformed Church became owner of the so-called Square Holy Spirit tower adjacent to the chapel of the old hospital, built from 1447 to 1450 on an older 13th-century building by Brother Lambert Vernier de Vélesme. The 16th-century façade located on the west side of the small courtyard adjacent to the old Holy Spirit church has been classified as a historic monument since 22 April 1932.

== Architecture ==
=== General features and modifications ===
The building, apparently constructed from 1207 to 1220, is Gothic in style. The choir was enlarged in the 1300s. Three chapels were added on the west flank: in 1318 the Saint-Denis chapel (disappeared); in 1361 the Saint-Jacques chapel (disappeared); then in 1480 the Notre-Dame de la Gésine chapel (current sacristy), as well as a bell tower destroyed during the French Revolution. Alphonse Delacroix equipped the building with a new Neo-Gothic porch in the Troubadour style in 1841.

The church's nave, vaulted with wide and low ribbed vaults with narrow windows, is marked by the dominant Cistercian influence in the region, as is the entire Neo-Romanesque decoration of the porch and capitals. The Holy Spirit tower (historic monument) adjacent to the chapel of the old hospital, built between 1447 and 1450 by Brother Lambelet Vernier de Vélesme (rector of the hospital from 1427 to 1476), on a first floor from the 13th century, is one of the city's oldest buildings, remarkable for its framework and its hexagonal spiral staircase executed by an anonymous artist.

=== Decoration, furnishings, and internal appearance ===
The wooden gallery (historic monument) in the courtyard is remarkable for its sculpted decoration. Its decoration is clearly influenced by the Middle Ages, as suggested by sculptures of monsters swallowing the ends of beams. However, it is indisputable that these sculptures date from the 16th century, with engravings of cherubs, garlands, vases, and allegorical and mythological figures proving that these works originate from the Renaissance – this is still debated by specialists, with historical documents favoring a construction date before 1476 under the mandate of Lambelet Vernier. Of the 10 small columns originally present, only four remain; the balustrade and the mermaid column date from an unfortunate restoration in the 1950s.

Buildings constructed by architects Jean-Pierre Galezot and Jean-Charles Colombot for the Holy Spirit are located near the edifice, at number three Rue Goudimel and are currently occupied by the presidency of the University of Franche-Comté. One can see a main building dating from 1740, featuring a stone staircase with pendant keystones and wrought iron railings.

Another masterpiece is located near these buildings: a portal opening onto the courtyard, adorned with a sculpted allegory representing charity in the form of a mother accompanied by her children, sculpted by artist Perrette. On the base of this sculpture is engraved Psalm 26: "If my father and mother abandon me, Yahweh will take me in."

This building replaced several medieval buildings including the large hall for the sick built by Rector Lambelet-Vernier, weakened by a fire in 1599. It housed the orphanage of the Holy Spirit hospital until 1797. From 1842 to 1885, the north wing of this building housed classrooms for Protestant children (2 girls' classes and 2 boys' classes) of a mixed bi-denominational Jewish and Protestant primary school. The classrooms for Jewish girls and boys were located in the adjacent Holy Spirit tower, as well as the director's lodging.

The organ by the Callinet brothers, builders in Rouffach (Alsace), dates from 18 March 1837. It has seven keyboard stops and two pedal stops. Its tin pipes and original case justified its instrumental classification as a historic monument in 1972.

== Sociological and ritual data ==
=== Liturgy ===
Reformed Christians adhere specifically to the "six fundamental principles" of Protestantism, which define their vision and application of the faith. These principles prioritize the unique authority of the Bible guided by the role of the Holy Spirit.

In contrast to Catholicism, the Reformed tradition rejects several key doctrines and practices, including:

- The authority of sacred Tradition.
- Five of the seven sacraments (including confession).
- The hierarchical superiority of the pastor and the authority of the Pope.
- Belief in transubstantiation, the Immaculate Conception, and the intercession of saints.
- The existence of purgatory, the process of canonization, and the granting of indulgences.
- Ritual practices such as the sign of the cross and the use of holy water.

== See also ==
- United Protestant Church of France
- Huguenots
- Edict of Versailles
- Order of the Holy Ghost
- Troubadour style
- History of Besançon
- Timeline of Besançon
- Protestantism in France

== Bibliography ==
- Tank-Stroper, Sébastien (1999). "En quête d'une identité juive". In Raulin, Anne (ed.). Quand Besançon se donne à lire : essais en anthropologie urbaine [When Besançon presents itself for reading: essays in urban anthropology] (in French). Paris/Montréal: Éditions L'Harmattan. p. 223. ISBN 978-2-7384-7665-4.
