= Champs-Bruley cemetery =

Cemetery in Doubs, France

Coordinates: 47.24796°N 6.03976°E

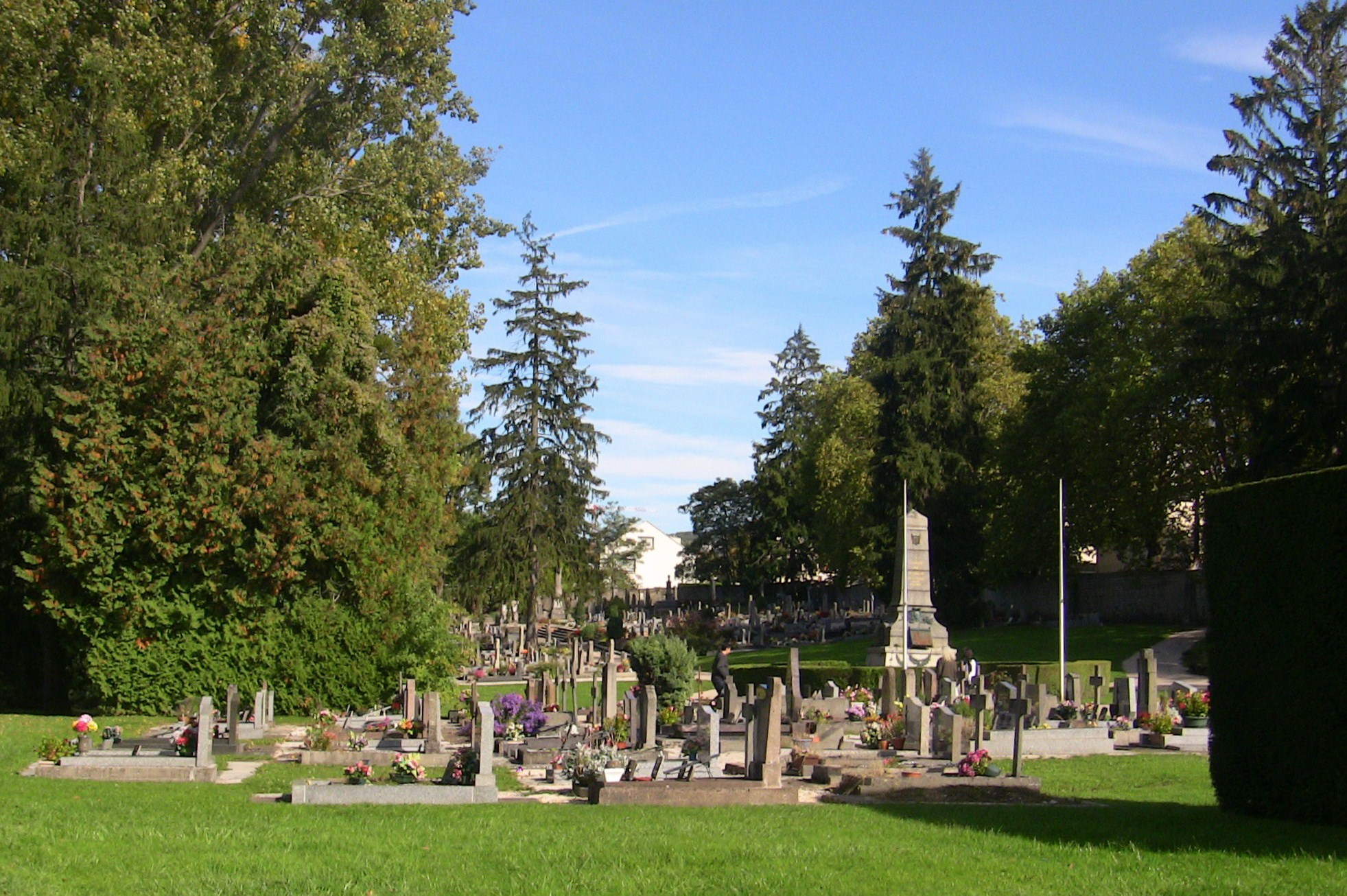
The cemetery in 2010.

The Champs Bruley cemetery is a municipal cemetery located in Besançon (France) between the Chaprais, Bregille, Clairs-Soleis, and Vaîtes districts. Opened in 1793 and still active as of 2019, it is the oldest burial ground managed by the city.

The cemetery, when constructed, was intended for use by any inhabitant of the area. Because it did not have a nearby Catholic church, and also because the site has an uneven topography and was viewed at the time as being isolated, the predominantly Catholic Bisontin community did not use it. This led to it being viewed as a burial ground for "undesirable citizens": the sick, condemned prisoners, and non-Catholics.

Over time, it was seen as a de facto Lutheran-only burial ground and, in 1824, was officially designated a Lutheran cemetery, following the construction of the Chaprais Cemetery. It became the official cemetery for parish burials until the neutrality laws of 1881. Although it is now legally available to people of all religions, the Champs Bruley remains a predominantly Lutheran cemetery.

== See also ==
- Protestantism in Besançon
- Jewish cemetery of Besançon
