= Saint-Claude (Besançon) =

Neighborhood of Besançon, France

Coordinates: 47°15′25″N 6°00′47″E

Saint-Claude (French pronunciation: [sɛ̃ klod]) is a large district of the east of Besançon.

== History ==
In 1965, was built the "City of Montarmots" in Saint-Claude, who has more than 30 dwellings. The primary purpose of these units was to host the Franco-Algerian rappatriés recently (since the Algerian War)

== Geography ==
The area is located to the east of Besançon, near Orchamps, Fontaine-écu and Chaprais.

== Enseignement ==
Kindergarten

- Albert Camus kindergarten
- Kindergarten of Bruyères
- Kindergarten of Fontaine-Écu
- Kindergarten of Saint-Claude
- Viotte kindergarten
- École maternelle privée Saint-Bernard et Sainte-Marthe

Écoles primaires

- Public Primary School of Bruyères
- Public Primary School of Fontaine-Écu
- Public Primary School of Saint-Claude
- Public Primary School of Viotte
- Private Primary School of Saint-Bernard and Sainte-Marthe

Colleges and lyceum

- Collège of Albert Camus
- Private lyceum of Saint-Jean

== Sports and Cultural Facilities ==
- Sports Complex of Saint Claude

== Place of worship ==
- The great mosque of Besançon
- Church of Saint Claude

== Monuments ==
- Cemetery of St. Claude
- Fort of justices

== Other buildings ==
- Funérarium-crématorium

== Transports ==
- The line 2 and 22 serves the area

== See also ==
- Besançon
