= Fort of Justices =

- Montrapon-Fontaine-Écu, Besançon, Franche-Comté in France
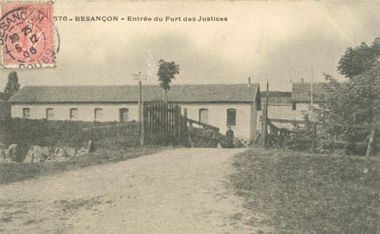
- The entrance to the fort on a postcard

Site information
- Condition: Demolished

Location
- Location within France
- Coordinates: 47°15′17″N 6°00′30″E

Site history
- Built: 1860s—1870s
- Fate: Demolished

The Fort of Justices (officially Fort Pajol, French: Fort des Justices) was built in the 1860s or early 1870s located in Montrapon-Fontaine-Écu, Besançon, Franche-Comté. It was constructed for use in the Franco-Prussian War to stop the Prussian forces from invading from Vesoul, but was never used in battle and was abandoned. It was later demolished in the 1980s.

In the 1800s, the French government decided to construct defences as there was a possible war with Germany. The defence of Besançon had hardly changed since the guidance of Sébastien Le Prestre de Vauban which had provided the city with its citadel, but it was agreed that new fortifications were essential. At least 25 forts were constructed within 50 km (31 mi) of Besançon.

The exact date of construction is unknown, but it is believed to have been in the 1860s or early 1870s. The construction of the fort was not subject to strategic research, and was the reaction of a possible attack from Germany, explaining the simplicity of the buildings. None of the forts around Besançon were used in the Franco-Prussian War, and the building was abandoned after the war. Pierre Claude Pajol was responsible for the location of the fort, and it was designed to flank the Fort of Montboucons. The Fort of Justices was not used in World War One as Besançon was not involved in the conflict, and there is no evidence of it being used in World War Two.

The site is believed to have been abandoned just after the First World War, the fort's current location is occupied by the offices of the National Gendarmerie for Franche-Comté, and the fort was demolished in the mid-1980s. The fort measured 350 by 120 metres (1,150 by 390 ft), artillery was positioned on the front and smallest sides of the fort, and it was designed so the central buildings were protected from attack.
