= Edict of Versailles =

1787 French edict of religious tolerance

- Territorial extent: France
- Signed by: Louis XVI
- Signed: 7 November 1787
- Effective: 29 January 1788 (Paris); 5 March 1788 (Grenoble); 27 January 1788 (Alsace)

Keywords
- Freedom of religion in France

Text of statute as originally enacted

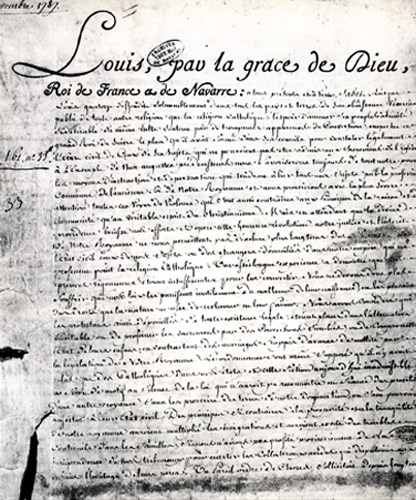
Edict of Versailles signed by Louis XVI in 1787, Archives nationales de France

The Edict of Versailles, also known as the Edict of Tolerance, was an official act that gave non-Catholics in France the access to civil rights formerly denied to them, which included the right to contract marriages without having to convert to the Catholic faith, but it denied them political rights and public worship. The edict was signed by King Louis XVI on 7 November 1787, and registered in the Parlement of Paris during the Ancien Régime on 29 January 1788.

Its successful enactment was caused by persuasive arguments by prominent French philosophers and literary personalities of the day, including Anne-Robert-Jacques Turgot; Étienne François, duc de Choiseul, Americans such as Benjamin Franklin and especially the joint work of Guillaume-Chrétien de Lamoignon de Malesherbes, minister to Louis XVI, and Jean-Paul Rabaut Saint-Étienne, spokesman for the Protestant community in France.

King Henry IV had granted Huguenots significant amount of freedom to practice their faith when he announced the Edict of Nantes on 13 April 1598. Those rights were revoked by Louis XIV during the Edict of Fontainebleau (18 October 1685). Enforcement of the revocation relaxed under the reign of Louis XV, but the revocation remained law for a century.

Under the Edict of Versailles, Roman Catholicism continued as the state religion of the Kingdom of France, but relief was offered to non-Catholic worshippers: Calvinist Huguenots, Lutherans and Jews alike. Considering the long-standing dominance of the state religion, restrictions were still placed on non-Catholics around the country. The time's outliers were kept behind the scenes at the workplace and in educational settings to avoid misrepresenting the kingdom.

The most notable example restriction was in Metz, whose Parlement's actions explicitly excluded certain rights for Jews within its domain, such as drafting of lists of grievances, unlike in the rest of France.

The Edict of Versailles did not proclaim freedom of religion across France, which would occur only by the Declaration of the Rights of Man and Citizen of 1789, but was an important step in pacifying religious tensions and officially ended religious persecution in France.

== See also ==
- Edict of toleration
- French Wars of Religion
- Persecution of Huguenots under Louis XV
- Religions in France
- Temple of the Holy Spirit, Besançon
