= Vaites =

French district located in Besançon

Coordinates: 47°15′08″N 6°02′15″E

Vaites or The Vaites is a district of Besançon, located to the northeast of the city.
