= Sébastien Fath =

French historian

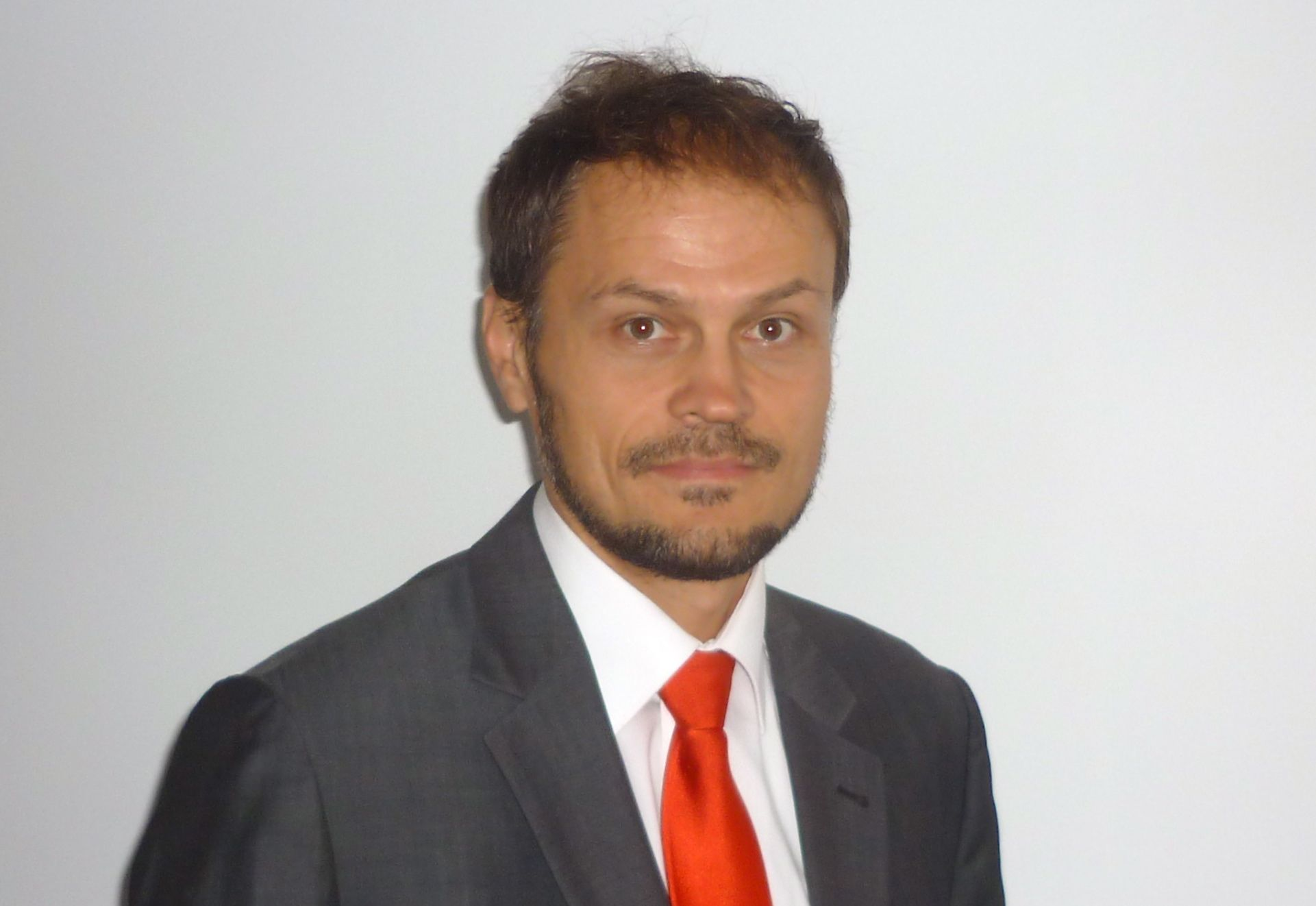
Sébastien Fath (CNRS)

Sébastien Fath (born 1968 in Strasbourg) is a French professional historian and a Ph.D. at the Sorbonne University. Also trained in Sociology, he is the main French specialist in the study of Evangelical Protestantism. Author of sixteen books, he is a permanent researcher at the National Center for Scientific Research (CNRS). He is a full member of the GSRL (Groupe Sociétés Religions Laïcités), a research team working on religion and secularism. As a social scientist and a citizen, he focuses on cross-cultural reflexion on Civil Society, Politics and Religion.

== Career ==
He is working in a twofold direction since 2009. First, relationships between evangelicalism, immigration, interculturality and urban space. This includes studying the cultural reshaping of congregations in Paris through the impact of immigration, the new types of Gospel music produced between Africa and Europe, and the new Protestant landscape as it is impacted by demographic changes. The second direction is Geopolitics and Evangelicalism.

== Bibliography ==
=== Books ===
- Fascicule de méthodologie d'histoire et sociologie des religions à l'époque contemporaine. Appliqué au protestantisme, Paris, EPHE, 1997 (110p)
- L'Iran et de Gaulle. Chronique d'un rêve inachevé, Paris, ed. Eurorient, 1999
- Une autre manière d'être chrétien en France. Socio-histoire de l'implantation baptiste (1810-1950), Genève, Labor et Fides, 2001
- Les baptistes en France (1810-1950), Faits, dates et documents, Excelsis, Charols, 2002
- Billy Graham, pape protestant ?, Paris, Albin Michel, 2002
- Les protestants, Paris, le Cavalier bleu, 2003
- La diversité évangélique (ed.), Excelsis, Charols, 2003
- Dieu bénisse l'Amérique, la religion de la Maison Blanche, Paris, Seuil, 2004
- Militants de la Bible aux États-Unis, Évangéliques et fondamentalistes du Sud, Paris, Autrement, 2004
- Le protestantisme évangélique, un christianisme de conversion (ed.), Turnhout, Brépols, 2004
- Du ghetto au réseau, les protestants évangéliques en France de 1800 à 2005, Genève, Labor et Fides, 2005
- Dieu XXL, la révolution des megachurches, Paris, Autrement, 2008
- Protestantisme évangélique et valeurs (ed.), Excelsis, Charols, 2010
- Dieu change en ville. Religion, espace, immigration (ed., with Lucine Endelstein and Séverine Mathieu), Paris, L'Harmattan, 2010
- La nouvelle France protestante (ed., with Jean-Paul Willaime), Geneva, Labor & Fides, 2011 (from a 2010 Conference in Paris, with 22 contributors)
- Les fils de la Réforme, idées reçues sur les protestants, Paris, Cavalier Bleu, 2012
- Les nouveaux christianismes en Afrique (ed., with Cédric Mayrargue), Paris, AFRIQUE CONTEMPORAINE review, n°252, 2015
- Gospel et Francophonie, une alliance sans frontières, Tharaux, Empreinte Temps Présent, 2016

=== Publications in English ===
- 2003. "A forgotten missionary link between France and Britain: the role of the Baptist Continental Society in France between 1831 and 1836", London Baptist Quarterly, vol. 40, July, 2003 : 133–151
- 2005. "Evangelical Protestantism in France : an example of Denominational Recomposition?", Sociology of Religion, 2005, vol.66/4 : 399–418
- 2006. "The Impact of Charismatic Christianity on Traditional Baptist Identity", in Ian M. Randall, Toivo Pilli and Anthony Cross, Baptist Identities, International Studies from the Seventeenth to the Twentieth Centuries, London, Paternoster Press: 77–91
- 2007. "American Civil Religion and George W. Bush Jr.", in Mark Noll and Luke Harlow (ed), Religion and American Politics From the Colonial Period to the Present, Oxford, New York, Oxford University Press, Second edition : 393–400
- 2007. "Putting God into the City : Protestants in France", in Alec G. Hargreaves (ed), Politics and Religion in France and the United States, Lanham, Lexington Books : 49–62
- 2008. « Empire's future religion : the hidden competition between postmillennial American expansionism and premillennial Evangelical Christianity », in Peter Hetzel et Ellis Benson (ed), Evangelicalism and Empire, Brazos Press : 120 -129
- 2011. "The other American Dream: French Baptists and Canada in the 19th and 20th Century", in Jason Zuidema (ed.), French-Speaking Protestants in Canada, Historical Essays, Leiden, Brill, 2011 : 243–263
