= Montrapon =

Coordinates: 47.2519°N 6.0121°E

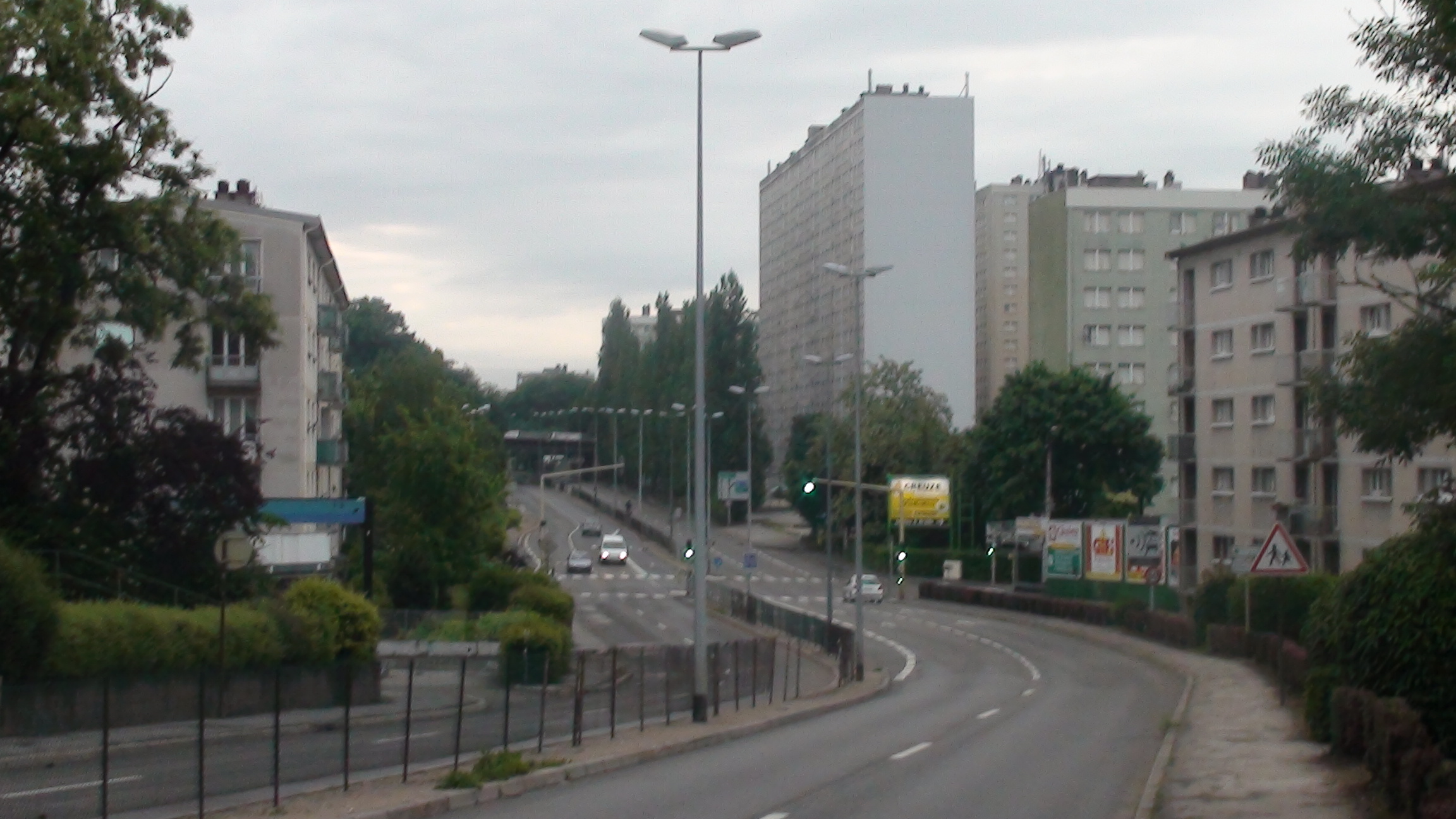
Winston Churchill street, and building of Montrapon-Fontaine-Écu

Montrapon, with Fontaine-Écu are two sectors forming an area located in the north of Besançon (France). In 1990, they counted approximately 10,000 inhabitants.

The Fort of Justices was located in this area.
