= Alphonse Delacroix =

French architect and archaeologist (1807–1878)

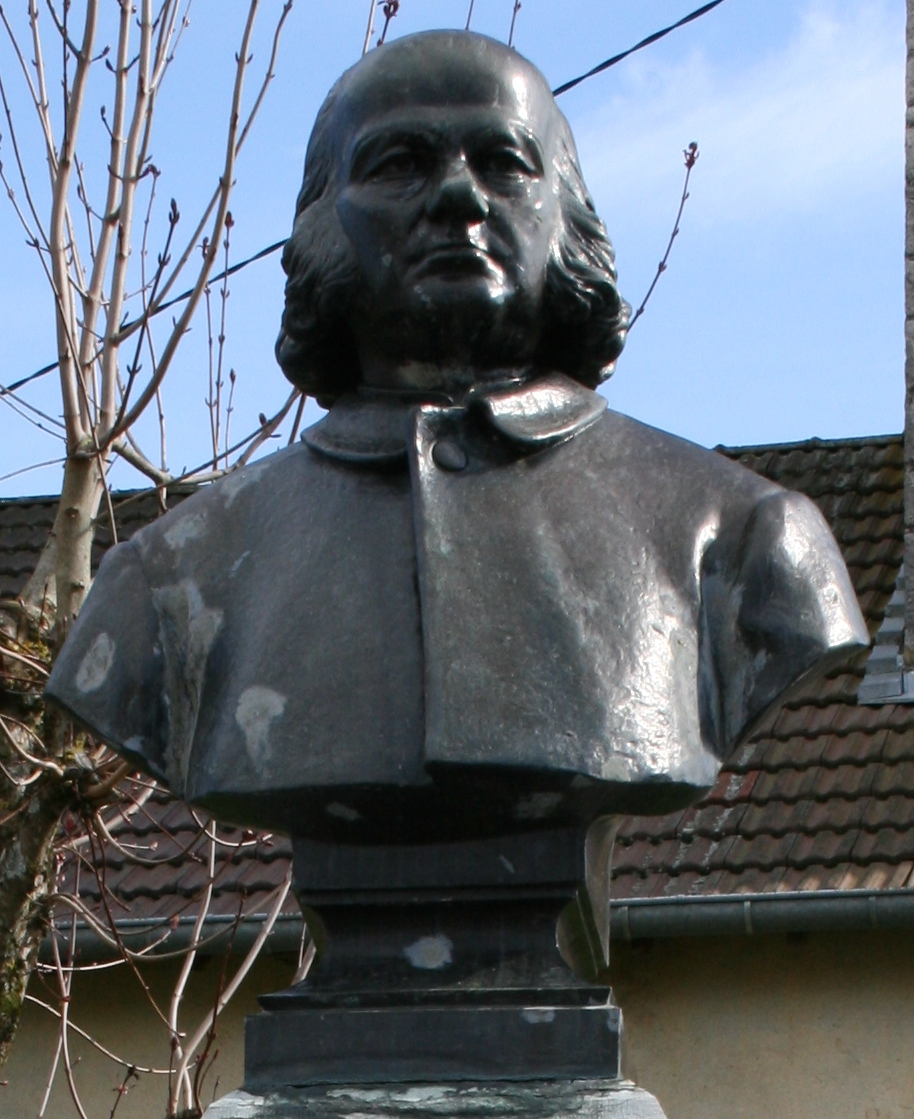
Bust of Alphonse Delacroix in Alaise, by his grandson Alphonse Voisin-Delacroix.

Alphonse Delacroix (January 10, 1807 – January 7, 1878) was a French architect and archaeologist.
