= Chaprais-Cras =

District of Besançon, France

Coordinates: 47°14′51″N 6°01′43″E

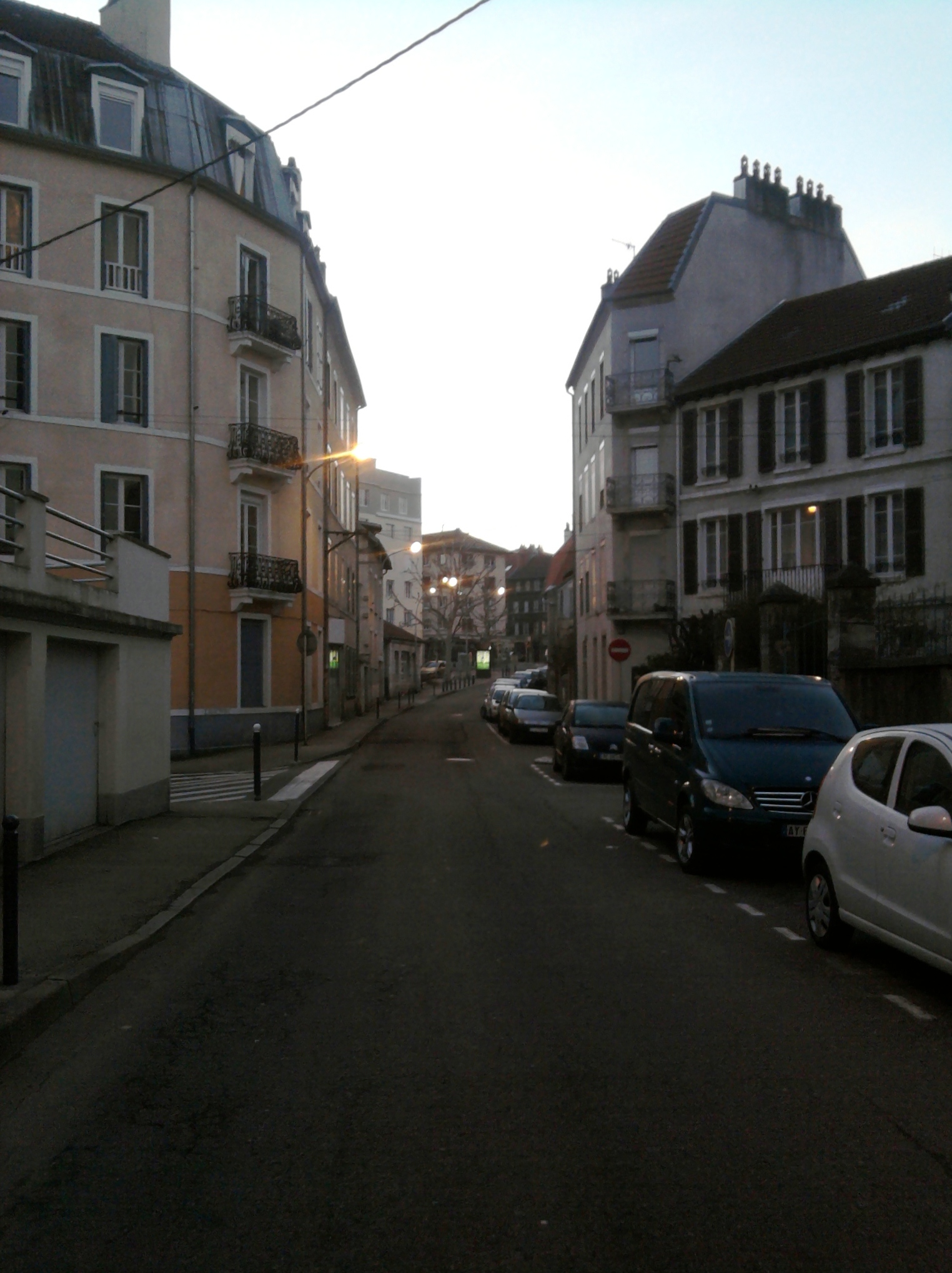
Les Chaprais

Chaprais-Cras is a district of Besançon, which was developed in the second half of the 19th century. Located in the north-east of the historic center, it has 15,500 inhabitants, which makes it the second-largest area of the city.

== Etymology ==
The name Chaprais is believed to be a contraction of the French words champs (fields) and prés (meadows), reflecting its agricultural origins.

== History ==
Chaprais-Cras began as a modest vegetable-growing hamlet in the late 18th century. Urbanization was gradual, but sped up following the construction of the Besançon Viotte train station at the northern end of the district. This growth accelerated with the addition of the Pont de la République, connecting the area more closely to the rest of the city.

By the end of the 19th century, Chaprais had become a lively and attractive area. It drew in industrial innovators such as the Schneider automobile company and also appealed to the bourgeoisie of Besançon, who built grand villas on streets like rue de Vittel. The neighborhood’s energy made it a focal point for city development, leading to the creation of a second train station, La Mouillère. This energy also led to building a spa complex that included a balneotherapy facility, a hotel, and a casino.

Despite all this development, Chaprais maintained its distinct character. One of its traits is its strong social mix, which remains evident even today.

In the early 20th century, population growth slowed. But after World War II, Chaprais experienced a new wave of vitality. Apartment buildings began to rise, and many remaining gardens were moved to the district of Vaite, shifting the area's landscape toward a more urban form.

== Geography ==
The sector is located near the historical center of Besançon, Saint-Claude and Bregille.

== Monuments ==
- The Church of Saint-Martin is a neo-Romanesque church built in 1821 and expanded in 1927. The church stands on a Latin cross plan with a spire reaching 25 meters. It replaced an earlier church destroyed during the 1814 Austrian siege.
- The Cemetery of Chaprais, opened in 1824, is known for its romantic, neoclassical, and neo-Gothic architecture. It’s often called the “Père Lachaise of Besançon” and is the final resting place of many notable figures.

== Shops ==
- Seven bakeries, including Le Fournil des Chapris, known for its fresh breads and pastries
- Four butchers
- Four grocery stores
- One fish shop
- Seven dine-in and fast food restaurants
- Two stores selling wine and beer
- Three bars and cafés
- Four florists
- Five clothing stores
- Two computer stores
- Opticians, such as Chaprais Optique on Rue de Belfort
- One lighting store
- One tobacco store
- Seven pharmacies
- Seven post offices and banks
- One art Gallery

== Radios ==
- BIP radio

== Education ==
Écoles maternelles

- Public kindergarten of Chaprais
- Public kindergarten of Fontaine-Argent
- Public kindergarten of Helvétie
- Private kindergarten of Sainte-Colette

Écoles primaires

- Public Primary School of Chaprais
- Public Primary School of Helvétie
- Private Primary School Sainte-Colette

High School and colleges

- Private college of Saint-Joseph
- Private lyceum of Saint-Joseph
- Private lyceum of Saint-Paul
- Lyceum of Art

== Transports ==
Several bus lines serve the area, including lines 1, 3, 4, 5, 6, 7, 8, 10, 20, 24, 27, 32, and 34.

== See also ==
- Besançon
- Planoise

== Sources ==
- French page about Chaprais
