= Battle of Besançon =

1575 battle of the French Wars of Religion

- Part of the French Wars of Religion
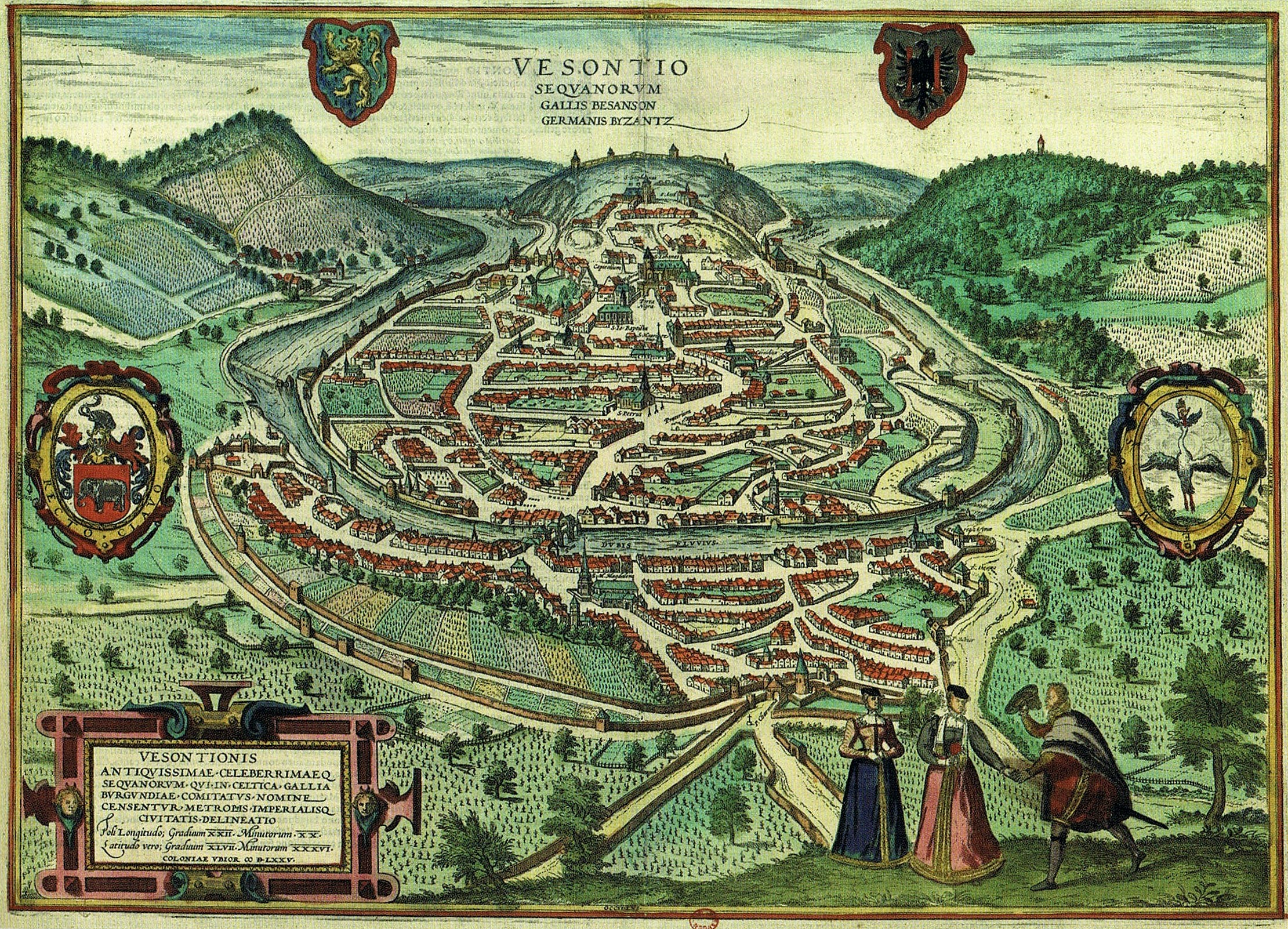
- Cavalier view of Besançon by Pierre d'Argent in 1575
Date	21 June 1575
Location	Besançon, Franche-Comté, eastern France 47°14′35″N 6°01′19″E
Result	Catholic victory

Belligerents
Huguenots	Catholics; Citizens of Besançon

Commanders and leaders
Capitaine Paul de Beaujeu	Claude de La Baume

Strength
Around 150	Around 300

Casualties and losses
At least 35	Unknown

The Battle of Besançon (21 June 1575) was a sectarian conflict between the Protestants and Catholics in the French city of Besançon in the region of Franche-Comté. Prior to the battle, the Huguenots, accused of heresy, had been expelled from the city and fled to the County of Montbéliard and Switzerland; the outcasts formed an army and planned an attempt to retake Besançon and turn the city into a stronghold of the Protestant Reformation. By the time the armed Protestants had reached the city of Besançon however, their army had dwindled because of several mishaps. Nonetheless, the battle began and raged for several hours; the outcome was an overwhelming Catholic victory. The majority of the Protestant army managed to escape, but those who were captured were hanged as traitors. For over two centuries after the battle, Protestantism in Besançon was repressed.

== Background ==
In Besançon, the Catholics had executed Protestants for religious reasons since 1528. Despite the punishment, prosecution, and banning of Protestants in Besançon, Archbishop Antoine struggled to contain the spread of Protestant ideas. The preaching of William Farel, Theodore Beza and John Calvin had resulted in people converting to Protestantism; Protestant propaganda, religious gatherings, and iconoclastic attacks on Catholic imagery had also maintained the Protestant community in Besançon. On 1 March 1562, the murder of Huguenots in Wassy, France began the French Wars of Religion. By then, Besançon had become part of an independent republic protected by the Holy Roman Empire, which mostly untouched in the beginning of the conflict. Despite the oppression in Besançon, many French Protestant reformers continued to flock to the city.

In Besançon, the people called for Catholic Philip II of Spain to help fight all heresies in 1571. In response to this, the new archbishop, Claude de La Baume, demanded that anybody suspected of heresy be expelled from Besançon. Local authorities kept count of the Protestants in the city, expelling fifty of them later. The outcast Protestants took refuge in Switzerland and Montbéliard. In the midst of increasing violence in the region after the St. Bartholomew's Day massacre in 1572, the Protestant personae non gratae gathered in Montbéliard and Neuchâtel before marching to Besançon in 1575.

== Preparations ==
Protestants in Franche-Comté had been expelled from the region, and had met in Montbéliard and Switzerland to organise the capture of Besançon. Desiring assistance, they enlisted some Swiss and Montbéliards to fight with them. Originally, the soldiers were incredibly well organised, with 300 soldiers coming from Switzerland and 150 coming from Montbéliard. No less than 6,000 men would be provided by the Holy Roman Empire if the city fell. The people of Besançon were on their guard, and the assault was carefully designed to be unexpected. According to their plans, the soldiers from Neuchâtel would enter Besançon through the Notre-Dame, and those from Montbéliard would enter the city through the Battant.

On the night of 20 June, two armed Protestant corps coming from Montbéliard and Neuchâtel were travelling to Besançon. However, some of the troops from the Neuchâtel group decided to abandon the battle, as their request for extra pay had been denied. The other soldiers continued upstream. The remaining soldiers from Neuchâtel got into a fight with the inhabitants of Morteau; after a fierce battle, they were forced to retreat. After waiting for the group from Neuchâtel, which could not be found, Capitaine Paul de Beaujeu decided to continue with the plan. By midnight, the soldiers had reached Palente, and they hid in the forests of Chalezeule while establishing a plan of attack. With the help of a dozen small boats laid end-to-end, the soldiers crossed the Doubs. To continue the attack, the soldiers would need the help of the townspeople.

== Battle ==
Equipped with ladders, ropes, weapons and ammunition, the soldiers managed to obtain the keys of the Battant through a man named Le Goux, after threatening civil law notary Jean Papay. After crossing the Battant Bridge, the soldiers entered the city and prepared to attack with the help of two townspeople; one named Recy, and the other an upholsterer named Augustin. The soldiers seized armaments located near the Battant, with the intention of sacking the archdiocese and churches, and killing Catholic priests and church leaders. The invaders then separated into groups: some gathered around the Battant, while about 70 men, on horse and foot, reached the high street; those who were approaching the Battant passed along the Rue des Granges, a major street in Besançon. Both groups were assisted by many townspeople. By this time, the Protestant invaders had destroyed several houses (such as that of Madame de Thoraise of Chavirey), and an attack on the town hall wounded one Catholic.

François de Vergy, a member of the House of Vergy, had been informed of this attack by the townspeople, and he arrived in Besançon at dawn. He asked the soldiers if they were friendly, after which the insurgents responded with violence. After several exchanges of gunfire, the battle moved to the high street where the Protestants were armed with two pieces of artillery near the Battant. Two hours after the battle moved to the high street, de Vergy led a group of monks and priests to the battle, equipped with three cannons. The first two cannons did not fire, which caused doubt in the Catholic ranks, despite having over 300 men, many more than the Protestant forces. However, the third cannon fired, successfully causing panic among the Protestants. The Protestants continued their fight regardless, using cannons, firearms, and knives in an attempt to stop the Catholic forces and Claude de La Baume, their leader. The Protestant leader was severely injured and his horse was hit, causing disorder in the ranks of Huguenot troops, ultimately resulting in them attempting to retreat from the city.

After the Protestants were caught in crossfire by townspeople engaging in the battle, many decided to flee through the Battant. They took the portcullis down, but could not find boats to cross the Doubs, so some soldiers chose to swim; many of them drowned, including goldsmith Guillaume Laboral from Montbéliard. Those who did not escape the battle were executed at the gallows. The executions occurred on the same day, or later in the week. In total, twenty Protestants were killed in combat, and two drowned in the Doubs. The Father of Faverney, Antoine d'Achey, and the army in Vesoul were dispatched to rescue the city, not knowing that the battle had already ended. Nonetheless, Luis de Requesens y Zúñiga thanked Achey for his attempts.

== Aftermath ==
The morning after the battle, forty young noblemen from Besançon, suspected of sympathizing with the Protestant insurgents, were executed after lengthy torture sessions. Other citizens suspected of heresy would receive the same punishment—some were imprisoned; others were banished from the city, or had their money and possessions taken away. Many citizens were publicly hanged in front of the city hall. Some Protestants were hanged, beheaded, and quartered, while some others were dragged onto a publicly displayed pile of bodies. Some Protestant corpses were cut up and the pieces exposed on the city gates. Masses were held at St. Jean's Cathedral and St. Stephen's Cathedral of Besançon to celebrate the defeat of the Huguenots.

To remember the Catholic victory, Claude de La Baume held a local festival that took place on 21 June, resulting in his promotion to cardinal by Pope Gregory XIII, and a pension of 1,000 ducats from Philip II of Spain. The citizens of Morteau, who stopped the troops from Neuchâtel, were made citizens of Besançon and received significant financial compensation. François de Lette, Baron of Aubonne, was forced into exile, and Paul de Beaujeu left the region and travelled to Switzerland. Following the battle, Protestantism in Besançon was repressed until the signing of the Declaration of the Rights of Man and of the Citizen, which allowed Protestants to live in the city unconstrained.

== See also ==
- French Wars of Religion
- Protestantism in Besançon
- William Farel
- Immigration to Besançon
