= Battant Bridge =

Road bridge in Besançon, France

Pont Battant
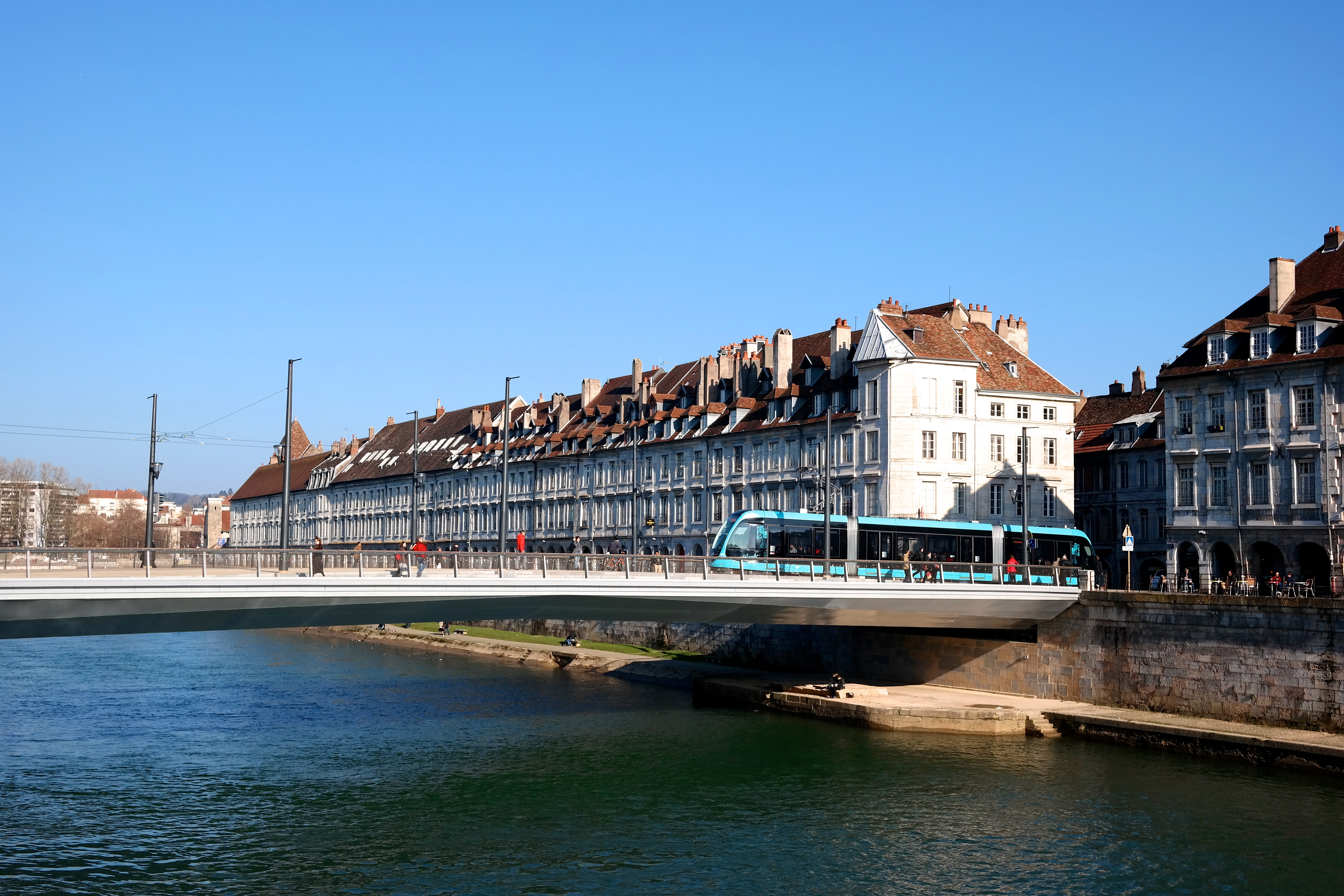
- The Pont Battant with a Besançon tramway passing over it.
- Coordinates: 47.239722°N 6.020556°E
- Carries: Road, Tramway
- Crosses: Doubs River
- Locale: Besançon, Doubs, Bourgogne-Franche-Comté, France

Characteristics
- Design: Beam bridge
- Material: Metal caissons
- Total length: 60 metres (200 ft)
- Width: 24 metres (79 ft)
- Height: 4 metres (13 ft)
- Clearance below: 8 metres (26 ft)

History
- Built: Roman era, 1944, 1953, 2013

Location
- Interactive map of Pont Battant

The Pont Battant is one of the eight road bridges in the city of Besançon, France.

== Location and access ==
The bridge spans the Doubs River, connecting the historic La Boucle district with the Battant neighborhood, linking Barrage Vauban to Place Jouffroy d'Abbans.

The tramway crosses the bridge, with a nearby stop at the Battant station. A VéloCité bike-sharing station is located at Place Jouffroy d'Abbans.

== History ==
=== Roman bridge (160–1953) ===
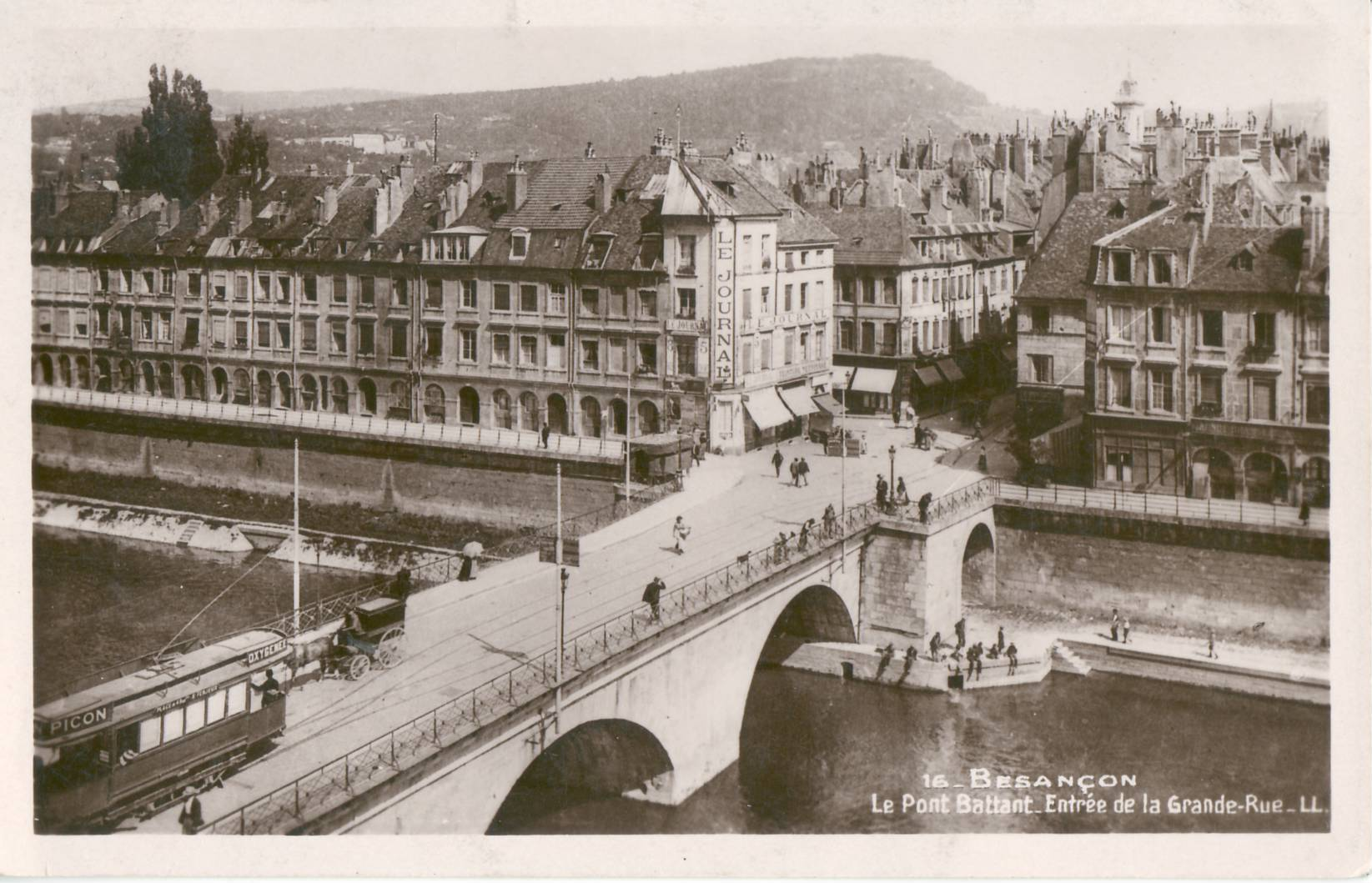
Part of the five-arch bridge in the interwar period, with a tramway.

Likely replacing a ford and later a wooden bridge, the Pont Battant was constructed during the Roman era (c. 160) with seven arches. Due to the river's wider natural bed at the time, it was broader than today. Following Roman architectural principles, the bridge was built to withstand time using durable white limestone from a quarry near Avrigney, about 30 kilometers from Vesontio. The quarry in Autoreille, named Vergenne after the stone, was used for this limestone. This oolitic limestone, resistant to frost, was also used for the Porte Noire and Besançon amphitheatre. The bridge's piermade of polygonal stones joined with iron clamps sealed with lead.

Until the late 17th century, it was the only bridge crossing the Doubs in Besançon, serving as a vital link for trade between the historic district and the expanding Battant neighborhood during Roman times.

By the early modern period, only five arches remained visible, as others were buried under the cardo, which became the Grande Rue. The bridge was paved with stone blocks measuring 2 by 0.7 metres (6.6 by 2.3 ft), over 35 centimetres (14 in) thick. It underwent repairs and expansions in 1453, 1506, 1688 (when Quai Vauban encroached on half an arch), and 1729. In 1761, engineer Jean Querret prevented its demolition, despite municipal plans for a wider structure. The city considered replacing it with a broader bridge.

During the Middle Ages, the bridge was lined with shops. On 30 June 1452, a fire sparked at a butcher's house near the fish market devastated the area, destroying half the shops. The last shops were removed in 1841 during a final widening to 6 metres (20 ft) between sidewalks. In 1265, the Archbishop of Besançon ordered the construction of three overhanging buildings with gateways, which stood until 1677.

A stone cross, present since the 13th century, was destroyed during the French Revolution, later restored, and removed again in 1880 amid tensions between the Republic and the Church. Besançon residents long believed it commemorated the failed Huguenot attack in 1575. In 1880, Jules Ferry, as Minister of Education, issued decrees expelling Jesuits from France and requiring congregations to seek authorization or face dissolution. As Prime Minister, he advanced secularization through public education reforms.

After the French conquest of 1678, a triumphal arch honoring Louis XIV was built at the bridge's La Boucle end between 1691 and 1693. It was dismantled in 1776 due to falling frost-damaged stones. A casemate under the bridge on the left bank was removed around 1828 to allow a towpath.

During the 1814 siege, General Marulaz considered cutting the bridge to isolate La Boucle but abandoned the plan after reading a letter, attributed to Fénelon but written by the Countess of Montrond.

The Roman bridge withstood floods in 1570, 1789, and 1802. On 18 September 1852, it narrowly escaped cannon destruction during a critical flood. The water receded just in time. The construction of Quai Vauban (1695) on the left bank and Quai de Strasbourg and Veil-Picard (1874–1879) on the right reduced the visible arches to three. The first arch was buried under Quai de Strasbourg, but a diversion canal allowed water flow during floods. Quai Vauban's casemate reduced another arch to a half-arch, blocking river passage.

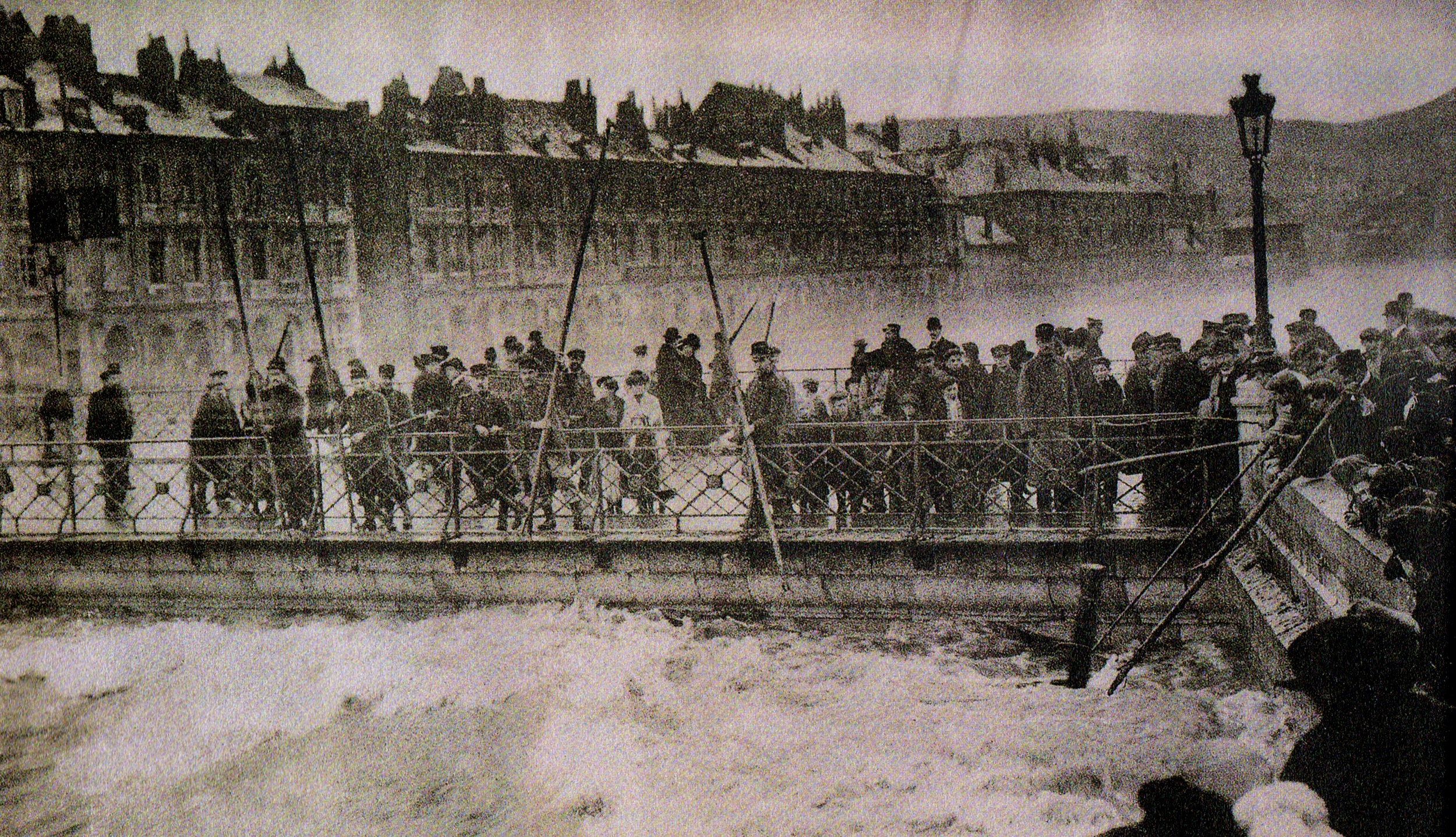
Pont Battant on 21 January 1910.

In early 1910, relentless rain and snowmelt caused the Doubs to rise. On 18 January, water levels increased, reaching 5.31 metres (17.4 ft) by 19 January, 6.90 metres (22.6 ft) on the morning of 20 January, and 8.68 metres (28.5 ft) by 17:00. The historic peak of 9.57 metres (31.4 ft) occurred at 02:00 on 21 January. Logs from Novillars paper mills struck the piers, forming a dam that raised the upstream water level by 1.50 metres (4.9 ft) compared to downstream. Crossing was banned at the peak. While the bridge sustained no major damage, other city infrastructure was heavily impacted. Plans to replace it with a single-arch bridge emerged then. From 1897 to 1952, a tramway line from Grande Rue crossed the Doubs, continuing via Quai Veil-Picard to Rue de Dole and Cité Rosemont.

The northernmost arch, near Quai Veil-Picard and Quai de Strasbourg, was destroyed during World War II—by the French in June 1940 and by the Germans in September 1944. The bridge was demolished in 1953 and replaced with a single-arch prestressed concrete bridge to better handle floodwaters. The base of a Roman pier remains on the left bank.

=== Modern bridges ===
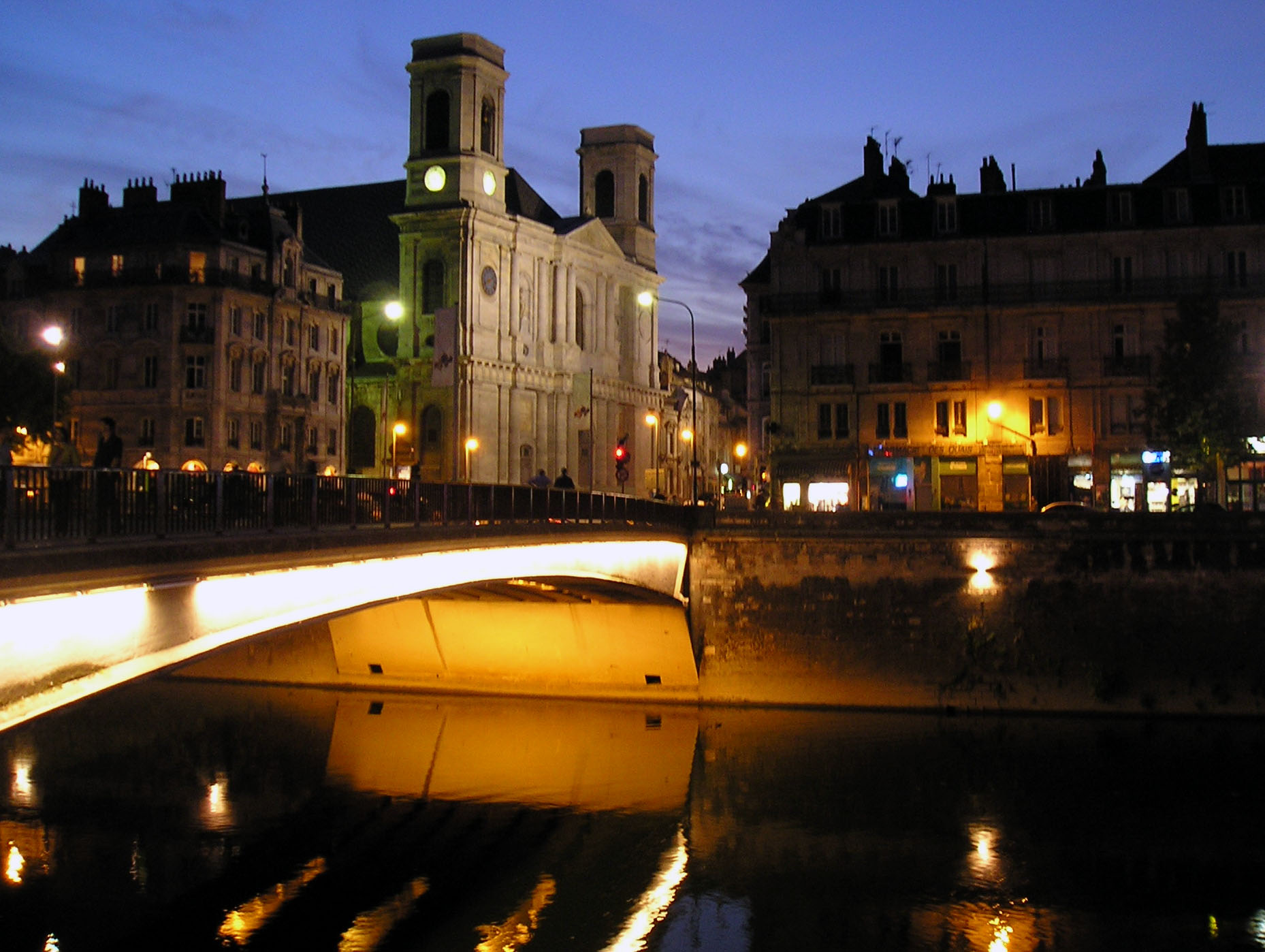
1953 bridge and Battant neighborhood at night

In 1944, after partial destruction, the bridge was restored with its three arches. In 1953, it was demolished to mitigate flooding that disrupted traffic and to accommodate growing tourist river traffic. A single-arch prestressed concrete bridge replaced it. In the early 21st century, it was restricted to buses and cyclists due to revised traffic plans in La Boucle.

Located 8 metres (26 ft) above the Doubs, the bridge was approximately 60 metres (200 ft) long and 17 metres (56 ft) wide. A pioneering prestressed concrete single-span bridge in France, it required 3,000 tons of concrete. Its railings were green-painted wrought iron, often adorned with planters. Street vendors set up stalls seasonally. Deemed obsolete and too narrow for the tramway, it was replaced in June 2013 with a bridge closed to cars. In January 2014, the Besançon tramway crossed it for the first time.

Constructed from assembled metal caissons, this bridge is notably thin, enhancing the view of Quai Vauban. Like its predecessor, it is 60 metres (200 ft) long but 7 metres (23 ft) wider at 24 metres (79 ft), accommodating the 2014 tramway. The extra width allows the tram to curve from Quai Veil-Picard onto the bridge while ensuring safety for pedestrians and cyclists. The tram tracks form an "S" shape between Place de la Révolution and Place Jouffroy d’Abbans. Steps separate the tram section from pedestrian areas.

Similar to the Pont des Arts in Paris, couples attach padlocks to the bridge's railings. By June 2015, the municipality counted 400 padlocks and permitted the practice. This is far fewer than the 700,000 padlocks on the Parisian bridge, removed due to a 45 tonnes (50 tons) overload.

== Notable buildings and memorials ==
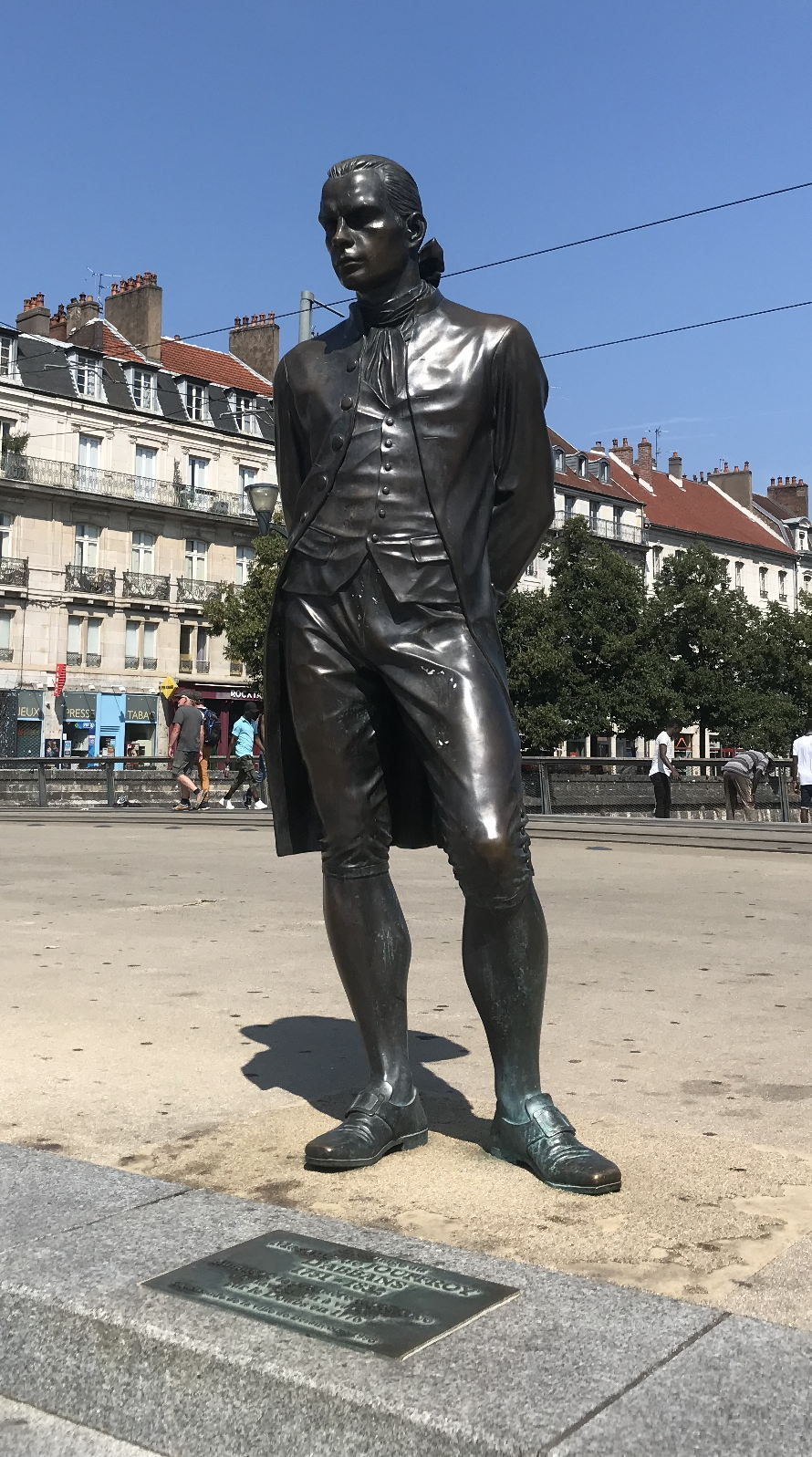
Statue of Jouffroy d’Abbans on the bridge.

Since 2015, a statue by Pascal Coupot on the bridge honors Claude François Jouffroy d'Abbans (1751–1832), a pioneer of steam navigation who tested his designs on the Doubs in 1778. Originally placed in 1998 on the Quai Veil-Picard sidewalk near the bridge. Another statue of Jouffroy d’Abbans stands on the Promenade de l’Helvétie nearby.

Since 2011, a plaque at the bridge's entrance reads:

In Memory of the Algerians Victims of the Repression During a Peaceful Demonstration on 17 October 1961 in Paris.

Each 17 October, a flower-throwing ceremony into the Doubs is held nearby to "never forget."

== See also ==
- History of Besançon

== Bibliography ==
- Defrasne, Jean (1999). "Le pont Battant" [Battant Bridge]. Battant: Au pays des Bousbots [Battant: In the land of the Bousbots] (in French). Yens-sur-Morge: Cabédita. pp. 9–12. ISBN 2-88295-264-3.
