= History of the Jews in Besançon =

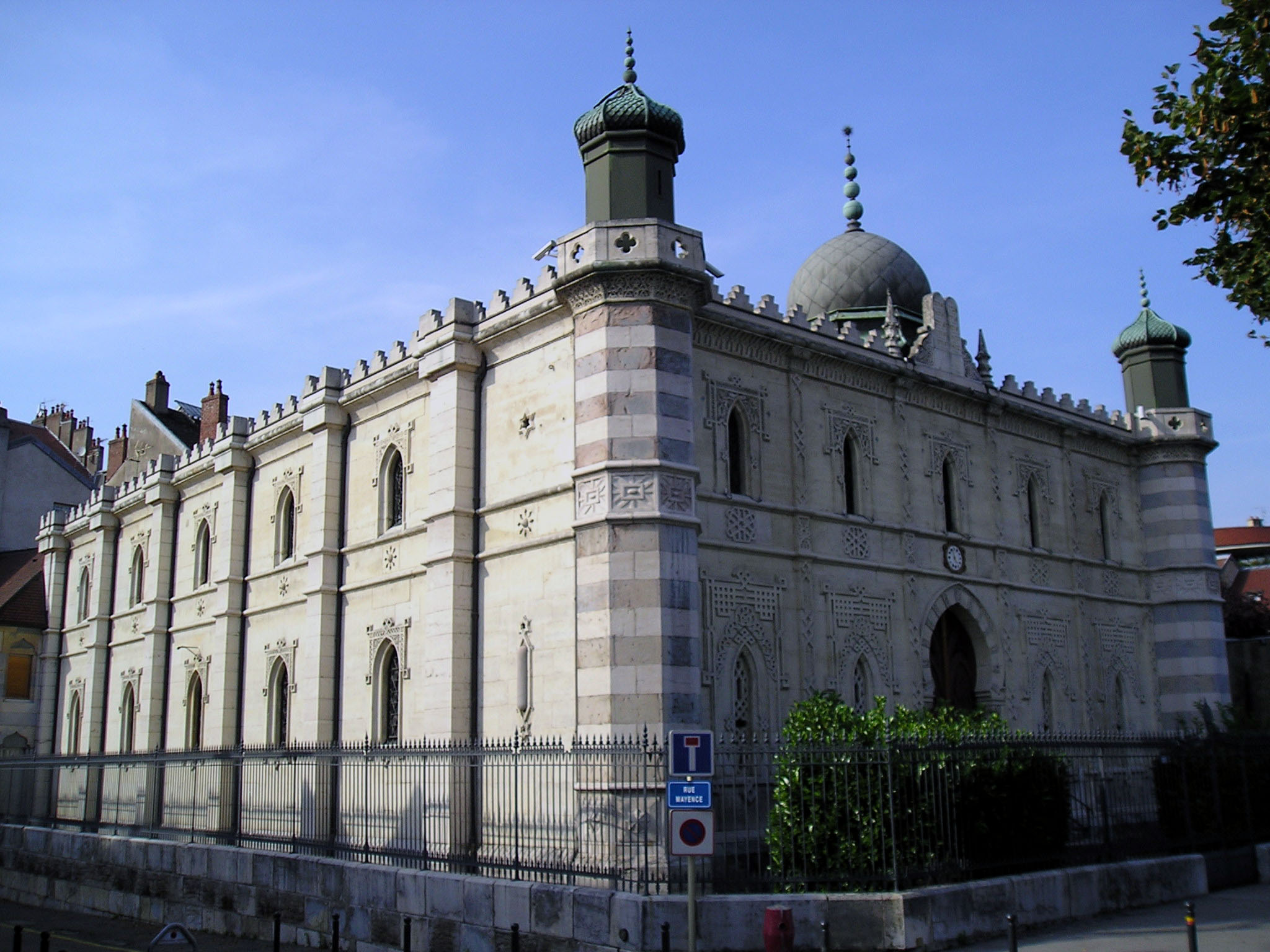
Synagogue of Besançon

The beginnings of the history of the Jews in Besançon go back to the Middle Ages, a period during which the Jews settled in the city attracted by its activity as a commercial place. The community was founded at the end of the 14th century and, due to its status as a free imperial city, Besançon remained one of the only territories in present-day France to tolerate Jews after their expulsion from the kingdom of France in 1394. The community was nevertheless expelled in turn from Besançon in the middle of the 15th century. The Jews made a tentative return to the city in the 18th century, but it was only after the French Revolution, which emancipated them, that their situation in the Franche-Comté capital stabilized. Although the Jewish community never exceeded 2,000 people except on the eve of the Second World War, it experienced great economic success during the Industrial Revolution at the end of the 19th century, when the Lipmann family founded LIP, a brand of watchmaking which then became one of the economic engines of the region and remained associated with the name of the city.

The importance of the community was recognized in 1881 by the signing of a decree authorizing the creation of a consistory based in Besançon. During the Second World War, the Besançon community, like the rest of the Jews of France, was hit hard by the Nazi anti-Semitic policies. From the 1950s, the arrival of Jews from North Africa brought vitality to the community and gave it a new face. The synagogue of Besançon, the Jewish cemetery and the Castle of the Jewess are all testimonies to the contribution of this community to the history of Besançon.

== History ==
=== Middle Ages ===
Before the Middle Ages, there is no evidence of a Jewish presence in the region, although it cannot be ruled out: at the height of the Roman Empire, 10% of the general population was Jewish and, in Gaul, the presence of Jews is attested particularly in the Rhone Valley from the third century. Thus it is possible that there were Roman Jews in Besançon (then known as Vesuntio in Latin) although nothing formally proves it.

It is therefore in the 13th and 14th centuries that the history of the Jewish population in Besançon can be traced with certainty. In the 13th century, many Jewish traders regularly passed through Besançon, being a privileged commercial place due to its proximity to Germany and Italy. A letter from Pope Innocent IV sent in 1245 to the Archbishop of Besançon asking him to enforce the wearing of the rota by the Jews confirms their presence in the region from that time.

In the 14th century, the municipal government of Besançon decided to grant Jewish residence permits on its territory, subject to a right of entrage (entry fee) as well as an annual tax known as a cens. In 1393, documents attest that twelve Jewish families had settled in the city, and that they "supported Joseph de Trèves as master of their school." The following year, a Besançon citizen was sentenced to a fine of 60 sous for having beaten one of the Jews, who were "in the guard of the city". It seems that some Jews in France took refuge in Besançon in the mid-14th century to escape the fine ordered against the Jews for participation in the 1321 lepers' plot, a Jewish conspiracy theory that they had allied with the lepers and the Muslim Kingdom of Granada to poison the wells. In 1394, King Charles VI of France expelled the Jews from his states, and Duke Philippe the Bold did the same in the Duchy of Burgundy.

However, the city of Besançon, as a free imperial city, was not affected by these restrictive measures. It thus became a refuge for Jews expelled from neighboring states, which fueled the demographic growth of the Besançon community. The Jews of the city became butchers, bankers, and goldsmiths, and occupied an increasingly important place within the city. Little by little, they became the richest category of inhabitants of the region, so much so that some of them repeatedly advanced money to the city. In the Middle Ages, the Jewish population settled mainly in the neighborhoods located outside La Boucle, in the current district of Battant. Documents also attest to the presence of a synagogue in Battant, on Grand Charmont Street. The city's first Jewish cemetery, named Calmoutier Cemetery, was established north of the city, in the current Montrapon-Fontaine-Écu district.

In the late Middle Ages (14th and 15th centuries), the status of the Jews deteriorated and, beyond doctrinal controversies, they were blamed for the main troubles and calamities ravaging the country, in particular the Black Death, and were then expelled. The sale of the Jewish cemetery by the Besançon municipality in 1465 marks the end of the community for more than three centuries.

=== Modern history ===
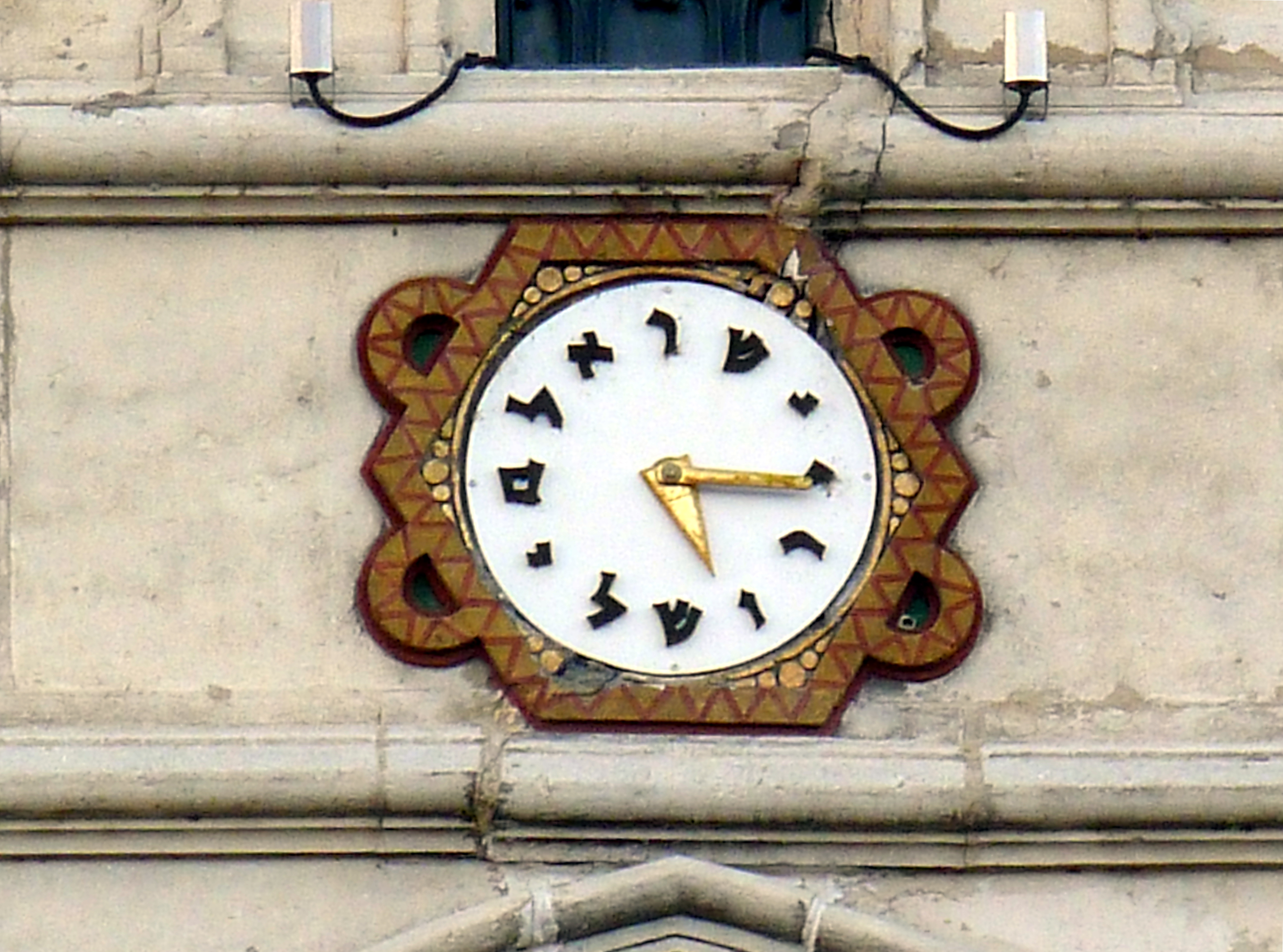
Clock of the synagogue of Besançon, which uses the letters from the Hebrew inscription ישראל ירושלים ("Israel Jerusalem") in lieu of numbers

Besançon became part of France, like the rest of Franche-Comté, with the Treaty of Nijmegen of 1678. The registers of municipal deliberations indicate in 1693 that it was forbidden for Jewish merchants to frequent the city without having declared themselves beforehand. They could not then stay for more than three consecutive days and were prohibited from doing business without the assistance of one of the municipal leaders. However, this restriction had some exceptions, notably in May 1736, when two Jews from Metz were allowed to trade for eight days a year. In 1754, a tolerance of a few months' stay was granted to Jews of the Vidal family, who were important silk merchants, or again in 1768, when the Jew Salomon Sax was authorized to practice gemstone engraving in Besançon, but on condition of not trading in his work.

At the start of the French Revolution, Jews were still prohibited from staying more than three consecutive days in Besançon, and they also had to confine themselves to certain trades. This is how in December 1790, Antoine Melchior Nodier (father of Charles Nodier), then mayor of Besançon, had the Jews Wolf and Caïn expelled by bailiffs with the approval of the municipality, for having traded longer than the law allowed them to.

On September 27, 1791, French citizenship was granted to Jews, subject to taking the civic oath. Pogroms broke out following the recognition of the French citizenship of the Jews in Alsace and more particularly in Sundgau, and some Alsatian Jews were hanged on the fangs of the butcher shops. The survivors fled to the south of France and some families settled in Besançon. In 1792, the community petitioned the municipality to obtain a synagogue, and shortly afterward, they obtained authorization to meet in the former convent of the Cordeliers (now the building of the Lycée Pasteur de Besançon). These new families quickly came under attack from the Jacobin newspaper La Vedette. This newspaper criticized the Jews for their loyalty to Judaism and their rest on Shabbat. In 1793, they were forced to close their place of prayer, just like the Catholics. This situation gradually subsided in the following years, after the end of the Reign of Terror. In 1796, the Jews (about 86 people in 1808) of the city acquired a new cemetery on the current Anne Frank Street, still existing today. It was enlarged in 1839 and today includes about a thousand tombs.

=== 19th Century ===
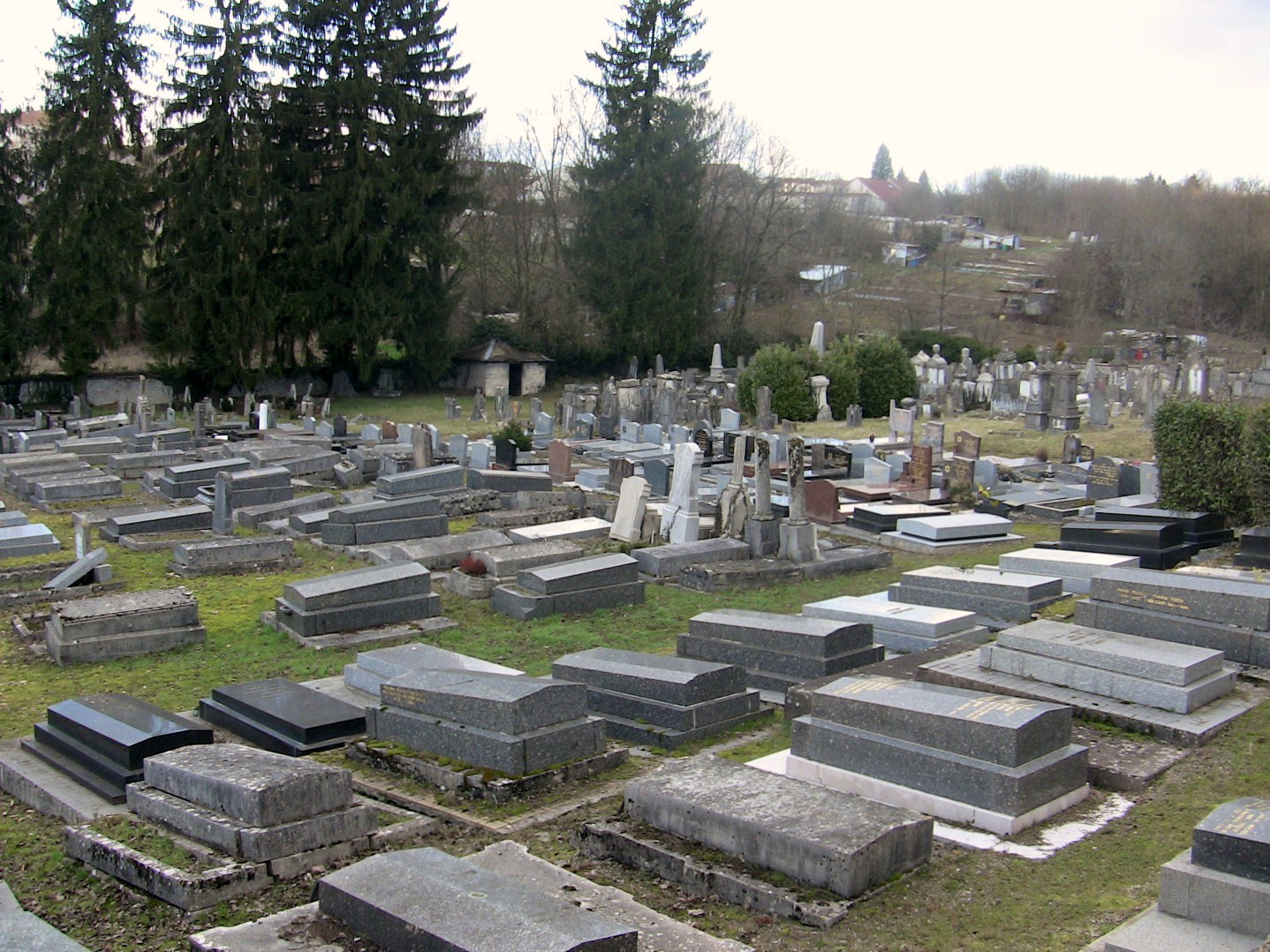
The Jewish cemetery of Besançon, situated on Anne Frank St, that was acquired in 1796.

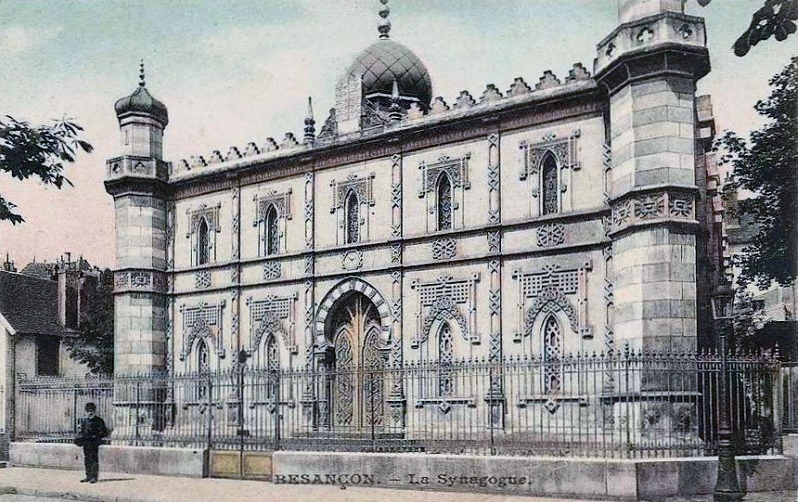
The Synagogue of Besançon at an unknown date, likely 19th century.

The 19th century was one of growth for the Besançon Jewish community. Indeed, twice, Alsatian Jews came to settle in Besançon: the first time after the anti-Jewish riots in Alsace; the second after the annexation of that province by Germany in 1871. The embryonic community institutions at the beginning of the century developed considerably, and the members of the community distinguished themselves in the economy and local politics, despite certain anti-Jewish feelings which occasionally resurfaced within the population.

==== Demography ====
On March 29, 1808, Bigot de Préameneu, then Minister of Religious Affairs, asked the prefect of the Doubs department Jean Antoine Debry to take a census of the Jews in his area. The mayor of Besançon, Baron Antoine Louis Daclin, therefore drew up a list of all the Jews in the city. The result, completed in 1809, concluded that the city had 28 heads of Jewish families for a total of 155 people. The survey also indicated that a large part of the Jews of the city were from Haute-Alsace, and that the oldest of them had been settled in Besançon since 1787.

The Jewish population continued to increase in the 1830s, and there were then 120 families in the city, or 650 people.

In the 1850s and 1860s, the strong community then of about 560 members occupied new urban spaces. Two poles seem to emerge: first, the popular and frequented district of Battant, and second, La Boucle, the historic center of Besançon, in particular in the Grande Rue and Granges Street.

At the end of the 19th century, after the occupation of Alsace by the Germans and the Franco-Prussian War of 1871, new Jews settled in the so-called Arènes district, a sector at the time bringing together a large number of merchants and street vendors. The life of the community was refocused around the synagogue, in the district of Battant. In 1872, an independent consistory was created in Besançon. By the end of the century, several Besançon Jews had achieved great social and economic success and were present in, for example, the industrial sector (60% of the watch industry belonged to LIP) and the banking sector (the Veil-Picard family). In 1897, the Central Consistory counted 763 Jews in Besançon, which is probably underestimated, since, of course, some Jewish families did not join that organization.

==== Community organization ====
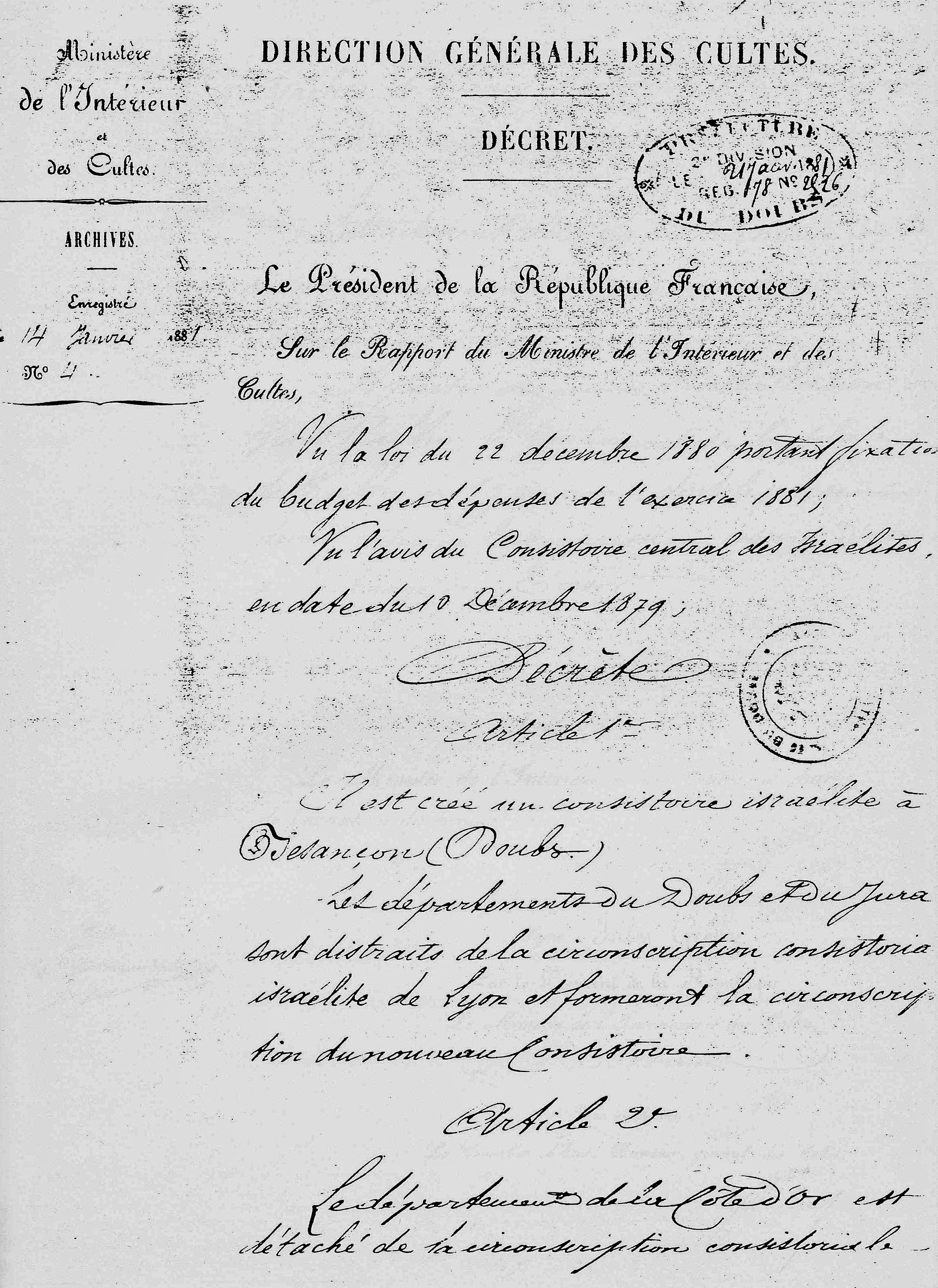
Decree of the General Directorate of Religions (Direction Générale des Cultes), dated January 14, 1881 authorizing the creation of a central consistory in Besançon.

The Besançon community sent a delegate to the Assembly of Jewish notables and to the Sanhedrin convened by Napoleon. In 1804, after the troubled period of the Revolution, a report to the prefect of Doubs mentions the presence of Jews residing in the city: "Their synagogue is not organized in Besançon. They do assemble, however, but without a permanent leader as such. A rabbi from Dijon comes twice a year to preside over their ceremonies." The only Jewish place of worship in Besançon in the 1830s was a small synagogue that a hundred of the wealthiest Jews had had developed by the municipal architect Pierre Marnotte. The building is located at number 19 Madeleine Street and is recognizable by its facade pierced with ogival windows, but the building was too dilapidated to continue to serve as a place of prayer for the growing community. The city's current synagogue was built in 1869 on the Quai Napoléon.

In 1808, a centralized Jewish organization, the Central Consistory, was created by imperial decree along with regional consistories; the different communities were required to adhere to it. Besançon was first attached to Nancy in 1810 and had to pay its membership with a contribution of 42,470 francs. A decree of August 24, 1857 connected the community of Besançon to the consistory of Lyon without this time needing to spend funds. Another imperial decree of August 1, 1864 authorized the creation of a rabbinical seat in Besançon. Shortly after, Jacques Auscher, former rabbi of Saint-Étienne became the first Grand Rabbi of the city. In February 1870, he sent a letter to the prefect of Doubs, asking for the creation of a consistory for the departments of Doubs and Jura, detached from the consistory of Lyon to which the two departments were then attached. He wrote: "The expediency of our request is based first of all on the precise texts of the organic law of our worship, a law which declares obligatory the erection of a Consistory where a group of 2,000 Israelites can be gathered, that is to say in a single department, or in several contiguous departments. Besançon already has an important community, schools, Benevolent Societies, a beautiful Temple, new and rich, erected thanks to the sacrifices of the community."

Nearly ten years later, despite a favorable opinion from the prefect of Doubs who forwarded the document to the Minister of Religious Affairs, nothing had significantly changed. Jacques Auscher then wrote again to the prefect: "We have been waiting in vain for 10 years. We have only received good words from the Ministry of Worship. 4,000 francs would be necessary and do not appear in the budget of 1881. However, it would be a powerful attraction for Alsatian immigration, already so strong in this region; and this creation is strongly desired by one of the most numerous groups of French Jews. Finally, [there is] the deep attachment of the Israelites of this region to our excellent Government – is this not worthy of a reward desired for ten years and which will cost our national budget so little, so minimally?" Minister of the Interior and Religious Affairs, Ernest Constans, ended up giving satisfaction to the community. On January 13, 1881, the Consistory for the Doubs and the Jura was officially created, bringing together the communities of Montbéliard, L'Isle-sur-le-Doubs, Baume-les-Dames, Dole as well as Lons-le-Saunier.

==== Geographical distribution ====
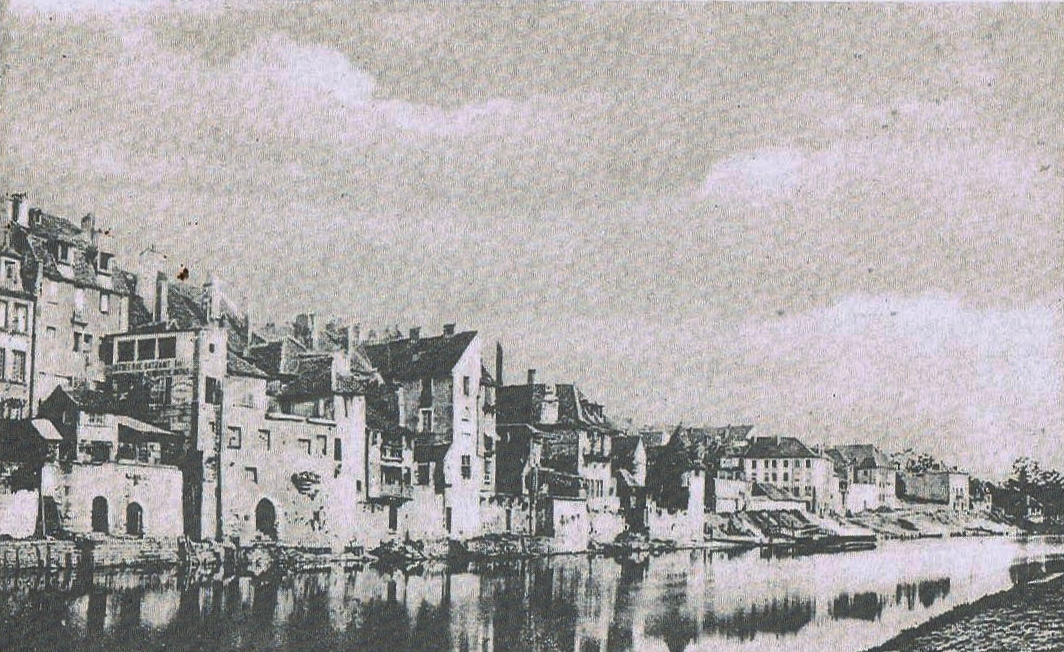
Battant neighborhood, 1860s.

The Jews of Besançon, since the beginning of the community, have been established in specific geographical areas: they have always favored the district of Battant and more particularly the Quai de Strasbourg, the Quai Veil-Picard, the Rue Marulaz, Rue Richebourg, Fort Griffon and the Grapille de Battant. Even in the Middle Ages, the few Besançon Jews were already centered around the Rue Richebourg, near their medieval cemetery which has now disappeared. According to writings, there was a "street of the Jews" in the 12th century and 14th century without more precision. On their return to the city, after the emancipation and especially at the beginning of the 19th century, they naturally inhabited these sectors, with a preference for the Arènes district comprising the eponymous street, the Rue de Vignier, the Rue de Charmont and Rue de Battant. They then practiced an intense community life there in what one can concretely call a Jewish quarter, particularly around the Arena synagogue

From the 1850s, the community was divided into two sectors: 211 people in the Battant and Madeleine neighborhoods in 1851, i.e. nearly half of the members of the community, the others mainly in the Boucle sector (186 people) and more precisely the Grande Rue (66 people) but very few in the outlying areas (for example, only two households representing 11 people in Saint-Claude.) This displacement was partly due to socioeconomic phenomena, the less modest part of the Jews leaving the often unsanitary housing of Battant, and eager to integrate into the sphere of the elites of the city. Merchants, wealthy craftsmen, liberal professions, rentiers and landlords resided mainly inside La Boucle, while the less well-off Jews, peddlers, second-hand goods dealers, day laborers, remained in Battant where Jewish traditions were liveliest.

The members of the community who left Battant for La Boucle wanted to mark their economic success but also to be recognized and integrated into the bourgeois society of the city. This new integration resulted in a distancing from Jewish community life and religious practice for the latter. The same phenomenon was observed during the interwar period, when Jewish populations from Eastern Europe who had just arrived settled around Rue Bersot and Battant. From 1936 onward, they gradually moved towards the historic center in the same way as their predecessors, in connection with a growing social integration into the majority society. Today, the dilution and dispersion of the community means that there is no longer any Jewish connotation in the Battant and Madeleine districts, except for the presence of the Besançon synagogue and the remains of the old temple of Charmont. There are not many followers left around the synagogue, with the notable exception of the most religious.

==== Relations with the local population ====
In the 1820s, the mayor of Besançon sent the prefect of Doubs a report on the Jews of the city:

They constantly gave evidence of submission and obedience to the laws. They pay exactly their contribution to the Receiver General and Treasurer of the Doubs department. They do not evade the law of military conscription... All, according to their means, engage in commercial speculation: several go to work in watchmaking, others buy and resell fabrics, silver wares, jewelry, hardware items.

Friction existed at the end of the 19th century between the Jewish community and the local population, which had remained very Catholic, as noted in 1872 by a judge of the Jewish faith practicing in Besançon who indicated that he encountered great difficulties in his work. In the 1890s, the Dreyfus Affair, one of the major miscarriages of justice in French history, broke out. This affair, which lasted 12 years, took place against a background of espionage and anti-Semitism and deeply divided the French, to the extent that the political stability of the country was threatened. In Besançon, it was feared that pogroms would break out, since anti-Semitism was widespread. Indeed, this case served as a pretext for some inhabitants of Besançon, envious of the Jews' success, to attack them. However, the coming to power of a new political party in the city (the Radical Socialists) and the pardon and rehabilitation of Alfred Dreyfus put an end to these rivalries.

=== First World War ===
The Jewish population of Besançon was affected, like all French people, by the First World War. A war memorial was erected in memory of the members of the Besançon community killed in action during the conflict, at the entrance to the town's Jewish cemetery. At the foot of the monument is inscribed " Ah! Our youth! Our pride... Oh! how the heroes fell! (II SAM 1.19.)", and a cockade of French remembrance is also attached to the foot of the building. Twenty names are engraved on this monument to the dead.

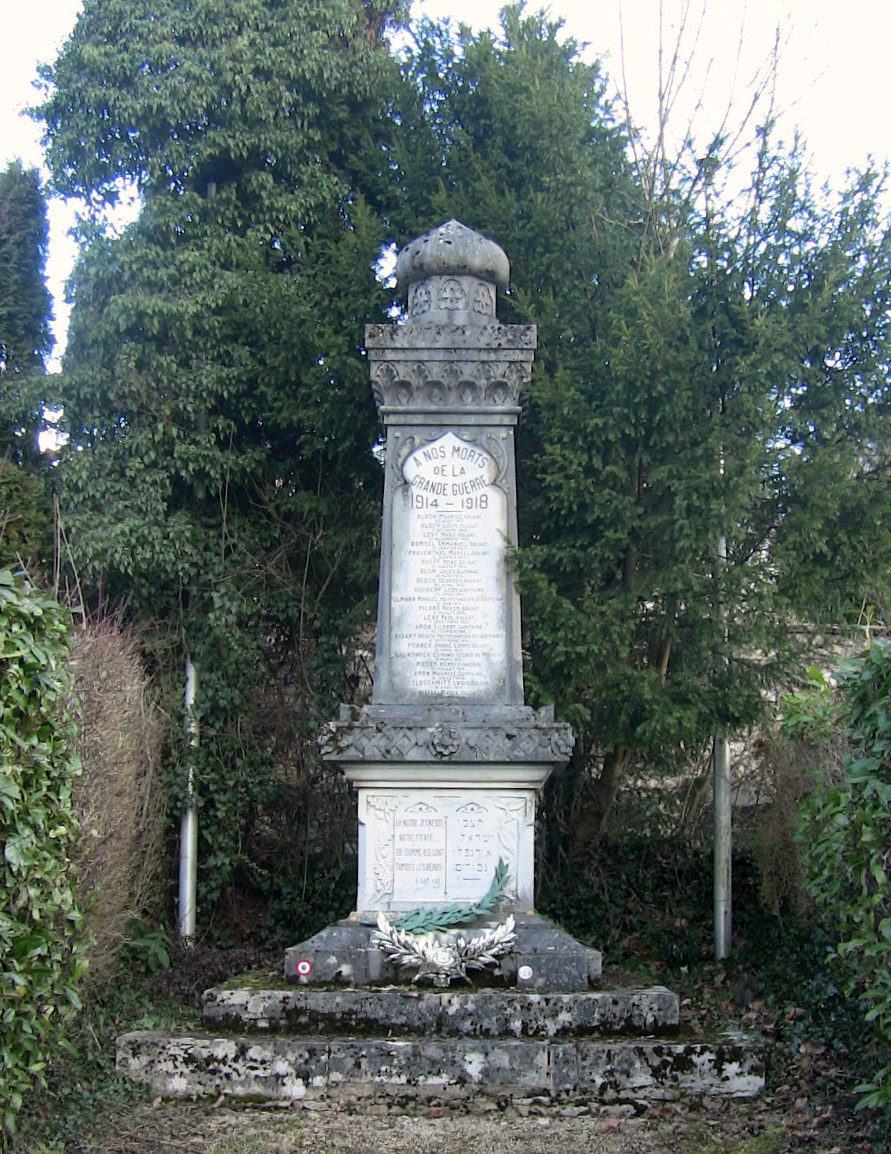
Monument to the Jewish community's soldiers who perished in World War I.

=== Second World War ===
During the 1930s, a significant number of Jews from Germany, Austria and Poland settled in France, fearing the rise of anti-Semitism in their countries of origin. So much so that in 1934, the city of Besançon had around 2,500 Jews, most of them recently settled, coming from Eastern Europe. This immigration only increased by 1939, with the Anschluss and the war between the Allies and the Axis. As everywhere in France, the Jewish population was hunted down by the German and Vichy authorities. During this period, 82 people from Besançon were killed in deportation (including about forty Jews), and 302 in the Doubs department (including 102 Jews). Among these victims were the Besançon brothers Jean and Pierre Chaffanjon, both deported and murdered, and whose name a street in Bregille bears, as well as the Dreyfus family, five of whose members suffered the same fate. Eighteen-year-old Colette Godchot was detained in the middle of class on February 24, 1944, at the age of 18. She was deported to Auschwitz (Poland) where she died with her mother in 1944.

Several Torah scrolls kept in the synagogue during the German occupation were saved from destruction thanks to Bishop Maurice-Louis Dubourg, then Archbishop of Besançon, his childhood friend Dr. Maxime Druhen, and Canon Rémillet, parish priest of the Sainte-Madeleine church. They hid these rolls in the workroom of the church until the liberation of the city, and thus protected them from abandonment and desecration.

Today, the Museum of Resistance and Deportation, located in the heart of the Citadel of Besançon, collects a large number of objects and documents related to this era of history in Europe, in France and in Franche-Comté. The monument to the Liberation, located in the area of the Chapelle des Buis, also recalls the names of all those lost in the war.

=== Present day ===
After the war, the Jewish community slowly came back to life and numbered 120 families in 1960.

About 200 Jews from North Africa settled in Besançon following the independence of Morocco, Tunisia and then Algeria, during the years 1950–1960, to the point that services at the synagogue are now of the Sephardic rite.

The Jewish population in 2010 was about 150 families and consisted mainly of tradespeople, executives and employees. In the 1970s, the "Maison Jérôme Cahen" (named after the rabbi of Besançon in the 1960s and 1970s) was created, which organizes and focuses community actions, in particular Shabbat meals, theater rehearsals, and Talmud Torah lessons. In connection with it, it serves as the premises for the city's Jewish associations, such as the Association Culturelle Israélite, the Amitiés judéo-chrétiennes, the Éclaireurs Israélites de France ... and thus contributes to religious and linguistic education (with a course of modern Hebrew) in addition to a supply of kosher products. Since 2008 there is also the Radio Shalom station in Besançon.

== Jewish residents of Besançon ==
A large number of Besançon's personalities are of Jewish origin relative to the size of the community, and some have left traces of their presence in the city. One example is the Veil-Picard monument, located on Place Granvelle in the heart of the historic center, on which is engraved "To the benefactor Adolphe Veil-Picard. His fellow citizens." Indeed, Adolphe Veil-Picard and his father, Aaron Veil-Picard, subsidized works in the city, in particular the enlargement of the Saint-Jacques hospital and the construction of the current Quai de Strasbourg. Adolphe also participated in the development of local watchmaking and local industry in general, made numerous donations to charitable works and offered large sums for the development of Bacchus Plaza as well as for the construction of the Quai d'Arènes which today bears his name. One of his eight children, Arthur-Georges, became locally famous as a merchant and art lover. Even today, descendants of this family reside in Besançon as well as in Alsace.

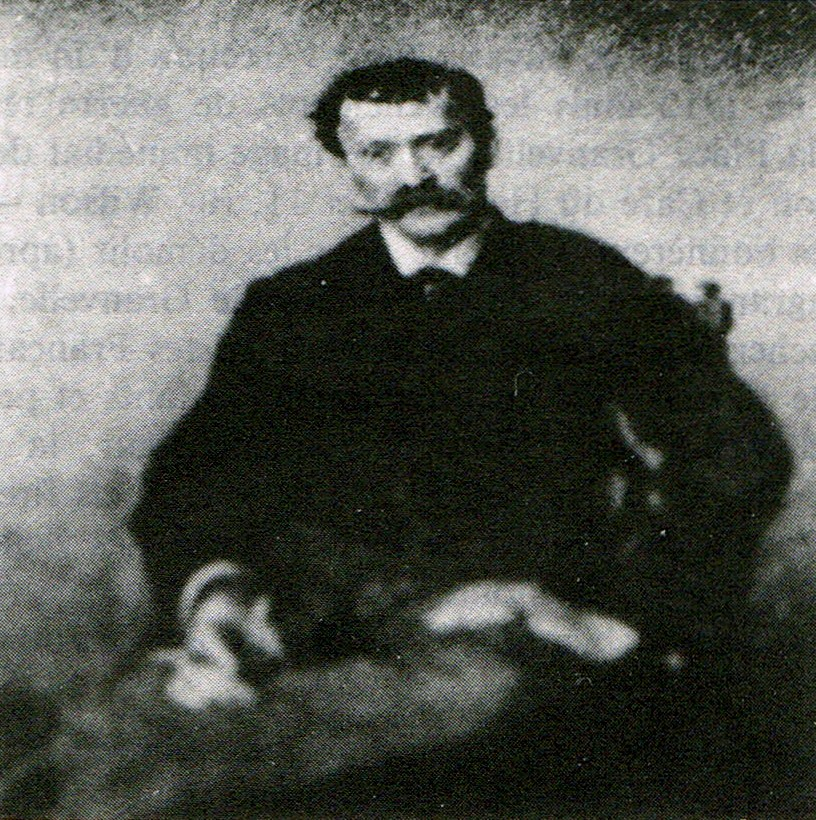
Arthur-Georges Veil-Picard, one of the sons of Adolphe Veil-Picard.

The Weil family, considered to be the founders of the most important French company for men's textiles, is also from the city. Established in Besançon since 1872, it was founded by Joseph Weil, who in 1878 owned one of the largest clothing factories in the city. This company continued to grow until it became the largest French men's textile company in 1965, employing 1,500 that year and even having to leave the city center to settle in more spacious premises in Fontaine-Écu. The synagogue of Besançon has also known some famous rabbis, such as Paul Haguenauer, who was Chief Rabbi from 1907 to 1914, when he had to leave to become a military chaplain. René Gutman, rabbi from January 1, 1980, to June 30, 1985, later became the chief rabbi of Strasbourg. Others, such as Constant Mayer, distinguished themselves abroad in art and culture.

But it is certainly the Lipmann family, who arrived in Besançon during the Revolution, founders of the LIP factory, which is the best known of the Jewish families of Besançon. According to multiple sources, Emmanuel Lipmann, perhaps president of the Jewish community at the time (there was no Jewish consistory in France before 1808), offered a pocket-watch to Napoleon either in 1800, when the latter was First Consul, or in 1807 after he had become Emperor. Sixty years later, his grandson Emmanuel and his children created a watchmaking company, the "Lipmann counter" which sold the "Lip chronometer" from 1896. It was after the Second World War that Lip watches, spurred on by Fred Lipmann, whose parents died in Auschwitz, reached its peak with the first electronic watch and employed 1,450 workers in the 1960s in the Palente neighborhood, before declining in the 1970s.

== Buildings and institutions ==
=== The community center ===
The Jewish community center, called "Maison du rabbi Cahen" in reference to the Besançon rabbi of the 1960s, is located on Rue Grosjean near Viotte station. It was opened in the 1970s, when the Jewish community decided to expand beyond strictly denominational activities, by offering cultural activities as well. Its primary function is to serve as premises for associations linked to the Besançon consistory, such as the Israelite Cultural Association, the Judeo-Christian Friendships, the Israelite Scouts of France, and the Female Cooperation in addition to hosting Shabbat meals, theatrical performances, numerous meetings with neighboring communities, a place for teaching Talmud Torah and Hebrew, a youth center, a nursery for small children and finally as a place for certain ancillary ceremonies.

=== Places of worship ===
The first Besançon synagogue was located in the district of Battant, Rue du Grand Charmont. This place of worship was located on the first floor of a 13th-century house, which was converted into a vast and elegant room.

The building eventually became too cramped for the community (about 600 people in the 19th century), and was replaced by another synagogue on Rue de la Madeleine, which then gave way to the current synagogue, inaugurated on November 18, 1869. This new synagogue, located on the Quai de Strasbourg, is in the Arab-Moorish style. Its design is the fruit of the work of the Franche-Comté architect Pierre Marnotte and is one of the rare synagogues of this style in Europe. The building has been listed as a historical monument since December 16, 1984.

=== Cemeteries ===
The first Jewish cemetery in Besançon dates from the end of the Middle Ages, and was located at the time near the Montrapon-Fontaine-Écu district. Named Calmoutier Cemetery, it was finally sold by the municipality in 1465. The community decided at the end of the 18th century to build a new cemetery on the outskirts of the city, near the Bregille district. It remains unclear what happened to the city's old Jewish cemetery, although the most plausible thesis is that the graves were moved to the new cemetery.

The current cemetery hosts imposing tombs, such as those of the Weil family, the Veil-Picard family, the Haas family and Mayer Lippman. The place also has a monument to the dead at its entrance, dedicated to the memory of the members of the Besançon Jewish community killed in action during the First World War.

=== Castle of the Jewess ===
Built in the 18th century, the Château de la Juive owes its name to the fact that it belonged for a long time to a Jewish family in the city, the Lipmann family. Mayer Lippman (then known to be the wealthiest Jew in town) made the building his country home, and decorated and furnished it lavishly. Married to Babette Levy, he had four children: Alfred, Auguste, Nathalie and Dina. The latter died after giving birth in 1827 to Reine Précieuse Léonie Allegri, called "the Jewess" (la Juive), and who left this nickname to the home - while she referred to herself more elegantly with the expression "Lady of Clementigney."

== See also ==
=== Other articles ===
- Islam in Besançon
- History of Jews in France and Judaism
- Timeline of Besançon
- Immigration to Besançon
- History of watchmaking in Besançon
- History of Besançon

=== External links ===
- Judaicultures.info, on the life of Jews in France
- History of the Jews in Alsace
- Besançon – Jewish Virtual Library

=== Bibliography ===
- Magazine Tribune juive, nos. 91 and 92 – special history of the Jewish community of Besançon, 27–2.
- Centenaire du Consistoire Israélite de Besançon, published 9, by J.Berda.
- La synagogue de Besançon, Association cultuelle israélite de Besançon, 1996, 27 pages.
- Antisémitisme en Franche-Comté: de l'affaire Dreyfus à nos jours, Joseph Pinard, 1997, 309 pages.
