= Jewish cemetery, Besançon =

Cemetery in Bourgogne-Franche-Comté, France

Jewish cemetery of Besançon
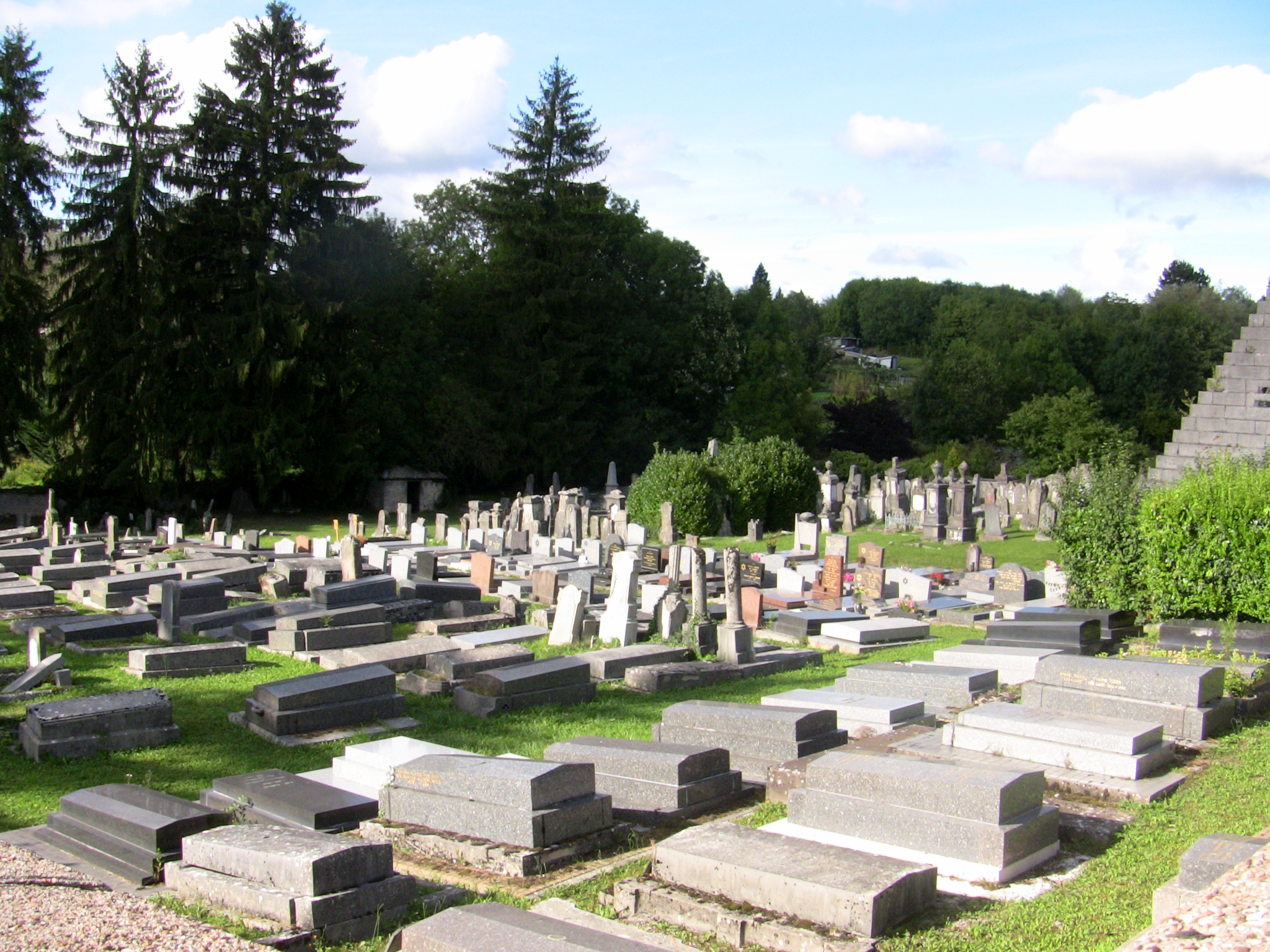
- Interactive map of Jewish cemetery of Besançon

Details
- Established: 1796
- Location: Besançon
- Country: France
- Coordinates: 47°15′21″N 6°02′55″E
- Type: Jewish
- Owned by: Jewish community of Besançon
- Size: 935 m^{2} (10,060 sq ft)
- No. of graves: 600 (est.)
- No. of interments: 600 (est.)
- No. of cremations: 0

The Jewish cemetery of Besançon (French: Cimetière juif de Besançon) is located in the French city of Besançon. It is the only Jewish cemetery in the département of Doubs.

== History ==
The Jewish cemetery of Besançon is located on Anne Frank street, between the Bregille and Palente areas, in the northwest part of the city. The older part of the cemetery was procured by two notaries of the Jewish community of Besançon, in 1796. In 1839 the cemetery was expanded. The earliest graves date from 1849, and the cemetery is still in use. At the entrance of the cemetery a memorial commemorates the members of the Jewish community of Besançon killed during the First World War. Today the cemetery holds between 400 and 600 graves, in an area measuring about 935 m^{2}.

== Gallery ==
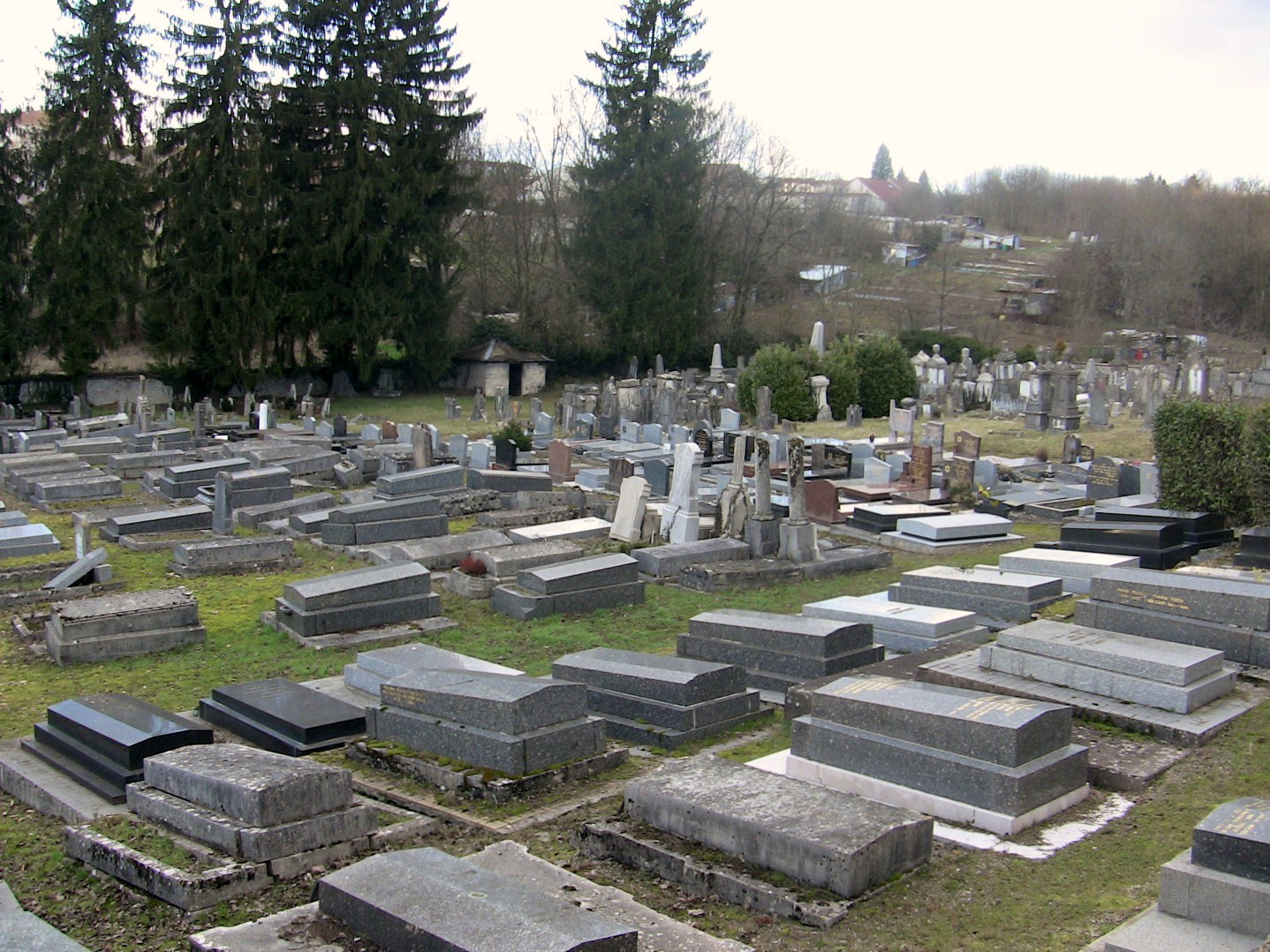
General view of the cemetery.

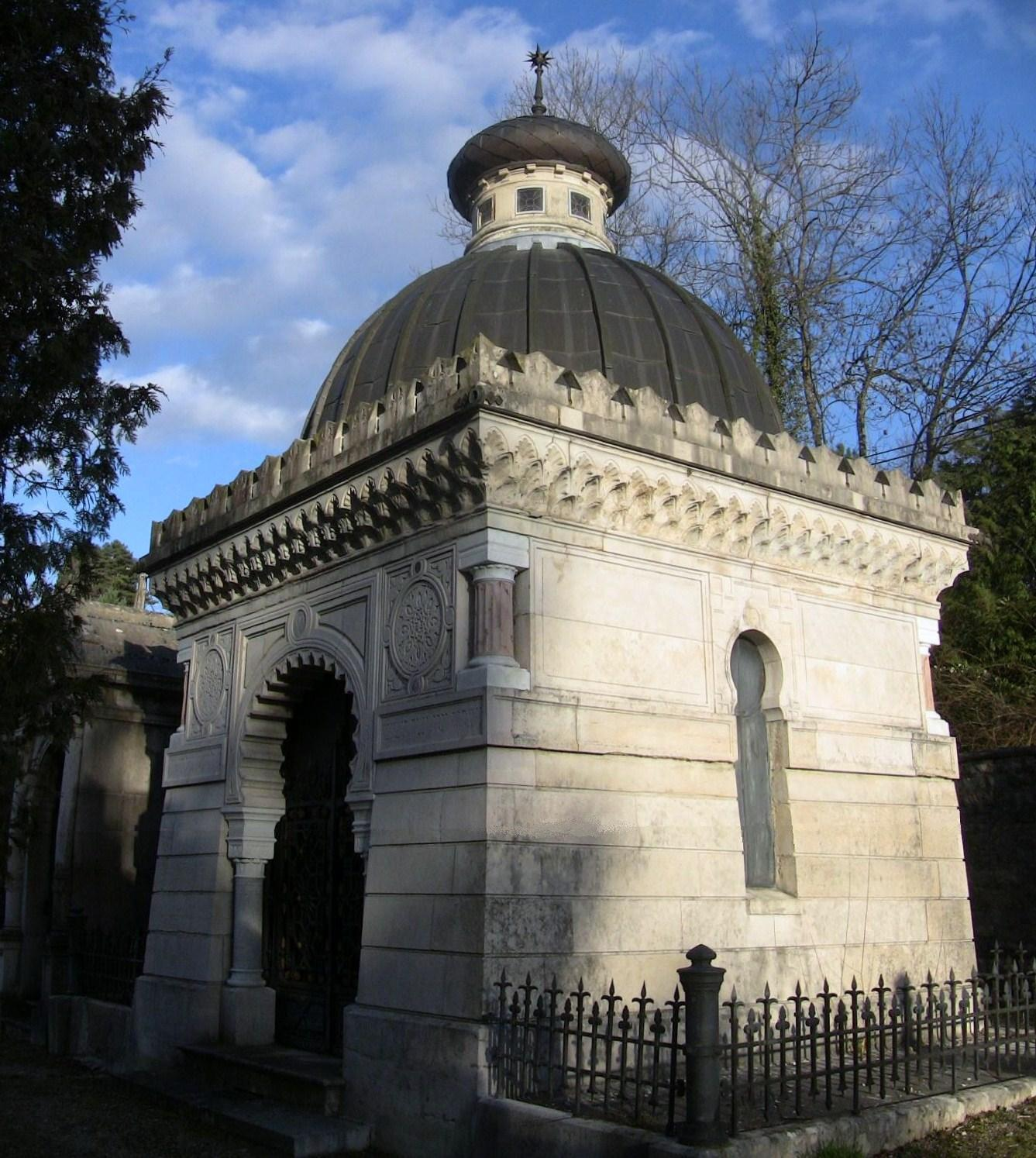
A mausoleum.

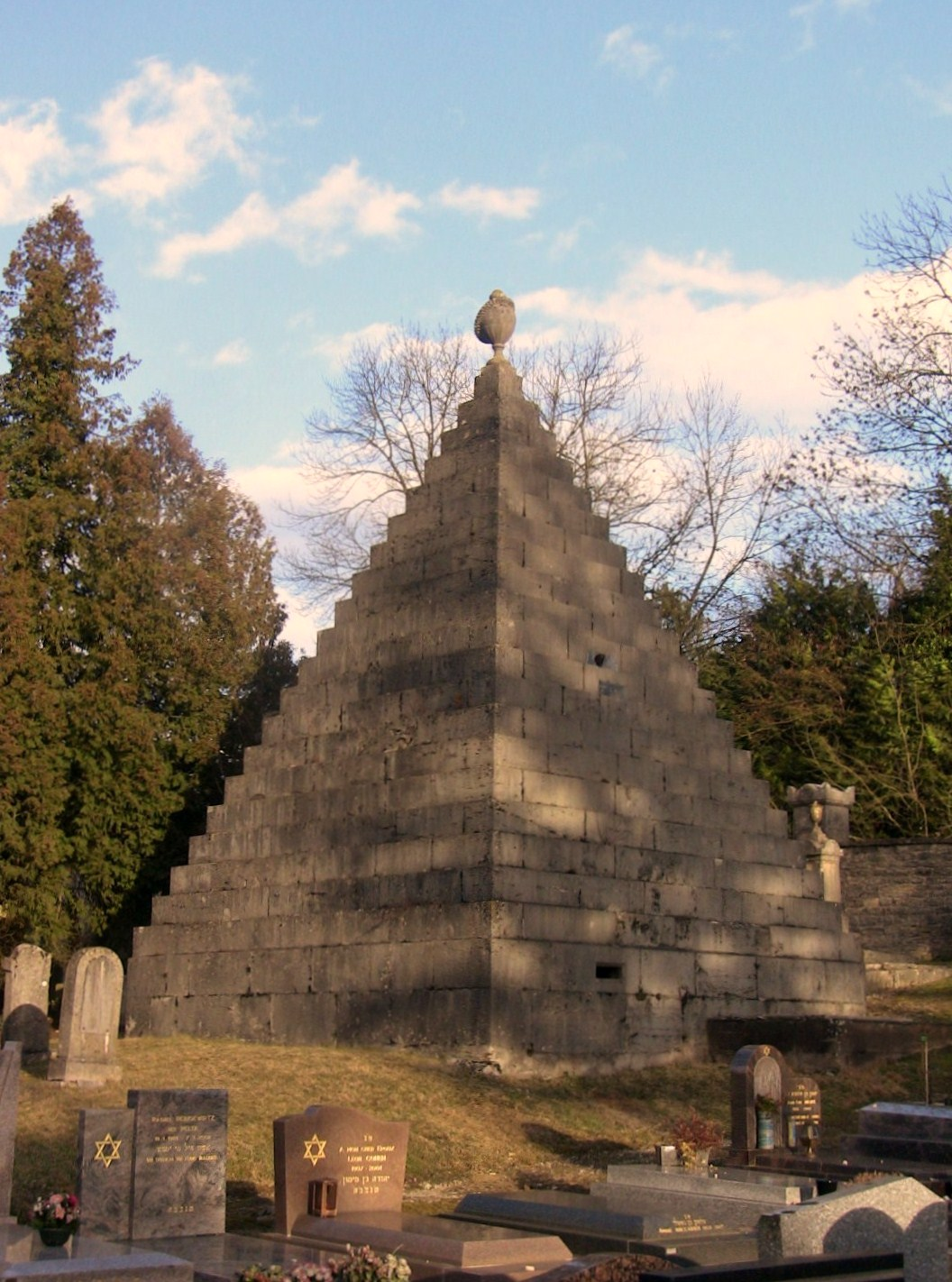
A "pyramidal tomb".

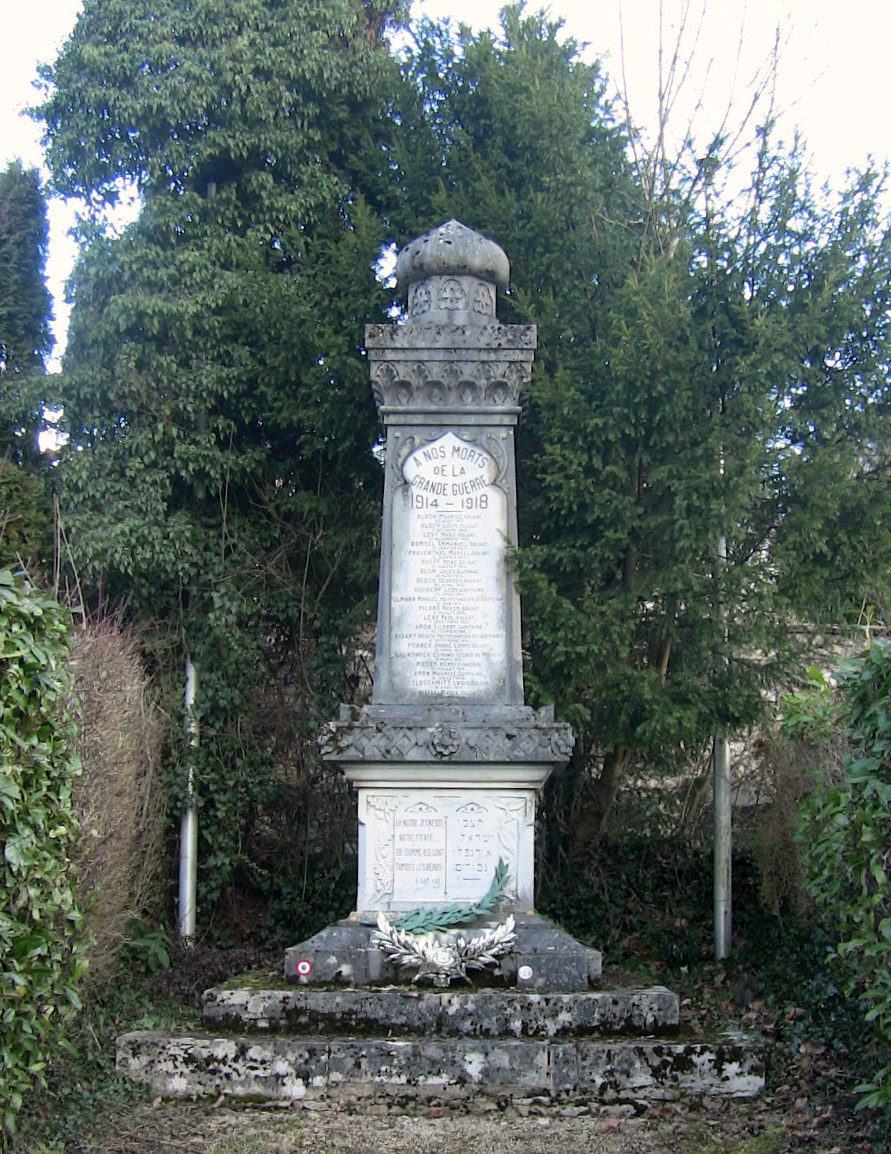
War memorial.

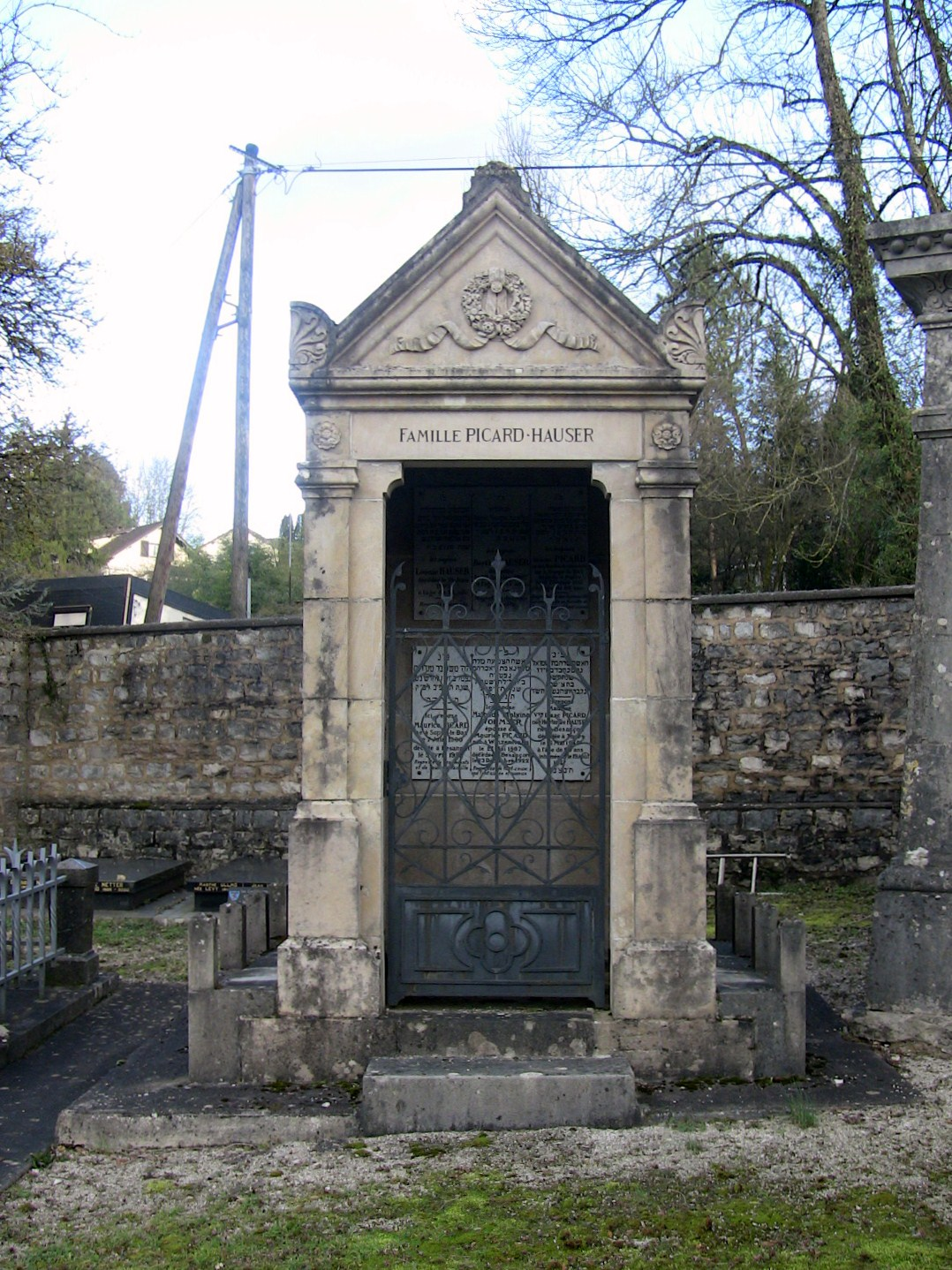
Tomb of the Picard-Hauser family.

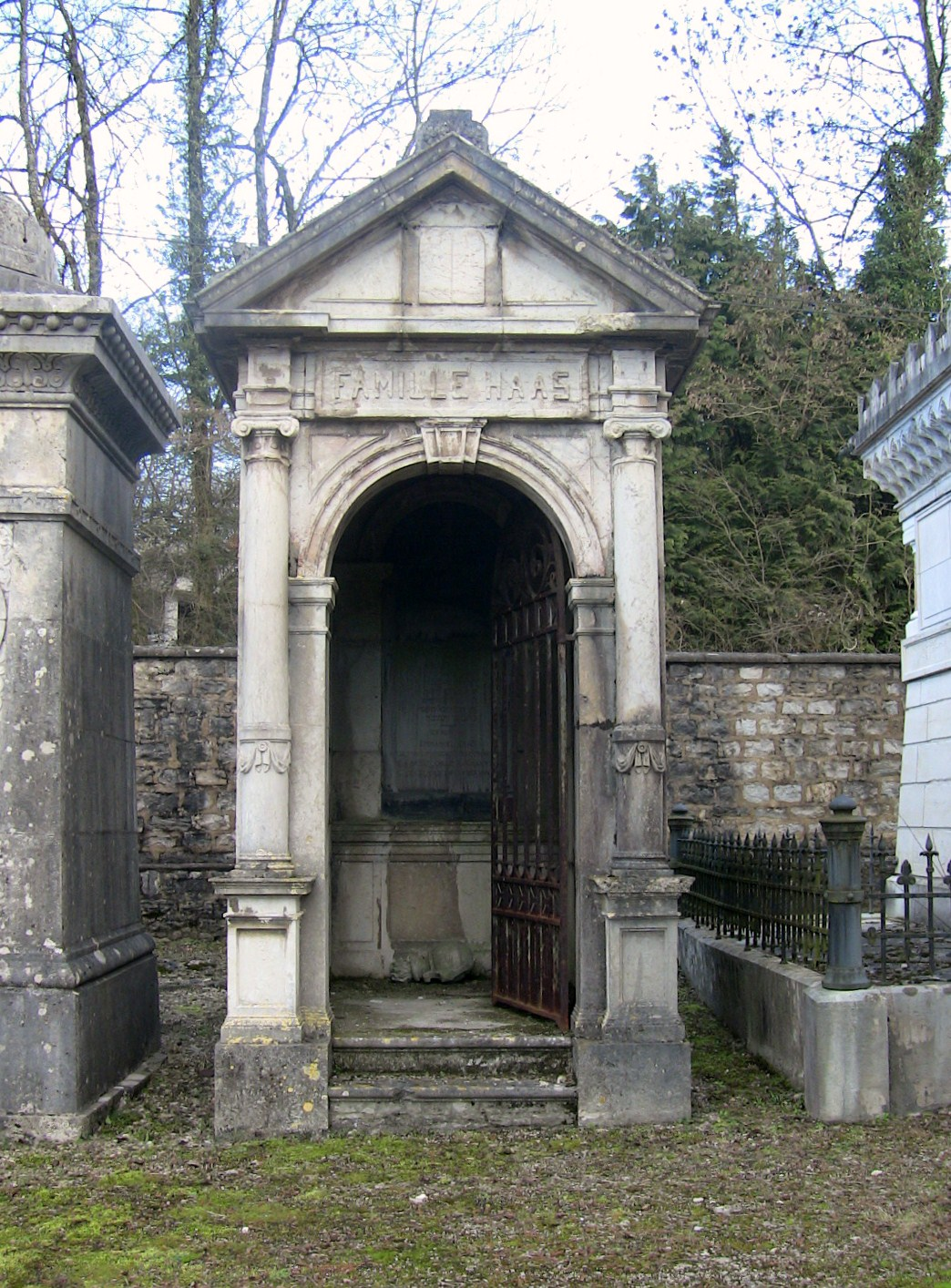
Tomb of the Haas family.

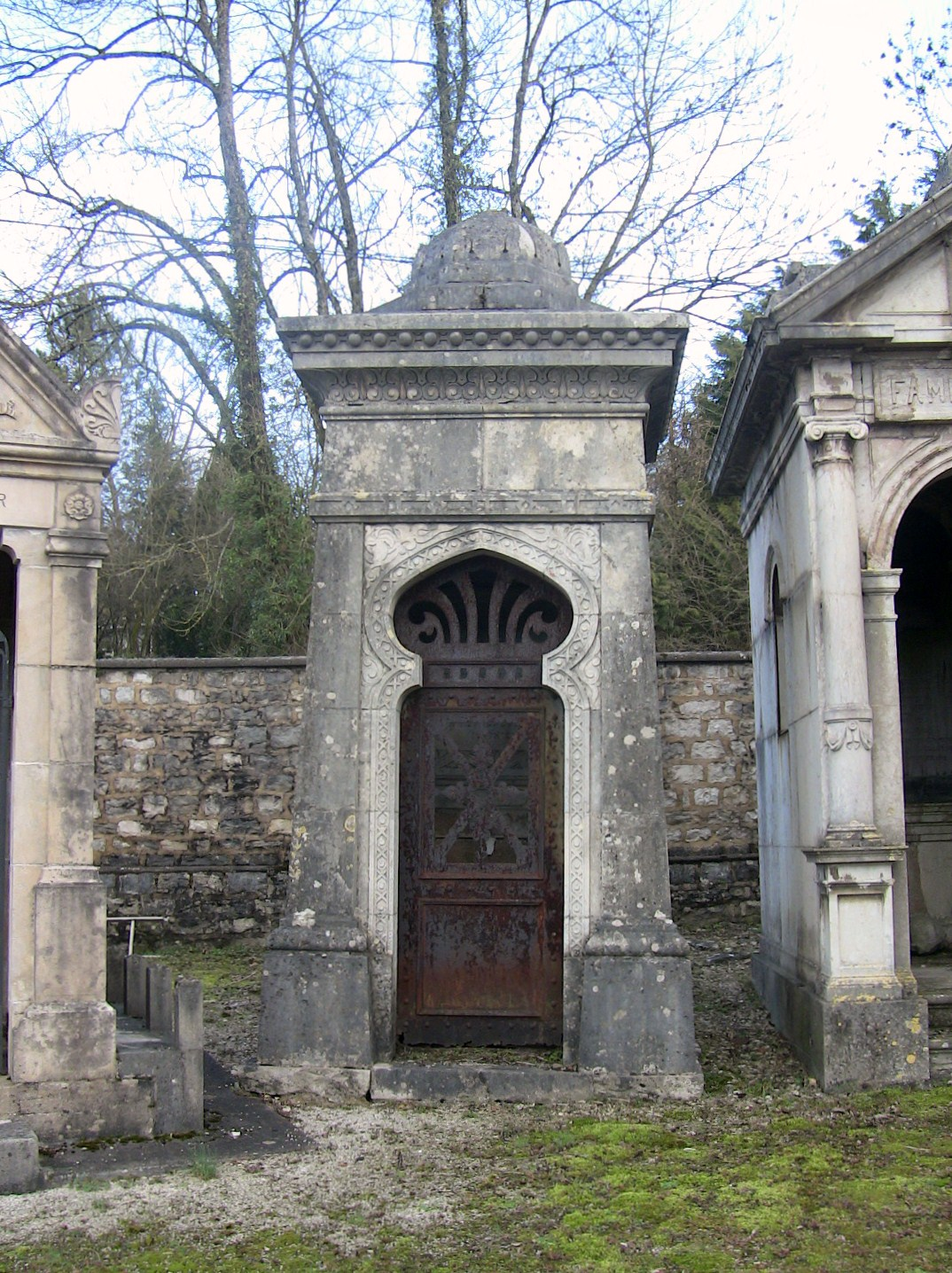
A tomb.

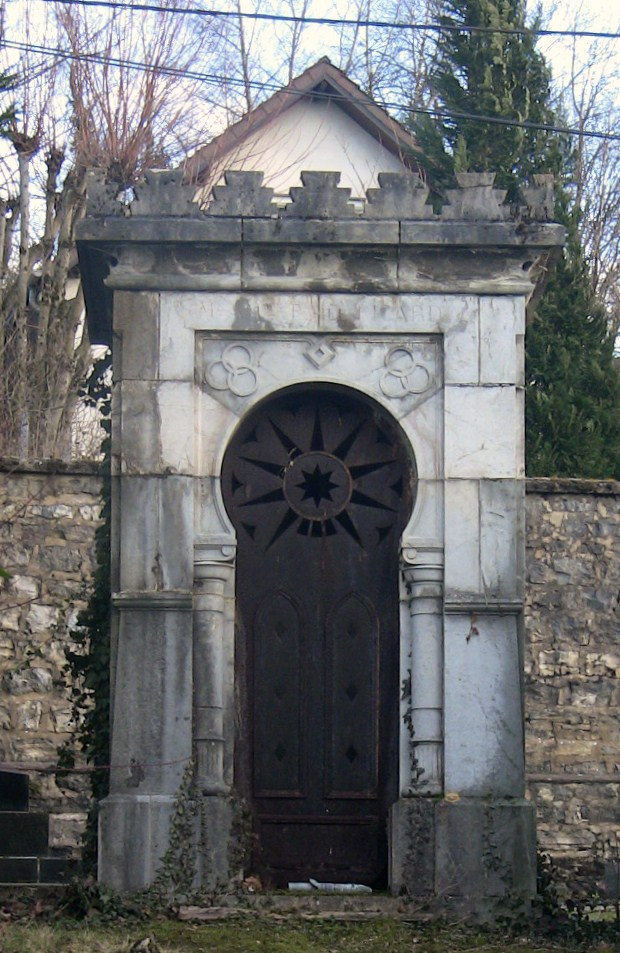
A tomb.

== See also ==
- Synagogue of Besançon
- History of the Jews in Besançon
