= Église de la Madeleine (Besançon) =

Church in Besancon, France

Coordinates: 47°14′24″N 6°1′9″E

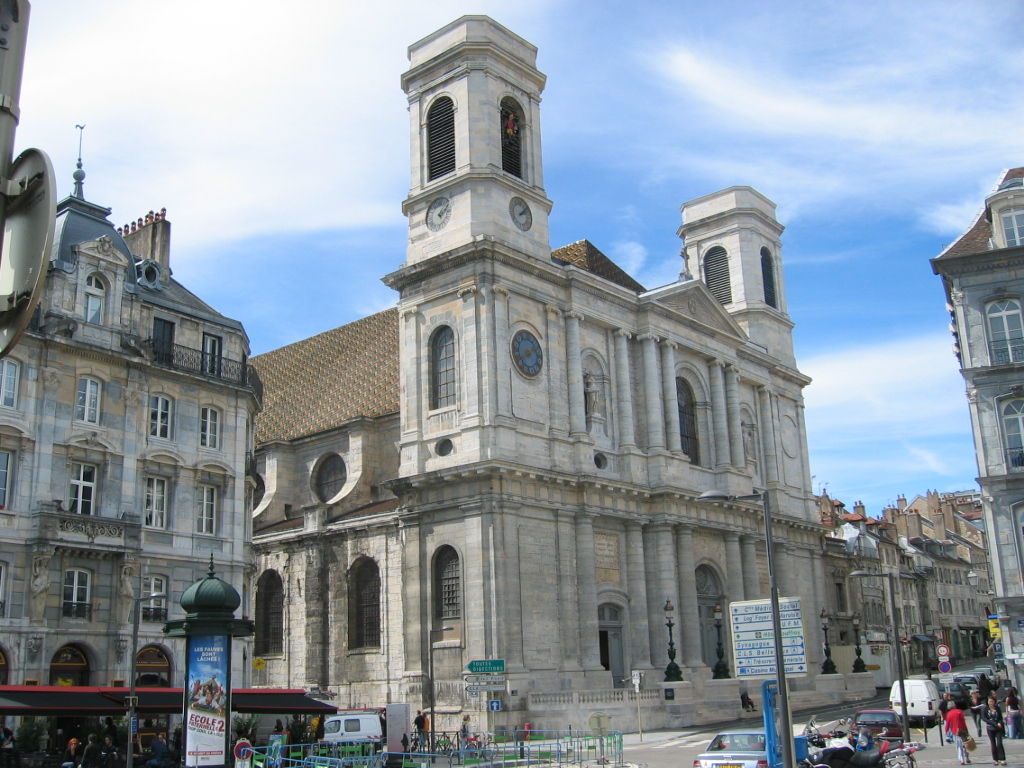

The église Sainte-Madeleine is a neoclassical 18th century hall church in the Battant district of Besançon, France, dedicated to Saint Mary Magdalene. Antoine-Pierre II de Grammont, the archbishop of Besançon, had it built from 1746 to 1766 to plans by the architect Nicolas Nicole.
