= Synagogue of Besançon =

Synagogue located in Besançon, France

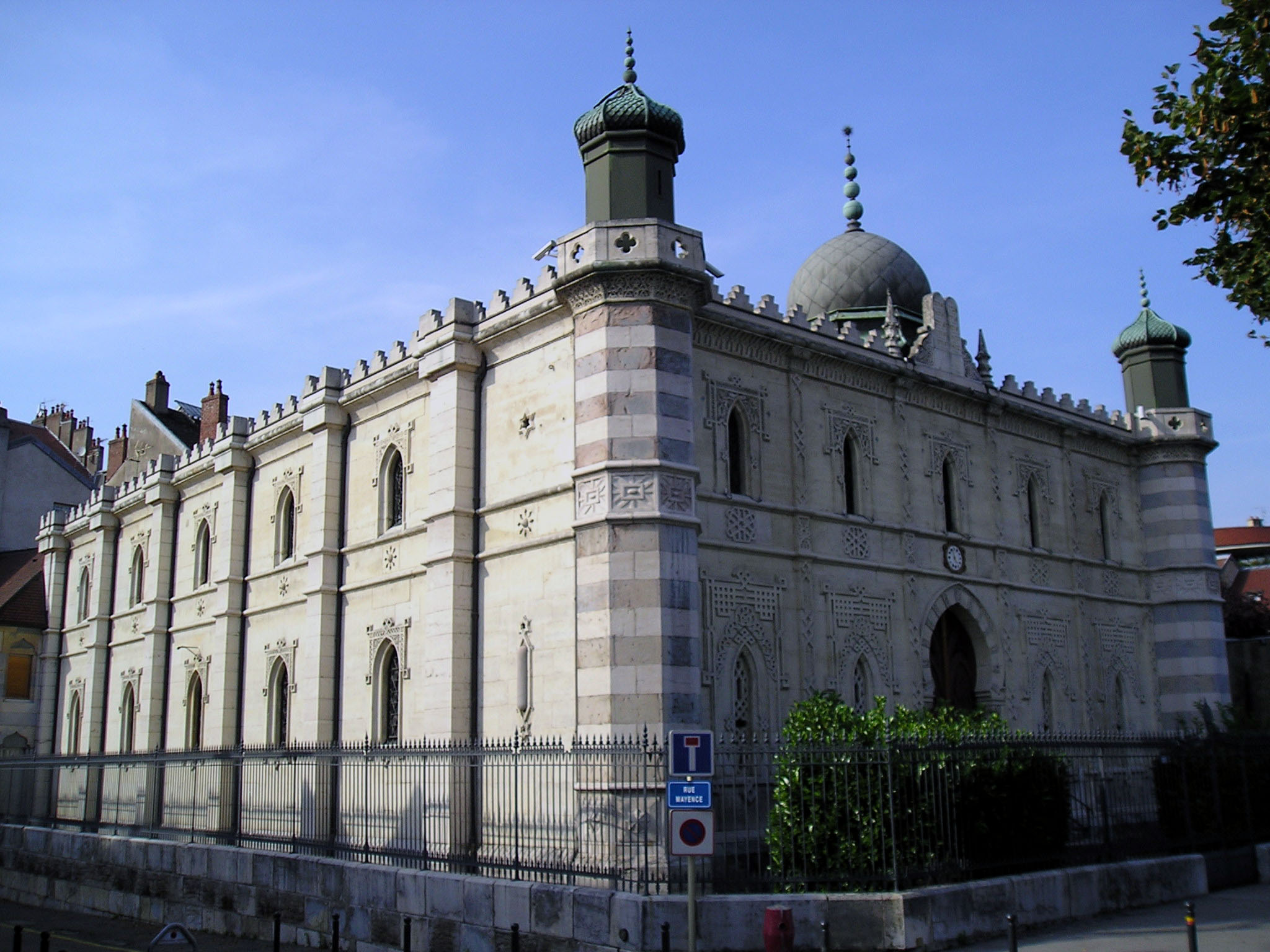
- The synagogue in 2006

- Location of the synagogue in France

Religion
- Affiliation: Judaism
- Rite: Nusach Ashkenaz
- Ecclesiastical or organizational status: Synagogue
- Status: Active

Location
- Location: 23 Quai de Strasbourg, Battant, Besançon, Bourgogne-Franche-Comté
- Country: France
- Interactive map of Synagogue of Besançon
- Coordinates: 47°14′26″N 6°01′15″E

Architecture
- Architect: Pierre Marnotte
- Type: Synagogue architecture
- Style: Moorish Revival
- Established: 1807 (as a congregation)
- Completed: 1870
- Materials: Stone

Monument historique
- Official name: Synagogue
- Type: Base Mérimée
- Designated: 16 November 1984
- Reference no.: PA00101610

The Synagogue of Besançon is a Jewish congregation and synagogue, located at 23 Quai de Strasbourg, in the Battant area, near the old part of town, in the city of Besançon, in the Bourgogne-Franche-Comté region of France. The stone synagogue was built in 1869 and was inaugurated on 18 November.

A Jewish community formed in Free Imperial City of Besançon in the 14th century, after the expulsion of Jews from the Kingdom of France, but was forced to leave shortly thereafter. It did not reestablish itself until shortly after the French Revolution, in 1807. The congregation built its first synagogue on Rue de la Madeleine, in the Battant district in 1831. However, it proved too small for the growing congregation.

An Imperial Decree dated 22 May 1867 authorized the community to acquire land on the Quai Napoléon. The community then entrusted the local architect Pierre Marnotte with the commission to design a building "in the Moroccan style". The building was listed as a monument historiques on 16 November 1984.

== See also ==
- History of the Jews in Besançon
- History of the Jews in France
- List of synagogues in France
