= Velocite Bikes =

Taiwanese bicycle manufacturer

Velocite Tech. Co Ltd
- Type: Private company
- Industry: Bicycles
- Founded: 2008
- Founder: Victor Major
- Headquarters: Kaohsiung, Taiwan
- Key people: Victor Major, CEO
- Products: Bicycles and related components
- Website: www.velocite-bikes.com

Velocite Bikes is a Taiwanese manufacturer of racing bicycles, mountain bike frames, bicycle wheels and other bicycle components. Notable collaboration partners include the National Cheng Kung University, National Center for High-Performance Computing, Oxeon and Acer Inc. Velocite specializes in carbon fiber composite products, but also manufactures bicycle frames and components using aluminium alloys. Its core bicycle frame models include the road bike frames "Magnus", "Geos", "Selene" and mountain bike frames "Flux", and "Flux Alloy". The firm is also one of the few manufacturers of full carbon road tubeless wheels, the "Velocite RT50". The firm have been sponsoring the UK based Matrix Fitness Racing Academy women's cycling team since 2012.

== History ==
Velocite Bikes was founded in 2008 by the present CEO Victor Major. Prior to starting the brand, Major ran and managed Cycle Taiwan for 2 years. Cycle Taiwan was a cycling community website for English speakers. focussed on providing riding and equipment information for English speaking riders during the time in Taiwan before cycling for sport, or recreation were popular. At that time it was the only active English language cycling website in Taiwan. Seeing the opportunity for racing bicycle production, he launched Velocite Bikes with four original carbon fiber bicycle frame models; "Velocite Helios", "Velocite Magnus", "Velocite Isoflow" and "Velocite Flux", and a line of carbon fiber wheels, "Velocite Noir".

In 2015 Velocite released the world's first composite rims made using filament winding and launched a new OEM brand, Venn. The Venn Rev 35 wheels series (TCC - rim brake specific tubeless clincher, TCD - disc brake specific tubeless clincher and TUC - rim brake specific tubular) made with the rims manufactured by filament winding technology received a 2015 Taipei Cycle d&i Award, 2015 Eurobike Award and the inaugural 2017 Velofollies Flanders Bike Valley Innovation Award.

In 2016 Velocite BVBA was set up in Belgium at the newly opened Flanders Bike Valley facility. Velocite BVBA serves as a distribution and R&D center for Venn and Velocite products for European and pan European markets.

== Patent dispute with Cicli Pinarello ==
In January 2017, Velocite accused Cicli Pinarello of taking the patented and copyrighted original research performed by Velocite dealing with integration of a round water bottle into the airflow through use of a concave downtube. Velocite developed the aerodynamic solution during 2014 and launched the Velocite Syn aero road bike featuring the concave downtube at the 2015 Taipei Cycle Show. Pinarello released the Bolide TT bicycle featuring the concave downtube over a year later in May 2016 and a Dogma F10 bicycle in January 2017. The Dogma F10 marketing information also makes use of the Velocite Syn wind tunnel data. At the time of launch of the Dogma F10, Pinarello did not present any wind tunnel, or simulation results data that indicates independent work. Pinarello disputed the rights of Velocite to the aerodynamically functional concave downtube design and associated airflow data, insisting that they have the right to incorporate the design into their bicycle designs and use the data in their marketing materials.
