= Avrigney-Virey =

- Commune
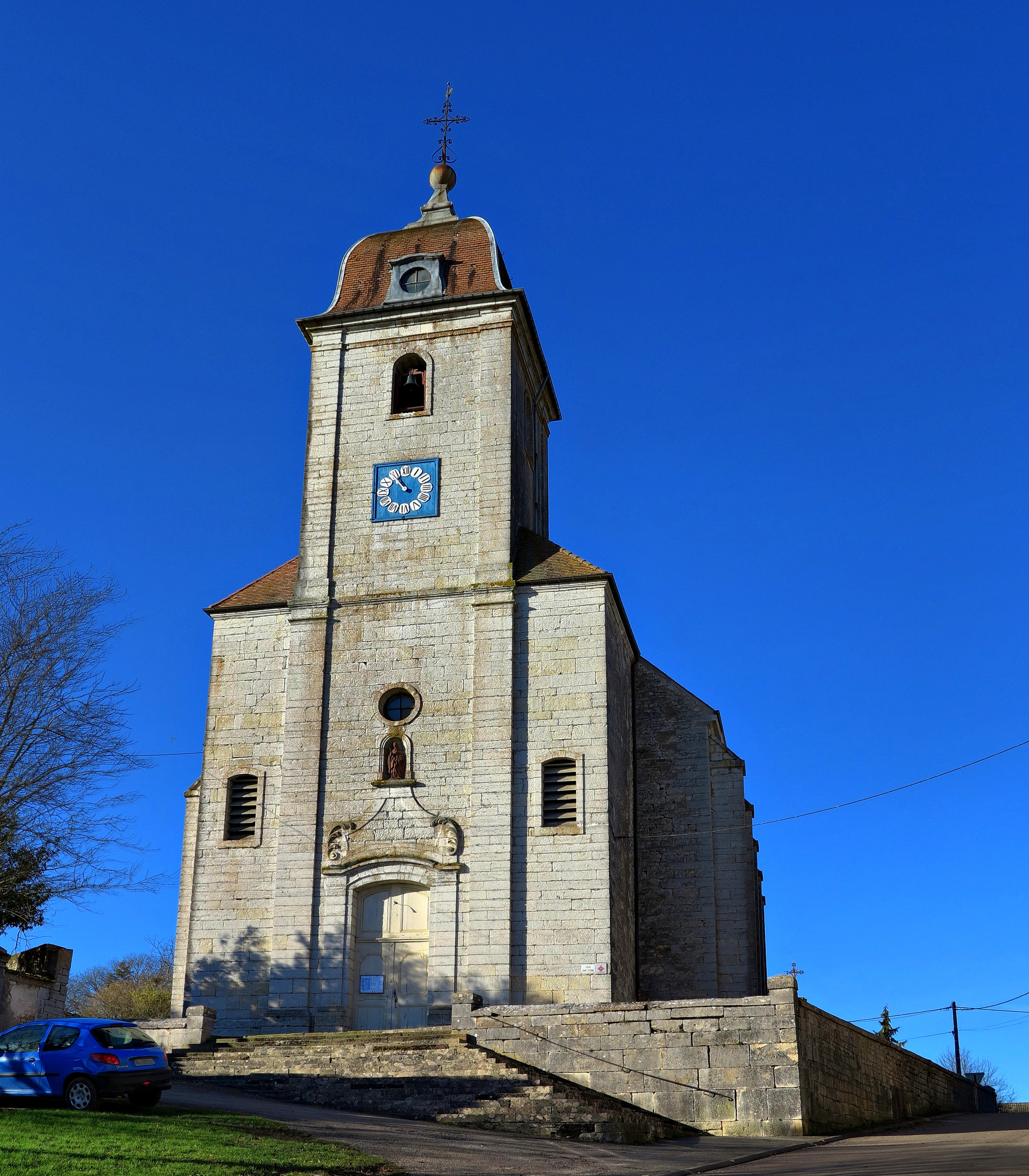
- The church in Avrigney

- Coat of arms
- Location of Avrigney-Virey
- Location within France Location within Bourgogne-Franche-Comté
- Coordinates: 47°20′07″N 5°46′46″E
- Country: France
- Region: Bourgogne-Franche-Comté
- Department: Haute-Saône
- Arrondissement: Vesoul
- Canton: Marnay
- Intercommunality: CC Val Marnaysien

Government
  - Mayor (2020–2026): Gérard Creux
- Area^{1}: 22.30 km^{2} (8.61 sq mi)
- Highest elevation: 355 m (1,165 ft)
- Lowest elevation: 230 m (750 ft)
- Population (2023): 428
  - Density: 19.2/km^{2} (49.7/sq mi)
- Time zone: UTC+01:00 (CET)
  - Summer (DST): UTC+02:00 (CEST)
- INSEE/Postal code: 70045 /70150
- ^{1} French Land Register data, which excludes lakes, ponds, glaciers > 1 km^{2} (0.386 sq mi or 247 acres) and river estuaries.

Avrigney-Virey (French pronunciation: [avʁiɲɛ viʁɛ]) is a commune in the Haute-Saône department in the region of Bourgogne-Franche-Comté in eastern France. It was created in 1973 by the merger of two former communes: Avrigney and Virey.

== See also ==
- Communes of the Haute-Saône department
