= Battant (Besançon) =

Coordinates: 47°14′26″N 6°1′10″E

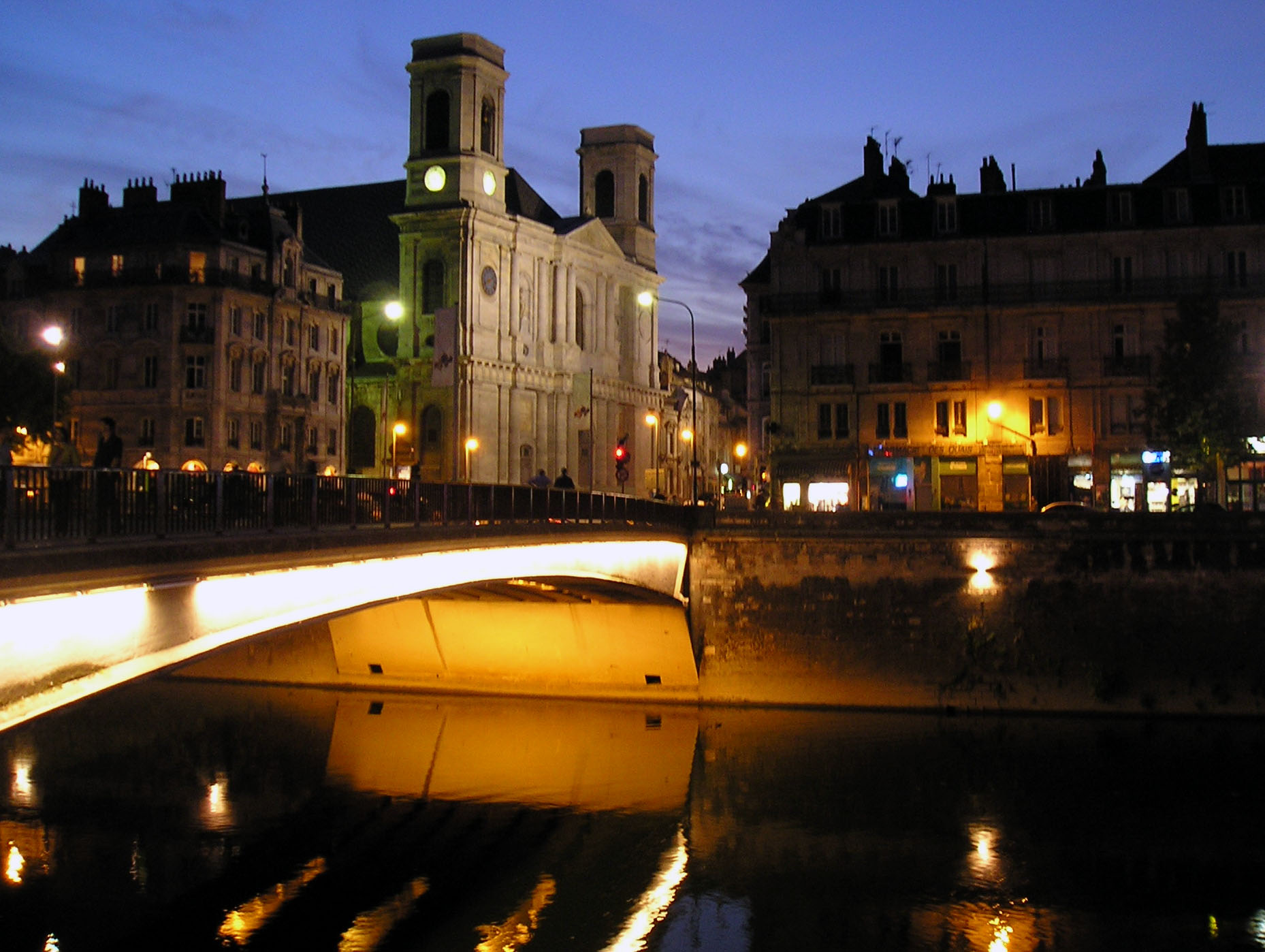
Battant bridge and the church, 2007.

Battant is one of the oldest parts of Besançon, Doubs, France, and has been under architectural protection since 1964. It is situated on the right bank of the river Doubs, north of the ox-bow that encircles the center of the city. A bridge across the Doubs joins the two quarters Battant and La Boucle (The Oxbow), via the Vauban quay and Jouffroy d'Abbans Place.

Today, Battant has become a district with a diverse population, numbering about 4,200 people. It is one of the more lively quarters of the city because of its numerous small shops, its nightlife, and its market.

The quarter's name appears to have come from the Mouillère, a small brook also known as the fons batenti (river of the beater) because the water from the brook drove a cloth-beating device. The name came to be applied to a nearby street, and then by extension to the entire quarter. The inhabitants of Battant are known as Bousbots, which recalls the resistance that the grape growers of the district gave to the attempted seizure of the city by the Huguenots of Montbéliard on the night of 20–21 June 1575.

== History ==
For centuries, a Roman bridge between Battant and Besançon provided the only access to the city proper. Consequently, since Gallo-Roman times a faubourg developed around the Battant end of the bridge. By the twelfth century the quarter came to have its own wall. The population of the quarter consisted of grape growers, workers, and washerwomen, though grape growing remained the principal economic activity in the quarter until the end of the nineteenth century.

== Monuments ==
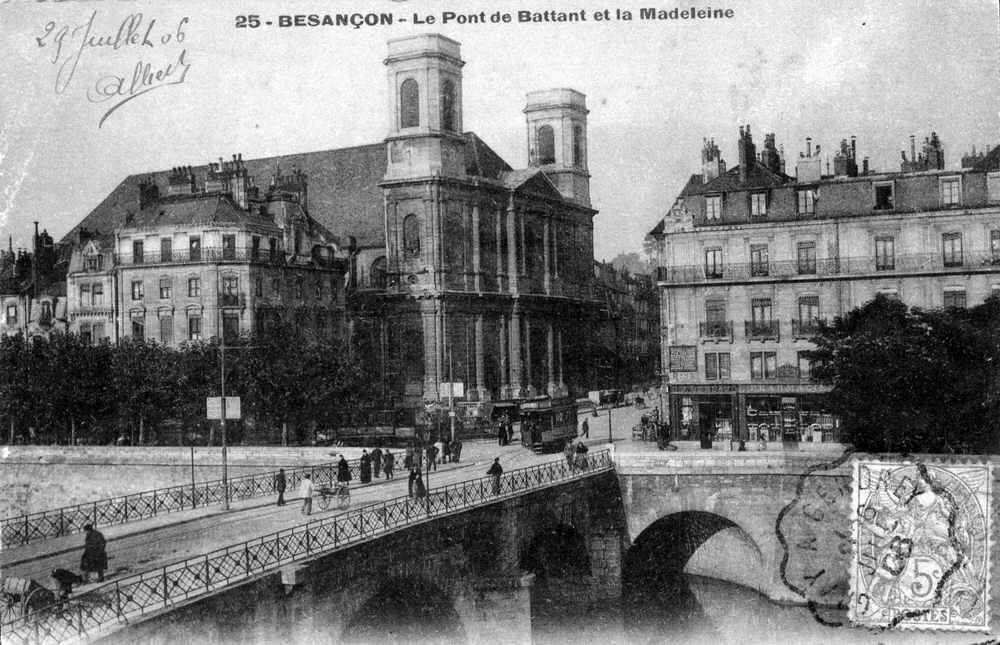
The Battant Bridge and the Church of La Madelaine:postcard dating to July 1906.

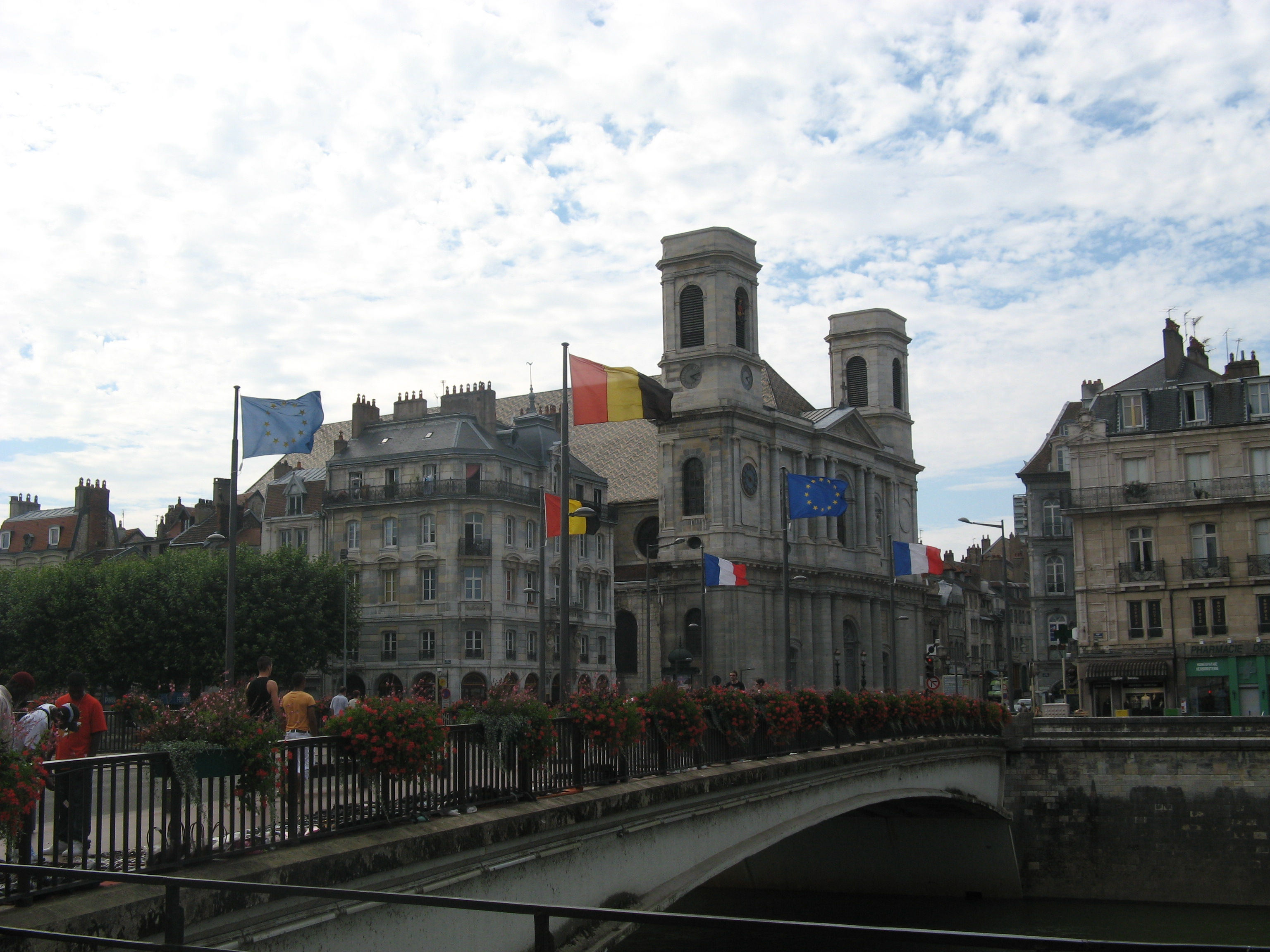
The Battant bridge with the flags of Besançon, France, and Europe, August 2007.

The quarter has a rich architectural history. Since 1964 some 31 hectares have been under an architectural protection order.

- Pont Battant: Originally this was an ancient Roman stone bridge with five arches and a width of about 4 metres. For long times it was the only bridge over the river Doubs. During the Middle Ages and renaissance the bridge was repaired and modified several times. At the beginning of the 20th century, the Pont Battant consisted of the main three arches, the river Doubs flew through, a small arch at the old town river bank and an even sized arch at Battant quarter end that was actually a 90 degree tunnel, beginning under the riverside Promenade heading through the arch (that days under a street crossing; see postcard dating 1906) and ending under the Promenade on the other side. Unfortunately the bridge was partially destroyed during World War II and restored as a provisional solution. The replacement bridge, built in 1953 in concrete, had only a single arch, the design being intended to reduce the risk of flooding, like the January 1910 Doubs river flood. The bridge was often the site of an informal market where one may buy things from Sub-Saharan Africa due to its deck of 60 x 17 metres. After 60 years the concrete bridge had to be replaced. At 10. March 2012 Besançon city organized an event that ends up with the symbolic burning down the Pont Battant. The bridge was shut in April. Disassembling began in May. A pedestrian bridge was built on an interim basis. This temporary bridge was deconstructed, when 20. June 2013 the new bridge partially opened for those walking footpaths and for bicyclists only. The new Pont Battant was tested to take the weight of 400 tons, although it will have to withstand a calculated max weight of 160 tons. It passed the test at 28. October 2013. The first tram, named after the French writer "Victor Hugo", crossed the new Pont Battant 15 January 2014. The new bridge has a single arch made of 1,100 tons of steel filled with 800 tons of concrete. It spreads 60 metres (the bridge segment is 65 metres), at a width of 24 metres and costs 7 million Euros. On the surface a mixture of resin and sand was spray coated. The immense width is needed to provide enough space for the 90 degrees curved rails for trams and a wide sidewalk. Until now (March 2014) several love locks were installed at the steel wire net of the railings. The first love locks were seen a few months before the reconstruction ended 30. November 2013.
- Remains of a Roman arena: The Romans constructed the arena in the first century (CE) for the town of Vesontio (now Besançon), just as they constructed comparable arenas in Arles and Nîmes. The arena could seat 24,000 people, and measured 130 by 106 meters, with a height of 21 meters. Little remains of the arena as during the Middle Ages and after it served as a virtual quarry for the growing town. The Church of the Madeleine, the twelfth century Hôpital Saint-Jacques, as well as Besançon's Vauban fortifications all were built in part of stone from the arena.

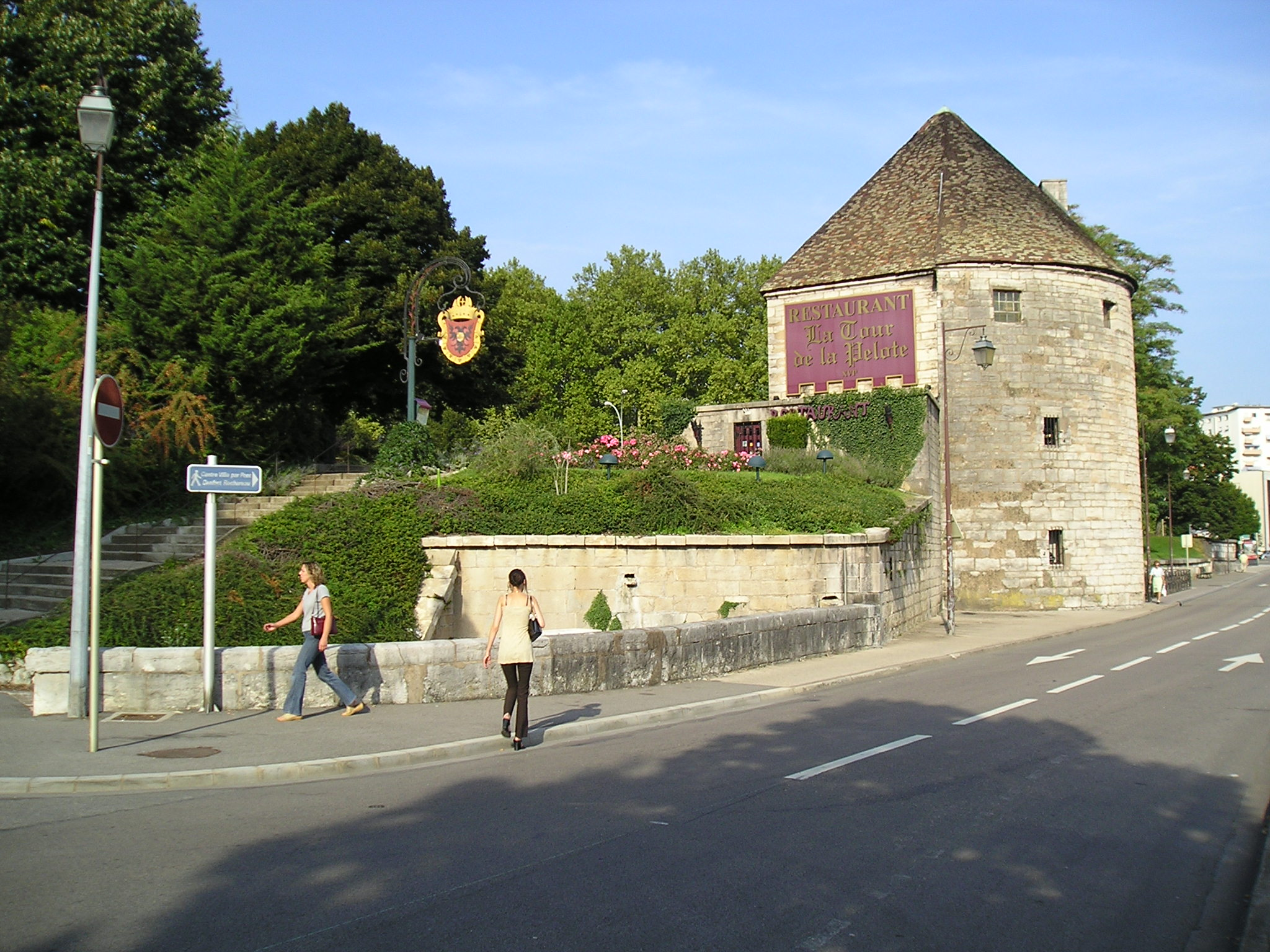
Pelote Tower.

- Pelote (Pelotte) Tower: This stone tower dates to 1475 and was part of the city of Besançon's fortifications. It sits on the Strasbourg Quay at the point where the Mouillère meets the Doubs. The tower owes its name to Pierre Pillot, Seigneur de Chenecey, who bought the land on which the tower sits. When Vauban received the commission to improve the city's defenses, he decided to incorporate the tower, after extensive modification, into his design, rather than destroy it. In 1942 the tower was declared a historical monument. It now houses a restaurant.
- Montmart Tower: The tower is also known as the Battant Tower and the Square Tower. It was built in 1526. As in the case of the Pelote Tower, Vauban decided to incorporate the Montmart Tower into the city's fortifications.

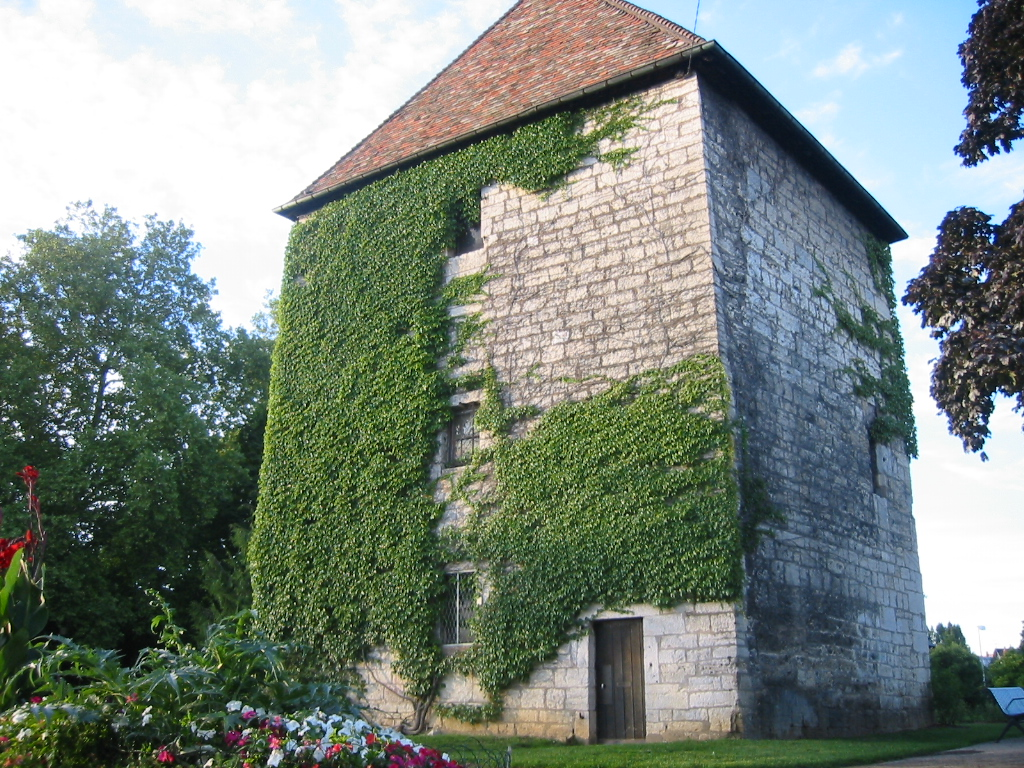
Montmart Tower.

- Ramparts constructed by Vauban
- The House of the Wood Beams dates to the 15th century and is reputed to be the oldest house in Besançon.
- Fort Griffon
- Hôtel de Champagney and its interior court
- Église Sainte-Madeleine
- The Bacchus Fountain, which the municipality erected in 1457. The statue of Bacchus dates to 1579 and is the work of the sculptor Lullier.
- Hôtel de Jouffroy. From the sixteenth century, this was the home of the ancestors of Jouffroy d'Abbans, inventor of steam navigation.
- Besancon's synagogue: This dates to 1860 and is constructed in a Moorish style.
- Former public baths in the Art Deco style, dating to 1911
- A wine grower's house, dating from the fifteenth to the seventeenth century.

== Transport ==
- Bus, number 3, 5, 31, 32.
