= Christianity in Besançon =

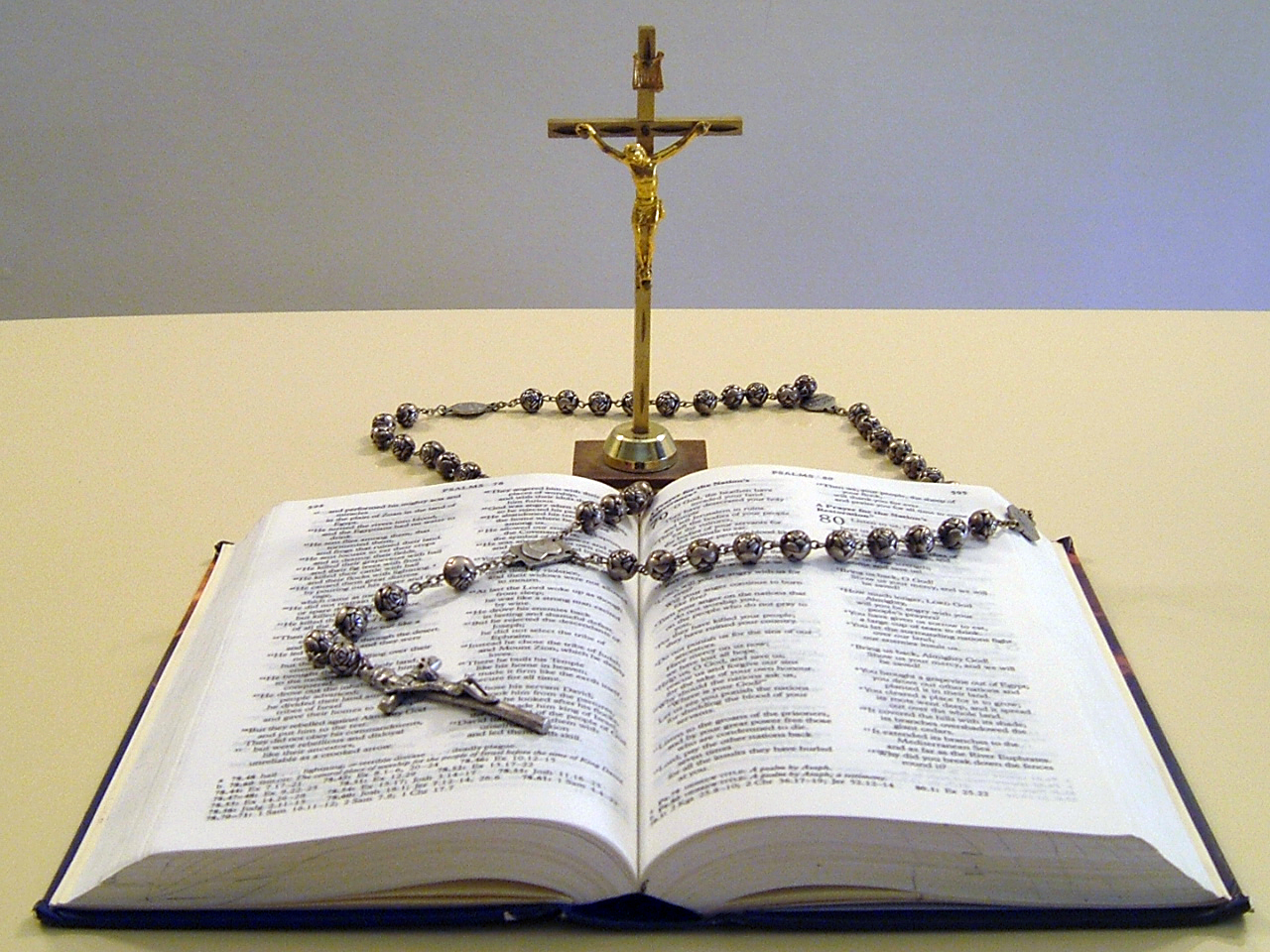
The Bible, one of the pillars of Christianity.

Christianity in Besançon appeared in the 3rd century, a period during which, according to tradition, the martyrs Ferrutio and Ferreolus evangelized the city and its region. However, the torture and assassination of these two figures of Franc-Comtois Christianity are today considered by some historians as an invention of late antiquity, with the former Sequania Gallo-Roman gradually converting to Christianity only from the 4th century onwards. The first mention of a bishop of the city dates back to 346, but documents mention religious figures in office in the Comtois capital as early as the mid-3rd century, when the first Franc-Comtois church was probably built on the site of the current Cathedral of Saint John.

Other buildings were constructed subsequently and up to the 18th century, such as the Église Saint-Maurice de Besançon, the Église Notre-Dame de Besançon, or the Abbaye Saint-Paul de Besançon. In the 18th century, the Église de la Madeleine, the Église Saint-Pierre de Besançon, and many other chapels and churches were built.

Today, the Archdiocese of Besançon comprises 67 parishes (or pastoral units), grouped into 13 deaneries representing 1,010 communes. Currently, Besançon, like many other French and European cities, is experiencing a decline in church attendance rates and the number of practicing faithful within its Christian community.

== History ==
=== Sequani ===
The Sequani were one of the Gallic peoples of eastern Gaul, who opposed their neighbors, the Aedui, to the southwest. If the Saône appears in the writings of Caesar under the name Arar, it is likely that the term sequana is the primitive name of the river (the same form also being the origin of the name of the Seine). Etymologically, the Sequani are named "those of the goddess Sequana" or "those of the Seine", which does not necessarily imply that they occupied the banks of this river before the population movements of the 3rd century BC, especially since the name "Seine" perhaps designated more the deity than the river consecrated to her: Su-ik-wana in Celtic means "the good source (or giver) of water", as opposed to Ik-wana, which gave "Yonne", which is not qualified as "good".

=== Early Christianity in Franche-Comté ===
According to tradition, particularly reported by Gregory of Tours, the evangelization of Franche-Comté is due to Saint Ferrutio and his brother Saint Ferreolus, sent on a mission by Irenaeus of Lyon. Following their unexpected success, the first mother church, the current Cathedral of Saint John, was allegedly founded at the heart of a future capitular district in Besançon. However, historians today do not recognize the historicity of this account. Thus, according to Yves Jeannin, the holy martyrs of Besançon, Ferreolus and Ferrutio, are likely an invention by Bishop Amantius and his entourage around 500 to meet the aspirations of their time.

After Constantine's conversion, a diocese was formed in the course of the 4th century, bishops were appointed, and churches were built throughout Franche-Comté, particularly in Besançon. This marked the expansion of Christianity in Franche-Comté, a progression that continued for over 17 centuries until the mid-20th century.

==== Saint Ferrutio and Saint Ferreolus ====
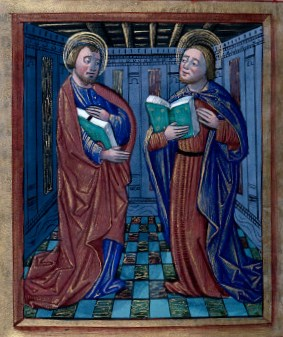
Ferreolus and Ferrutio, illumination from the 15th century.

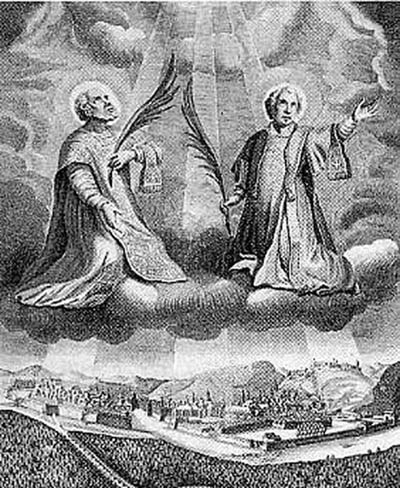
Saint Ferreolus and Saint Ferrutio.

According to tradition, the deacon Ferrutio (or Fargeau) and his brother, or friend, the priest Ferreolus were both natives of Asia Minor and were converted to Christianity by Saint Polycarp, bishop of Smyrna in present-day Turkey, before studying in Athens, Greece. After completing their studies at the end of the 2nd century, they are found in the city of Lyon, France, where the bishop Saint Irenaeus, after ordaining them priest and deacon, sent them to found the Roman Catholic Church of Vesontio ("Besançon" in Latin) and to evangelize the Sequania Gallo-Roman.

They settled in a cave on the current site of the commune of Saint-Ferjeux, from where they conducted their activity for about thirty years, gradually expanding their action before suffering martyrdom and being beheaded on June 10 of a year during the reign of Aurelian according to the account of their passion, on the orders of the Roman governor Claude. The date is sometimes corrected by modern authors to June 10, 212. Martyrologies describe at length the interrogations and tortures to which the two brothers were subjected: their tongues were cut out for continuing to preach their faith, and they were tortured with thirty awls driven into their bodies; they were finally beheaded and buried in their cave. The Roman Claude, who seems to be the governor of Sequania, allegedly ordered the execution of the two evangelizers following his wife's conversion to Christianity, seeing their Christian activities as a source of public disorder.

However, according to tradition, their goal was achieved: Franche-Comté was gradually evangelized, and the Church of Besançon began to organize, notably with the foundation of a mother church, the arrival of priests, and the appointment of bishops. Shortly after the death of Saint Ferrutio and Saint Ferreolus, the Church of Saint-Ferjeux was erected in their honor. The name of the current district of Saint-Ferjeux is undoubtedly due to one of the two saints.

In the 20th century, philological, archaeological, and historical research questioned the veracity of these accounts, which are now considered imaginary. The origins of Christianity in Besançon are in fact obscure, and the earliest accounts of Ferreolus and Ferrutio contain improbabilities: in particular, situating their martyrdom under Aurelian is unlikely for alleged disciples of Irenaeus, who died in 202. The first known bishop of Besançon is Pancharius in 346, and the second is Chelidonius in 444. In the 6th century, the episcopal list expands with Amantius between 487 and 515, Claudius around 517, Urbicus in 549, Tetradius in the 550s-560s, and then Silvester in the 580s, whose epitaph is still visible in the crypt of the Basilica of Saint-Ferjeux. By this time, as testified by Gregory of Tours, the tradition of the martyrs Ferreolus and Ferrutio is well established, and their tomb is reputed to produce miracles. The Passion of Ferreolus and Ferrutio, as a narrative, likely dates from around 500. It is, in fact, a replica of a lost passion of the martyrs of Valence, Felix, Fortunatus of Valence, and Achilleus, who, like Ferreolus and Ferrutio, were considered disciples of Irenaeus. It is imitated by that of Saint Benignus of Dijon.

The Passion of Ferreolus and Ferrutio contains purely local indications: nails driven into the joints of the body - the awls - and decapitation. Around 370, Bishop Anianus allegedly rediscovered the bodies of the two holy martyrs and recognized their martyr status due to the nails embedded in their skulls. Various indications show that the buried individuals belonged to a public cemetery, with the presence of nails referring to funerary practices not related to Christian persecutions and known elsewhere. Notably, at the Viotte cemetery in Besançon. According to Yves Jeannin, the invention of the relics should be attributed to Amantius around 500. In light of the most recent historical research, "it is confirmed that the Passion of Ferreolus and Ferrutio is purely imaginary". The account of the invention of the relics likely refers to realities from the early 6th century, at a time when Christian communities were affirming themselves and establishing a local identity. It is now difficult to determine the stages of the establishment of Christianity in the Besançon region and neighboring areas at the end of antiquity and the beginning of the early Middle Ages. According to L. Joan, "It is generally considered that this new religion, clashing with Gallo-Roman polytheism, was established in Gaul in two successive waves, one at the end of the Roman period through evangelizers like Saint Martin, the other towards the end of the Merovingian period also under the impetus of a new generation of missionaries, foremost among whom is the Irishman Columban". And for Robert Turcan, "The evangelization of the Sequani came from the south and probably through the Rhone corridor, but the paucity of data does not allow for any firm inference".

==== Foundation of the Mother Church ====
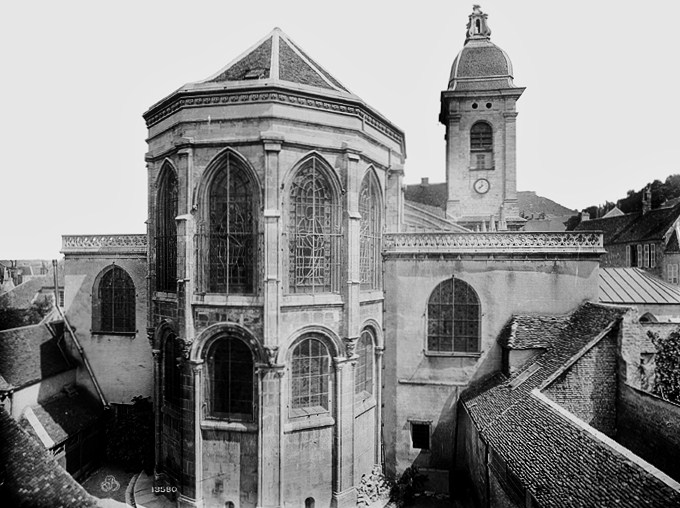
View of the apse and bell tower of the Cathedral of Saint John in 1893.

The first truly known bishop of the city is attested in 346: it is Pancharius, although an episcopal catalog names him in sixth place, placing the first bishop of Besançon, Linus, around the mid-3rd century. The city had a church where the bishops sat, but little information has come down to us from that time; only the testimony of the Roman Emperor Julian in 360 attests to the existence of places of worship: "the city is beautiful and large, adorned with magnificent temples". Another piece of evidence supports the hypothesis of a Roman church: a sounding of the building dating from 1863 carried out near the top of the nave reveals the presence of "enormous stones from Vergenne that seem to have served as foundations for Roman buildings". This church was likely named Saint Stephen, as was customary (indeed, the main church was called Saint Stephen, the second Saint Mary, and the baptisteries generally Saint John). In 590, The Life of Saint Columban speaks of a miracle that allegedly occurred at the church in Besançon, without further specifying the exact location. The building underwent several significant alterations, notably during the Carolingian period as well as in the 9th, 11th, 12th, and 17th centuries. During the Middle Ages, a significant conflict pitted the chapter of Saint John against that of Saint Stephen regarding the legitimacy of the status of mother church for the Cathedral of Saint John, considerably poisoning the life of the Besançon clergy.

==== Organization of the Community ====
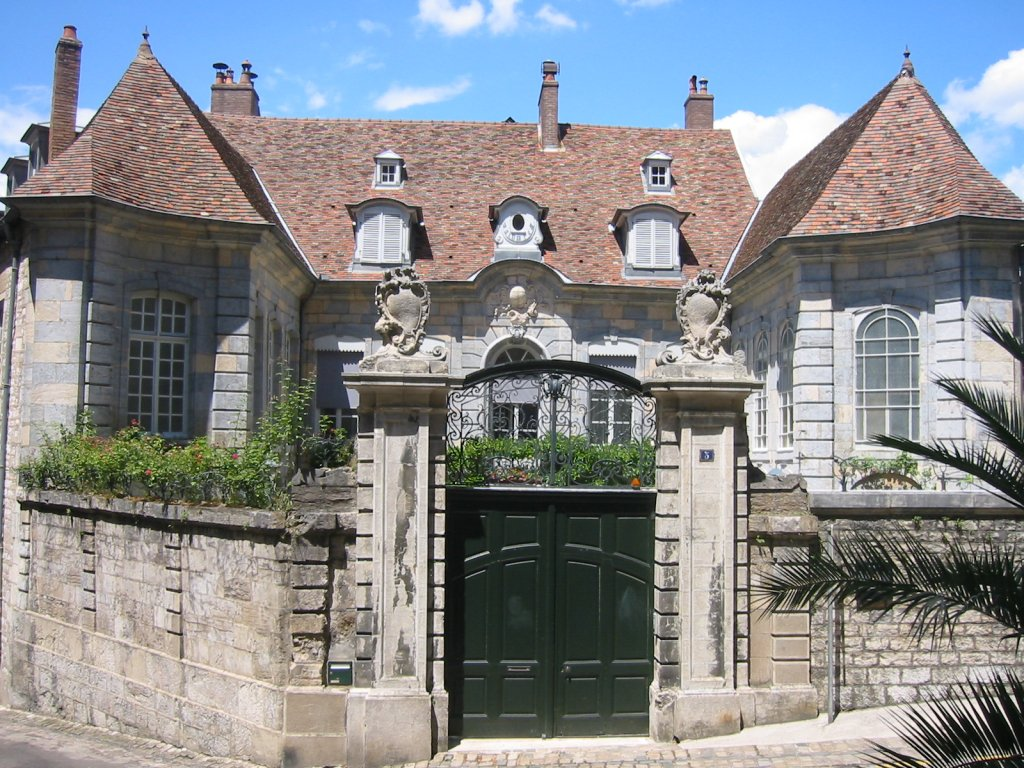
The archbishopric of Besançon.

Roman Catholic dioceses in France since 2002.

Created from the 4th century, the diocese of Besançon in its early days is very poorly known, particularly after the fall of the Roman Empire, during the period known as the great barbarian invasions when the Burgundians and Alamanni invaded Sequania. The Christianization of the countryside is even less known than the evolution of the city; however, a number of churches seem to have been erected near former Roman settlements. In the 6th century, Besançon was visited by Saint Columban. Monasticism began to establish itself and developed throughout the Early Middle Ages. The diocese was reorganized at the beginning of the 7th century with the Catholic kings Frankish Merovingians who drove out or integrated over several centuries the barbarians of France under the direction of the Catholic popes of the West. During the Carolingian feudal period, the counts of Burgundy practically held the power and the seat of the archbishops, although the latter were then important figures. The new abbeys, especially Cistercian, multiplied: they were the main centers of resistance to the episcopal schism of the Catholic German Emperor Frederick Barbarossa, suzerain of Franche-Comté and the archbishopric of Besançon. From the 13th to the 16th century, during the Protestant Reformation, Catholic institutions deteriorated. The policy of the sovereigns and the Parliament helped maintain the traditional faith.

The diocese of Besançon coincided almost entirely during the Ancien Régime with the County of Burgundy (or Franche-Comté, including the County of Montbéliard). The Ancien Régime diocese was abolished in 1790 and replaced, under the Civil Constitution of the Clergy, by three dioceses corresponding to the departments of Doubs, Haute-Saône, and part of Jura. Besançon was then a metropolis dependent on the dioceses of Bas-Rhin, Haut-Rhin, Côte-d'Or, Haute-Marne, Haute-Saône, Jura, and Vosges. Under the Concordat of 1801, the archdiocese was restored and corresponded to the limits of the departments of Doubs, Haute-Saône, and Jura (until the recreation of the Diocese of Saint-Claude in 1823, suffragan of Lyon). The Archdiocese of Besançon then had as suffragans Dijon and Autun (previously dependent on Lyon, to which they returned under the Restoration), Metz, Nancy-Toul, and Strasbourg, the latter three previously suffragans of the German archdiocese of Trier. Following the Franco-Prussian War, the Territoire de Belfort, which remained French, was detached from the diocese of Strasbourg and integrated into the archdiocese of Besançon. It then included the three departments of Doubs, Haute-Saône, and Territoire de Belfort. By the papal bull of Pope John Paul II on November 3, 1979, the Territoire de Belfort, the Pays de Montbéliard, and the canton of Héricourt in Haute-Saône were detached from the diocese of Besançon to form a new autonomous diocese, the Diocese of Belfort-Montbéliard.

=== Middle Ages to Modern Era ===
In the Middle Ages, treatment varied across different sectors of the city; indeed, the villages of Velotte and Bregille were properties of the archbishopric of Besançon, and the sectors of Saint-Ferjeux and Valentin were heavily taxed by the Franc-Comtois clergy. Only the inhabitants of Besançon intra-muros (the historic sector and Battant) were considered citizens of Besançon and, as such, exempt from all taxes of the archbishopric. As for the other sectors of the city or its agglomeration, there is little relevant information; it is only known that part of Planoise was, in the 15th century and until an unknown date, property of the archbishopric.

During this period, a violent conflict opposed two churches of the diocese of Besançon: the chapter of Saint John and the chapter of Saint Stephen. The latter reproached the church of Saint John for having deprived it of its title of mother church, thereby completely challenging the legitimacy of the diocesan seat of the cathedral. This conflict persisted until the chapter of Saint Stephen was excommunicated from the diocese of Besançon, but another solution was later found: the merger of the two chapters, thus putting an end to this conflict that had torn apart the clergy of the city for over 150 years.

Over the centuries, several religious communities settled, most often within the agglomeration itself. One can mention the Order of the Holy Spirit founded in the Comtois capital from the 13th century: from that time, a hospital was created which, throughout the Middle Ages, welcomed the sick, pregnant women, the elderly, travelers, and orphans. One can also cite the Jesuits who ran a religious establishment (current Collège Victor-Hugo), from May 26, 1597, until the suppression of their order in 1765. or the Sisters of Charity of Besançon, a community founded at the end of the 18th century by Jeanne-Antide Thouret.

==== Quarrel of the Chapters ====
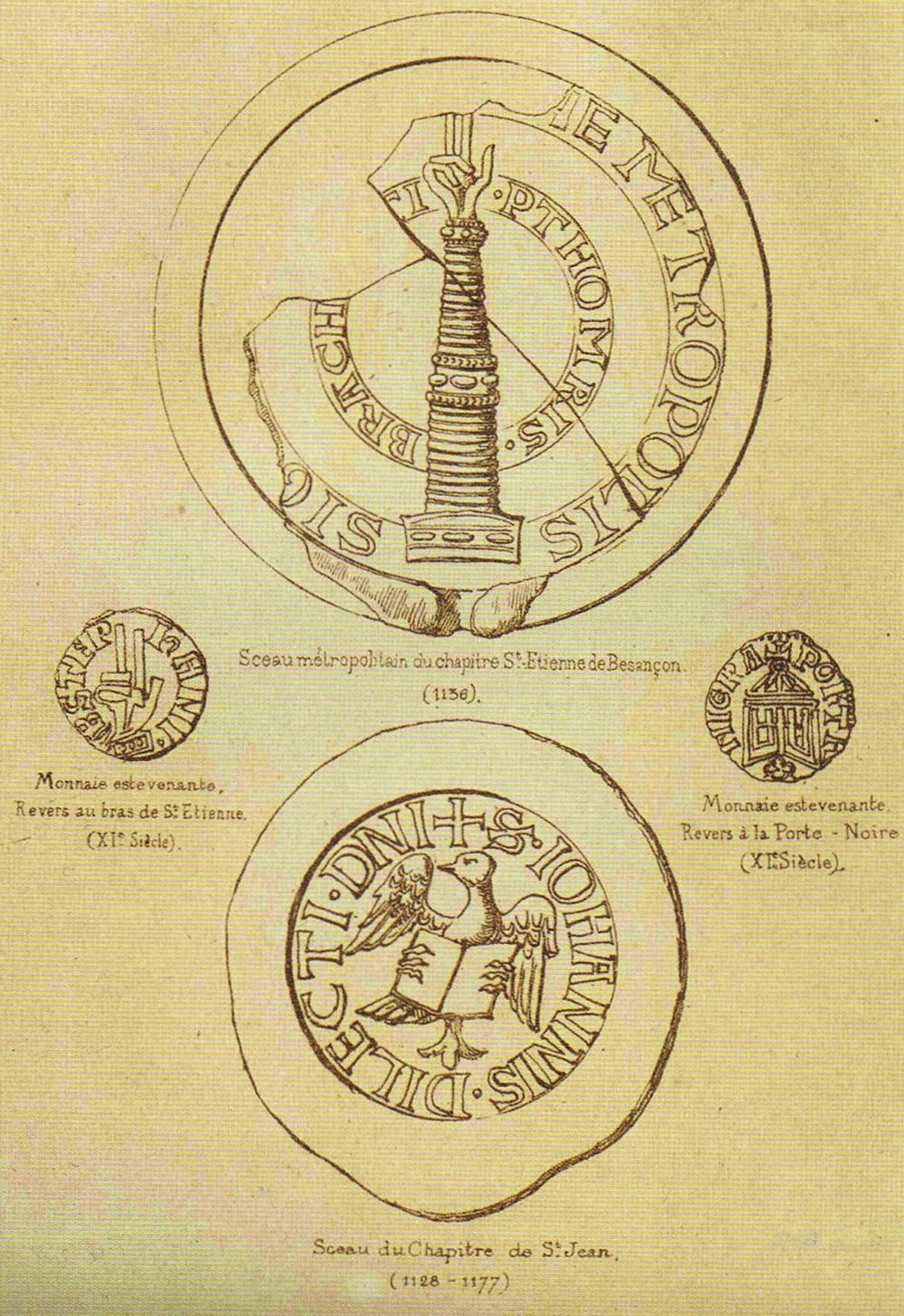
The seals of the chapter of Saint Stephen dating from 1156 and of the chapter of Saint John dating from 1128 to 1177. Next to them is drawn their estevenant currency (drawings from 1880).

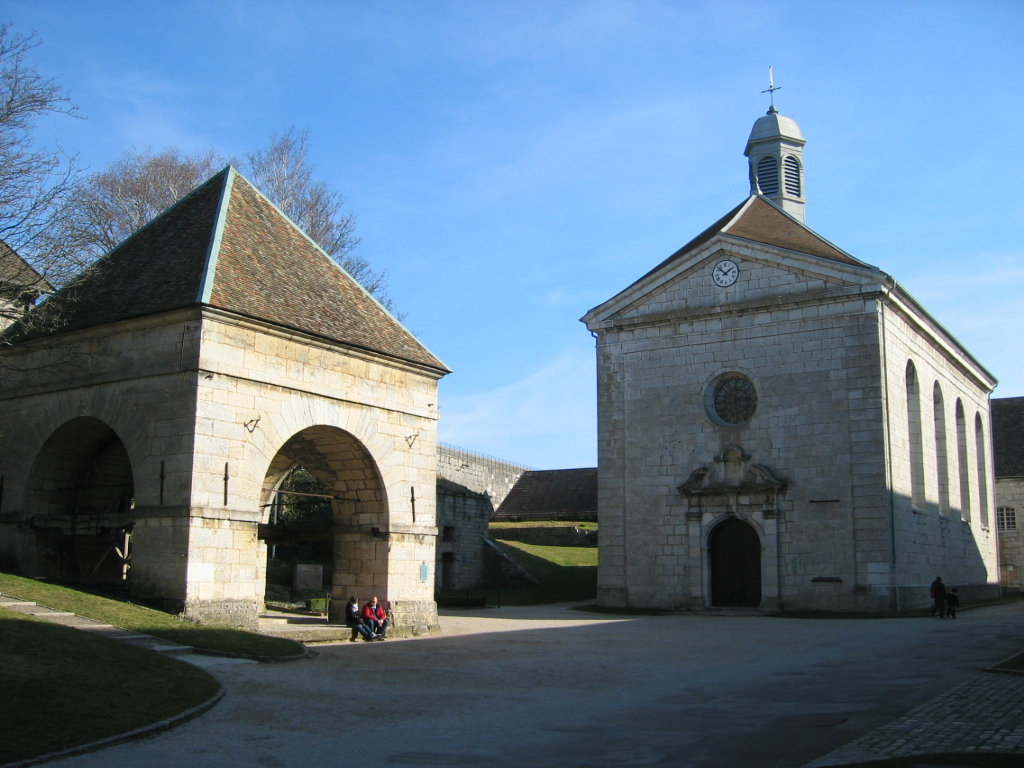
The chapel of Saint Stephen by Vauban, rebuilt after the demolition of the church of the chapter of Saint Stephen in 1674, allowing the construction of a citadel.

Between the 12th and 13th centuries, a significant debate arose (known as the quarrel of the chapters) between the Cathedral of Saint John and the Church of Saint Stephen in Besançon. Archbishop Hugues de Salins, who had remodeled the Cathedral of Saint John, also built the Church of Saint Stephen (near the Citadel of Besançon) from 1033 to 1050 based on plans by Gautier. Hugues de Salins also established a chapter that was to coexist with the old chapter of the Cathedral of Saint John located nearby, named the chapter of Saint John and Saint Stephen. The two chapters participated in the election of the archbishop, and the liturgy assigned each its role, but Saint John remained primary.

However, the chapter of Saint Stephen complained in 1092 of being deprived of its precedence, Saint Stephen being the true mother church of the diocese of Besançon. Its main argument was that the oldest titles named the church of Saint Stephen. However, the arguments put forward did not convince Archbishop Hugues III, who severely rejected this claim to primacy. Conflicts resumed with such intensity that the successor of Hugues III, Archbishop Ponce, had to resign in 1107 under increasingly unbearable pressure within the diocese. The administration of the diocese of Besançon was then entrusted to Gui de Bourgogne, who sided with Saint John, affirming its legitimacy as the ecclesiastical seat.

Gui de Bourgogne then supported his successor, William of Arguel, who had this legitimacy confirmed by Pope Paschal II in 1112. Yet, the chapter of Saint Stephen did not give up and brought the case to the court of Rome to judge which church should be the ecclesiastical seat of Besançon and the diocese. It received the support of Henry V, and Pope Paschal II, exasperated by the situation, convened a council held in Tournus. In 1115, the latter proclaimed the rightful claim of Saint John, but an unexpected event overturned everything: Pope Paschal II, influenced by the delegates of Saint Stephen, disavowed his legate and the council, pretexting a procedural flaw to make a new decision. Thus, in 1116, Saint Stephen officially became the mother house, leading to the resignation of the then archbishop, a certain William.

The election of the Franc-Comtois Gui de Bourgogne as pope, under the name Callixtus II, once again turned the situation around. Indeed, a fervent defender of the legitimacy of the Cathedral of Saint John as the ecclesiastical seat, he annulled his predecessor's decision on March 10, 1121, and again on March 19, 1122. He said in March 1123, during the great Roman council: "As much as it is fitting for a successor to keep the legitimate decisions of his predecessors, so much must he reform their unfortunate acts with salutary measures". The council unanimously approved the official recognition of the Cathedral of Saint John of Besançon as the mother house and ecclesiastical seat of the diocese.

The chapter of Saint Stephen, which could only bow, nevertheless tried to regain its luster through Archbishop Anseri. This archbishop granted Pierre de Traves (who was then dean of Saint Stephen) and all his successors all the rights he had over the archdeaconry of Salins. This new status meant that the archdeacon of Salins now pledged allegiance to the dean of Saint Stephen and no longer to the archbishop of Saint John, as was normally the case. This extraordinary liberality was a new source of conflict. Archbishop Herbert viewed it unfavorably, reaffirmed his full rights, and demanded the homage of the archdeacon of Salins, and the measure was subsequently annulled. Yet, new conflicts between the two churches erupted again; Saint Stephen, believing itself exempt from all authority of the archbishop, initiated lawsuit after lawsuit before the court of Rome and systematically opposed all archbishops supported by Saint John.

In 1238, the chapter of Saint Stephen was excommunicated because of its incessant attacks against the Cathedral of Saint John. Yet, the abbot of Saint-Vincent, the prior of Saint-Paul, and six abbots of the diocese wrote to Pope Honorius III begging him to preserve the full rights of the Cathedral of Saint John. Here is an excerpt from the letter: "Request to preserve for the church of Saint John the Evangelist of Besançon the dignity of mother church which it has enjoyed from time immemorial and still enjoys to the exclusion of all churches in the province". A radical but effective solution was finally provided by Archbishop William of La Tour between 1253 and 1254: the merger of the two chapters. A negotiation brought together the two chapters on September 30, 1253, and Pope Innocent IV officially ratified this decision on August 1, 1254. A chronogram indicates this date of 1253: MATER eCCLesIa bIsvntIna.

==== Bregille ====
From the High Middle Ages, the abbey of Saint-Martin in Bregille was founded. The exact date of its foundation is still highly contested today, but Bernard de Bregille, a specialist of this period, supports the hypothesis that the building could have been built as early as the 6th century. In 870, the abbey is mentioned in the Treaty of Meerssen, by which Charles the Bald and Louis the German divided Sequania. In the 13th century, the bourgeois of Besançon attempted to form the commune of Besançon, thus opposing the archbishop of Besançon, who intended to retain his full rights of sovereignty over the lands of Bregille which belonged to him at the time. A conflict broke out in 1232 when the Bisontins forbade the Brégillots from supplying themselves with wood in the Forest of Chailluz. Nicolas de Flavigny, then archbishop of Besançon, reminded them of his rights over the woods of the city to the bishop of Chalon, who soon agreed with him, thus stopping the conflict for a time.

After a struggle between the city and the imperial armies and their vassals, in 1290, Otto IV decided to end the conflict and submit, allowing the Bisontins to have their commune officially recognized by the Empire. This was the beginning of a new battle between the citizens and the archbishop. The village of Bregille was at the time accessible by a pontoon bridge crossing the Doubs, connected to the Bregille gate and built in 1398. One could also cross the Doubs by a ferry, whose toll went to the archbishop. In Besançon, under the communal regime, only the inhabitants intra muros were recognized as citizens of the city and, as such, exempt from all taxes, unlike Saint-Ferjeux and Valentin, while Bregille and Velotte were subjects of the archbishop.

In 1444, the Écorcheurs entered Franche-Comté and approached the Comtois capital at the end of May of the same year. The communards then decided to destroy a large part of Bregille, including the old abbey of Saint-Martin, to avoid, according to them, the inevitable devastation of the site by the Écorcheurs. Several new conflicts followed between inhabitants of the city and the archbishop, the latter demanding compensation for the losses suffered on his lands. This conflict led to the death of Bisontins who wanted to rebel against the archbishop and to the financial ruin of the city, which could not repair the damage suffered. The archbishop then agreed that the clerics and Brégillots would only pay their taxes in 1457.

==== Saint-Ferjeux ====
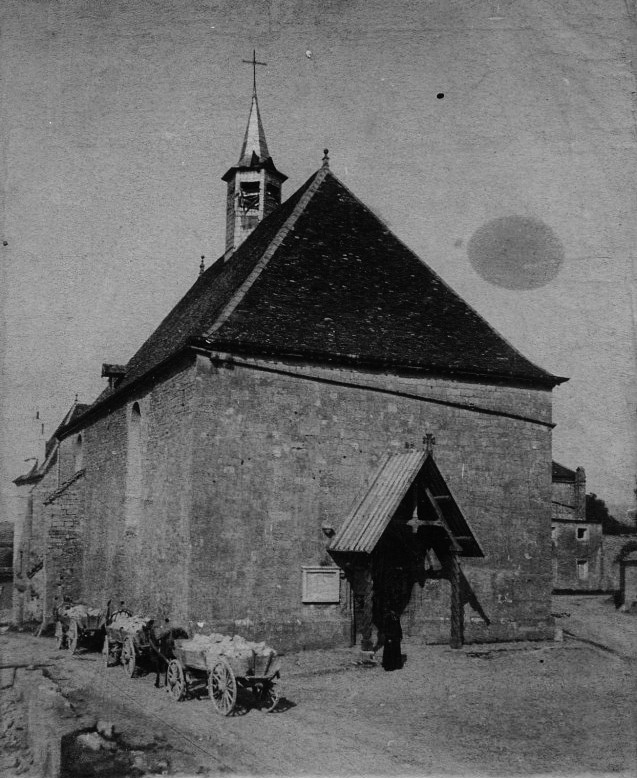
The old church of Saint-Ferjeux before 1884.

The village of Saint-Ferjeux is a particular sector in relation to the ecclesia of Besançon. Indeed, according to tradition, it is on its lands that the two founders of Franc-Comtois Christianity, the martyrs Saint Ferrutio and Ferreolus, preached and died. They were tortured and assassinated in 212 before being brought back to a cave in the sector, where they had settled to preach the gospel. The cave where their bodies were placed became a true sanctuary after their death. But between 260 and 296, Vesontio was invaded and pillaged several times by barbarians from the Rhine, and a large part of the population decided to flee, abandoning the sanctuary of the two martyrs. In 355, the city was almost entirely devastated but managed to rise from its ashes. In 370, a Christian officer hunting in the countryside of Vesontio rediscovered the cave, and the martyrs' coffins were transferred to the choir of the Cathedral of Saint John shortly thereafter. The same year, Bishop Aignan undertook the construction of a chapel above the cave; the building was completed by his successor, Sylvester, who had the martyrs' remains brought back there. The road connecting the chapel to the city was named "chemin des Saints". To watch over the new holy place, a community of clerics was established. Gregory of Tours reported in the 6th century that the place gradually became a pilgrimage site. People came from all over France to pray at the martyrs' tomb. The two bishops who consecrated the building were also buried in this holy place; their sarcophagi were found in 1730 under the chapel's slabs. Around 1085, the clerics were replaced by Benedictine brothers dependent on the Abbey of Saint-Vincent. The latter became the owner of the "house" of Saint-Ferjeux at the end of the 12th century, and in 1232, Pierre, lord of Arguel, who collected the tithe from the lands of Saint-Ferjeux, donated it to the abbot of Saint-Vincent. In 1628, the Thirty Years' War arrived in Franche-Comté, Swedish troops besieged the village and burned the church. The building was not rebuilt until 1659 on the very spot where it had been destroyed, after various debates within the clergy about the location of reconstruction. The current Basilica of Saint-Ferjeux was built by Alfred Ducat from the late 1880s and completed around 1901.

==== Other sectors ====
As early as the 5th century, a hermit named Saint Leonard lived in a cave located in the area of the Chapelle des Buis. A hermitage where religious ceremonies took place, dating from the 13th century, is attested before the current chapel replaced it. The latter, built shortly after the disappearance of the hermitage, was damaged in 1815 and restored and enlarged at the end of the 19th century. The third religious community of the city seems to be that of the district of Velotte, where the parish of the same name appears in texts from the mid-11th century. In the 15th century, the clergy acquired the lands of Planoise as well as part of the eponymous hill. There is currently little information on the other sectors of the city, except for a place called "Pater" in the district of Chaprais.

=== Reformation ===
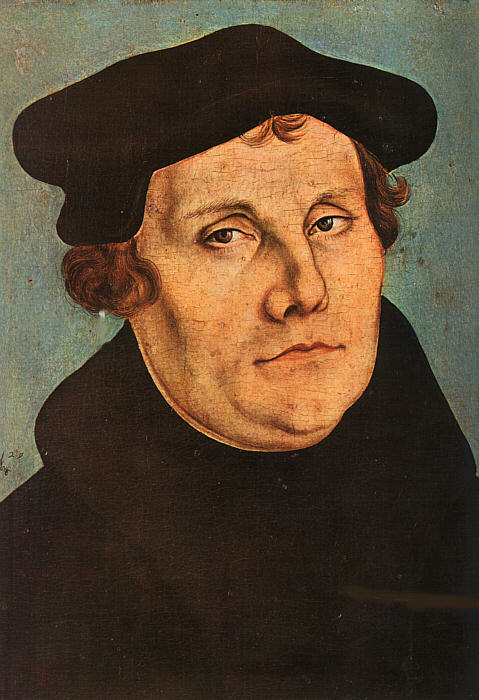
Martin Luther.

Protestantism appeared in the city from the late 1530s, when illustrious members of the Reformation came to preach the new heretical dogmas. The city, deeply rooted in "classical" Catholic traditions, nevertheless became increasingly sensitive to the new faith, particularly due to its proximity to the Principality of Montbéliard and Switzerland, territories that easily conveyed these rites. However, the authorities, hostile to Protestants, managed to contain the movement, albeit with difficulty, until a battle opposed the two sides in 1575, the victorious outcome of the Roman Church ensuring that it definitively regained control over the region. From then on, Protestants were no longer welcome and had to either exile themselves to welcoming lands or confine themselves to avoid being discovered.

This situation lasted until the French Revolution, which recognized this religion and, also thanks to a significant number of Swiss immigrants, revived the Besançon community. It prospered until obtaining a place of worship, the Temple of the Holy Spirit, where services are still provided today. In parallel with the purely confessional aspect, the Reformed organized themselves and integrated into the Reformed Church of France, creating numerous intra- and inter-parish activities and events. Yet in Besançon, the Protestant identity appears faded, explained by a painful historical context but also by particular sociological aspects. The Protestant population in the parish of Besançon was estimated at 2,000 people in 1999, proof that despite the current discretion, the congregation is very much alive.

=== French Revolution ===
The Civil Constitution of the Clergy, adopted on July 12, 1790, and ratified by the king on December 26, 1790, transformed members of the clergy into civil servants paid by the state. Members of the secular clergy were henceforth elected and had to swear an oath of loyalty to the Nation, the Law, and the King. Following a well-established Gallican tradition among part of the bourgeoisie, as well as part of the Enlightenment heritage favorable to the secularization of society, the deputies did not ask the pope for his opinion on the reforms of the Catholic clergy. The first clerics began to take the oath without waiting for the pontiff's opinion. But as early as March 1791, Pope Pius VI condemned all these reforms aimed at the Church of France. The Constituent Assembly divided the population into two antagonistic camps. There were approximately 65% non-juring or refractory ecclesiastics throughout France. In Besançon, a bourgeois house in the city center and another in the Chapelle des Buis secretly hosted worship. It is estimated that one-third of the 2,000 Franc-Comtois priests became jurors, while the others were refractory.

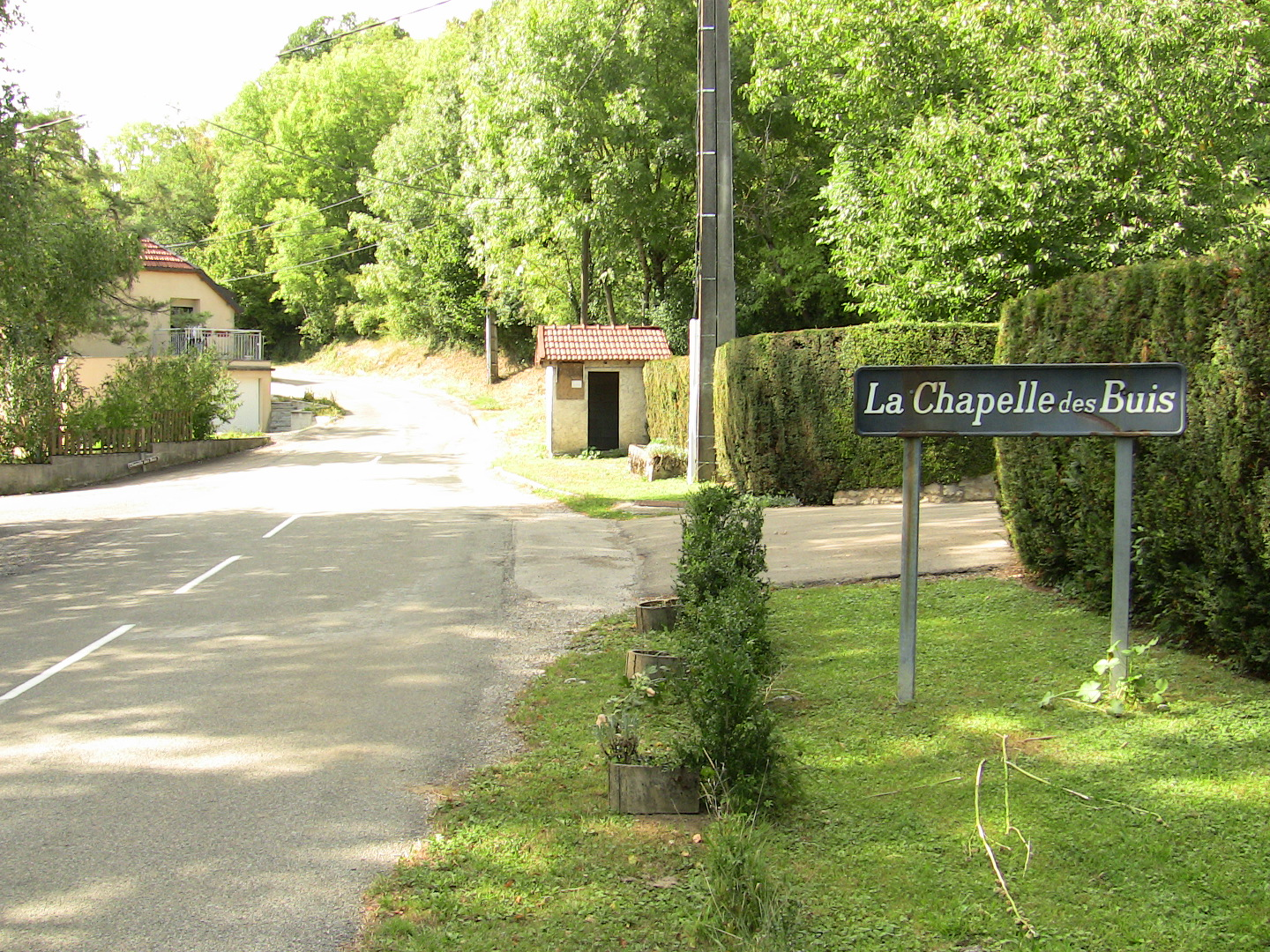
The Chapelle des Buis.

Several writings inform us about this period:

Already the Revolution was beginning to strike its first blows by lowering the power of the king and outraging the clergy. Already it was foreseen that an immense and terrible catastrophe, a fierce struggle of anarchy against society, of impiety against virtue, was about to occur. It was felt that the impure philosophy of the 18th century was going to bear its fruits. The family of Jean Baptiste trembled, all of whose members would have willingly given their blood to the last drop for the defense of their king. When the churches were closed and worship was prohibited, then the old Jean Baptiste was seen, braving the scaffold and the infirmities of old age, aged 85, going every Sunday with his children to Besançon to piously hear mass which was secretly said in a bourgeois house. More than once, however, they had the consolation of hearing it in their hamlet where a room had been arranged for that purpose. One day, an intruding priest installed in Morre, their parish, knowing all the influence that his family could give him, came to ask the members to recognize his authority and to attend his offices. The old Jean Baptiste answered him curtly that they would never attend the mass of a schismatic. The poor intruder returned very disappointed. God finally, casting his eyes on France, caused the Revolution to cease and his worship to be reborn, and Jean Baptiste had the consolation before dying of seeing the churches returned to the piety of the people.

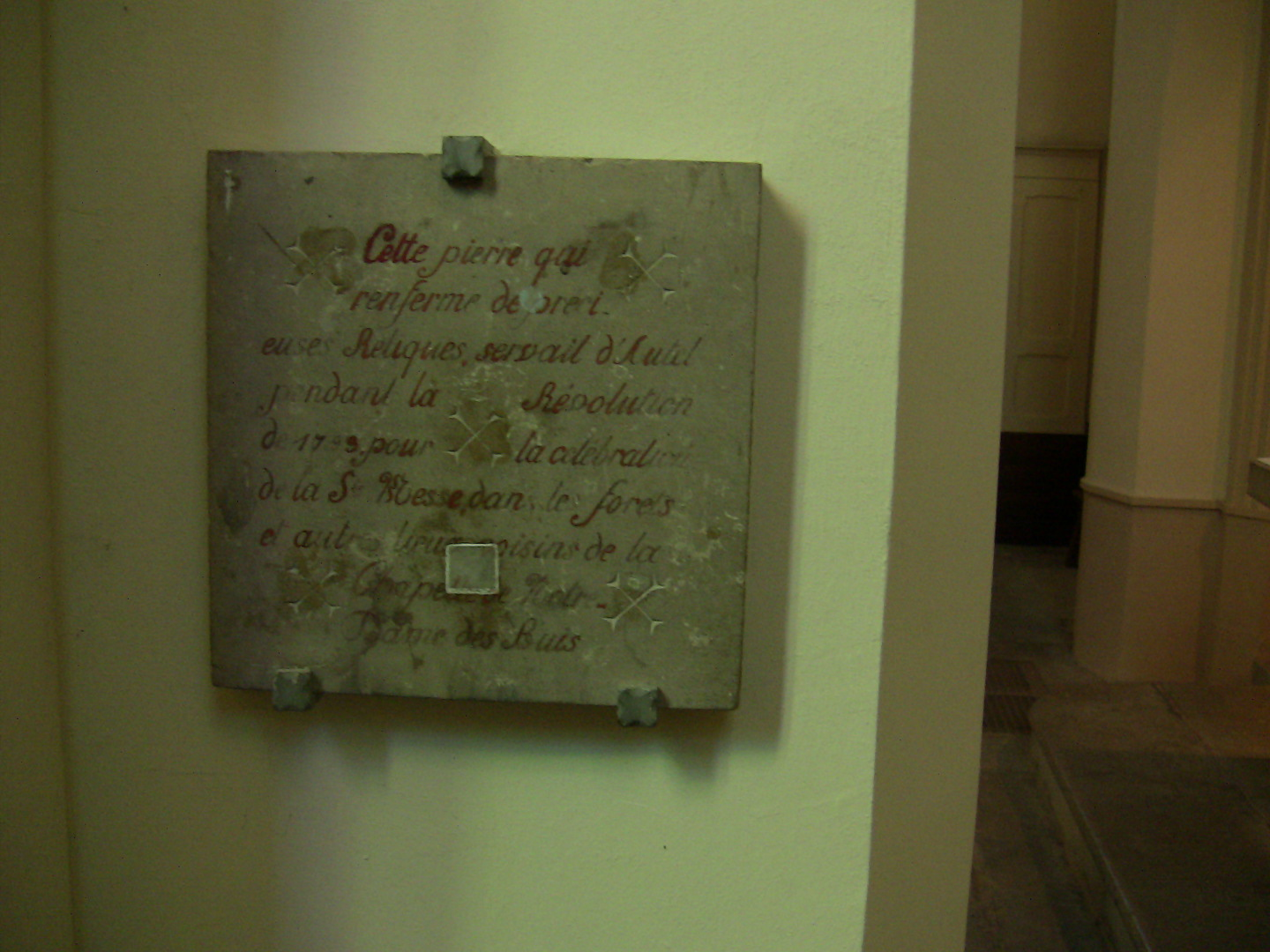
The plaque of the Chapelle des Buis. It reads "This stone, which contains precious relics, served as an altar during the Revolution of 1793 for the celebration of Holy Mass."

In the area of the Chapelle des Buis, which became a true haven for counter-revolutionaries, two families, the Pinard and the Jeannin, were particularly known according to Gaston Coindre's book Mon vieux Besançon for "the simplicity of their manners and the fervor of their practices. It was observed at that time that in this edifying hamlet, if strangers forgot themselves in curses or blasphemies, they were reproached by the severe injunction: here we do not swear!" Still in this work, Constant Pinard mentions, speaking of the head of the Jeannin family:

Also, nothing stopped his zeal, and taking all the time that the terror lasted, he hid the priests, thus exposing himself to the greatest dangers and even death for the defense of his faith. A room served as a chapel. An altar was improvised, and the holy mysteries were celebrated. The ornaments and sacred vessels were carefully hidden in secret cupboards. However, the evil was still increasing, and Jean Antoine Jeannin had an uncle who was a priest in Chemaudin, who was arrested to be handed over to the executioner. Led by the gendarmerie of Saint-Vit who were taking him to Besançon to be beheaded, he was stopped on the way by the population that had risen en masse. Filled with faith and loving its priests, it conceived the audacious project of abducting him. Jean Antoine, having been warned, ran there in the company of Jean Joseph Pinard and three other people from Fontain. The gendarmes, ten in number, armed to the teeth, were determined to defend themselves valiantly. It was a matter of abducting him without getting caught or killing anyone. The peasants, two or three hundred in number, unarmed, rushed en masse upon the gendarmes who drew their swords and cut off the arm of the first one who stopped them, several others were wounded, but the priest was abducted, and then everyone fled, without it being possible for the gendarmes to arrest a single one. The next day, an artillery battery came to surround the village of Chemaudin. An expertise was made, and all the wounded were taken to prison, being assured that they had belonged to the troop. But they stayed there only a short time, and a small sum of money was enough to free them.

The existence of a clandestine place of worship is confirmed by Gaston Coindre, referring to the memories of Abbot Lambert, "former chaplain of the Duchess of Orleans", who was welcomed into "the hospitable house of the Jeannin". He says of it: "It is a refuge open to all honest unfortunates... I occupied an underground room, and an adjoining room served as my chapel... Other distinguished guests had found refuge and security on the mountain in the patriarchal dwelling of the Jeannin, several nuns had the joy of attending the mass of good priests in the crypt that the layout of the land has preserved." A descendant of the Jeannin, then a missionary bishop in Indochina (now Vietnam), wrote in 1936 that he was shown a room that had served for clandestine celebrations. A stone plaque, preserved in the Chapelle Notre-Dame des Buis, proves the existence of another hidden place of worship in the area. Constant Pinard refers to this plaque regarding a refractory priest from Fontain: "A kind of cave had been dug for him in a forest half a league from the village, and it is there that he hid. One entered through a trapdoor covered with moss. A nearby rock served as an altar for the celebration of the holy mysteries." François Constant, the elder brother of Constant, recounts more precisely: "Starting from the southwest corner of the Ruroye farm and measuring on an inclined plane to the forest ditch, a line of about one hundred and seventy meters, and from there, taking a straight line of forty meters up the wood, one surely arrives at the rock." Currently, this hideout has still not been found.

=== Contemporary Era ===
The Contemporary Era brought a change with the development of the two other Abrahamic religions: Judaism and Islam alongside Christianity.

Before the First World War, the only other significantly present communities were the Jewish community of the city and the Protestant Lutherans. From the 1930s, the Mormons founded a church in the city, then after the Second World War, the Orthodox, the Jehovah's Witnesses, the Pentecostal and Evangelical Protestants arrived. Other religions appeared, such as Islam from the 1960s, which gradually became the second religion in France. As for the Jews of the city, few in number before the Second World War (about 2,500 people out of 63,508 inhabitants, or less than 4% of the total population), they massively fled anti-Semitic repression, almost causing the community to disappear at the end of the 1940s. From the 1950s, a decline in the number of Catholic Bisontins was recorded for the first time, a trend confirmed at the national level.

==== Separation of Church and State ====
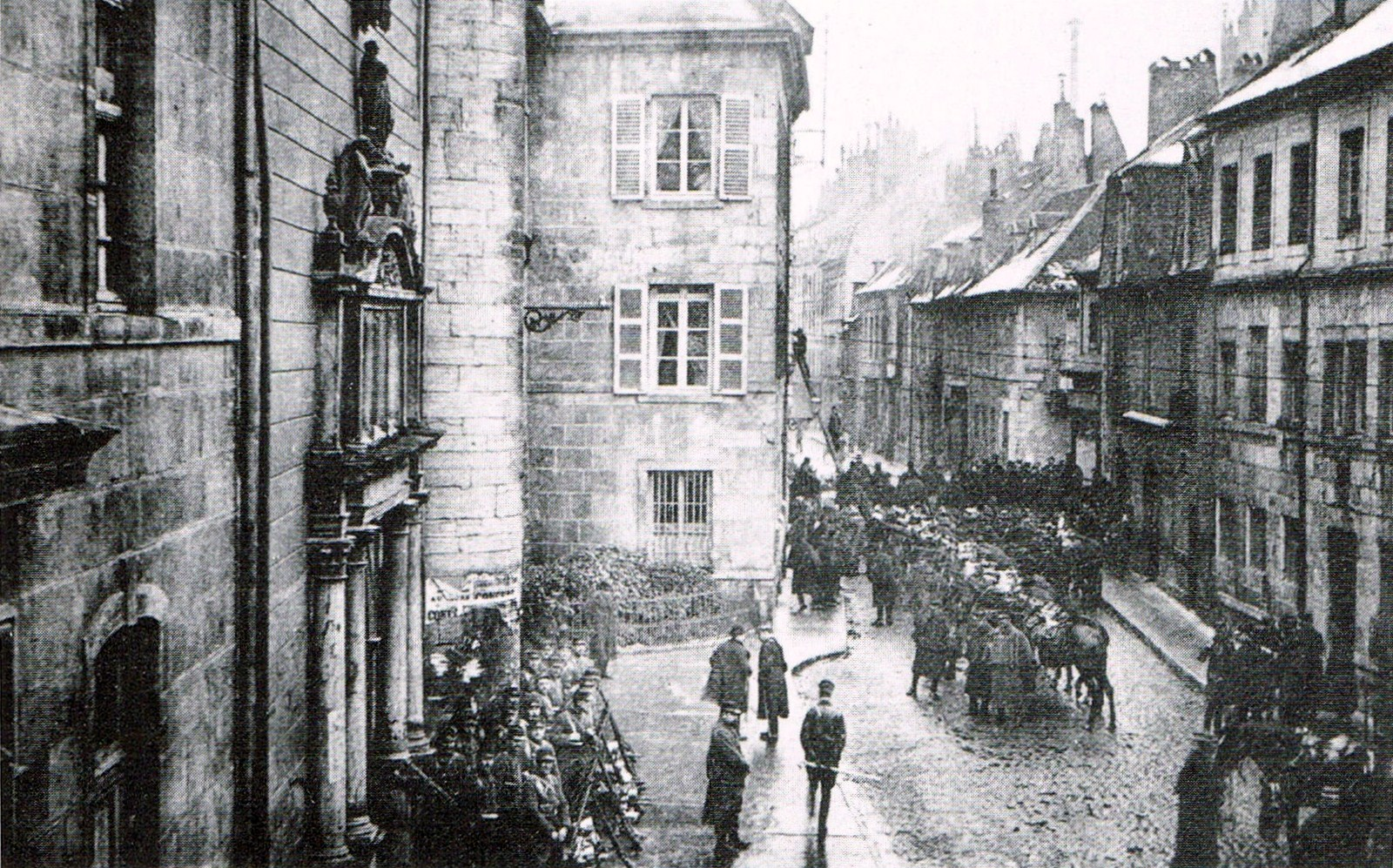
The inventory of the Church of Notre-Dame, February 14, 1906.

From 1879, the republicans took power, and gradually a struggle opened between the government and the Church. In Besançon, the first tensions materialized in 1897, when the northern chapel of the Church of Saint-Pierre was destroyed to widen the street alongside it. Indeed, since the Council of Trent, the Comtois capital and the Doubs were considered a bastion of Catholicism against Protestantism from Montbéliard and Geneva. The inhabitants were then fervent defenders of Catholic traditions and did not like it when the Franc-Comtois clergy was interfered with. In 1906, the struggle between the Church and civil authorities reached its peak during the various inventories established in places of worship. On January 23, 1906, the main Besançon newspapers announced that "the inventories of the property of establishments suppressed by article 2 of December 2 last began in our city yesterday, the 22nd instant". The first inventories were then carried out in the archbishopric, and Bishop Fulbert Petit, who initially protested, eventually withdrew and left the registration inspector Aubertin and the deputy mayor of the city, Grosjean, with his delegate to proceed with the inventory. The Synagogue of Besançon in the presence of the treasurer of the consistory on the same day, and the Protestant temple of the city on January 29, 1906, in the presence of Pastor Cadix, then president of the presbyteral council, two other pastors, and the treasurers of the diaconate, were also subjected to inventory and offered no resistance.

However, the reactions from the population were much more somber. On February 5, 1906, an inventory was to be held in the Cathedral of Saint John, but a huge crowd waited in the adjacent streets and even inside the cathedral. At nine o'clock in the morning, Mr. Aubertin, the registration inspector, arrived near the building accompanied by Deputy Mayor Grosjean. Durand de Gevigney, then president of the church council, received the two men on the steps of the cathedral and addressed them with a protest, imitated by Bishop Sallot de Brobèque and then by Vicar General Burlet, condemning the inventory in the name of God, Jesus Christ, the pope, the archbishop, the chapter, the clergy, the benefactors of the cathedral, the parishioners, past generations, justice, and law. Mr. Grosjean then announced his intention to enter the cathedral, but faced with the crowd that seemed to become increasingly threatening, he preferred to withdraw. The mayor of the city, after being informed of this incident, decided to take heavy measures: on the same day at noon, two hundred mounted artillerymen with all the lieutenants and artillery adjutants, two infantry companies, as well as numerous gendarmes cordoned off the perimeter of the Cathedral of Saint John with agents and firefighters already on site. In the early afternoon, the central commissioner presented himself at the side door of the adjacent buildings of the cathedral located on Place du Palais, and after three summons, he had the door knocked down by an engineering section with axes.

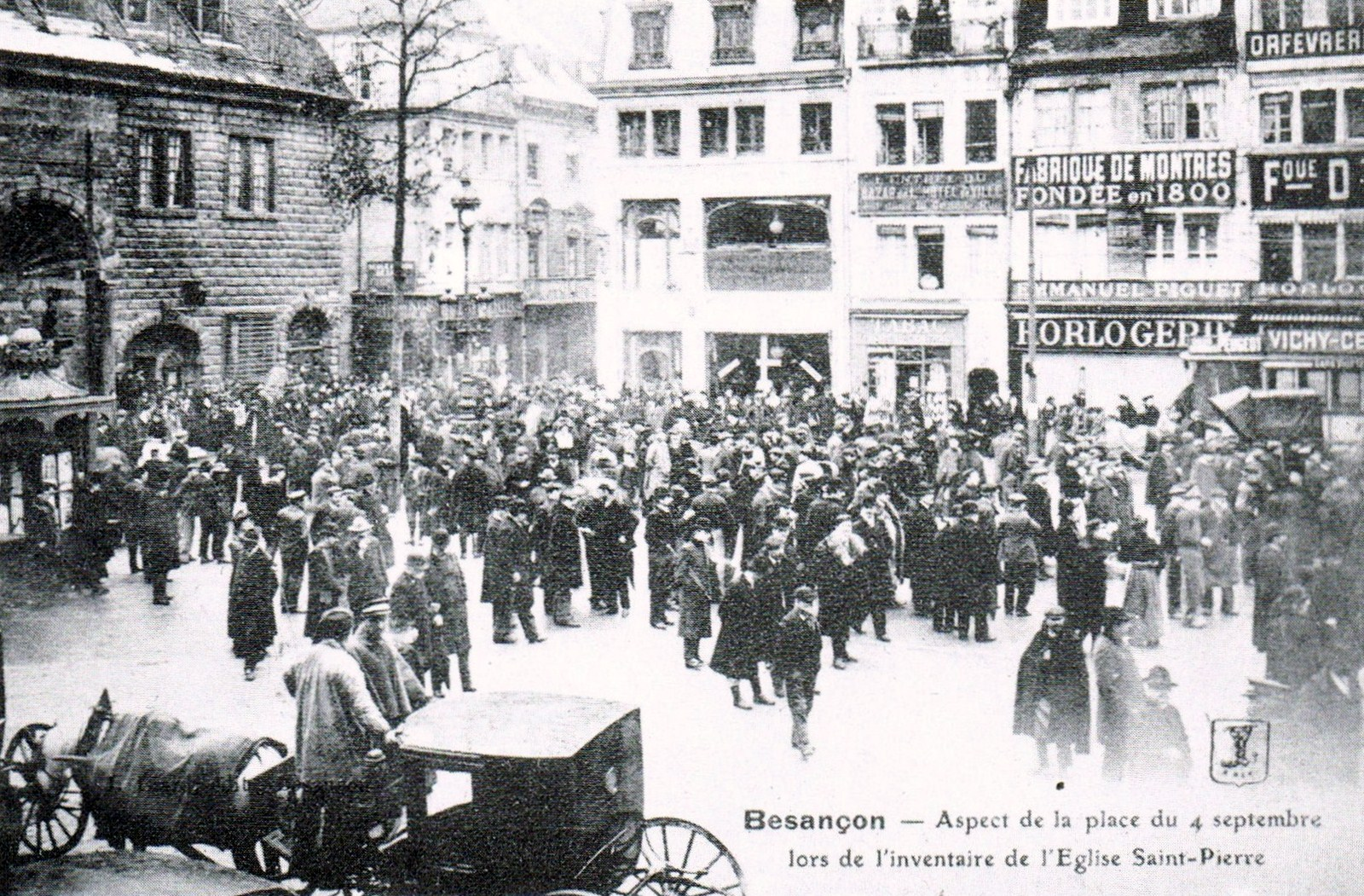
The attempt to inventory the Church of Saint-Pierre, February 14, 1906.

The group crossed a courtyard, broke down the door of the canons' corridor before knocking down the one giving access to the north aisle, and the inventory began. Outside the building, a huge crowd formed, called by the bells of the cathedral, and some demonstrators then unleashed. Blows were exchanged, and a general riot was narrowly avoided; it was then that the streets became crowded, and the demonstration spread throughout the city. From the next day, the press of both camps mutually blamed each other for the disorders, with the newspaper Le Petit Comtois writing that priests armed with leaded canes did not hesitate to take part in the riots. In the following days, several people were brought to trial, including Georges Mairot, then president of the Catholic youth of Franche-Comté, who was sentenced to six days in prison without suspension for insulting a police commissioner. On February 8, 1906, the inventory took place in the Church of Saint-Maurice without incident, as the priest had asked the faithful to submit. Then, on February 9, 1906, the Église Saint-François-Xavier also underwent an inventory without major incidents, with the neighboring streets having been blocked and occupied by gendarmerie troops from five-thirty in the morning. The adjacent courtyards of the Collège Victor-Hugo were even used to install fire pumps to repel any assault attempt by demonstrators. A large number of spectators crowded calmly, attentively watching the priest's protests, judged vigorous and violent by the newspapers Le petit Comtois and L'Éclair.

On February 14, 1906, it was the turn of the Church of Notre-Dame to receive the registration inspector and his colleagues. After the engineering corps broke down a side door, the priest decided to open the sacristy, the strongboxes, and the cupboards to avoid any unnecessary damage. The gendarmerie had, as a precaution, cordoned off the area and barred Rue Mégevand on both sides. On the same day, the inventory that was to take place in the Church of Saint-Pierre was postponed to the next day, as the officials could not enter the building. After the priest's and the church council's protests were heard the next day, the doors of the church were broken down until access was gained, and the inventory began. Few people gathered in front of the building due to the very early hour. At the same time, Bishop Fulbert Petit adopted the strategy of understanding and cooperation with the government to avoid any new conflict, a position that was subsequently followed by the entire Besançon clergy. The ecclesiastic then created defense and religious action committees, free schools, and encouraged lay Catholic movements before dying on December 6, 1909. This chapter in the history of Besançon thus ended without further clashes, and religious life resumed normally in the Comtois capital.

==== World Wars ====
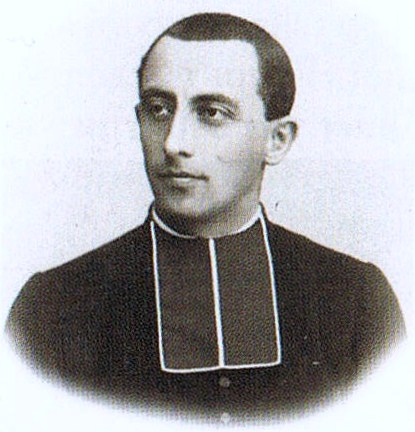
Canon Hubert Mourot.

The First World War only indirectly concerned the diocese of Besançon. From 1916, Canon Mourot worried about the health of orphaned and disadvantaged children affected by the scourge of war, and he sought support to create a home capable of welcoming them. After several searches for financing and a building to accommodate boarders, the Salins de Bregille were created and still exist today.

During the Second World War, the Church of Besançon, as elsewhere in France, was heavily disrupted but not banned. Many religious personalities were directly affected, including sisters and priests. Sister Marcelle Baverez, a nun and French resistant, born in Besançon (Doubs) on March 8, 1899, was deported to the concentration camp for women in Ravensbrück, where she died on November 1, 1944. She had saved many people sentenced to death in the hospital, aided in the escape of several prisoners of war, and was also responsible for a Resistance intelligence service and a network of false papers. Abbot Robert Bourgeois was also a resistant killed for France who notably organized early internal resistance against the Nazi occupation in the Comtois capital and helped boost the morale of the inhabitants through his sermons. Our Lady of Liberation is a Catholic place of worship built within an old fort overlooking the city of Besançon (Doubs) at nearly 500 meters altitude. The monument was consecrated after the Second World War by Bishop Maurice Dubourg, who wanted to build a building if the Comtois capital was not ravaged by bombings. Subsequently, commemorative plaques lining the walls of the building and paying tribute to the diocesans as well as all the Bisontins who died during the Second World War were added, as well as a monumental statue seven meters high.

==== Immigration and Christianity ====
Throughout time, the Comtois capital experienced more or less strong waves of immigration, most often due to the need for labor. From the 1950s, with the reconstruction of the country after the Second World War and industrial expansion in the Comtois capital, many immigrants from all over Europe, North Africa, Sub-Saharan Africa, and Asia arrived in Besançon. North Africans introduced Islam, Asians Buddhism, while Europeans were mostly Christian. Thus, Christian communities from the Iberian Peninsula (Spain and Portugal), from all over Italy and to a lesser extent from Eastern Europe emerged in the city. During the census of 1936, the year when the proportion of foreigners was the highest in the city, there were a total of 3,212 foreigners out of a population of 56,491 inhabitants, or about 5.7% of the total population. The Italians, fervent Christians, represented the largest foreign community in the Comtois capital with 1,352 people, followed by the Swiss, mostly Protestants, numbering 1,103, the Poles who were about 156, and migrants of other nationalities in smaller numbers.

== 21st century ==
Besançon hosts in the 21st century numerous Christian communities from the three branches of Christianity: Catholic, Orthodox, and Protestant.

Since 1991, the city of Besançon has had a radio station entirely dedicated to the Christian community of the city: RCF Besançon. It is an associative radio located at 18 Rue Mégevand in the heart of the La Boucle district. It discusses the life of Christians and the Besançon community, and was originally called Radio Horizon before joining the network of French-speaking Christian radios and becoming RCF Besançon. In addition to Besançon, the radio broadcasts in the cities of Belfort, Pontarlier, Vesoul, and Maîche, and had around 50,000 weekly listeners in 2001.

A survey conducted by the Institut français d'opinion publique (IFOP) in 2007 for La Vie reveals that 64% of French people identify as Catholics, 27% as without religion, 3% as Muslims, 2.1% as Protestants, and 0.6% as Jews. In Besançon, this national average is roughly observed, given that Catholicism is the primary religion of the Bisontins, Islam the second, and Judaism among the least represented. However, the Comtois capital has been experiencing for several decades, like many other French and European cities, a decline in church attendance rates and the number of faithful within its community. The diocese has attempted to respond, notably by launching a reality TV series titled Prêtres Academy. This show is based on the concept of Star Academy, with episodes about the daily lives of three priests from the Besançon diocese broadcast online, but with a different purpose: to show the general public that priests and churchmen are well-adjusted individuals living in tune with their times. Although the show received significant media attention at its launch (notably through TF1), and the introduction was viewed over 175,000 times on Dailymotion, the episodes themselves were largely ignored and far less watched by the public.

=== Catholic communities ===
==== Six Parishes of the Deanery ====
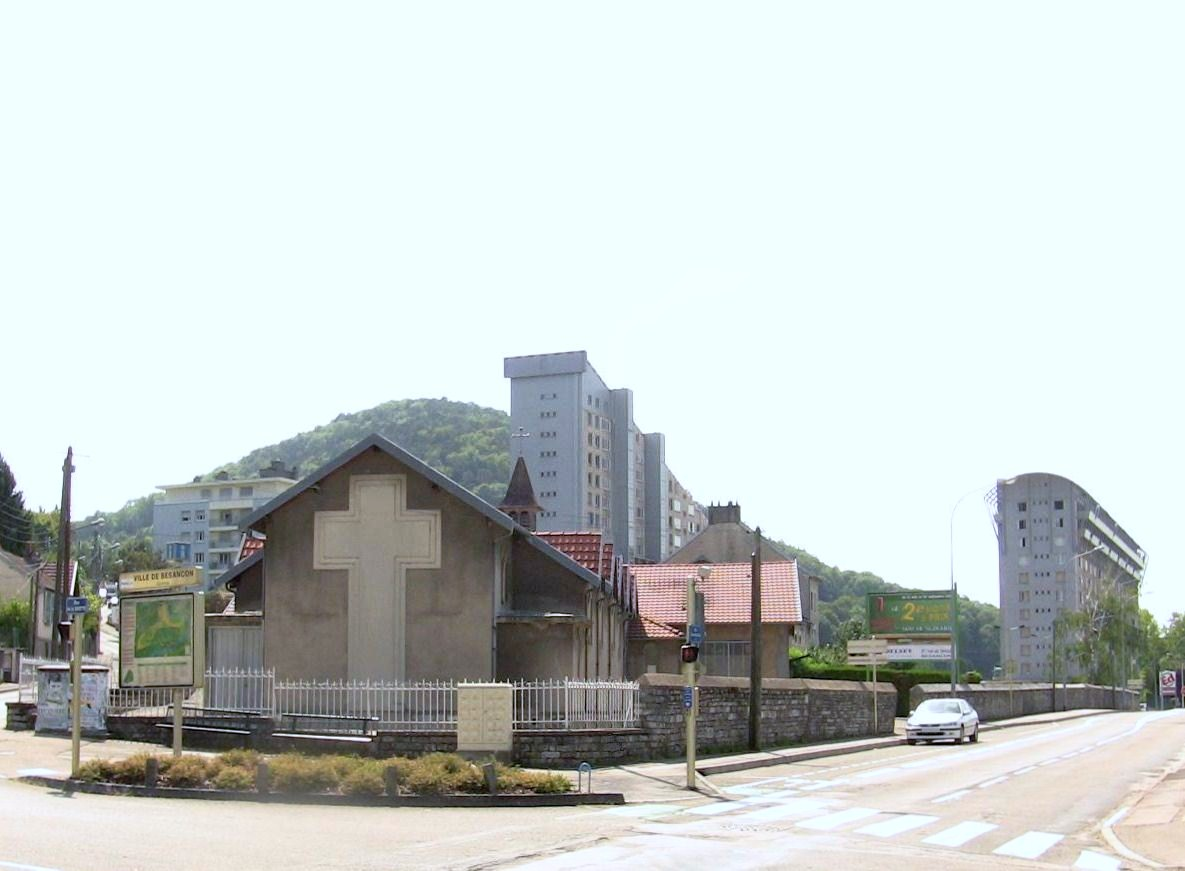
The Sainte-Thérèse Chapel.

Besançon is the seat of the ecclesiastical province of Besançon. The deanery of Besançon is attached to the Archdiocese of Besançon. It comprises six parishes: Saint-François d'Assise (Planoise), Saint-Ferréol (Tilleroyes, La Butte, Velotte), Saint-Étienne (La Boucle, Chapelle des Buis), Saint-Vincent de Paul (Bregille, Vaites, Clairs-Soleils), Sainte-Jeanne-Antide (Palente-Orchamps-Saragosse), and Saint-Jean-Baptiste (Saint-Claude, Campus), two communities of religious brothers (the De La Salle Brothers and the Franciscan fraternity of Notre-Dame des Buis), and eighteen communities of nuns. The traditionalists, meanwhile, have recently acquired the Chapelle de la Visitation de Besançon.

==== Twenty Religious Congregations ====
The Congregation of the Sisters of the Holy Family of Besançon, founded in 1803 by Jeanne-Claude Jacoulet, still exists in 2010. It is this community that built the Sainte-Thérèse Chapel and the kindergarten and primary schools, as well as the private Sainte-Famille college and the private Sainte-Ursule lycée, located in the 408 sector (La Butte). Its motherhouse is located at the Hôtel Bonvalot.

The Roche d'Or community was founded in 1950 in the Velotte district at the request of the Archbishop of Besançon, Bishop Maurice Dubourg. This small Bisontin community, operating on the principle of the Foyers de Charité of Marthe Robin, welcomes about a thousand people each year, Christians or those seeking faith, wishing to discover or rediscover Christianity.

The "Sisters of Charity of Besançon," founded at the end of the 18th century by Jeanne-Antide Thouret, are present in 2010 worldwide to help the poor. On April 11, 1799, the nun founded a small school and a canteen in the heart of the Comtois capital, before leaving in 1810 for Italy to start other foundations. Jeanne Antide Thouret was beatified by Pope Pius XI on May 23, 1926, and then canonized on January 14, 1934.

The other communities of nuns include the Sisters of the Christian Retreat, the Religious of Divine Providence of Ribauvillé, the Sisters of the Holy Heart of Mary, the Sisters Missionaries of Our Lady of Africa, the Sisters of the Alliance, the Sisters of Jesus the Servant, the Daughters of the Holy Heart of Mary, the Dominican Missionaries of the Countryside, the Sisters Hospitaller of the Sacred Heart of Jesus, the Sisters of Saint Ursula of Dole, the Missionary Workers, the Sisters of the Sainte Claire Monastery, the Cistercian Sisters of the Notre-Dame de la Grâce-Dieu Abbey, the Dominicans of Bethany, the Benedictines of the Nans sous Sainte Anne Monastery, and the Carmelites of Franche-Comté.

==== Educational community ====
The city of Besançon has several private Catholic establishments approved by the diocese, such as the private Saint-Joseph vocational lycée located in the La Butte sector, the Notre-Dame - Saint-Jean institution under the tutelage of the "Sisters of Charity of Besançon" located in the Montrapon-Fontaine-Écu sector, or the kindergarten, primary school, and private Sainte-Famille college, as well as the private Sainte-Ursule lycée located in the La Butte sector.

=== Orthodox communities ===
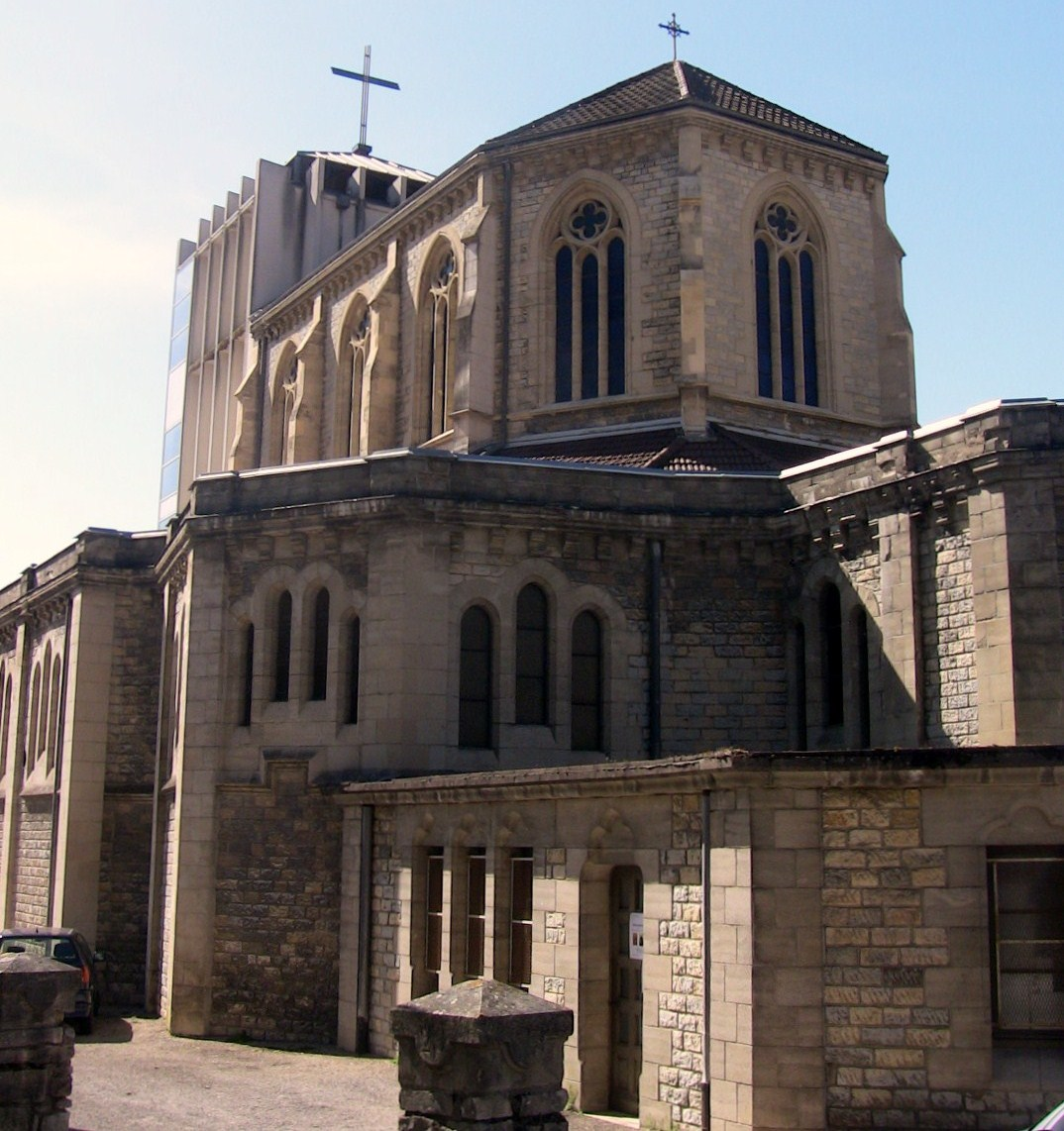
The Sainte Jeanne d'Arc Church, Orthodox section.

The city of Besançon has seen the development since 2006 of an Orthodox parish, with a church set up in a premises located at the back of the Sainte Jeanne d'Arc Church in Bregille. The community, placed under the Protection of the Mother of God and Saint George, is predominantly Franco-Romanian but also includes Slavic, Greek, and Georgian faithful. Services are celebrated in French, with some prayers or hymns said in the languages of the attending faithful. This Orthodox parish is part of the Deanery of France, within the Romanian Orthodox Metropolis of Western and Southern Europe. It is one of the three Orthodox churches in the city.

Additionally, the Saint-Vasilije Ostroski Cudotvorac church, located on Chemin des Quatrouillots in the Saint-Claude district, gathers the community of Serbia origin of the Serbian Orthodox faith. The Saint-Étienne church, on Rue du Grand Charmont in the Battant district, hosts a French-speaking parish, also dependent on the Patriarchate of Serbia.

=== Protestant communities ===
==== Reformed ====
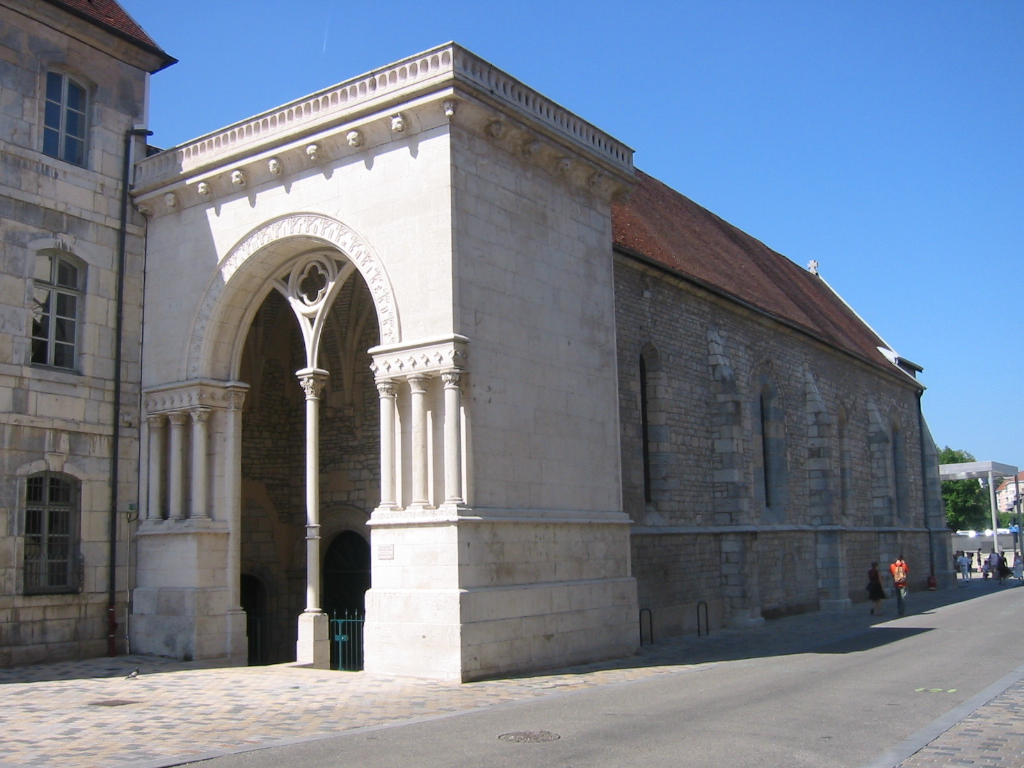
The Temple of the Holy Spirit.

The Protestant Reformed of Besançon have been present in the city since the 16th century, but their community, which numbered only a few members, was not recognized. It was not until the early 19th century that negotiations were initiated between the Protestants and the city, and on January 6, 1805, they acquired the former Capuchin chapel, called the Chamars temple, as a place of worship.

However, the building had to close its doors, and the last service was celebrated on April 24, 1842, as the chapel was to be repurposed by the city for the artillery arsenal. Thus, the former chapel of the Hospitaliers du Saint-Esprit was offered to the Protestants of Besançon as a new place of worship, after the city restored the building. In 1842, the city ceded the chapel, along with the adjacent tower of the former hospital, to the Protestant community, and on April 28, 1842, the dedication of the Temple of the Holy Spirit, 5 Rue Goudimel, was celebrated. A Protestant chapel of the hospice, 132 Rue de Belfort.

==== Evangelicals ====
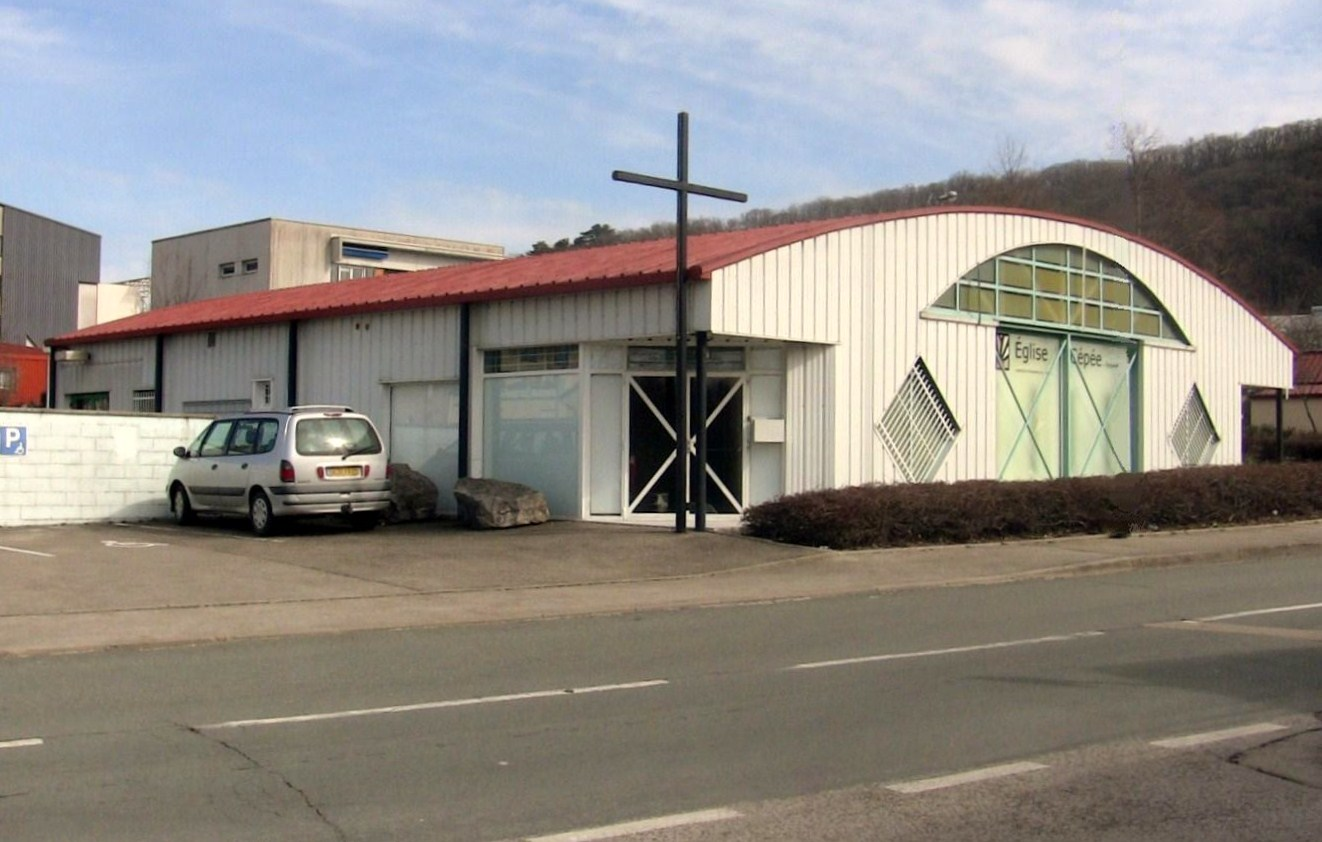
The Cépée Church.

The city of Besançon has two major evangelical communities: the Pentecost of Besançon, 4 Rue Larmet, (approximately 450 to 500 members), and the CÉPÉE Protestant Evangelical Church, 1 Rue Blaise Pascal, (between 50 and 100 members). There are also seven other evangelical groups, generally very small structures: the Assemblies of God France (Pentecostal) located at 124 Rue de Belfort in Orchamps, a branch of the Assemblies of Brethren (Evangelical) located on Rue de Beauregard in Chaprais, a branch of the Timothée Mission (Evangelical) located on Rue Georges Cuvier in La Butte, an evangelical Baptist church (Baptism) located at 175 Rue de Belfort in Orchamps, an independent evangelical Protestant church (Evangelical) located on Rue Charles Fourier in city center, an evangelical Protestant church known as the Good News (Evangelical) located at 13 Rue Xavier Marmier in Butte, a Christian Assembly church located at 11 Rue Chopard, the University Evangelical Home (FEU) located at 49 Rue des Granges, and a branch of the Seventh-day Adventist Church (Adventist) located on Rue de Trey in Montrapon-Fontaine-Écu.

=== Other Christian movements ===
==== Church of Jesus Christ of Latter-day Saints ====
On December 31, 1929, Besançon became one of the cities open to preaching, and in the early 1930s, Mormon missionaries, 3 Boulevard Diderot, part of the Switzerland district, were sent to establish temples in Besançon. Although some difficulties emerged even then, it was the rise of Nazism and the Second World War that prompted the Mormons to massively leave France, returning after the war ended. Today, there is a Mormon center in Franche-Comté located on Boulevard Diderot in the Chaprais sector, with about 150 adherents.

==== Jehovah's Witnesses ====
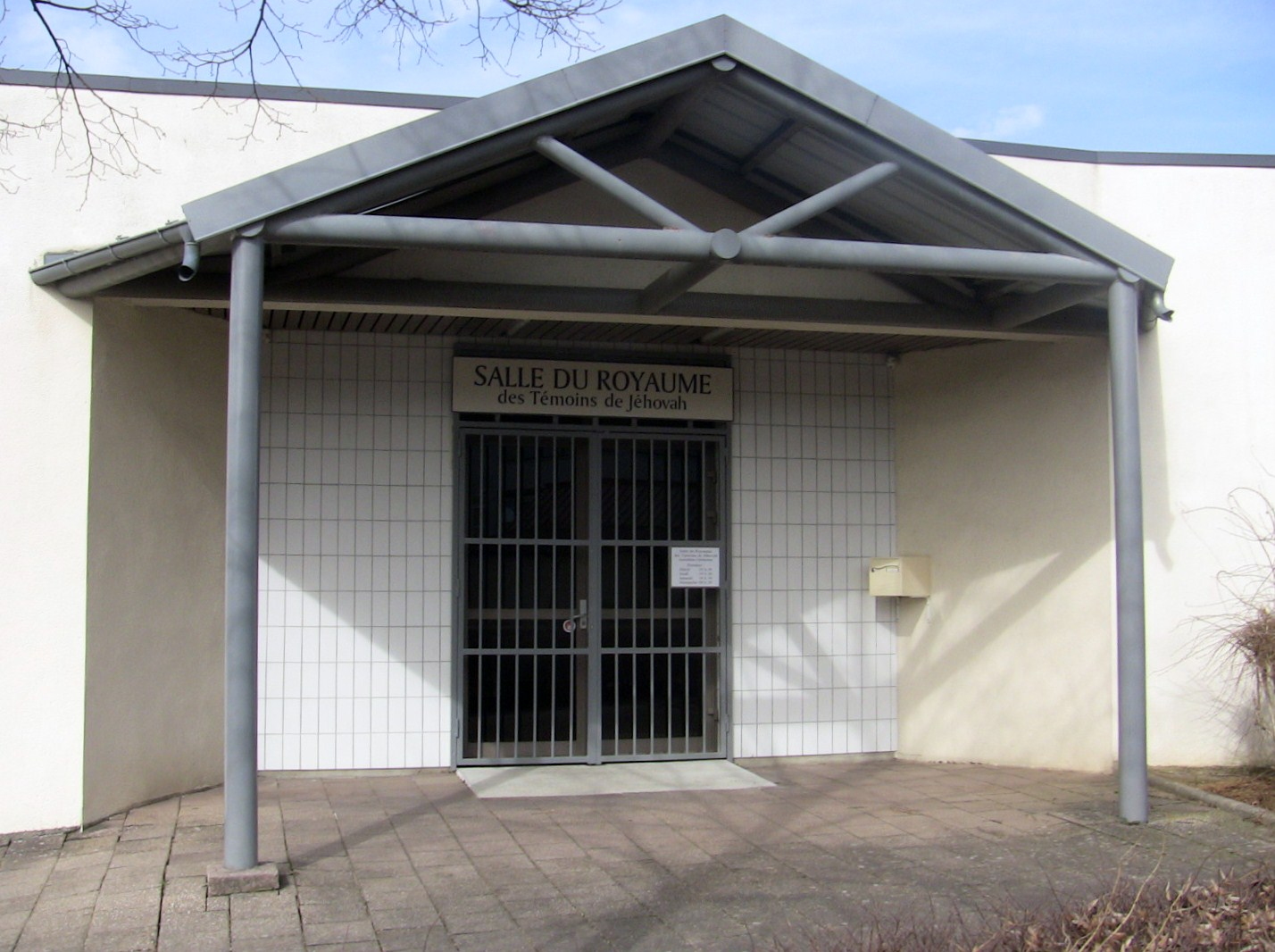
Kingdom Hall of Jehovah's Witnesses.

Since the early 2000s, the Jehovah's Witnesses have had a place of worship (Kingdom Hall) located on Rue Blaise-Pascal, in the heart of the Planoise district. An anecdote recounts that a hermit, a former Jehovah's Witness missionary, nicknamed the hermit of the citadel, lived in the Chapelle des Buis sector. After a fire ravaged his hermitage, an incredible outpouring of generosity from the Bisontins allowed this man to resume his former life, specifying in an interview that he had been living as a hermit for 16 years.

== Religious infrastructure and furniture ==
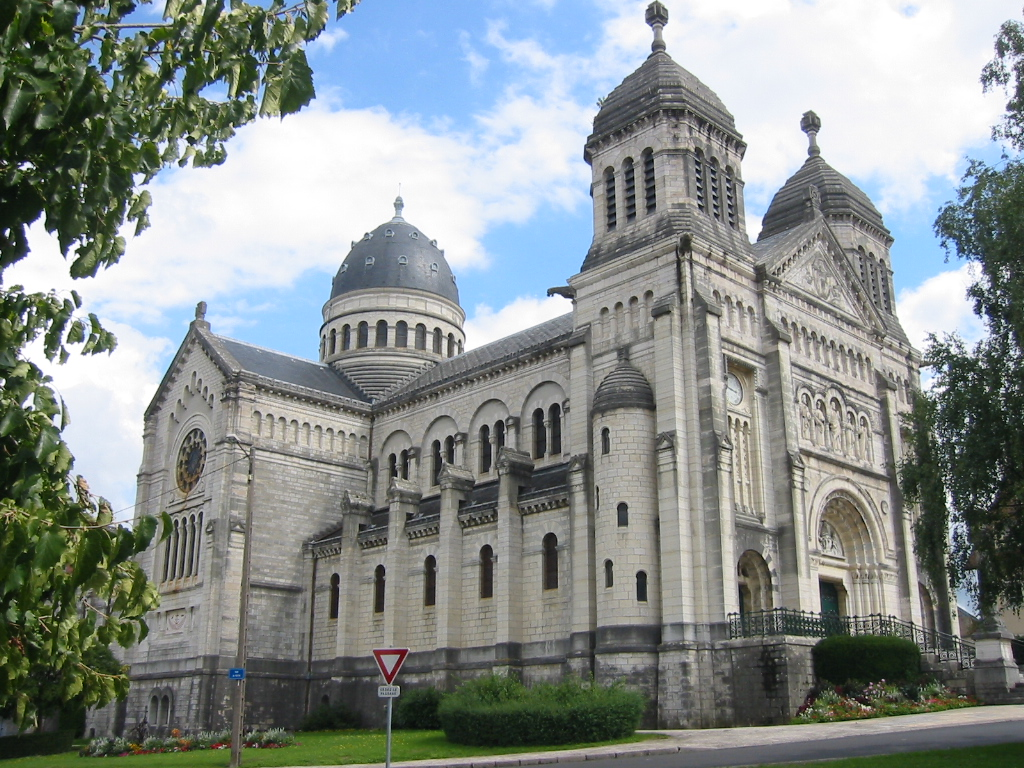
The current Basilica of Saint-Ferjeux.

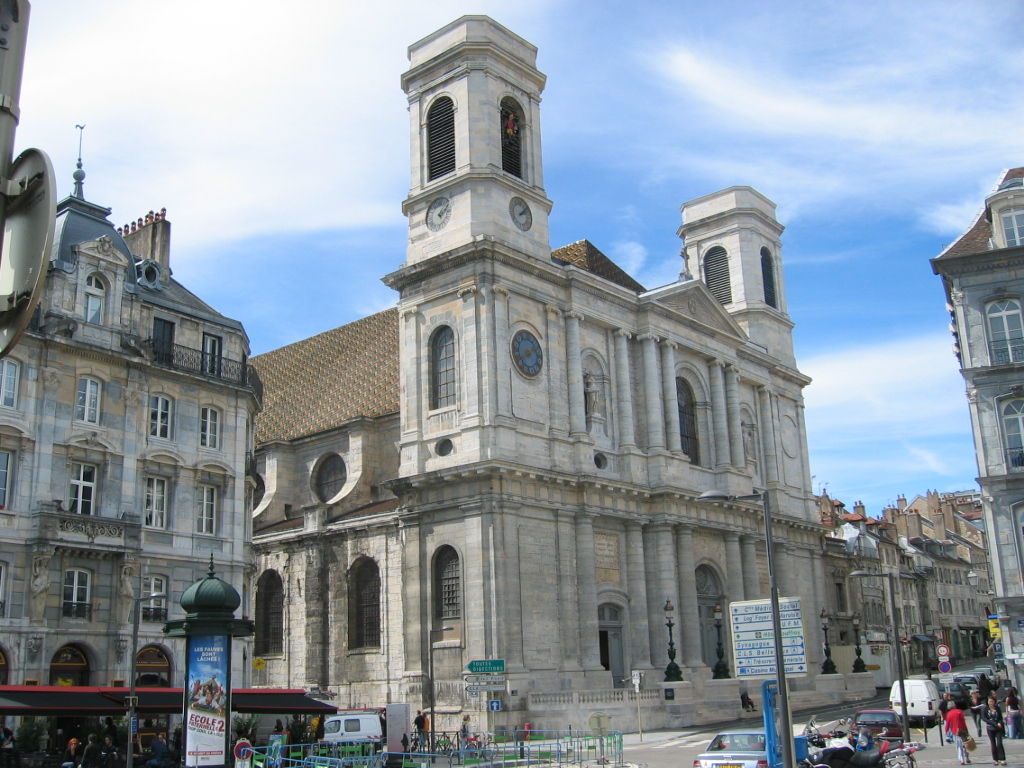
The Church of Sainte-Madeleine.

The Cathedral of Saint John was for a time one of the only Christian buildings in the city, but it was soon joined by many other places of worship. The second among them appears to be a church dedicated to Saint Ferjeux and his brother Saint Ferréol, built above the very cave where the two saints rested, but it was demolished to allow the construction of the Basilica of Saint-Ferjeux between 1881 and 1901. A Saint-Quentin church was built on the current Victor-Hugo square around 1040 before disappearing during the French Revolution. Many other buildings were also constructed, such as the Church of Saint-Maurice and the Church of Saint-Pierre in the 4th century, the Abbey of Saint-Paul in the 7th century, the Church of Notre-Dame between 1080 and 1085, or the Hermitage of the Buis attested in the 13th century. The first Bisontin church dedicated to Saint Martin was once located in the district of Bregille, and is believed to have been founded as early as the 6th century. Rebuilt several times, it was definitively destroyed during the siege of Besançon by the army of Liechtenstein, on 2. General Marulaz made the highly controversial decision to completely raze the district of Bregille along with its church and adjacent cemetery. The current Church of Saint-Martin was built starting in 1821 based on plans by the architect Lapret, on the place known as the "Pater", in the heart of the Chaprais district. It was built near the Chaprais cemetery that already existed, and was therefore named the Church of Saint-Martin of Chaprais to distinguish it from the former Church of Saint-Martin of Bregille.

Between the 13th and 17th centuries, very few places of worship were built, except for the Grand Seminary of Besançon from 1670 to 1695, the Church of Saint-François-Xavier in 1680. The abbatial church of the Great Carmelites dates from the 15th century, and the Church of Saint-Étienne is likely older. It was not until the 18th century that new buildings emerged, notably a large number of chapels in the La Boucle sector. Buildings such as the Church of Sainte-Madeleine or the Church of Saint-Hippolyte and some other churches were modified or completely rebuilt. The Basilica of Saint-Ferjeux was built at the end of the 19th century, and the Church of Sainte-Jeanne-d'Arc as well as the Church of the Sacred Heart at the beginning of the 20th century. With the urban expansion of the 1960s, chapels and churches appeared in new districts, such as the Church of Saint-Paul of Clairs-Soleils (1965), the Church of Notre-Dame du Foyer in Cras, and the Church of Saint-Louis of Montrapon-Fontaine-Écu (1967) and the Cépée Church of Planoise (1972 and 2000s). Today, Besançon has about twenty churches still in operation and thirty others that are disused or destroyed.

=== Artistic heritage ===
The ornamental heritage of Besançon is a significant testament to the strong Christian faith of the city's inhabitants. Indeed, a large number of streets and buildings, particularly in the districts of La Boucle and Battant, feature statues or engravings representing religious icons. It is not uncommon to see the Virgin Mary, angels, saints, or crucifixes. These can be found in Velotte, notably near the cemetery, along Rue de Dole, and within certain buildings, such as the statue of Saint James at the heart of the Saint-Jacques Hospital or at the Salins de Bregille. Near the Temple of the Holy Spirit, one can see a masterpiece of sculpture: a portal adorned with a sculpted allegory representing charity in the form of a mother accompanied by her children, created by the artist Perrette. At the base of this sculpture is engraved Psalm 26: "If my father and mother forsake me, the Lord will take me up".Brochure published by the city of Besançon, cultural action and communications service, 2003. Besides statues and engravings, the fountain of Velotte is topped with a crucifix.

The main churches of the city are replete with exceptional works, particularly paintings. Thus, the Cathedral of Saint John preserves no fewer than 35 paintings classified as historical monuments, including masterpieces by artists Fra Bartolomeo, Jean-François de Troy, Charles-Joseph Natoire, and Charles André van Loo. Other remarkable paintings are also preserved in the Church of Sainte-Madeleine, such as La Sainte-Famille, Sainte Madeleine aux pieds du Christ, Sainte Philomène de Baudot, in the Church of Notre-Dame where Notre-Dame Libératrice and Sainte Philomène conduite au martyre are hung, and even in the small Church of Saint-Hippolyte of Velotte where three monumental canvases can be seen. The Musée des Beaux-Arts et d'Archéologie de Besançon also holds some fine pieces, notably the prestigious painting Deposition of Christ by Bronzino.

=== Comtois Bell Towers ===
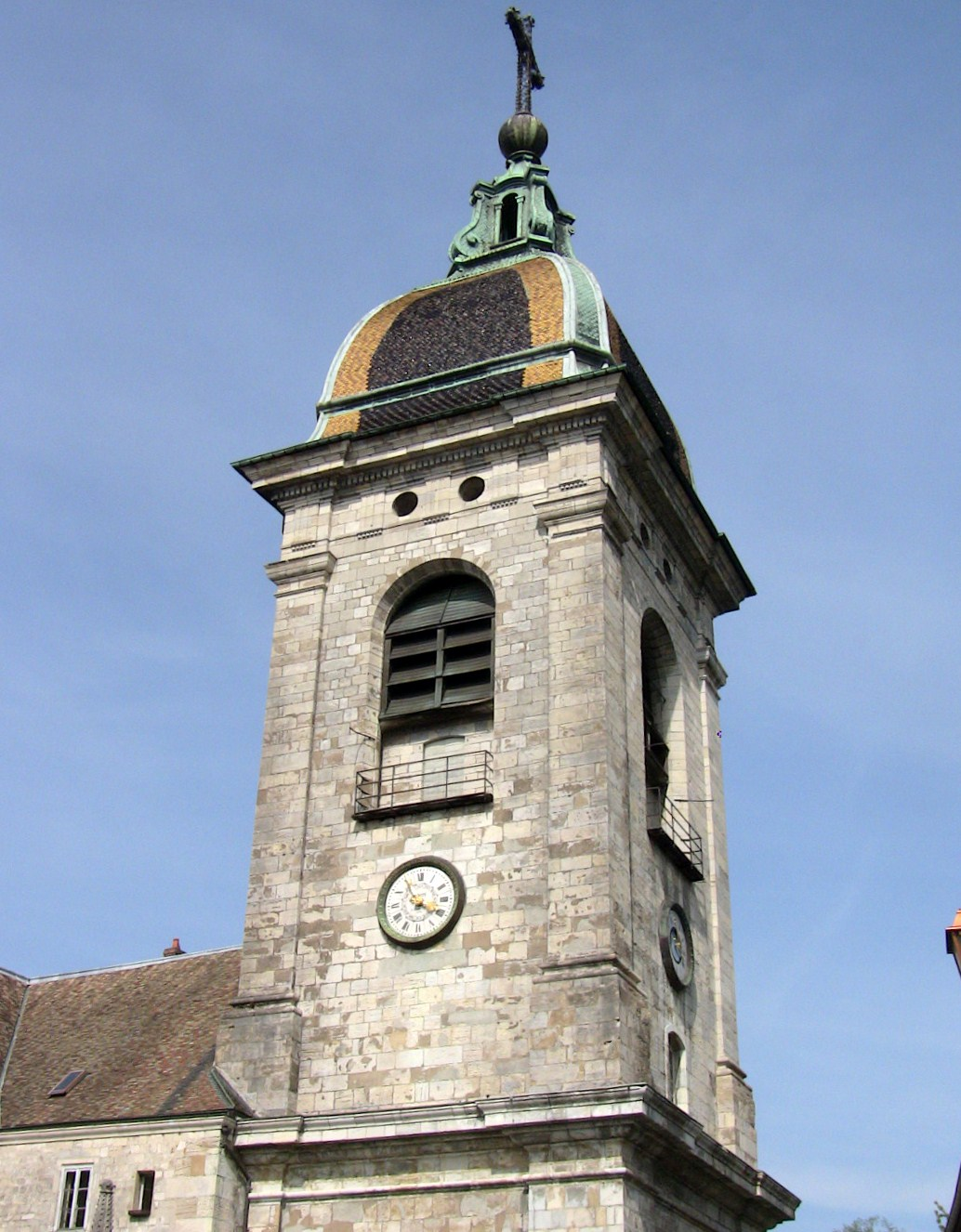
Domed imperial bell tower.

This form, known as imperial, originated in the city of Florence in Italy in the 14th and 15th centuries. Its true rise in Franche-Comté followed the Franche-Comté Ten Years' War to address the destruction of many religious buildings, and the enthusiasm generated by its original shape made it a symbol of the region's religious architecture. However, few religious buildings in Besançon feature such a bell tower; only the Cathedral of Saint John and the Palais Granvelle have one. Nevertheless, Franche-Comté boasts no fewer than 655 bell towers of this type.

=== The Holy Shroud ===
The Holy Shroud of Besançon bore the imprint of a naked, tortured man, from the front. The back left no trace.

It is first mentioned in 1523. According to some authors, it is likely or possibly a copy of the one in Turin, which was in the region between 1418 and 1452. According to another theory, it could be the shroud that Othon de la Roche stole during the sack of Constantinople and sent in 1208 to his father, Pons II de La Roche, to donate to the Besançon church. However, it is impossible for Pons, who died in 1203, to have participated in this transfer.

It was moved in 1528 to a chapel in the St. Stephen's Cathedral, then transferred in 1669 to the new Cathedral of Saint John. The shroud was the object of significant worship in the 17th century, a period of wars (Thirty Years' War, annexations, and withdrawals by France) and plague. During the city's capitulation to French armies in 1674, the only condition imposed was to preserve this relic.

During the French Revolution, the Holy Shroud of Besançon was sent to Paris on 27 Floréal Year II, "with the mold used to renew the imprint each year," according to the minutes of the Convention of 5 Prairial Year II (Moniteur de 1794, page 557). It was then destroyed. A representation of it can be found on the stained glass windows of the Pérolles chapel in Fribourg, Switzerland, dating from 1520. On the window, the Besançon canons, privileged to wear the episcopal mitre, hold the cloth before the crowd. The cloth bears the double image, very similar to that of the Shroud of Turin.

== Notable figures ==
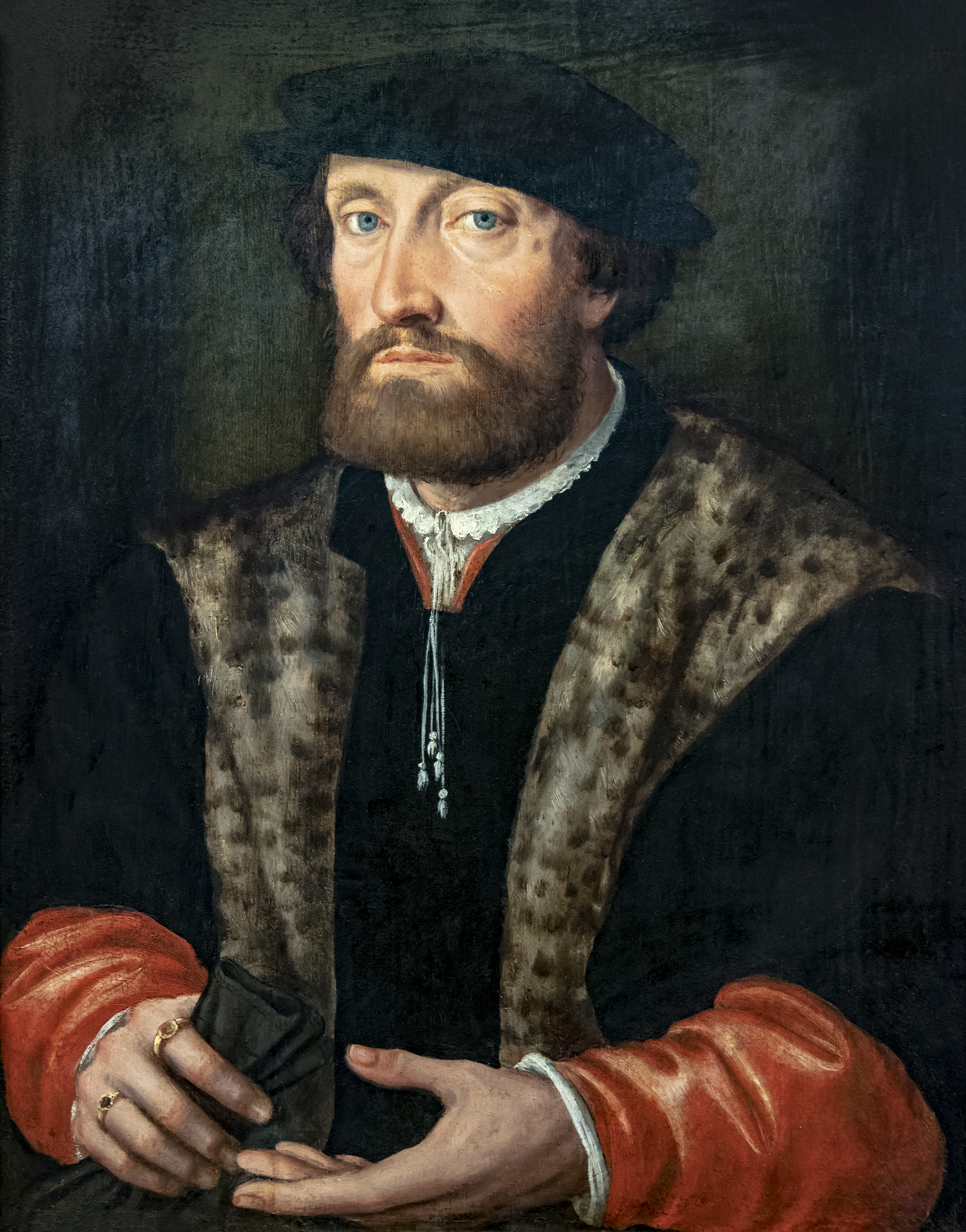
The cardinal Antoine Perrenot de Granvelle

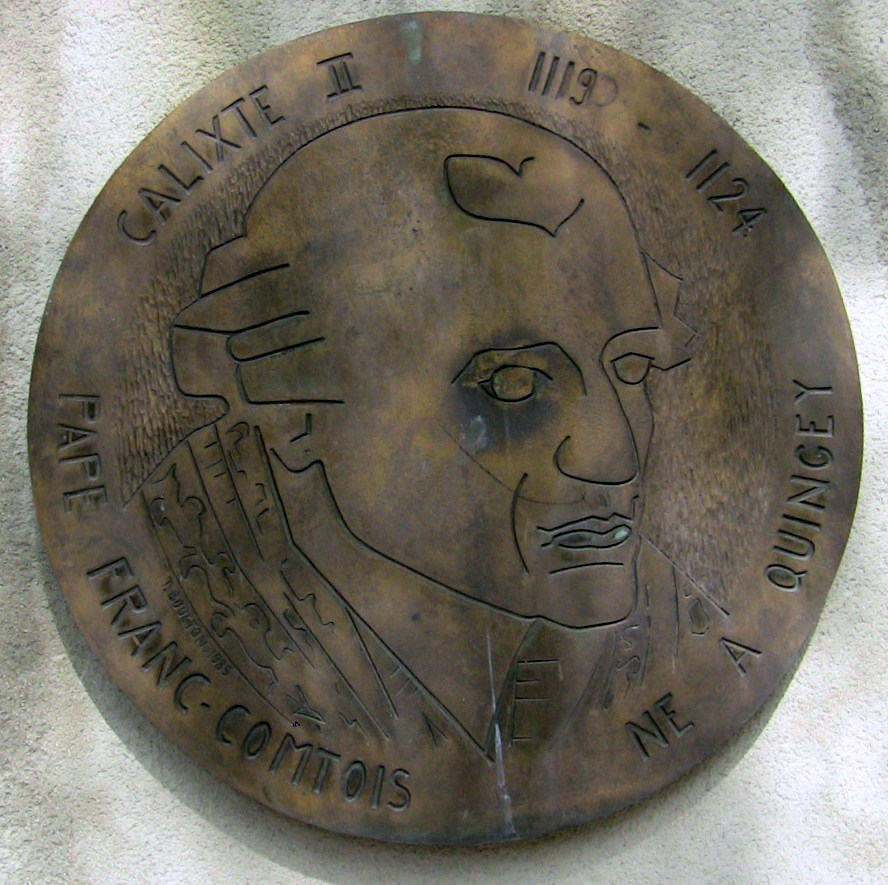
Plaque of Callixtus II near the Cathedral of Saint John.

The first known bishop of the city is attested in 346: it is Pancharius, whom an episcopal catalog names in sixth place, placing the first bishop of Besançon, Linus, around the mid-3rd century. Many other archbishops followed, among the most famous being Claudius of Besançon, Donatus of Besançon, Bishop Bernoin, Hugues I of Salins, Cardinal Antoine Perrenot de Granvelle, Louis William Valentine DuBourg, and Cardinal Charles-Henri-Joseph Binet, not to mention Pope Callixtus II, born in Quingey in 1124, who was archbishop of the city and a fervent defender of the Saint John chapter. Also, Saint Gerland of Agrigento, a native of the city and bishop of Agrigento in 1088. François Bonvalot was a 16th-century religious figure who notably served as administrator of the diocese of Besançon. The archdeacon of Besançon and Renaissance humanist Ferry Carondelet held high positions under Pope Julius II and in the service of Margaret of Austria. It was thanks to Abbot Jean-Baptiste Boisot that the municipal library of the city acquired several remarkable private collections from the Saint-Vincent Abbey in 1694.

Claude-Adrien Nonnotte (born in Besançon on July 29, 1711, and died in the same city on September 3, 1793) was a Jesuit, a fervent opponent of Voltaire. Sister Marcelle Baverez and Abbot Robert Bourgeois were two resistants who died in deportation. The current archbishop of the city is André Jean René Lacrampe, in office since June 13, 2003. Abbot Jean Garneret (1907–2002), born in Clerval in the Doubs, was a writer-philosopher who pursued his religious studies at the Grand Seminary of Besançon. Finally, there are also Saint Joseph Marchand and Étienne-Théodore Cuenot, missionaries in Vietnam.

== See also ==
- History of Christianity in France
- Archdiocese of Besançon
- Besançon Cathedral

== Bibliography ==
- Tonon, Hector; Culot, Jean-François; Henckel, Marie-Édith; Mathieu, Annie; Mathieu, Jacques; Bidalot, Georges; Bévalot, Jacqueline; Broquet, Paul; Monti, Jean-Claude; Porro, Anne; Breton, Jacques; Grappin, Jean-Claude; Bréchat, Pierre-Louis; Mercier, Yves; Riobé, Pierre (2009). Mémoires de Bregille [Memories of Bregille] (in French) (2nd ed.). Besançon: Cêtre. p. 312. ISBN 978-2-87823-196-0.
- Bevalot, René (1995). Planoise... Vous connaissez ? [Planoise... Do You Know It?] (in French). p. 117.
- de Vregille, Bernard; Vergnolle, Éliane; Deridder, Annick; Brunet, Pascal; Gavinet, Jean-Pierre; Chauve, Pierre (2006). La cathédrale Saint-Jean de Besançon [The Cathedral of Saint John in Besançon] (in French). Besançon: Les cahiers de la Renaissance du vieux Besançon. p. 100. ISSN 1276-6771.
- Fohlen, Claude (1994). Histoire de Besançon [History of Besançon] (in French). Vol. 1. Cêtre. ISBN 2-901040-21-7.
- Gavignet, Jean-Pierre; Estavoyer, Lyonel (1989). Besançon autrefois [Besançon in the Past] (in French). Le Coteau: Horvath. p. 175. ISBN 2-7171-0685-5.
- Borgé, Jacques; Viasnoff, Nicolas (1996). Archives de la Franche-Comté [Archives of Franche-Comté] (in French). Mantes-la-Jolie: M. Trinckvel. p. 203. ISBN 2-85132-075-0.
- Beauquier, Charles (1900). Traditions populaires. Les mois en Franche-Comté [Popular Traditions. The Months in Franche-Comté] (in French). Paris: E. Lechevalier. p. 183.
- Coindre, Gaston (1979). Mon vieux Besançon [My Old Besançon] (in French). Besançon: Jacques et Demontrond, Cêtre. pp. III volumes, de 510 à 1062.
- Druhen, Maxime (1987) [1910]. Besançon disparu [Vanished Besançon] (in French). Jacques et Demontrond. p. 60. ISBN 978-2-9501951-0-4.
