= La Butte (Besançon) =

Sector of Besançon

Coordinates: 47°14′3″N 6°0′39″E

Butte is a sector of Besançon, located in the center of the city.

== Geography ==
The area is located near the historical center, near Grette and Saint-Ferjeux

== Education ==
- Public Kindergarten of Butte
- Public Primary School of Butte
- Lyceum of Jules Haag

== Buildings military ==
- The barracks Joffre
- The barracks Brown

== Administrative Buildings ==
- Prison of Besançon
- Chamber of Commerce and Industry of Doubs
- Departmental Directorate of Equipment
- Polyclinic storks
- Harass National
- Postal sorting center
- Municipal workshops

== Transport ==
The sector is served by the line 1, 6 and 27

== See also ==
- Grette
- The 408

== Sources ==
- French page about Butte
