= Orchamps (Besançon) =

Neighbourhood in Besançon, France

Coordinates: 47°15′40″N 6°02′22″E

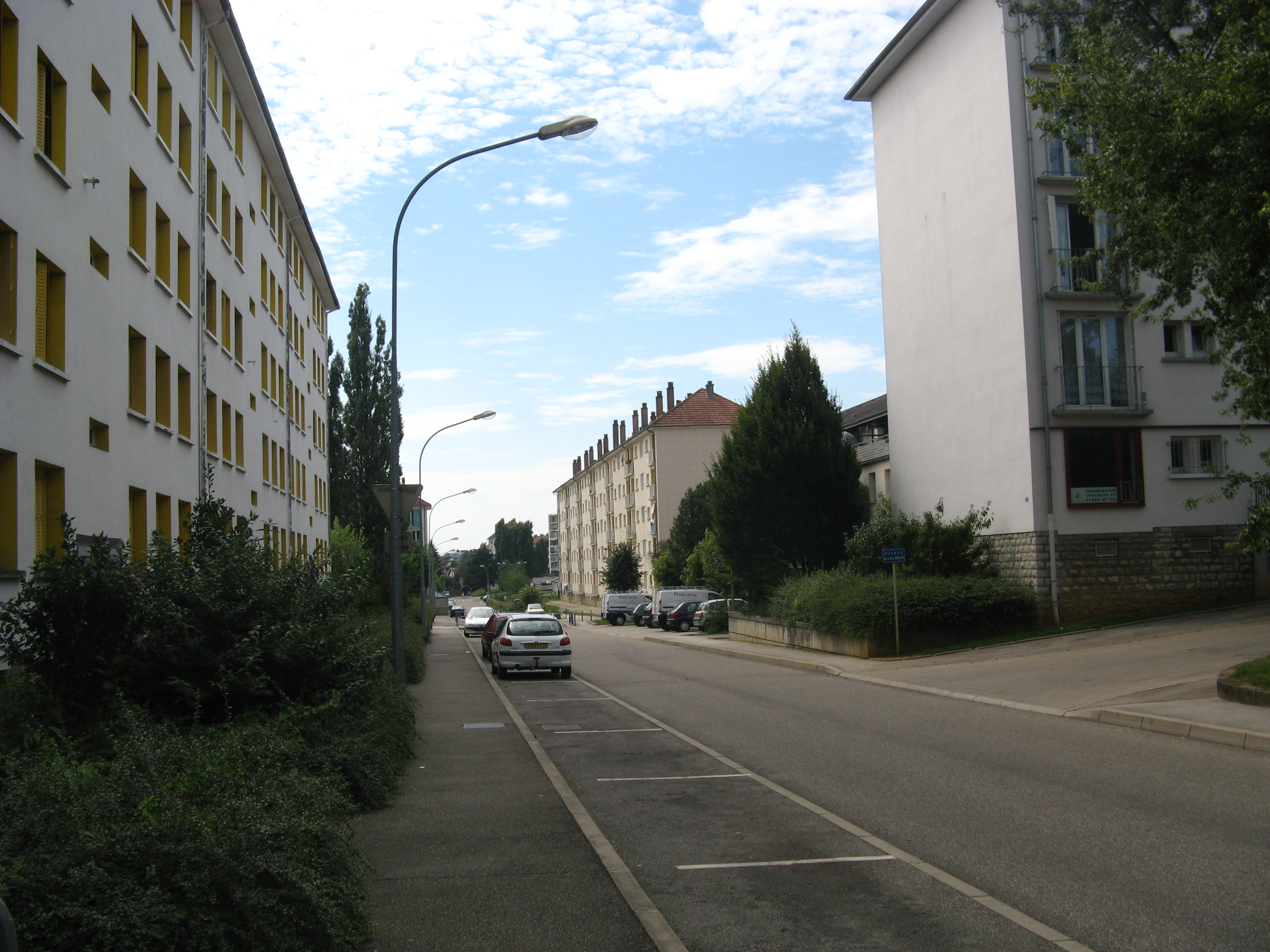
A view of Orchamps

Orchamps is a neighbourhood in the south-east of the city of Besançon, France. Like nearby Clairs-Soleils and Planoise, to the west of the city, Orchamps was built in the late 1960s. It is situated close to Bregille.
