= The 408 =

Coordinates: 47.234°N 6.011°E

The 408 (French: les quatre-cents huit) is a sector of Besançon. Like Planoise and Clairs-Soleils, The 408 has a notoriety for crime. It is sometimes viewed as a sub-sector of Grette.

== Etymology ==
The name "Grette" takes its name from the French verb "gratter", meaning to scrape at the Earth and remove the rocks in order to cultivate the land.

== History ==
The first mention of the neighborhood comes from 1544 as "Gratte sous Chamdianne" (Grette sous Chaudanne).

From 1959 to 1962 the 408 was built, its name given by the population of Besançon to label the three apartment blocks, of which the first two amounted to 408 apartments, before the construction of the third was completed. The third block brought the total number to 588, however, "The 408" stuck. In 1968 the street near to The 408 was widened into a boulevard, to be called the Boulevard de la Grette. It is now known as the Avenue François-Mitterrand, and connects Planoise through the 408 to the city center.
