= Grette =

The Grette (French pronunciation: [ɡʁɛt]) is a little area of Besançon, located near the center of the city.

== Etymology ==
The name "Grette" comes from the verb "gratter", meaning "to scrape" and refers to the removal of stones from the ground before it can be cultivated.

== History ==
The first mention of the name "greete" was in 1544. In the 1950s, a few buildings were built.

== Geography ==
The sector is located near the historical center of Besançon, between Butte, Velotte and Saint-Ferjeux. The river Doubs is one hundred meters from the area.

== Education ==
- Veilles Perrières public kindergarten
- Public Primary School of Grette
- Veilles Perrières Public Primary School

== Shops ==
- Hairdresser
- Beerhouse

== Place of worship ==
- Chapel of Saint-Thérése

== Military Buildings ==
- Military barracks of Ruty

== Other administrative buildings ==
- 1901 center, an association

== Roads ==
- The principal road is the avenue of François Mitterrand, linking the district to Planoise.
- Polygon Street links the area to the Butte.

== Transport ==
The Ginko company (bus) manages urban transport in the city.

- Week and days: lines 1, 3, 5 and 10
- Evenings and Sundays: line A

== See also ==
- The 408
- Butte
- Planoise
