= Chapelle des Buis =

Hamlet in eastern France

Coordinates: 47°13′06″N 6°02′48″E

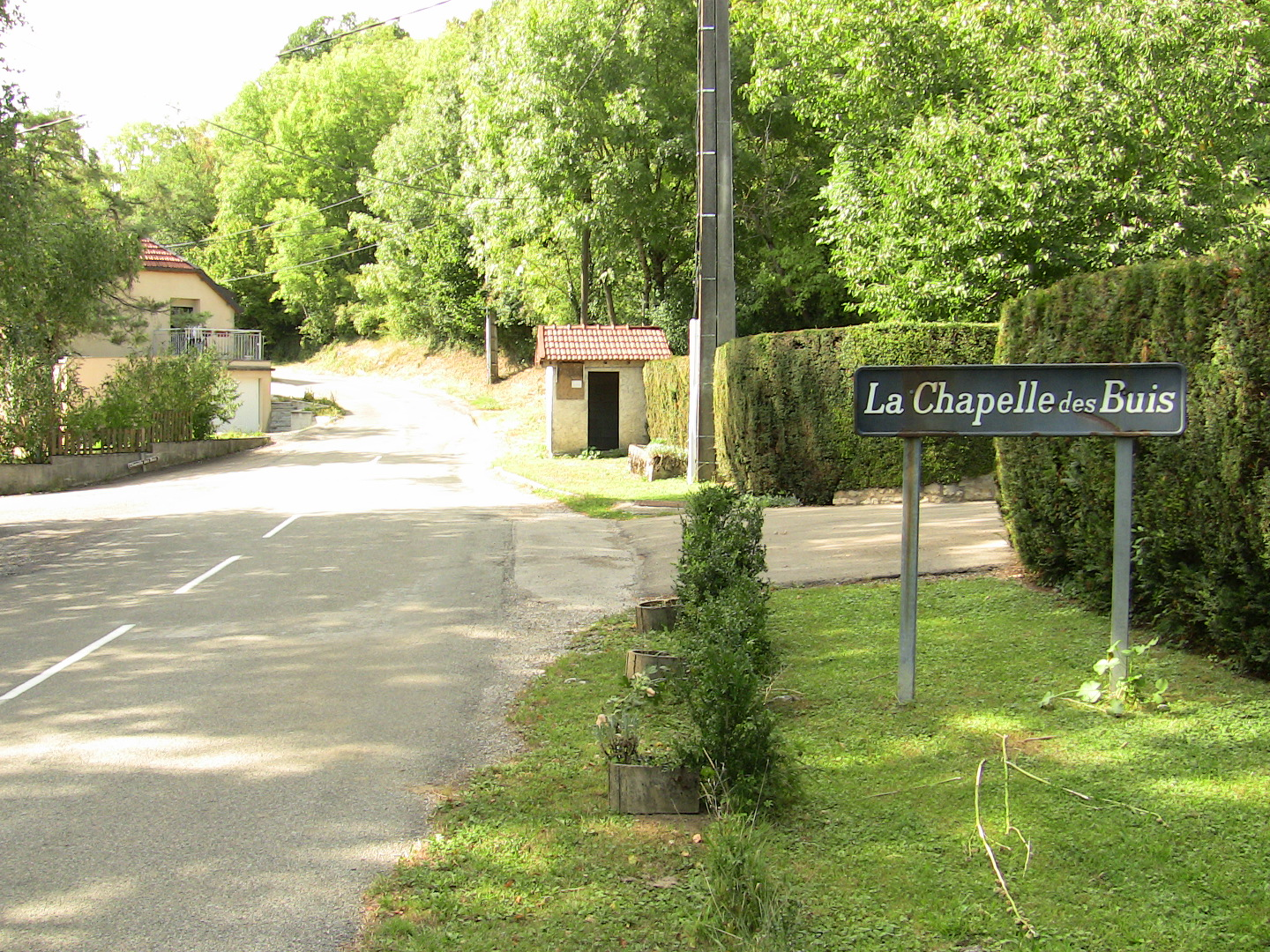
Road sign announcing the entrance in the hamlet of « Chapelle des Buis »

Chapelle des Buis is a hamlet south of the city of Besançon, in eastern France. It straddles the area of three communes: Besançon, Fontain and Morre. The church of Our Lady of Liberation is nearby.
