= Our Lady of Liberation =

Coordinates: 47°13′11″N 6°03′05″E

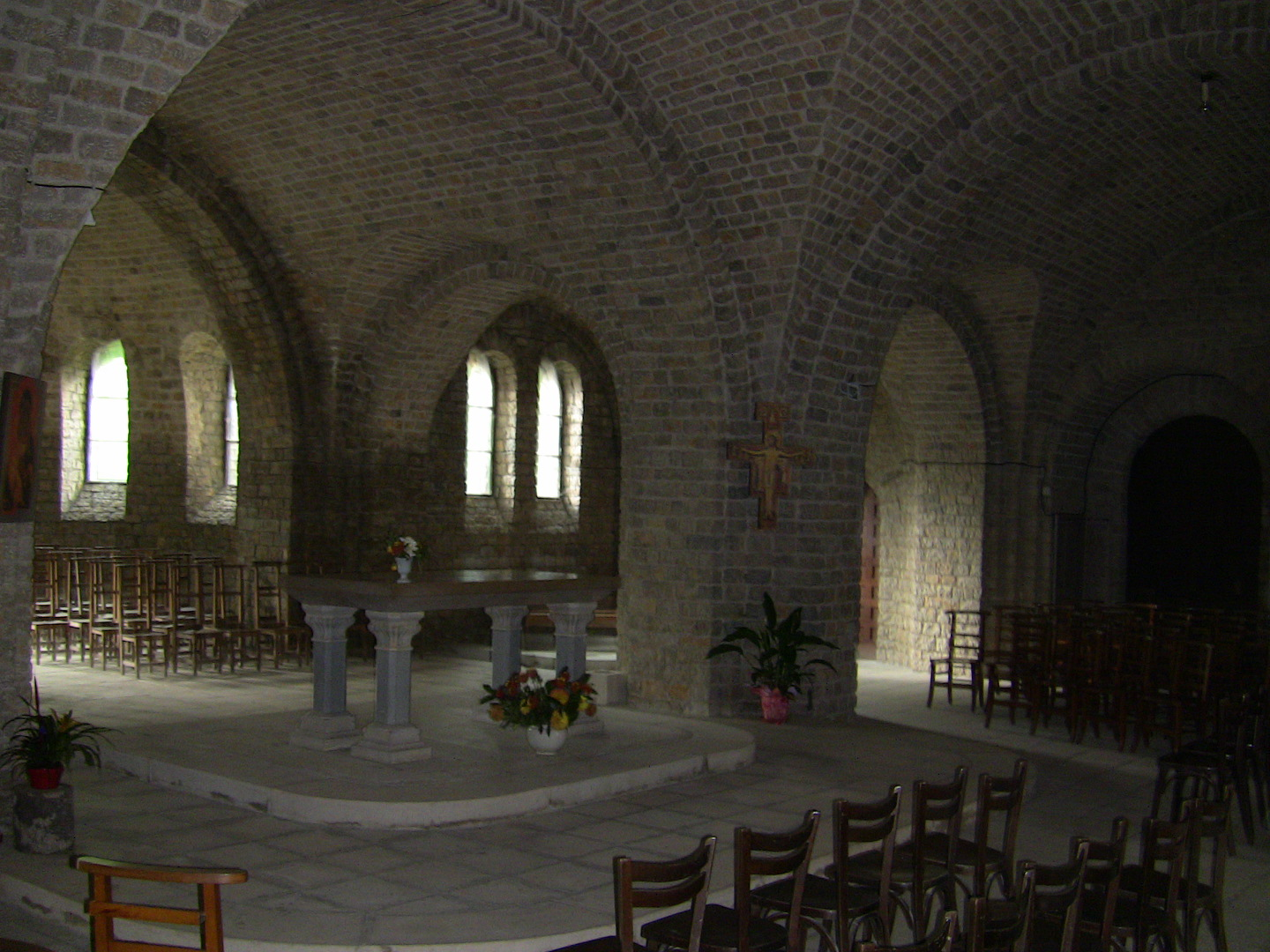
Interior of the monument

Our Lady of Liberation is a church built in an old fort at nearly 500 m of altitude near the hamlet of Chapelle des Buis, in the outskirts of the city of Besançon, in the department of Doubs, in eastern France.

== History ==
Our Lady of Liberation was dedicated after the Second World War by Bishop Maurice-Louis Dubourg, who decided to build a monument if Besançon was not devastated by the bombing. Subsequently, plaques lining the walls of the building were added to pay homage to diocesans and all inhabitants of Besançon who died during World War II, as well as a monumental statue of the Virgin Mary 7 m tall.
