= Saint-Ferjeux (Besançon) =

District of Besançon, France

Coordinates: 47°13′59″N 5°59′25″E

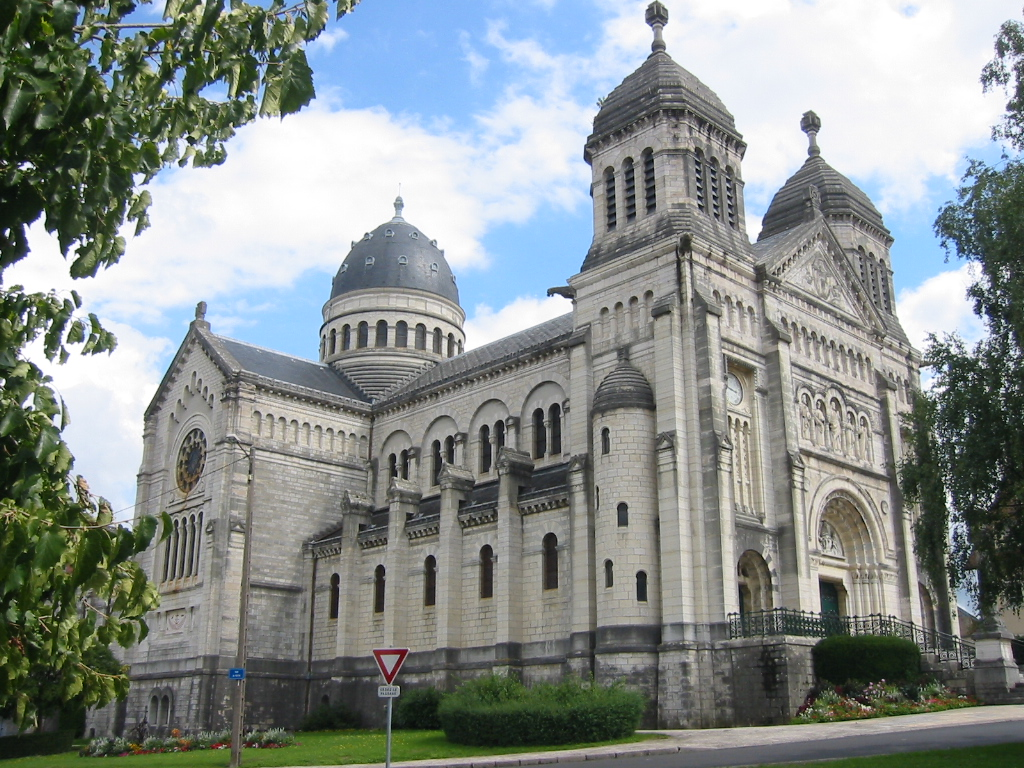
Basilique Saint-Ferjeux

Saint-Ferjeux (French pronunciation: [sɛ̃ fɛʁʒø]) is a district of Besançon located to the west of the city.

== Geography ==
The sector is located to the west of the city, near Planoise, Tilleroyes and Grette

== Monuments ==
- Basilique Saint-Ferjeux
- Cemetery

== Education ==
- Primary Public School Sapins

== Transports ==
- Lines 1, 3, 10, 20 and 27 serve the area
