= Les Clairs-Soleils =

Area in Besançon, France

Coordinates: 47.2489°N 6.05385°E

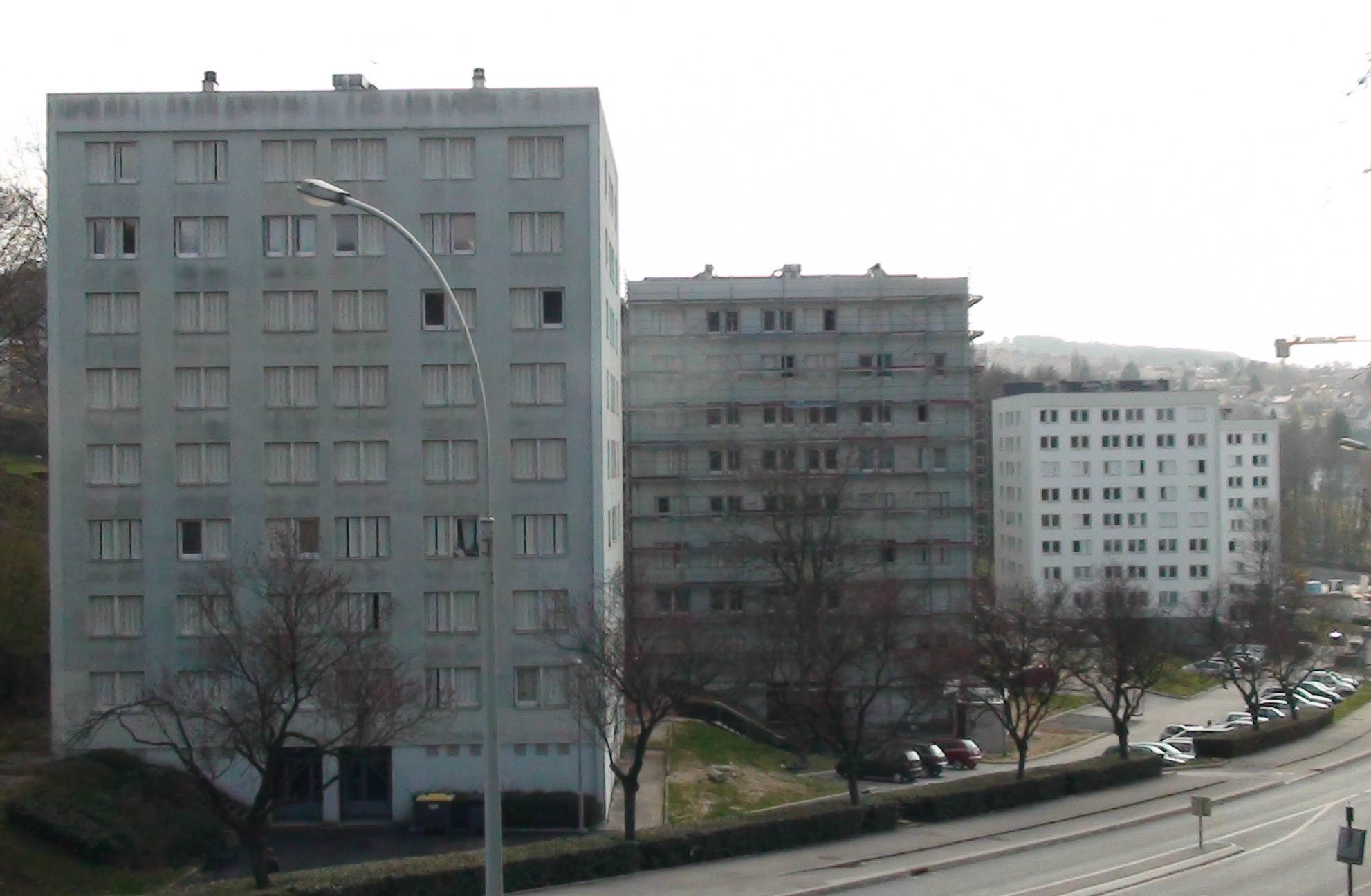
Clairs Soleils in 2009

Clairs-Soleils is a small area on Besançon's east side, near the quarters of Bregille and Orchamps. The quarter has about 3000 inhabitants.

== History ==
Like Planoise, Clairs-Soleils was built in response Besançon's rapid population growth. Since the 1990s, Clairs-Soleils has come to bear the nickname "little Chicago" in reference to its high crime rate.

== Buildings and monuments ==
- Martin Luther King center
- Library
- Nursery

== Church ==
- Church of Saint-Paul

== Shops ==
- Pharmacy
- Bakery
- Office of Tobacco
- Kebab shop

== Sport ==
- Clairs-Soleils football club

== Education ==
- Jean Macé kindergarten
- Raymond Vauthier kindergarten
- Jean Macé public primary school
- College of Clairs-Soleils

== Transport ==
- Only line number 7 serves the area

== Famous inhabitants ==
- Sofiane Hakkar, a French karate champion

== See also ==
- Besançon
- Planoise

== Notes and references ==
- French page about Clairs-Soleils
