= De Lasteyrie =

De Lasteyrie may refer to:

- Jules de Lasteyrie (1810–1883), an owner of the Château de la Grange-Bléneau
- Count Guy de Lasteyrie (1879–1944), a member of the de Lasteyrie nobility
- Robert de Lasteyrie (1849–1921), an art historian and politician
- Charles de Lasteyrie (1877–1936), a French banker and politician
- Ferdinand de Lasteyrie (1810–1879), a French politician
- Charles Philibert de Lasteyrie (1759–1849), a French agronomist, lithographer and philanthropist
