= Quicherat =

Quicherat is a surname. Notable people with the surname include:

- Louis-Marie Quicherat (1799–1884), French Latinist
- Jules Quicherat (1814–1882), French historian and archaeologist, brother of Louis
