= Baku (mythology) =

Japanese supernatural beings

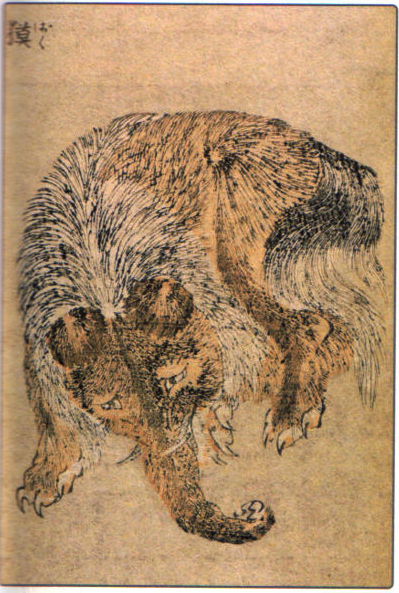
A baku, as illustrated by Hokusai.

Baku (獏 or 貘) are Japanese supernatural beings that are said to devour nightmares. They originate from the Chinese Mo. According to legend, they were created by the spare pieces that were left over when the gods finished creating all other animals. They have a long history in Japanese folklore and art, and more recently have appeared in manga and anime.

The Japanese term baku has two current meanings, referring to both the traditional dream-devouring creature and to the Malayan tapir. In recent years, there have been changes in how the baku is depicted.

== History and description ==
The traditional Japanese nightmare-devouring baku originates in Chinese folklore from the mo 貘 and was familiar in Japan as early as the Muromachi period (14th–15th century). Hori Tadao has described the dream-eating abilities attributed to the traditional baku and relates them to other preventatives against nightmare such as amulets. Kaii-Yōkai Denshō Database, citing a 1957 paper, and Mizuki also describe the dream-devouring capacities of the traditional baku.

Before its adaptation to the Japanese dream-caretaker myth creature, an early 17th-century Japanese manuscript, the Sankai Ibutsu (山海異物), describes the baku as a shy, Chinese mythical chimera with the trunk and tusks of an elephant, the ears of a rhinoceros, the tail of a cow, the body of a bear and the paws of a tiger, which protected against pestilence and evil, although eating nightmares was not included among its abilities. However, in a 1791 Japanese wood-block illustration, a specifically dream-destroying baku is depicted with an elephant's head, tusks, and trunk, with horns and tiger's claws. The elephant's head, trunk, and tusks are characteristic of baku portrayed in classical era (pre-Meiji) Japanese wood-block prints (see illustration) and in shrine, temple, and netsuke carvings.

Writing in the Meiji period, Lafcadio Hearn (1902) described a baku with very similar attributes that was also able to devour nightmares. Legend has it that a person who wakes up from a bad dream can call out to baku. A child having a nightmare in Japan will wake up and repeat three times, "Baku-san, come eat my dream." Legends say that the baku will come into the child's room and devour the bad dream, allowing the child to go back to sleep peacefully. However, calling to the baku must be done sparingly, because if he remains hungry after eating one's nightmare, he may also devour their hopes and desires as well, leaving them to live an empty life. The baku can also be summoned for protection from bad dreams prior to falling asleep at night. In the 1910s, it was common for Japanese children to keep a baku talisman at their bedside.

== Gallery ==
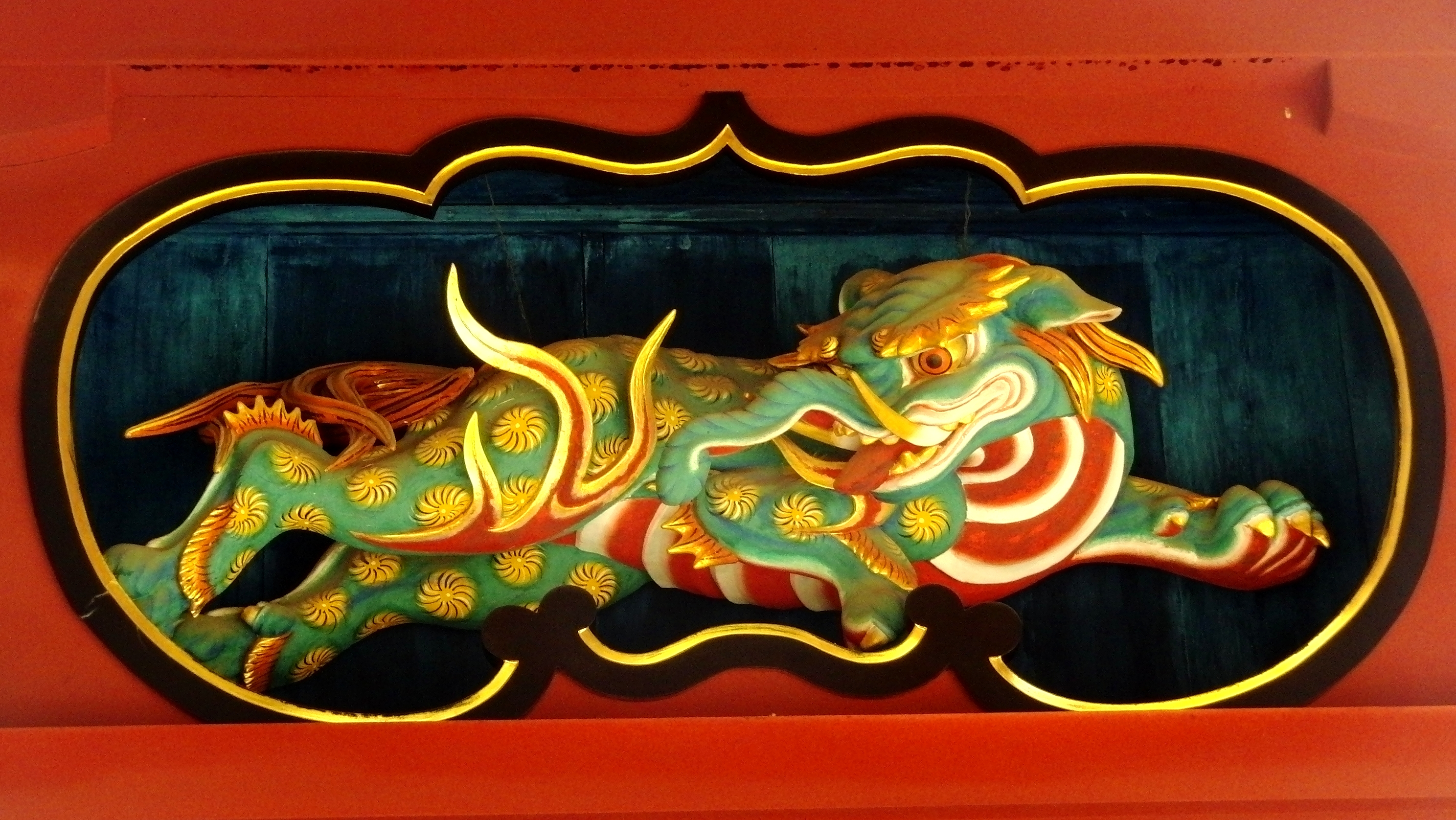
Baku sculpture at the Konnoh Hachimangu Shrine, Shibuya, Tokyo, Japan

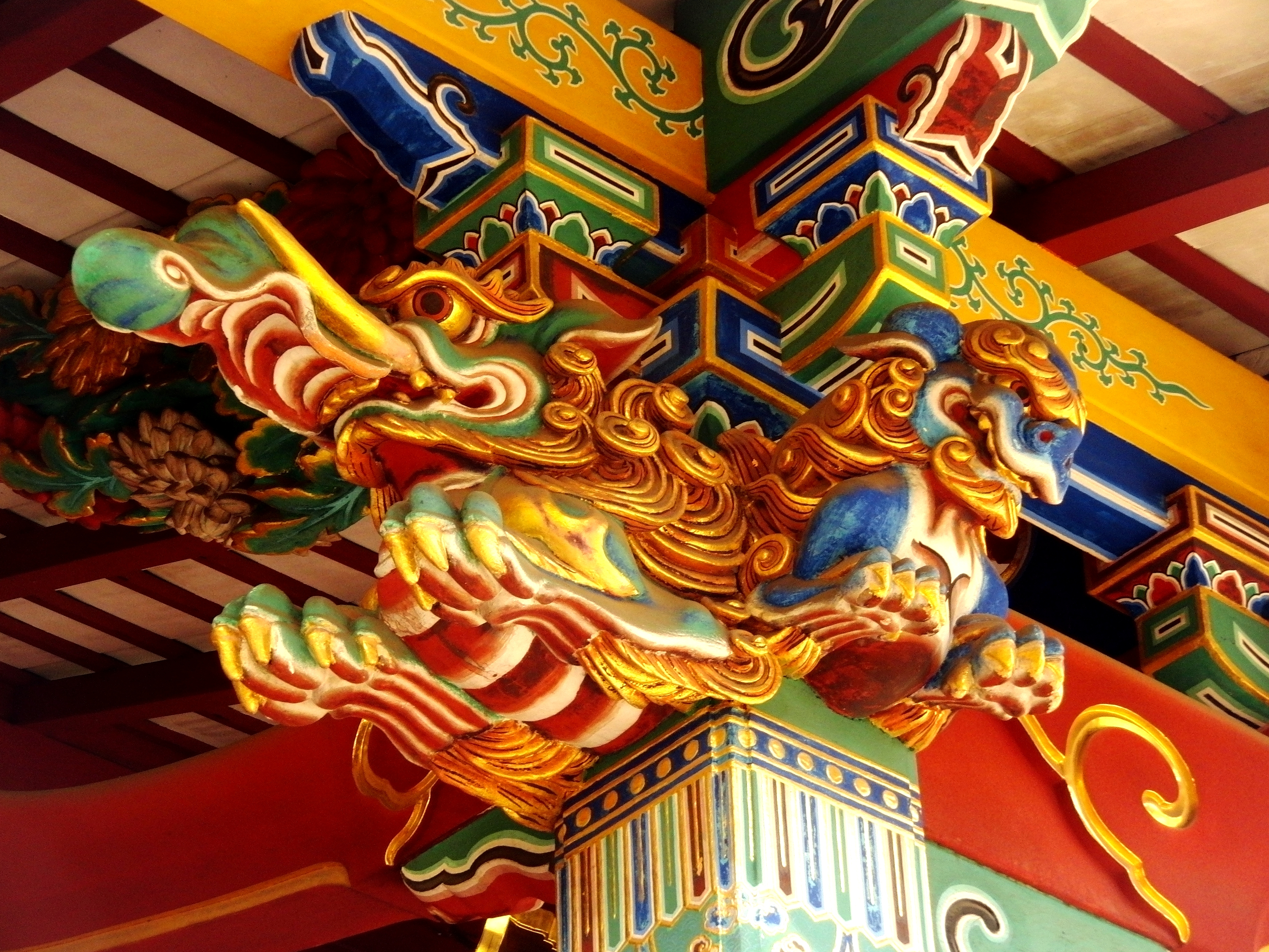
Baku and Lion sculpture at the Konnoh Hachimangu Shrine, Shibuya, Tokyo, Japan

== See also ==
- Dreamcatcher

== Bibliography ==
- Kaii-Yōkai Denshō Database. International Research Center for Japanese Studies. Retrieved on 2007-05-12. (Summary of excerpt from Warui Yume o Mita Toki (悪い夢をみたとき, When You've Had a Bad Dream?) by Keidō Matsushita, published in volume 5 of the journal Shōnai Minzoku (庄内民俗, Shōnai Folk Customs) on June 15, 1957).
