= Mo (Chinese zoology) =

Chinese name for giant panda and tapir

- Lithograph of the mo (貘) by Charles Philibert de Lasteyrie, 1824 Journal asiatique
- Chinese: 貘
Transcriptions
Standard Mandarin
- Hanyu Pinyin: mò
- Wade–Giles: mo
- IPA: /mu̯ɔ⁵¹/
Yue: Cantonese
- Yale Romanization: mahk, mohk
- Jyutping: mak^{6}, mok^{6}
Southern Min
- Hokkien POJ: bo̍k
- Tâi-lô: bo̍k
Middle Chinese
- Middle Chinese: mak
Old Chinese
- Baxter–Sagart (2014): mˁak

Mo (Chinese: 貘) was the Chinese name for the giant panda from the 3rd century BCE to the 19th century CE. In 1824, the French sinologist Jean-Pierre Abel-Rémusat misidentified the mò as the black-and-white Malayan tapir (Tapirus indicus). Chinese woodblocks depict the mò (貘) as having an elephant trunk, rhinoceros eyes, cow tail and tiger paws, following the description of 9th-century Tang poet Bai/Bo Juyi. Abel-Rémusat's interpretation was adopted in Western zoology, and later accepted as modern scientific fact in China and Japan. In the 20th century, since mò had lost its original meaning, the giant panda was given a new Chinese name da xiongmao (大熊貓; 'large bear cat').

== Zoology ==
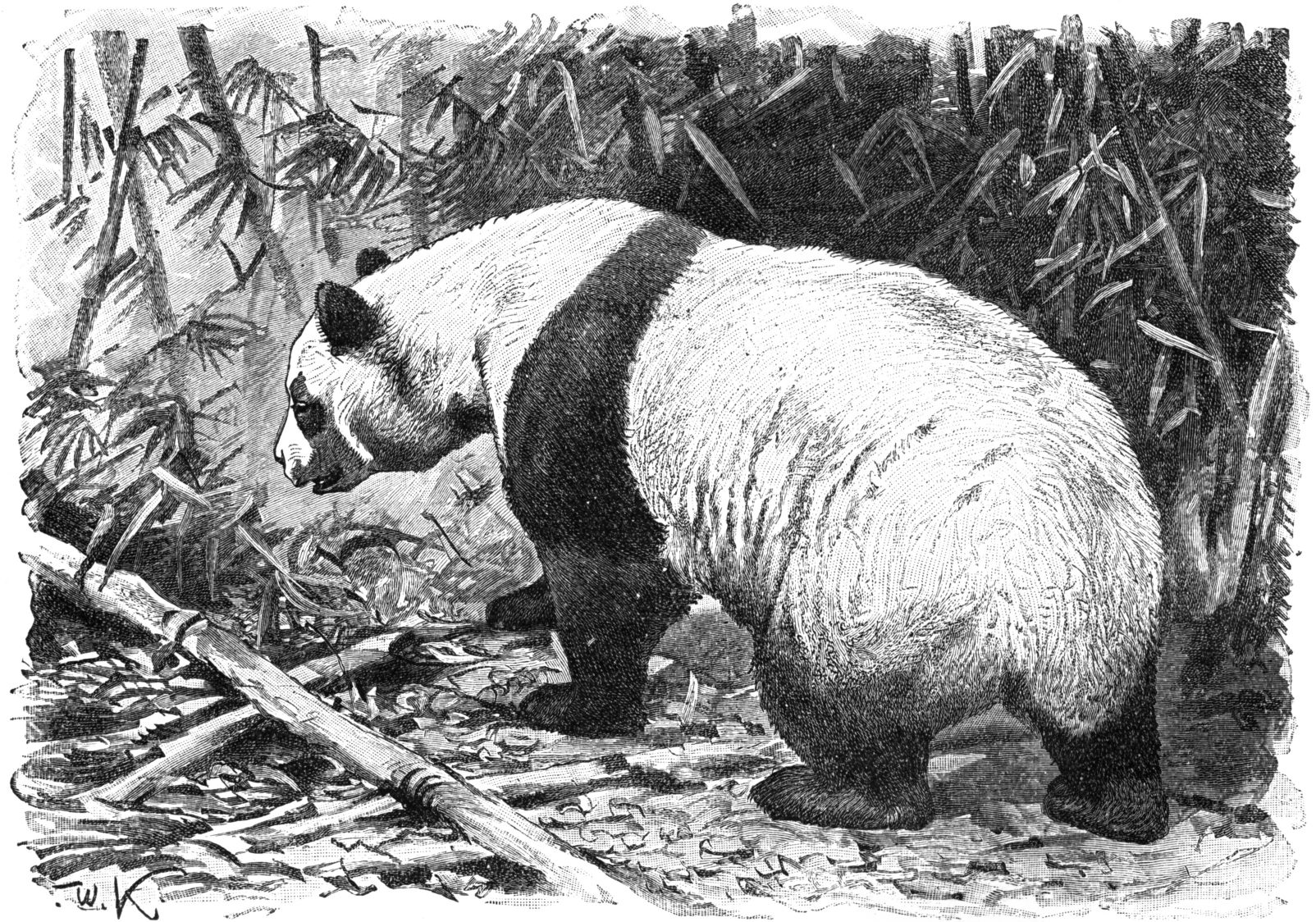
Giant panda illustration, Wilhelm Kuhnert 1927

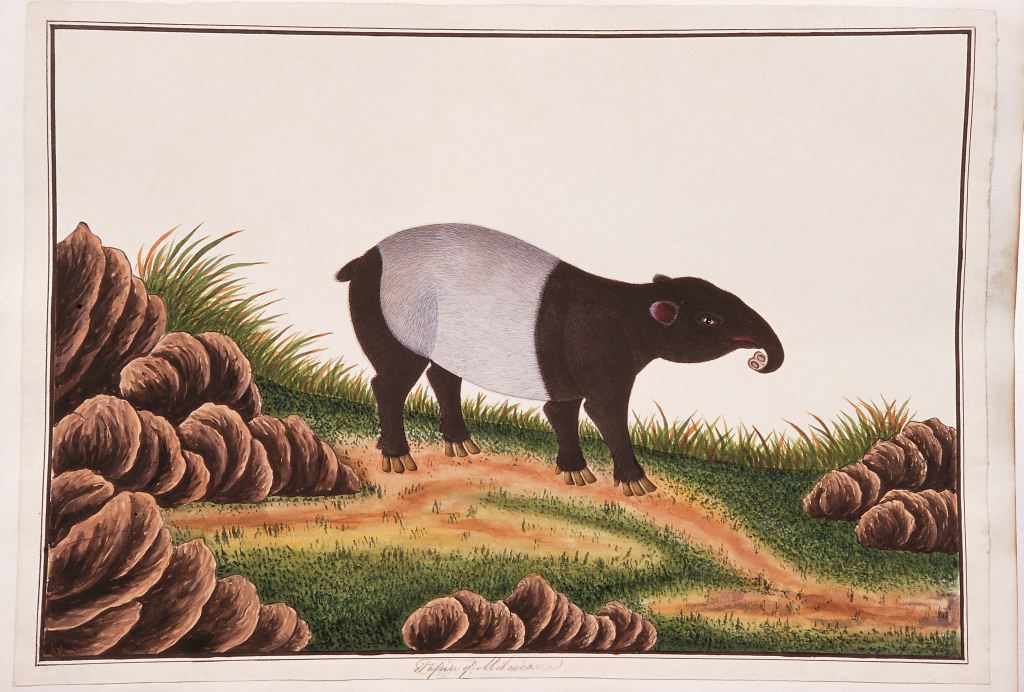
Watercolor of the Malayan tapir, 1819-1823 William Farquhar Collection of Natural History Drawings

The giant panda or panda bear (Ailuropoda melanoleuca) is a large, black and white bear native to mountainous forests in South Central China. Its habitat is mainly in Sichuan, but also in neighboring Shaanxi and Gansu. The panda's coat is mainly white with black fur on its ears, eye patches, muzzle, shoulders, and legs. Despite its taxonomic classification as a carnivoran, the giant panda's diet is primarily herbivorous, consisting almost exclusively of bamboo.

The Malayan tapir or Asian tapir (Tapirus indicus) is a black and white odd-toed ungulate, somewhat piglike in appearance, and with a long flexible proboscis. Its habitat includes southern Myanmar, southern Vietnam, southwestern Thailand, the Malay Peninsula, and Sumatra. The animal's coat has a light-colored patch that extends from its shoulders to its buttocks, and the rest of its hair is black, except for the white-rimmed tips of its ears. The Malayan tapir is exclusively herbivorous, and eats the shoots and leaves of many plant species.

Zooarchaeology reveals that fossil bones of Ailuropoda and Tapirus occurred in Pleistocene animal remains in Southern China region. The giant panda and tapir continued to occupy the lowlands and river valleys of Southern China until the Pleistocene and Holocene boundary, around 10,000 years before present. Tapir fossils have been found in an emperor's tomb Xi'an in southern China, dating from 2200 years ago.

Shang dynasty animal remains excavated at Anyang, Henan included Tapirus but not Ailuropoda. Two tapir mandibular fragments are the only instance of Pleistocene or Holocene tapirs found so far north. The paleontologists Teilhard de Chardin and Yang Zhongjian believed the tapir bones were evidence of a Shang import from the south, and they are the "last zoological evidence of human-tapir contact in China, occurring in a zoogeographic region never inhabited by the tapir".

The circa 13th to 11th centuries BCE Shang oracle bones, which constitute the earliest known corpus of ancient Chinese writing, include some Oracle bone script tentatively identified as mò < *mˁak (貘 or 獏 glyphs. According to Harper, these Shang oracle and Zhou bronze inscriptions were more likely a name for a clan or place than a wild animal.

Western zoologists first learned of both the Malayan tapir and giant panda in the 19th century. In January 1816, Major William Farquhar, the Resident of Malacca, sent the first account of the Malayan tapir to the Royal Asiatic Society of Great Britain and Ireland with drawings of the animal and its skeleton. However, he did not assign a binomial name for the "tapir of Malacca", and Anselme Gaëtan Desmarest coined Tapirus indicus in 1819. In December 1816, G. J. Siddons discovered a young tapir in British Bencoolen, Sumatra that he shipped to The Asiatic Society in Calcutta. The French naturalist Pierre-Médard Diard, who studied under Georges Cuvier, read Farquahr's account, examined Siddons's tapir in the Governor's menagerie at Barrackpore, and sent a description to Anselme Gaëtan Desmarest in Paris, who published an account of the tapir in 1819.

In 1869, the French Lazarist priest Armand David (1826–1900) acquired a specimen of a giant panda that hunters in Sichuan captured alive, which was killed and shipped to Paris for study. He coined the giant panda's original binomial name Ursus melanoleucus (from Latin and Ancient Greek "black and white bear") and the corresponding French name ours blanc et noir. The first Westerner known to have seen a living giant panda is the German zoologist Hugo Weigold, who purchased a cub in 1916. Kermit and Theodore Roosevelt Jr., became the first foreigners to shoot a panda, on a 1929 expedition funded by the Field Museum of Natural History. In 1936, Ruth Harkness became the first Westerner to bring back a live giant panda, which went to live at the Brookfield Zoo.

== Terminology ==
Late Shang dynasty bronze script for 貘, c. 11th century BCE

Qin dynasty seal script for 貘, 3rd century BCE

Chinese has numerous names for the "giant panda" ranging from Old Chinese *mˁak (貘 or 獏) to Modern Standard Chinese dàxióngmāo (大熊貓). Note that Old and Middle Chinese reconstructions are from William H. Baxter and Laurent Sagart (2014).

=== Mo ===
The standard "giant panda" name mò (貘) is written with several graphic variant characters.

Mò < Middle Chinese mak < Old Chinese *mˁak (貘 or 獏, giant panda) are phono-semantic compound characters that combine the phonetic component mò < mak < *mˁak (莫, "no; nothing; not") with the semantic indicators "predatory beast" 豸 or "dog" 犭.

Mò < mæk < *mˁak (貊 or 貉) was an "ancient ethnonym for non-Chinese people in northeast China" (cf. Korean Maek (貊) people), which was sometimes used as a homophonous phonetic loan character to write mò < mak < *mˁak (貘, "panda"). The graphs combine the "predatory beast" semantic indicator with bǎi < pæk < *pˁrak (百, "hundred") and gè < kak < *kˁak (各, "each") phonetic components—貉 is usually pronounced hé < xæk < *qʰˁrak meaning "racoon dog". Chinese characters for non-Chinese ("barbarian") peoples frequently used these "beast" and "dog" semantic indicators as ethnic slurs (see Graphic pejoratives in written Chinese).

These panda-name variants mo (貘; "southwestern animal") and mo (貊; "northeastern region") were easily distinguished from context. The notion of "whiteness" is a common factor among names for the black-and-white "giant panda". Mò < *mˁak (貊; "panda") has a variant mò or bò (貃), with a bái < bæk < *bˁrak (白; "white") phonetic component. The earliest dictionary definition of mo (貘; "panda") is báibào < *bˁrakpˁ‹r›u (白豹; "white leopard", see the Erya below). Chinese auspicious creatures were frequently white, such as the báihǔ (白虎; "White Tiger") and báizé (白澤) below.

Paleography confirms that early graphs for mò < *mˁak (貘 or 獏) occur in bronze script on Chinese bronze inscriptions from the Shang dynasty (c. 1600–1046 BCE) and Zhou dynasty (c. 1046–256 BCE), and in seal script standardized during the Qin dynasty (221–206 BCE). The ancient bronze and seal scripts combine an animal pictograph semantic indicator with a *mˁak phonetic component written with double 艸 or 艹 "grass" and 日 "sun" elements, but the bottom "grass" was changed to 大 "big" in the modern phonetic mò (莫).

The Old Chinese etymology of mò < *mˁak (貊, 貉, 漠, 膜) words connected with mù < *mək (牧; "pasture; herd; herding; animals"). In 5th and 4th century BCE southern Chu manuscripts excavated in Hubei, mò < *mˁak (莫) was used to write "animal pelt".

=== Other panda names ===
The giant panda has some additional Chinese names. Ancient myths that pandas can eat iron and copper led to the appellation shítiěshòu (食鐵獸; "iron-eating beast"). The Chinese variety spoken in the main panda habitat of Sichuan has names of huāxióng (花熊; "flowery bear") and báixióng (白熊; "white bear"), (reiterating "whiteness" mentioned above), which is now the usual Chinese name for the "polar bear".

The modern Standard Chinese name Chinese: 大熊貓; pinyin: dàxióngmāo; lit. 'big bear cat'; trans. "giant panda", which was coined from the taxonomic genus Ailuropoda from Neo-Latin ailuro- "cat". The related name xiǎoxióngmāo (小熊貓; "small bear cat") refers to the lesser or red panda (Ailurus fulgens) native to the eastern Himalayas and southwestern China.

=== Associated names ===
Woodblock illustration of the pi (貔), 1725 Complete Classics Collection of Ancient China

Besides the above panda-specific terms there are several related animal names.

In early Chinese zoological terminology, the mò < *mˁak (貘; "giant panda" was considered a kind of bào < *pˁ‹r›u (豹; "leopard"). The Erya below defines mò as báibào < *bˁrakpˁ‹r›u (白豹; "white leopard".

Pí < *bij (貔) or píxiū < *bijqʰu (貔貅) was a "mythical fierce grey and white tiger- or bear-like animal" that scholars have associated with the giant panda. The Erya defines pi as baihu < *bˁrakɡʷˁa (白狐; "white fox") and its young is called hù < *ɡˁaʔ (豰). Guo Pu's commentary gives an alternate name of zhiyi < *tipləj (執夷), and groups pi with tigers and leopards (虎豹之屬). The Shuowen jiezi entry links pi with the northeastern region Mo (貊 or 貉, also used for "panda"): "Belongs to the group leopard (豹屬), comes from the country Mo (貉). 'The Shijing says, "offer as a gift that pi pelt (獻其貔皮)", and the Zhoushu says, "like tiger like pi [如虎如貔]." Pi is a ferocious beast [猛獸]." Three Shuowen jiezi entries after this one, the mo (貘; "panda") is said to have come from Shu in the southwest. Thus, in pre-Han and Han texts the words mò and pi "did not denote the same animal and pi cannot be the giant panda".

Xuánmò < *ɢʷˁinmˁak (玄獏; "dark mo") was a regional product that the northeastern Yi people of Lingzhi (present day Hebei) submitted to the Zhou court, according to the pre-Han Yi Zhou shu. The 3rd century commentator Kong Chao (孔晁) referred to the Erya definition of mo as baibao ("white leopard") or baihu (白狐; "white fox") in a variant text reading, and defined xuanmo as heibao (黑豹; "black leopard") or heihu (黑狐; "black fox"). However, since xuanmo came from northeast of China it is unlikely that the referent was the giant panda from the southwest.

Chéng < *C.lreŋ (程; "amount; rule; journey") is an obscure animal name that could be related to the mo. The Zhuangzi and Liezi have the phrase "qingning generates chéng, chéng generates horse, horse generates humankind" (青寧生程 程生馬 馬生人) in a passage on cyclical processes. A medieval quotation from the lost book Shizi said cheng (程) was equivalent with the standard Chinese name bao (豹; "leopard") and the Yue (southeast coastal region) regional name mo (貘). The commentator Shen Gua (1031–1095) said the ancient meaning might be the same as the contemporary usage in Yanzhou (in present-day Shaanxi), where cheng was the local word for chong (蟲; "tiger; leopard"). Harper concludes that even if we assume the Shizi quotation is authentic, the information that cheng, bao, and mò were ancient synonyms in regional languages is not evidence that any of them referred to the giant panda.

Jiǎotù < *k-rˁiwʔ l̥ˁa-s (狡兔; "cunning hare") is an iron-eating animal related to the mò. It is recorded in the Shiyi ji (拾遺記; "Record of Gleanings"), compiled by the Daoist Wang Jia (d. 390 CE) from apocryphal histories. "The cunning hare found on Kunwu Mountain is shaped like rabbit, the male is yellow and the female white, and it eats cinnabar, copper, and iron. Anciently, when all the weapons in the King of Wu's armory went missing, they dug into the ground and discovered two hares, one white and one yellow, and their stomachs were full of iron, which when cast into weapons would cut jade like mud. The cunning hare is in the mò panda category." (昆吾山狡兔形如兔雄黃雌白食丹石銅鐵 昔吳王武庫兵器悉盡掘地得二兔一白一黃腹內皆鐵取鑄爲劒切玉如泥皆貘類也).

== Mo giant panda ==
Chinese texts have described the mò "giant panda" for over two millennia.

=== Erya ===
The circa 4th or 3rd century BCE Erya lexicon section shòu (獸; "beasts") defines mo (貘; "giant panda") as a baibao (白豹; "white leopard"). The snow leopard (Panthera uncia) is an alternate identification of this "white leopard". The Erya commentary by Guo Pu (276–324) says the mò,

"Resembles a bear, with a small head, short legs, mixed black and white; able to lick and consume iron, copper, and bamboo joints; its bones are strong and solid within, having little marrow; and its pelt can repel dampness. Some say that a white-colored leopard has the separate name mò." (似熊頭庳腳黑白駁能舐食銅鐵及竹骨骨節強直中實少髓皮辟濕或曰豹白色者別名貘)

The next two Erya definitions of animal names are parallel with mo: hán < *ɡˁam (甝) is a báihǔ < *bˁrakqʰˁraʔ (白虎; "white tiger"); shù < *Cə.liwk (虪) is a hēihǔ < *m̥ˁəkqʰˁraʔ (黑虎; "black tiger"). Guo's commentary says the names referred to white-colored and black-colored tigers, not zoologically different animals. Unlike the mò giant panda's familiar cultural identity and history, neither han nor shu occurs in any early texts besides the Erya.

=== Shanhai jing ===
The c. 3rd or 2nd century BCE Shanhai Jing (Classic of Mountains and Seas) mytho-geography does not directly mention mo (貘), but says one mountain has panda-like měngbào (猛豹; "ferocious leopards"), and Guo Pu's 4th century CE commentary to another mountain says it was the habitat of mo (㹮) pandas.

The description of Nanshan (南山; "South Mountain") says, "On its summit are quantities of granular cinnabar [丹粟]. The River Cinnabar rises here and flows north to empty into the River Rapids. Among the animals on this mountain are numerous wild leopards [猛豹]. Its birds are mostly cuckoos [尸鳩]." Guo Pu says, "The ferocious leopard resembles the bear but is smaller. Its fur is thin and brightly glossy; it can eat snakes and eat copper and iron; it comes from Shu. Alternatively, the graph bao (豹) is written hu (虎) [tiger]." (猛豹似熊而小毛淺有光澤能食蛇食銅鐵出蜀中豹或作虎). The sub-commentary of Hao Yixing (郝懿行) identifies mengbao < *mˁrəŋʔpˁ‹r›u (猛豹; "ferocious leopard") or menghu < *mˁrəŋʔqʰˁraʔ (猛虎; "ferocious tiger") as the similarly pronounced mobao < *mˁakpˁ‹r›u (貘豹; "panda leopard").

The Shanhai jing description of Laishan (崍山; "Lai Mountain") says, "On the mountain's south face are quantities of yellow gold, and on its north face are numerous elk and great deer [麋麈]. Its trees are mostly sandalwood and dye mulberry [檀柘]. Its plants are mostly shallot and garlic [薤韭], and many iris [葯]. There are sloughed-off snakeskins [空奪] on this mountain.". Guo identifies Lai Mountain with Qionglai Mountain (in ancient Shu, present day Sichuan), notes it was the habitat of the mò (㹮), and says, "Mò resembles a bear or a black and white bo, and also eats copper and iron" [㹮似熊而黒白駮亦食銅鐵也]. Bo (駁; "contradict") names "a mythical beast like a saw-toothed piebald horse that eats tigers and leopards".

Despite the similarities between how Guo Pu's Erya commentary above describes the mo (貘; "panda"), and his descriptions of the mo (㹮; "panda") on Lai Mountain and mengbao (猛豹; "ferocious leopard") on South Mountain; he plainly does not identify the thin-furred mengbao or menghu as the black and white panda, but rather as another metal-eating animal from Shu that resembled the bear.

=== Shuowen jiezi ===
Xu Shen's c. 121 Shuowen jiezi Chinese character dictionary definition of mo (貘) says, "resembles the bear, yellow and black in color, comes from Shu" (the region of present-day Sichuan). Duan Yucai's 1815 commentary to the Shuowen jiezi identifies mò as the "iron-eating beast" (鐵之獸) or Shanhai jing's "ferocious leopard" (猛豹). He says "the animals still inhabited the eastern part of Sichuan, and were a nuisance to locals who gathered firewood in the mountains and who needed to take iron to feed the metal-hungry pandas. Dishonest people sell panda teeth as fake Buddhist Śarīra relics.". The cultural motif of metal-eating animals was neither unique to the panda nor to China, and by the 3rd or 4th century this folklore occurred from the Mediterranean to China and often in connection with the forge and metalworking.

The evidence of the Erya and Shuowen jiezi indicates that pre-Han and Han readers knew the giant panda by the name mò, which they understood to be both bear-like and belong to the leopard category.

=== Early poetry ===
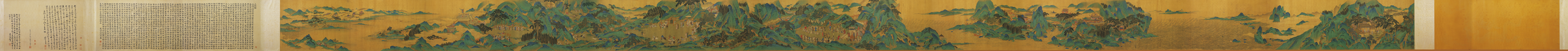
Shanglin Park, Scrollable handscroll illustrating Sima Xiangru's famous Rhapsody on Shanglin Park attributed to Qiu Ying (c. 1494-1552)

Beginning with the Han dynasty, the giant panda was a popular trope in Classical Chinese poetry. Mò first appeared in Sima Xiangru's c. 138 BCE Shanglin fu (上林賦; "Rhapsody on Shanglin Park"). Emperor Wu of Han's Shanglin (Supreme Grove) hunting park west of the capital Chang'an that contained wildlife from all of China, organized by habitat. The twelve Beasts of the South, where "In deepest winter there are germination and growth, bubbling waters, and surging waves," included the mò giant panda, zebu, yak, sambar, elephant, and rhinoceros. Archeological excavations confirmed the giant panda as object of spectacle in the same century. The tomb menagerie of Empress Dowager Bo (d. 155 BCE) included a giant panda, rhinoceros, horse, sheep, and dog; implying that in addition to animal performances and hunting, "we may imagine the elite observing the giant panda and other wildlife at close range in enclosures".

The giant panda next appeared in Yang Xiong's (53 BCE-18 CE) rhapsody on the Shu capital (present day Chengu) that lists mò among the wildlife of Min Mountain north of the city. Both Sima Xiangru and Yang Xiong were natives of Shu, and likely knew the giant panda from personal experience.

Zuo Si (c. 250-c. 305) mentioned the mò in hunting passages from his rhapsodies on the southern capitals of Shu and Wu. In the Wu capital (Wuxi in Jiangsu) the hunters "trampled jackals and tapirs" or "kicked dhole and giant panda, and in the Shu capital hunt "They impale the iron-eating beast" (戟食鐵之獸) and "Shoot the poison-swallowing deer" (射噬毒之鹿豺). The commentary by Liu Kui says mò pandas were found in Jianning (建寧), present-day Chengjiang County, Yunnan, and glosses "iron-eating beast" by repeating the common belief that the giant panda could rapidly consume large amounts of iron simply by licking with its tongue.

=== Shenyi jing ===
An animal named nietie (齧鐵; "iron-chewer") is mentioned in the Shenyi jing (神異經; "Classic on Divine Marvels"), a collection of regional information on marvelous creatures, which is traditionally attributed to Dongfang Shuo (c. 160 BCE – c. 93 BCE) but more likely dates from the 2nd century CE. "In the south quarter there is a beast with horns and hoofs whose size is like the water buffalo. Its coat is black like lacquer. It eats iron and drinks water. Its feces can be used to make weapons whose sharpness is like steel. Its name is "iron-chewer." (南方有獸毛黑如漆食鐵飮水名齧鐵). A 10th century quotation not found in the transmitted Baopuzi text referred to the Shenyi jing "iron-chewer", "Master Dongfang recognized the iron-swallowing beast" (東方生識啖鐵之獸).

Although the origins of the Chinese metal eating motif are uncertain, it remained an identifying characteristic of mò through the 19th century when Duan Yucai noted it. Harper proposes that the nietie "iron-chewer" embodied this motif, and although the mo panda was already associated with whiteness and metal, the marvelous "iron-chewer" added to its cultural identity.

=== Bencao gangmu ===
Li Shizhen's 1596 Bencao Gangmu (Compendium of Materia Medica) section on animal drugs enters mo (貘) between leopard and elephant entries.

The skins are used as rugs and mattresses. It is a good absorbent of body vapours. It is like a bear, head small, feet short, with a black and white striped skin. The hair is short and glossy. It enjoys eating copper and iron things, bamboo, bones, and venomous snakes. Local people lose their axes and cooking utensils. The urine can dissolve iron. Its joints are very straight and strong, the bones are solid without marrow. In the Tang dynasty it was a favorite motif for screens. It occurs in Omei Mts., Szechuan, and Yunnan. It has a nose like an elephant, eyes like a rhinoceros, tail like a cow, and feet like a tiger. The teeth and bones are so hard that the blades of axes are broken by them. Firing does not effect the bones. It is said that antelope horn can break a diamond, so can the bones of a tapir.

Li Shizhen lists three associated animals: Nietie (齧鐵), "A southern species. The size of water buffalo, black and shiny. The feces are as hard as iron. One animal was recorded 7 feet high which could travel 300 li a day." An (豻), "A monstrous terrific beast producing one horn. [Giles dictionary], the tapir. Some accounts ally it with the Mongolian mastiff [胡狗; Hugou]. It is like a black fox, 7 feet long, in its old age it has scales. It can eat tigers, leopards, crocodiles, and metals. Hunters are afraid of it." Jiaotu (狡兔), "In the K'un-Wu mountains there is a rabbit-like animal which is iron eating. The male is yellow and the female white." Li also gives three medicinal uses for the mò: Pi (皮; "skin"), "Slept on it will remove heat boils, and it keeps off damp and bad infections." Gao (膏; "fat"), "For carbuncles. It is well absorbed." Shi (屎; "feces"), "Taken to dissolve copper or iron objects which have been accidentally swallowed.".

== Mo mythical chimera ==
Woodblock illustration of the mo (貘), 1609 Sancai Tuhui

Woodblock illustration of the mo (貘), 1712 Wakan Sansai Zue

Woodblock illustration of the mo (貘), 1725 Complete Classics Collection of Ancient China

Woodblock illustration of the mo (貘), 1801 Erya Yintu (爾雅音圖)

From the Han through the Tang dynasty (618–907), the giant panda name mò consistently referred to an exotic black and white bear-like animal found in southern China, with a pelt that repelled dampness, and legends about its solid bones, hard teeth, and metal eating. Giant panda pelts were luxury items and Emperor Taizong of Tang (r. 626–649) presented mò pelts as banquet gifts to a select group of officials.

Then in the 9th century, the renowned Tang poet and government official Bai/Bo Juyi (772–846) popularized the name mò denoting a fantastic mythological chimera with elephant trunk–rhinoceros eyes–cow tail–tiger paws components, drawings of which were supposedly able to repel contagion and evil. Chinese mythology has a long chimeral tradition of composite or hybrid beasts with parts from different animals. Some examples are the denglong, kui, fenghuang, and qilin. In comparative mythology, many cultures have four-animal part hybrids combining four kinds of animal parts, comparable to the Chinese "quadripartite mò".

Bai Juyi wrote about suffering from headaches—tóufēng (頭風; 'head wind') that according to traditional medical theory were caused by the feng (風; 'wind') "wind-ailments" (cf. Western miasma theory)—and he used a folding screen known as a píngfēng (屏風; "wind screen/wall") to prevent drafts. The poet commissioned an artist to paint a fabulous mò on his wind screen, which Bai enjoyed so much that he composed his famed Moping zan (貘屏贊; "Mo folding-screen paean") in 823. The preface explains:

The mò has elephant trunk, rhinoceros eyes, cow tail, and tiger paws [貘者象鼻犀目牛尾虎足]. It inhabits the mountains and valleys of the south. To sleep on its pelt repels contagion [寢其皮辟瘟]. To draw its form repels evil [圖其形辟邪]. In the past I suffered from wind-ailment of the head [病頭風], and whenever I slept I always protected my head with a small screen. By chance I met a painter and had him draw (the mò). I note that in the Shanhai jing this beast eats iron and copper, and eats nothing else. This stirred me and now I have composed a paean for it.

Bai used two Chinese medicinal terms for what a mò image specifically repelled: wēn (瘟; "epidemic; infection") and xié (邪,; "evil; unhealthy influences that cause disease"). Earlier Chinese sources about mò did not mention drawing one in order to repel evil through apotropaic magic, and artists were free to shape the hybrid beast without reference to the giant panda. The Japanese baku (獏) changed the Chinese myth about the mò image preventing illness to dream-devouring in order to prevent nightmares.

Bai's "eats iron and copper, and eats nothing else" reference comes from Guo Pu's 4th century commentary to the Shanhai jing and not the pre-Han classic text. The Shanhai jing proper mentions the mengbao "ferocious leopard" on South Mountain, which Guo notes as a metal-eating beast similar to the mò, and mentions Lai Mountain, which he glosses as a mò habitat. Bai Juyi's reading of the Shanhai jing with Guo's commentary, conflated the "ferocious leopard" and mò "panda" as same metal-eating animal.

Duan Chengshi's 863 Youyang zazu (Assorted Morsels from Youyang) is a miscellany of legends and stories, including the giant panda under the name moze (貘澤; 'panda marsh'). "The moze (貘澤) is as large as the dog. Its fat has the quality of dispersing and smoothing. When placed in the hands or when stored in copper, iron, or pottery vessels it entirely permeates them. When contained in bone it does not leak." This Youyang zazu context is the only extant early record of the word moze < Middle Chinese mækdræk, which Harper explains as a Tang pun with the marvelous baize < bækdræk (白澤; "White Marsh") creature. Its omniscience of the world's supernatural creatures was supposedly written down as the lost Baize tu (白澤圖; "White Marsh diagrams"), which were popular iconographic drawings used to protect the home from harm. Harper suggests an origin for the mò's elephant trunk. In the 8th and 9th centuries the Indian elephant-headed deity Ganesha was the Buddhist counterpart to the popular Chinese spirit-protector Baize.

In the centuries after the Tang, Chinese people's ideas and impressions of the mò were mostly obtained from old textual accounts and illustrations in woodblock printed books, not from nature. The woodblock illustrations are variations on Bo Juyi' s elephant trunk–rhinoceros eyes–cow tail–tiger paws components mò, regularly with the elephant trunk but not consistently. Details were sometimes selectively combined, as when bear-like features were mixed with elephant trunk. For instance, the Piya dictionary, compiled by Lu Dian (陸佃) (1042–1102), described the mò as: "resembling the bear with elephant trunk, rhinoceros eyes, lion head, dhole fur. Its feces can be made into armaments that will cut jade, its urine can dissolve iron into water." (貘似熊獅首豺髲鋭鬐卑脚糞可爲兵切玉尿能消鐵爲水).

The oldest mò illustration dates from the Song dynasty (960–1279) or Yuan dynasty (1271–1368). It is found in the Erya yintu, the extant 1801 facsimile woodblock edition of the Yuan facsimile manuscript copy of an illustrated Song edition of the Erya. The head with ears and trunk appears more like an elephant than the later Chinese and Japanese illustrations in which Abel-Rémusat recognized the tapir. The main difference is the coat, which is depicted with white midsection, and is the one detail that connected the quadripartite mò to the giant panda in nature, whose coat has black shoulders and legs with white in the middle. The Erya yintu illustration is the only early example of this black and white mò depiction.

== Mo Malayan tapir ==
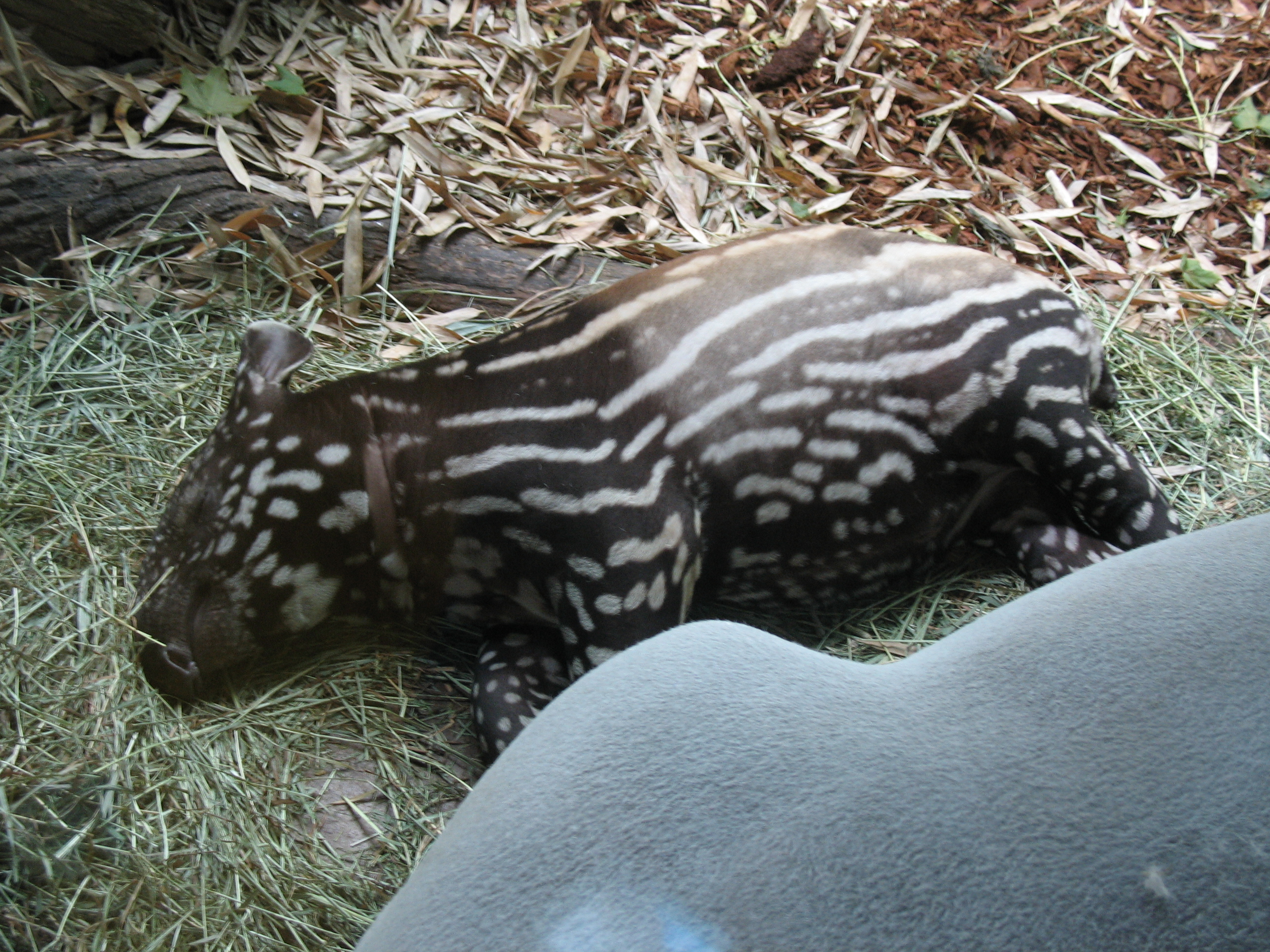
Juvenile Malayan tapir with dappled markings

Up until the late Qing dynasty (1644–1912), the Chinese name mo (貘) continued referring to both "giant panda" and "chimera with an elephant trunk, rhinoceros eyes, cow tail, and tiger paws", and owing to Jean-Pierre Abel-Rémusat's mix-up in the 1820s, mò was misidentified as the recently discovered "Malayan tapir".

In 1416, Ma Huan (c. 1380–1460), who accompanied Admiral Zheng He on three of his seven expeditions to the Western Oceans, recorded the first Chinese sighting of a tapir in Palembang, South Sumatra. Ma's Yingya Shenglan (The Overall Survey of the Ocean's Shores) says,

Also, the mountains produce a kind of spirit beast whose name is shenlu (神鹿; "spirit deer"). It resembles a large pig and is about three feet high. The front half is entirely black and one part of the rear is white; the hair is fine and uniformly short; and its appearance is attractive. The snout resembles the pig snout without the flatness. The four hoofs also resemble pig hoofs but with three toes. It only eats plants or woody stuff; it does not eat strong-tasting food or flesh.

Some early scholars, who were unaware of the Middle Chinese zyinluwk, say the inhabitants of Sumatra never called the tapir "divine stag" and propose that shenlu (神鹿) transcribed the Malay name tenuk, suggesting the Hainanese "Hylam dialect" that pronounces these characters as tinsin.

The c. 437 Book of the Later Han mentioned a different southern shenlu (神鹿) : "In Yunnan, there is a two-headed spirit deer that can eat poisonous plants." (雲南縣有神鹿兩頭能食毒草). The 4th century Huayangguo zhi noted the shenlu was found on Xiongcang Mountain (雄倉山).

While studying medicine at the Collège de France, Jean-Pierre Abel-Rémusat (1788–1832) became fascinated with a Chinese pharmacopoeia and taught himself to read Chinese by studying the 1671 Zhengzitong (Correct Character Mastery) dictionary for five years. Its mo (貘) entry says, "The teeth are so hard that they will smash an iron hammer to pieces. Fire will not affect the teeth, which can only be smashed with an antelope's horn." (齒最堅以鐵鎚之鐵皆碎落 火不能燒惟羚羊角能碎之). He became inaugural holder of the chair in Chinese and "Tartar-Manchu" languages at the Collège de France in 1814.

The preeminent zoologist Georges Cuvier, Abel-Rémusat's Collège de France colleague, informed him that in 1816 a new tapir species had been found in the Malay Peninsula and Sumatra, the first discovery in Asia of an animal that Europeans had encountered in the New World since the 16th century. When Cuvier published a revised "osteology of tapirs" (1822), he included the Malayan tapir (Tapirus indicus) and acknowledged Abel-Rémusat for showing him mò illustrations in Chinese and Japanese books that seemed to depict a tapir. In addition to the elephantine snout, both scholars thought that the markings shown on the mò's coat suggested the characteristic striped and spotted coat of the young Malayan tapir.

In 1824, Jean-Pierre Abel-Rémusat's brief article "Sur le tapir de la Chine", with a mo (貘) lithograph by Charles Philibert de Lasteyrie (1759–1849) based on Chinese and Japanese woodblock illustrations, was published in the Journal asiatique. This seminal article "combined textual sources without distinguishing time period" and confused the ancient Chinese mò panda and medieval mò chimera with an "Oriental tapir" (T. sinensus). The article first cites the 1716 Kangxi Zidian dictionary that quoted mò passages from the Erya, Shuowen jiezi, and 1627 Zhengzi tong dictionaries, along with the Shenyi jing and Shiyi ji. In Abel-Rémusat's view the Kangxi zidian entry contained fantastic, unreliable details. While the Shiyi ji noted the polymath Su Song (1020–1101) described the Tang custom of painting the mò on screens and cited Bai Juyi's phrase "drawing its form repels evil" as corroboration, the Kangxi zidian definition did not include Bai's original description of mò's quadripartite form. Abel-Rémusat evaluated Li Shizhen's 1596 Bencao gangmu entry on mò as the most reliable source, which cited Su Song on its "elephant trunk, rhinoceros eyes, cow tail, and tiger paws." Between illustrations and text, Abel-Rémusat concluded that despite some implausible details, the Chinese mò was obviously the tapir. Looking beyond the single instance of the mò he argued: "Chinese books are filled with observations on natural history of great interest and in general fairly accurate. It suffices to know how to distinguish them from the fables which are mixed together with them, and this is usually not so difficult.". Abel-Rémusat concluded that mò was the name of the "Chinese tapir" which he presumed, based on the Bencao gangmu locating the mò panda's habitat in Sichuan and Yunnan, and still "inhabited the western provinces of China and must be fairly common there."

The agronomist and printer Charles Philibert de Lasteyrie's lithograph of the mò reflected Chinese and Japanese woodblock illustrations from leishu ("category book") encyclopedias, which traditionally copied pictures from earlier reference works. The mò illustration in Wang Qi's (王圻) 1609 Sancai Tuhui (Collected Illustrations of the Three Realms [heaven, earth, and humans]) is typical, and the source for de Lasteyrie's 1824 lithograph. It was accurately copied into many later publications, for instance the 1712 Japanese Wakan Sansai Zue and 1725 Chinese Complete Classics Collection of Ancient China. In each illustration, the raised left front paw is definitive evidence of copying. The original Sancai Tuhui version depicted the mò with a flecked leopard coat; the mò entry is preceded by the chibao (赤豹; "red leopard") and followed by the pi (貔; "a ferocious animal" above"). Both illustration were drawn with spotted coats. Abel-Rémusat and de Lasteyrie were predisposed to see the image of a tapir and perceived the mò's coat as the distinctive spots and stripes of a juvenile tapir's coat. De Lasteyrie's coat lozenge design differed from the original Chinese illustrations and reinforced Abel-Rémusat's "Chinese tapir" notion.

Abel-Rémusat's 1824 "tapir" identification of mò was quickly adopted into 19th century reference works, as illustrated by the mò entries in the first three major Chinese-English dictionaries.

- "An animal said to resemble a wild boar; to have the trunk of an elephant, the eye of a rhinoceros, the tail of a cow, and the foot of a tiger."
- "A white leopard, like a bear, with a small head, and hard feet; the body is half white and half black; it is said to be able to wear away iron and copper, and the joints of bamboos by licking them; its bones are strong and solid within, having little marrow, but its skin cannot endure dampness. Another account says, that it is of a yellow colour, that its teeth are very hard so as to break iron hammers; if thrown into the fire they will not burn, and there is nothing but the horn of an antelope that can affect them. Others say, that it is of a black colour, and that it devours the hardest metals: it is said that the weapons in a military arsenal being once found missing, they dug into the ground and discovered two of these animals, with a quantity of iron in their stomachs, which being formed into weapons would cut gems like mud. Notwithstanding all these fabulous descriptions, it appears that the animal intended is the tapir."
- "The Malacca tapir (Tapirus malayanus), which the Chinese say was found in Sz'ch'uen, and is still found in Yunnan; they describe it as like a bear, with a black and white body, able to eat iron and copper, and having teeth that fire cannot burn; it has the nose of an elephant, eye of a rhinoceros, head of a lion, hair of a wolf, and feet of a tiger; a distorted figure of it was anciently drawn on screens as a charm."

Five years before the "tapir" misidentification, Robert Morrison's 1819 A Dictionary of the Chinese Language relied on Chinese-Chinese dictionaries and described the mò chimera. Nineteen years after it, Walter Henry Medhurst's 1843 Chinese and English Dictionary summarized the Kangxi zidian dictionary entry for mò and added that it was the tapir. Sixty-five years after Abel-Rémusat's identification and twenty before the panda became known in the West, Samuel Wells Williams's 1889 A Syllabic Dictionary of the Chinese Language specified, using early terminology, mò as the Malayan tapir (T. indicus), which was not found in China, claims that it—rather than the mò giant panda—was found in Sichuan and Yunnan, conflates early panda myths with Bo Juyi's mò chimera, and notes it was drawn on screens.

Western zoological literature about the tapir reached Meiji period Japan before Qing dynasty China. In 1885 Iwakawa Tomotarō (岩川友太郎) and Sasaki Chūjirō (佐々木忠次郎) published Dōbutsu tsūkai (動物通解, General Zoology), which was based mainly on their teacher Henry Alleyne Nicholson's 1873 A Manual of Zoology ..., and gave the Japanese name for the tapir as baku (貘). In China the 1915 first edition Ciyuan modern encyclopedic dictionary gave two definitions for mo. The first quoted the Erya with Guo Pu's commentary and concluded with Hao Yixing's (1757–1825) opinion that mò meant mobao (貘豹; "panda leopard"). The second definition was modern Japanese usage: "in Japan tapir is translated baku" (tapir 日本譯為貘). Du Yaquan (杜亞泉), editor-in-chief of the first modern Chinese publishing house Commercial Press, published Dongwuxue da cidian (動物學大辭典; "Encyclopedic Dictionary of Zoology") in 1922, which reconfirmed mò as the standard zoological nomenclature for the tapir. Neither Dōbutsu tsūkai nor Dongwuxue da cidian included the giant panda.

The first giant panda account in a Japanese or Chinese zoological work was Eri Megumi's (恵利恵) 1925–1927 Dōbutsugaku seigi (動物学精義, Zoology in Detail), which used Japanese irowakeguma (いろわけぐま) to translate "Parti-Coloured Bear", which along with "Giant Panda" was one of the two English names given in the naturalist Ernest Henry Wilson's 1913 account of animals in western China. The most remarkable detail in Dōbutsugaku seigi was Eri's unexplained statement that in China this animal must have once had the name mò (貘). The Chinese translation of Dōbutsugaku seigi included both names in English transcription along with two Chinese names mentioned by Wilson: pi (羆) and baixiong (白熊; "white bear"), and validated that Eri's mò statement was on record in Japan and China.

The Chinese name xiongmao (熊貓; "bear cat"), which originally referred to the cat-sized lesser panda, appears in two respected 1930s Chinese-Chinese dictionaries defining the giant panda. The 1936 first edition Cihai definition summarized the giant panda's modern history, mostly cited the activity of foreigners, and made two mistakes: "Xiongmao: Name of an unusual creature. It inhabits Xinjiang. Its body is very large. It is one of the rarest of unusual creatures surviving today. It was discovered sixty years ago by the French scientist Father David. In 1929 certain younger brothers of General Roosevelt of America captured it for the first time for exhibition at the Field Museum in Chicago. This animal's proper classification is not yet determined." Later editions of the Cihai did not correct the xiongmao entry's errors about Xinjiang rather than Sichuan and about Theodore Roosevelt's brothers rather than sons. The 1937 Guoyu cidian (國語辭典; "Dictionary of the National Language") definition of xiongmao repeated the Cihai error about a Xinjiang habitat, but it was corrected in the 1947 revised edition to read, "it inhabits the western part of Sichuan." In addition, the revised edition distinguished the two kinds of panda: da xiongmao ("large bear cat", giant panda) and xiao xiongmao ("small bear cat", lesser panda).

Until the 1970s, reference works uniformly defined Chinese mò as the scientific name for "tapir". For instance, the family Tapiridae is moke (貘科) and the genus Tapirus is moshu (貘属). "One man's speculation led to an event of modern cultural amnesia and the giant panda was erased from the record of pre-modem Chinese civilization.". In modern China, the zoologist Gao Yaoting (高耀亭) wrote the earliest article to confirm that mò was historically the giant panda's name. Gao distinguished between the ancient sources saying the animal named mò was bear-like and which materia medica identified as the giant panda and the medieval literary invention of a fantastic elephant-rhinoceros-cow-tiger chimera that Bo Juyi introduced. Being unfamiliar with Abel-Rémusat's 1824 article, Gao conjectured that mid-19th century Western zoological literature knew the giant panda by the local Sichuan names huaxiong (花熊; "flowery bear") and baixiong (白熊; "white bear"). In the west, Donald Harper, a sinologist specializing in early Chinese manuscripts, wrote a cultural history of the mò giant panda. It meticulously traces the strange history of the name mò from pre-Han texts referring to the giant panda, to the Tang belief that images of the fantastic elephant-trunked mò chimera would prevent illness, to the 1820s misidentification of mò as an assumed "Chinese tapir", which became commonly accepted as scientific fact. Besides restoring the giant panda's name and representation in early China, Harper also provides "a lesson in scholarly practice for all of us who use texts and allied materials to speculate about China's past and try to present the facts".

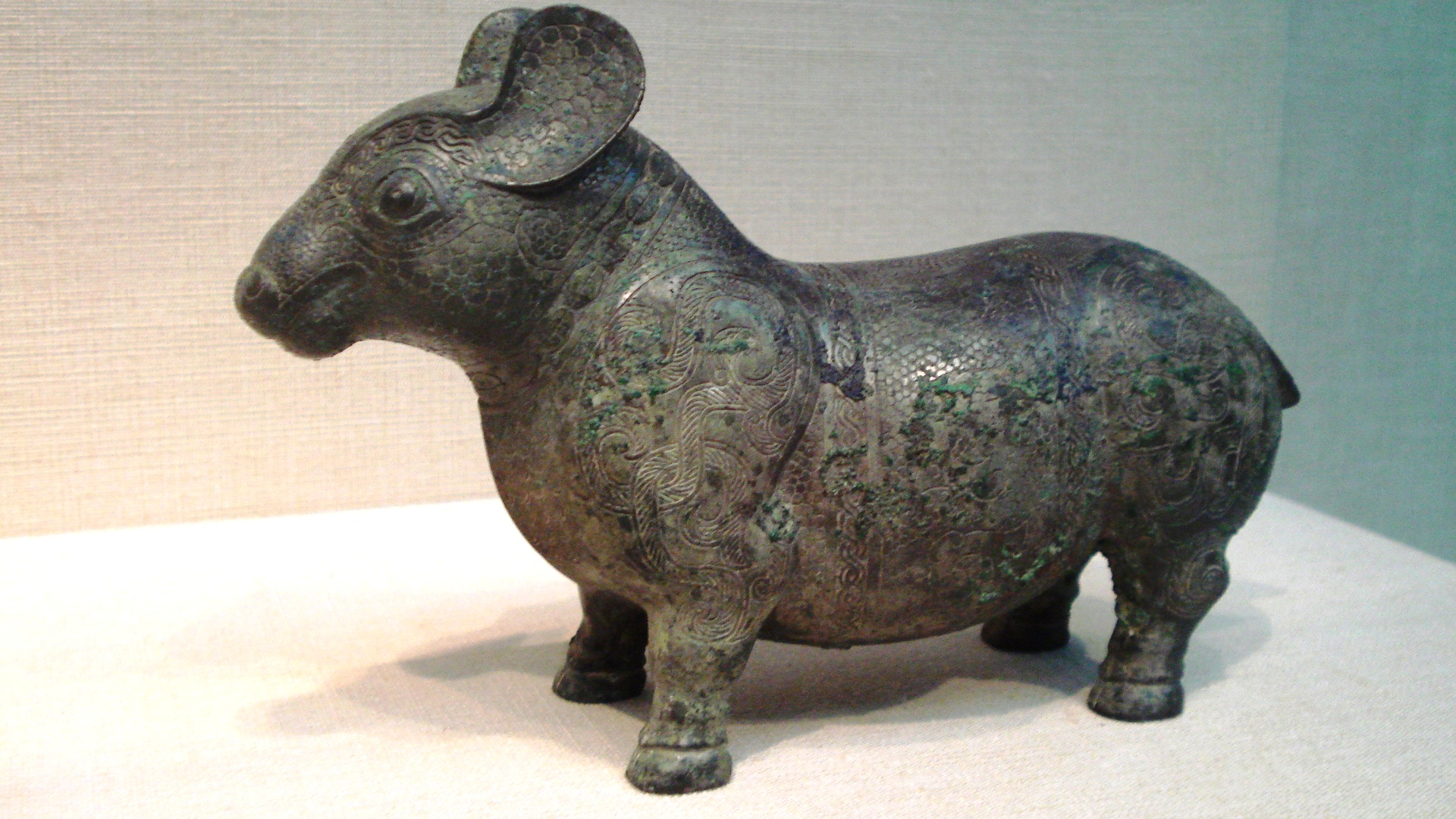
Eastern Zhou dynasty animal-shaped bronze, c. 6th-5th century BCE, Freer Gallery of Art

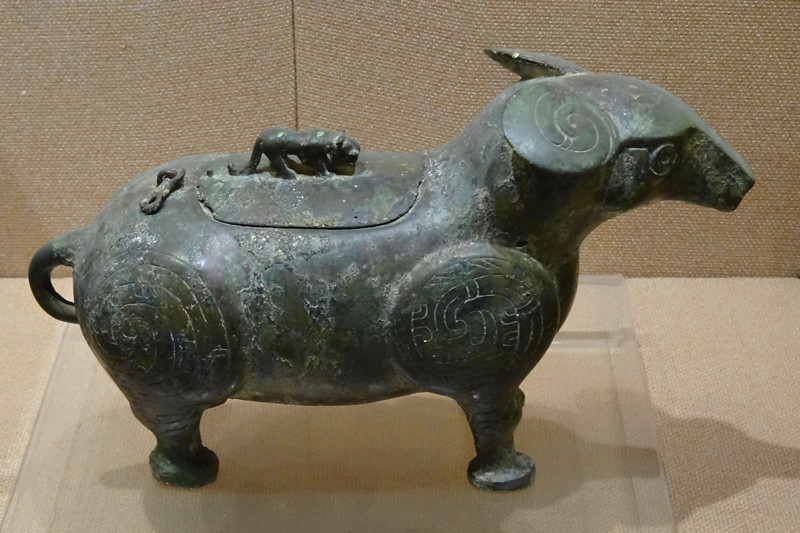
Western Zhou dynasty animal-shaped bronze zun wine vessel, c. 10th century BCE, Baoji Bronzeware Museum

Identifying ancient zoomorphic Chinese ritual bronzes as "tapirs" provides a final example of mò misunderstandings. Some modern scholars, unaware that mò did not denote the tapir until the 19th century, identify a type of Zhou dynasty animal-shaped bronzes as tapirs, paralleling Abel-Rémusat's fallacy: "if the creature depicted in an old image or object sufficiently resembles the creature we recognize in nature it must be the creature we recognize". Two examples of zoomorphic bronzes seen as mò tapirs date from the Western Zhou (c. 1046–771 BC) and Eastern Zhou (770–255 BC) periods.

William Watson was the first to apply the label "tapir" to a Chinese bronze, identifying one in a set of four Eastern Zhou sculptures looted in Shanxi during the 1920s, which are displayed in the British Museum and the Freer Gallery of Art. Thomas Lawton later said that the quadruped "bears a general resemblance to a tapir". Clay molds for casting this type of sculpture were discovered in the excavation of an ancient bronzeware foundry at Houma, Shanxi, which was the capital of Jin state during the 6th and 5th centuries BCE.

An earlier Western Zhou example is a Baoji Bronzeware Museum zoomorphic zun wine vessel discovered in the 1970s at Rujiazhuang (茹家莊), Baoji, Shaanxi, with a long snout serving as the spout, and which the preliminary report described as sheep-shaped with curled horns. Hayashi Minao identified this animal as a tapir, and treated the zoologically impossible horns as whorl-shaped ears that signified the tapir's supernatural power of hearing, without any supporting evidence. Sun Ji also believed it was a stylized Malaysian tapir, and recognized it as the chimerical elephant-trunked mò that Bo Yuji described, ignoring the uniform early descriptions of the mò as bear-like.
