= Jules Quicherat =

French historian and archaeologist (1814–1882)

Jules Étienne Joseph Quicherat
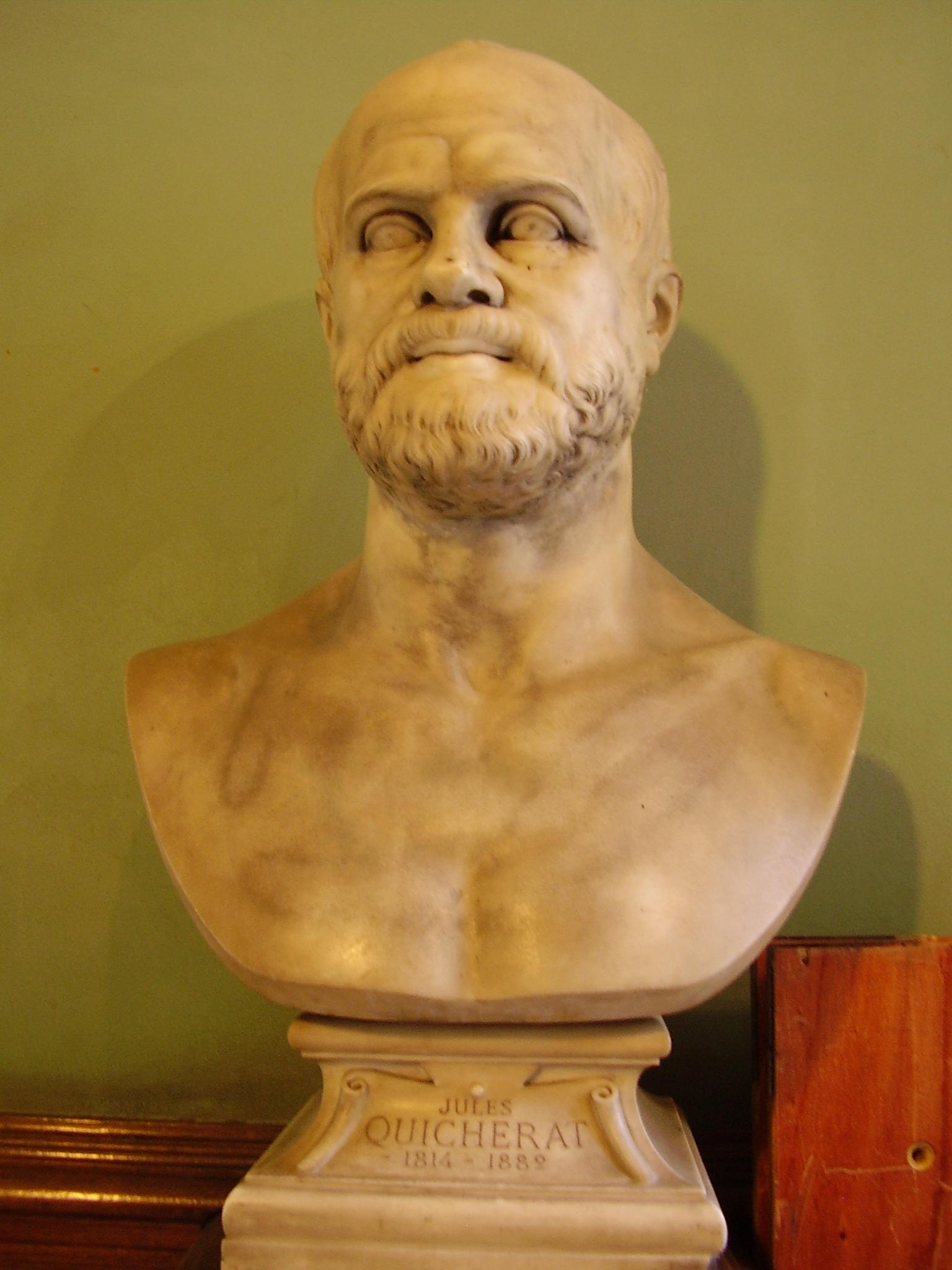
- Bust of Jules Quicherat, in the hall of the École des Chartes
- Born: 13 October 1814; Paris
- Died: 8 April 1882 (aged 67); Paris
- Education: École des Chartes
- Scientific career
- Fields: archaeologist

Jules Étienne Joseph Quicherat (13 October 1814 – 8 April 1882) was a French historian and archaeologist.

His father, a working cabinet-maker, came from Paray-le-Monial to Paris to support his large family; Quicherat was born there. He was fifteen years younger than his brother Louis, a great Latin scholar and lexicographer, who survived him. Although very poor, he was admitted to the College of Sainte-Barbe, where he received a thorough classical education. He showed his gratitude to this establishment by writing its history in three volumes, published between 1860 and 1864. At the end of his studies, he hesitated for some time before deciding what career to follow until Jules Michelet ended his indecision by inspiring him with a taste for history.

In 1835, Quicherat entered the École des Chartes; he left two years later at the head of the college. Once more inspired by the example of Michelet, who had just written an admirable work on Joan of Arc, he published the text of the two trials of Joan, adding much contemporary evidence on her heroism in his Procès de condamnation et de réhabilitation de Jeanne d'Arc (5 vols. 1841-1849), as well as half a volume of Aperçus nouveaux sur l'histoire de Jeanne d'Arc, in which it seems that the last word has been said on important points.

From the 15th century, he drew other inspirations. In 1844, he published memoirs of the adventures of a brigand, Rodrigue de Villandrando, which gradually grew into a volume full of fresh matter. He wrote full biographies of two chroniclers of Louis XI, one very obscure, Jean Castel, and the other, Thomas Basin, bishop of Lisieux, who was, on the contrary, a remarkable politician, prelate, and chronicler. Between 1855 and 1859, Quicherat published the latter's works, most of which were now brought out for the first time. In addition to these he wrote Fragments inédits de Georges Chastellain and Lettres, mémoires et autres documents relatifs à la guerre du bien public en 1465.

These works did not wholly occupy his time: in 1847, he inaugurated a course of archaeological lectures at the École des Chartes, and in 1849, was appointed professor of diplomatics at the same college. His teaching had exceptional results. Although he was not eloquent and had a nasal voice, his hearers were loath to miss any of his thoughtful teachings, which were unbiased and well-expressed. Of his lectures, the public saw only some articles on special subjects, which were distributed in several reviews. Note should be made of a short treatise on La Formation française des anciens noms de lieu published in 1867, and a memoir De l'ogive et de l'architecture ogivale published in 1850, where he gives his theory on the use of stone arches important for the history of religious architecture. In an 1874 article on L'âge de la cathédrale de Laon, he declared an exact date for the birth of Gothic architecture.

Following the advice of his friends, he began to transcribe his lectures on archaeology towards the end of his life. Still, only the introductory chapters, up to the 11th century, were found among his papers. On the other hand, the pupils trained by him circulated his principles throughout France, recognizing him as the founder of national archaeology. At one point, he seems to have taken a false step; with a warmth and pertinacity worthy of a better cause, he maintained the identity of Caesar's Alesia with Alaise, and he died without becoming a convert to the opinion, now almost universally accepted, that Alise Sainte-Reine is the place where Vercingetorix capitulated. But even this error benefited science; some well-directed excavations at Alaise brought many Roman remains to light, which were subsequently sent to enrich the museum at Besançon.

After 1871, his course of lectures on diplomatics having been given up, Quicherat, still a professor of archaeology, was nominated director of the Ecole des Chartes. He filled this post with the same energy he had shown in the many scientific commissions he had taken part in. In 1878, he gave up his duties as professor, which then fell to the most conspicuous of his pupils, Robert de Lasteyrie. He died suddenly in Paris on April 8, 1882, a short time after correcting the proofs of Supplément aux témoignages contemporains de Jeanne d'Arc, published in the Revue Historique.

After his death, it was decided to bring out his hitherto unpublished papers; among these are some important fragments of his archaeological lectures, but his Histoire de la laine, with which he was occupied for many years, is missing.

== Selected publications ==
- Procès de condamnation et de réhabilitation de Jeanne d'Arc, 5 vol., 1841-1849. Available online: tome I, tome II, tome III, tome IV, tome V.
- Aperçus nouveaux sur l'histoire de Jeanne d'Arc, 1850
- Thomas Basin, 1855-1859
- L'Alésia de César rendue à la Franche-Comté, 1857
- Histoire de sainte Barbe, 1860-1864. Available online: tome I, tome II, tome III.
- De la formation française des anciens noms de lieu, 1867
- Histoire du costume en France, 1875
- Rodrigue de Villandrando. L'un des combattants pour l'indépendance française au quinzième siècle 1879
- posthumous collection : Mélanges d'archéologie et d'histoire (1885-1886), containing la Notice sur l’Album de Villard de Honnecourt architecte du XIII^{e} siècle (written in 1849)
