= Éternoz =

Commune in Doubs department, France

- Part of Éternoz-Vallée-du-Lison
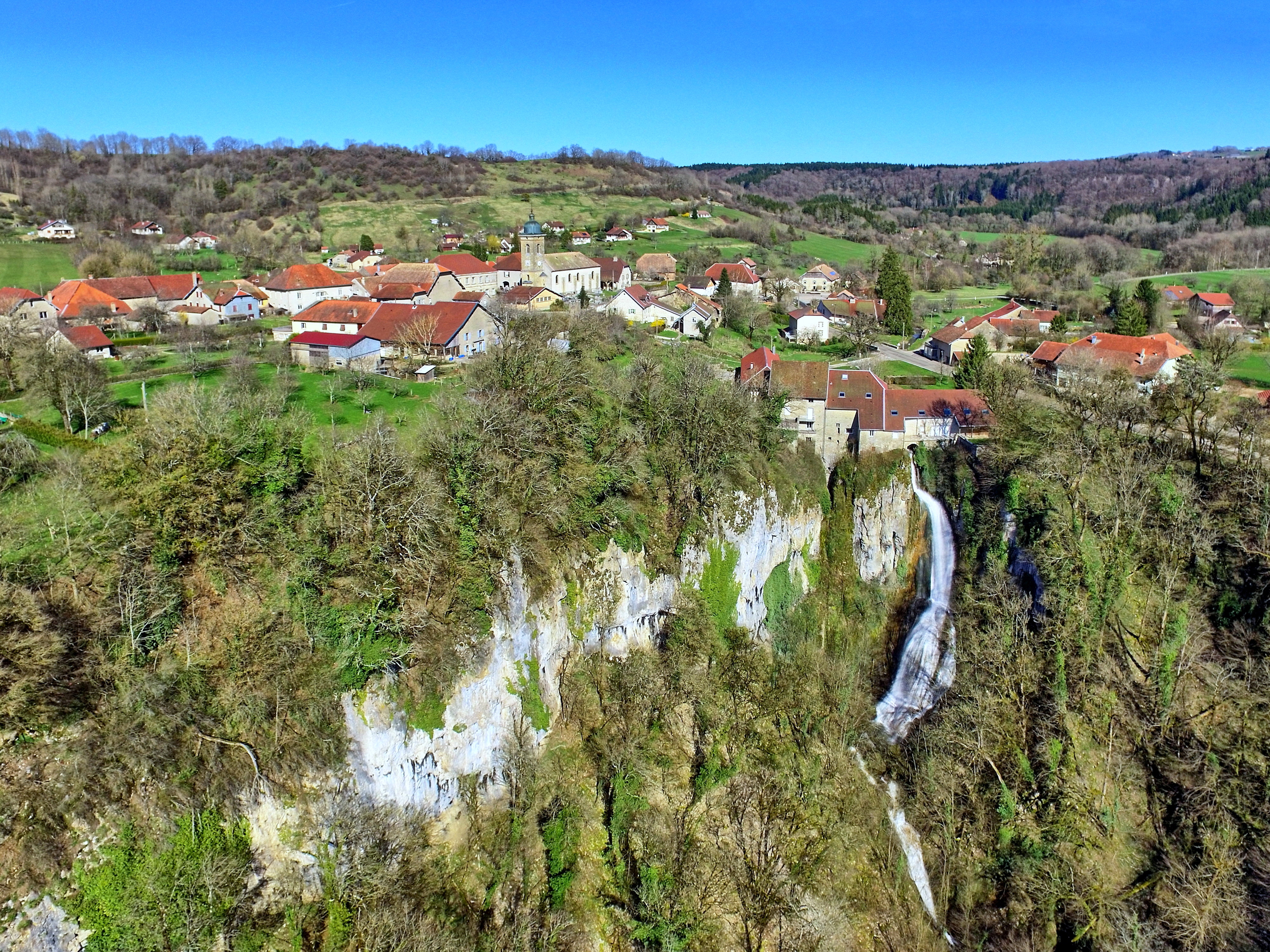
- The village and the Vau waterfall
- Location of Éternoz
- Location within France Location within Bourgogne-Franche-Comté
- Coordinates: 47°00′28″N 6°01′49″E
- Country: France
- Region: Bourgogne-Franche-Comté
- Department: Doubs
- Arrondissement: Besançon
- Canton: Ornans
- Commune: Éternoz-Vallée-du-Lison
- Area^{1}: 29.26 km^{2} (11.30 sq mi)
- Highest elevation: 670 m (2,200 ft)
- Lowest elevation: 315 m (1,033 ft)
- Population (2022): 325
  - Density: 11.1/km^{2} (28.8/sq mi)
- Time zone: UTC+01:00 (CET)
  - Summer (DST): UTC+02:00 (CEST)
- Postal code: 25330
- ^{1} French Land Register data, which excludes lakes, ponds, glaciers > 1 km^{2} (0.386 sq mi or 247 acres) and river estuaries.

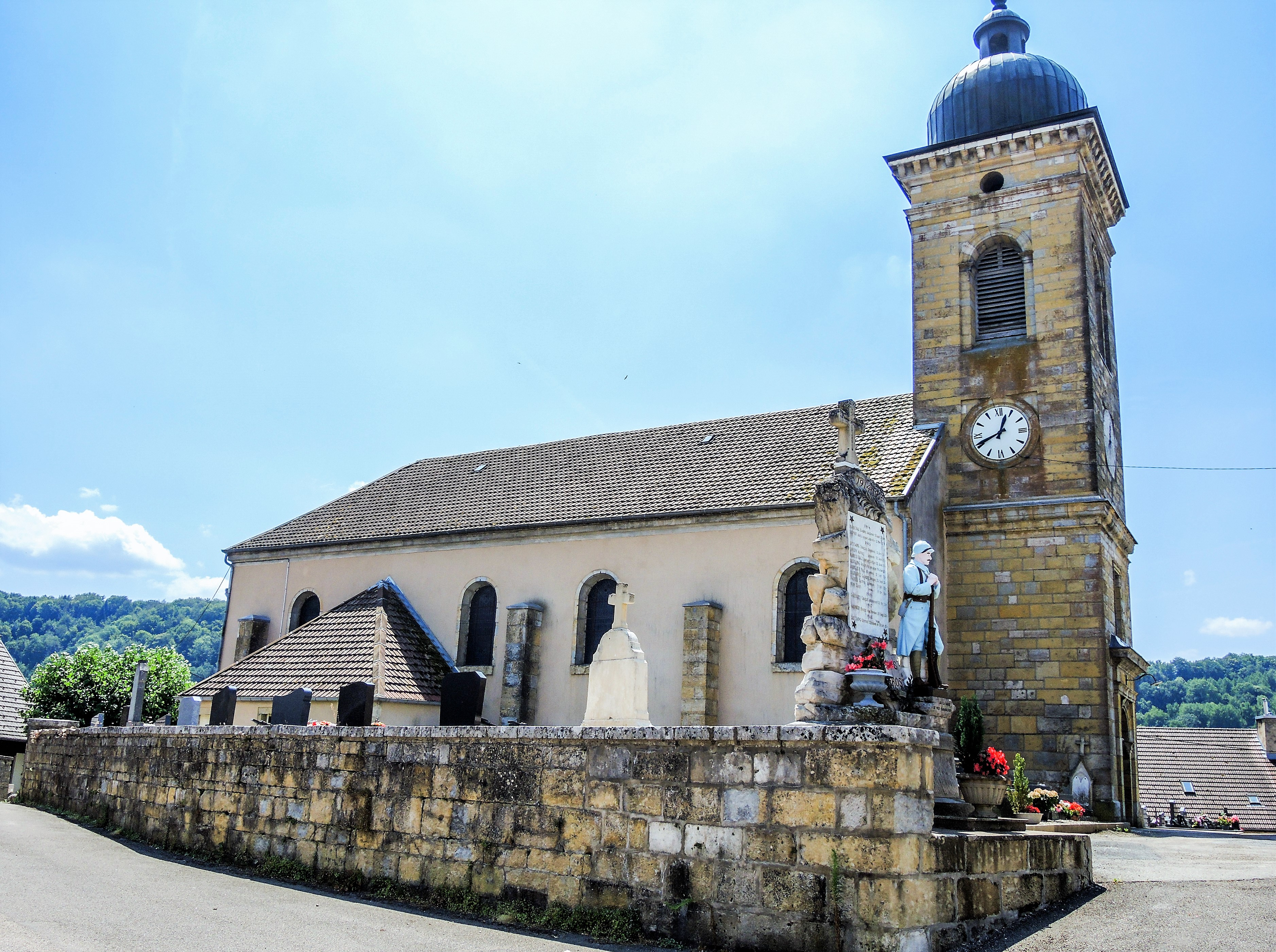
Eglise Saint-Laurent d'Eternoz

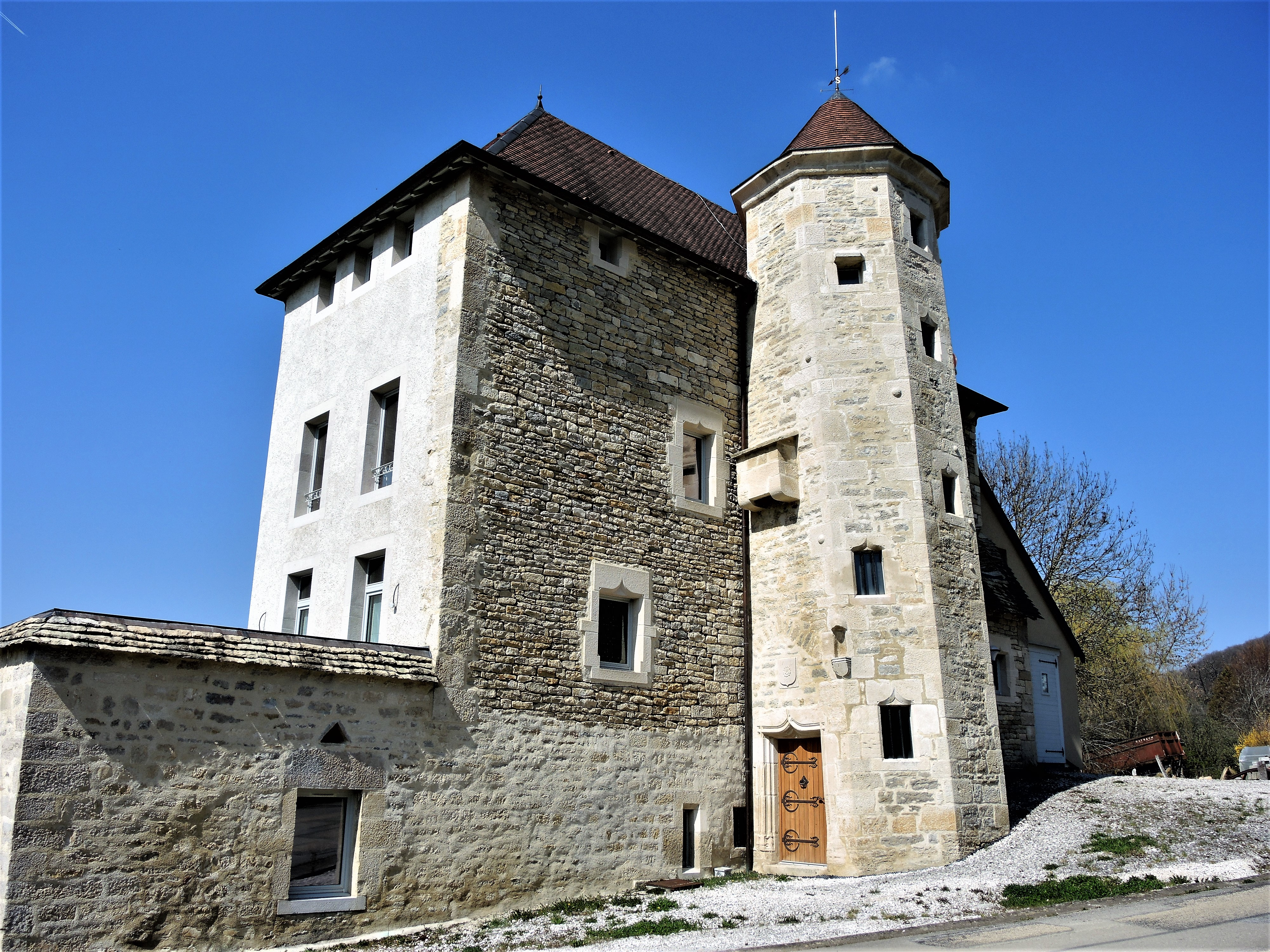
Chateau de Refranche

Éternoz (French pronunciation: [etɛʁno]) is a former commune in the Doubs department in the Bourgogne-Franche-Comté region in eastern France. It was merged with Saraz to form Éternoz-Vallée-du-Lison on 1 January 2025.

== Geography ==
Eternoz is 26 kilometres from Besançon, the department capital. It sits on the second plateau of the Jura massif at an altitude of 549 m (1,801 ft). The River Vau passes through the village and plunges down a 40-meter waterfall on the edge of the village before joining the river Lison.

In 1973, the commune Éternoz absorbed the following former communes:

- Alaise (42 inhabitants in 2025)
- Coulans-sur-Lizon (22 inhabitants)
- Doulaize (20 inhabitants)
- Refranche (18 inhabitants)

== Notable buildings ==
The parish church, dedicated to Saint Laurent, was built in 1804. It has a single nave and belltower, with a round dome that is unusual in the region.

The chateau of Refranche was built in the 16th century by a branch of the Eternoz family. Until recently, only part of the main building and a tower remained, but it has recently been renovated.

For three generations, the Société Garnier had its workshop in Eternoz. In 1913, a local blacksmith, Jean Garnier, founded a forge that made and sold ploughs. By 1953, the business had sold 5000 ploughs, but this progressively gave way to the sale of more innovative and diverse farm machinery from the 1960s onwards. The resulting expansion led to the decision, in 2008, to move the company to new and larger premises 15 km away in Levier.

== Notable people ==
- Alfred Billot (1925–1965), was Catholic priest, and missionary in Cameroon.
- Marie-Léone Bordy (1921–1992), a nun of the congregation of the Filles de Notre-Dame du Sacré-cœur in Issoudun, was assassinated in Djoum, Cameroun.
- Auguste Castan, librarian, historian, and archaeologist; excavated Roman remains in Besançon on the site of which a square is named in his honour.
- Édouard Clerc, historian.
- Georges Colomb (1856–1945), a botanist, science populariser, and pioneer of comics.
- Alphonse Delacroix (1807–1878), architect.
- Pierre-Michel Duffieux (1891–1976), a physicist and founder of Fourier Optics. Lecturer and researcher at the University of Franche-Comté. Lived at Coulans-sur-Lison.
- Emmanuelle Garnier (1964 - ), professor and currently president of the University of Toulouse-Jean Jaurès, originally from Doulaize.
- Pierre Lorius (1925–2014), a professional footballer (goalkeeper). Played with Racing Besançon (1952–1954) FC Sochaux (1949–1952) and Lyon OU (1945–1947).
- Jean Mennerat (1917–2007), a member of the French resistance, lived in Coulans-sur-Lison. Owned the world's largest collection of books about chess (27,500 volumes) which he bequeathed to the city of Belfort.
- Jules Quicherat (1814–1882), historian, archaeologist, professor at the École nationale des chartes.

== Etymology ==
The name of the village has evolved. It has been called Esternoz (1262), Esternos (1275), Esternoch (1280), Esternoz dessoz Monmaour (1294), and Sternol (14th century). The name appears to be of Germanic origin and may mean "valley of beech trees".

== Demographics ==
Historical population
Year	Pop.	±% p.a.
1968	400	—
1975	333	−2.58%
1982	324	−0.39%
1990	295	−1.17%
1999	288	−0.27%
2009	336	+1.55%
2014	341	+0.30%
2020	322	−0.95%
Source: INSEE

== Politics and administration ==
List of mayors

Start	Finish	Name
1953	1971	Joseph Cœurdevey
1971	1989	Roland Garnier
1989	2001	Bernard Cœurdevey
2001	2007	Jean Bourgeois
2007	2008	Paul Vieille
2008	2014	Bernard Saulnier
2014	2020	
2020	2025	Christophe Garnier

== See also ==
- Communes of the Doubs department
