= Éternoz-Vallée-du-Lison =

- Commune
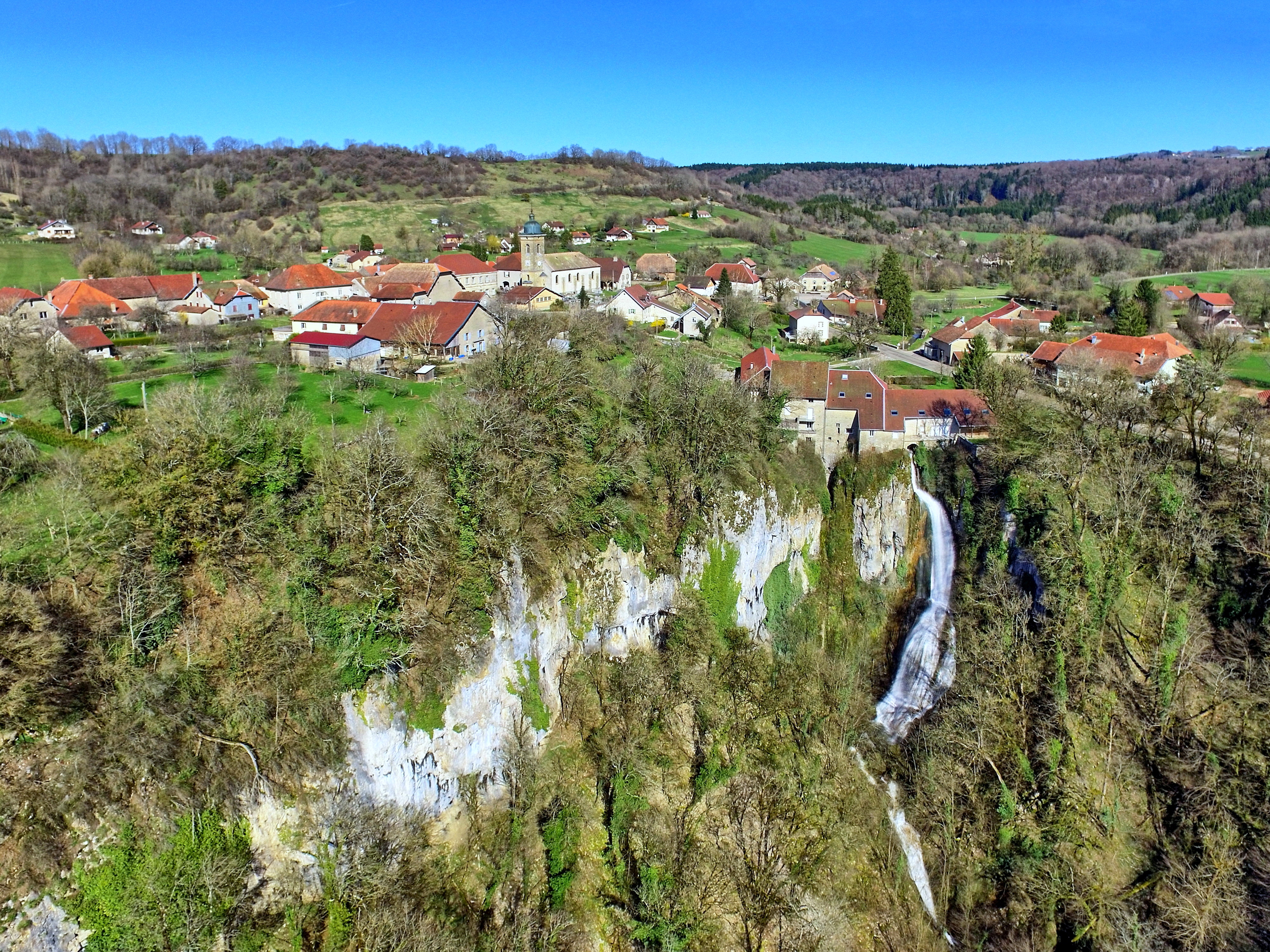
- The village Éternoz and the Vau waterfall
- Location of Éternoz-Vallée-du-Lison
- Location within France Location within Bourgogne-Franche-Comté
- Coordinates: 47°00′28″N 6°01′49″E
- Country: France
- Region: Bourgogne-Franche-Comté
- Department: Doubs
- Arrondissement: Besançon
- Canton: Ornans
- Intercommunality: Loue-Lison

Government
  - Mayor (2025–2026): Christophe Garnier
- Area^{1}: 35.28 km^{2} (13.62 sq mi)
- Highest elevation: 670 m (2,200 ft)
- Lowest elevation: 315 m (1,033 ft)
- Population (2023): 343
  - Density: 9.72/km^{2} (25.2/sq mi)
- Time zone: UTC+01:00 (CET)
  - Summer (DST): UTC+02:00 (CEST)
- INSEE/Postal code: 25223 /25330
- ^{1} French Land Register data, which excludes lakes, ponds, glaciers > 1 km^{2} (0.386 sq mi or 247 acres) and river estuaries.

Éternoz-Vallée-du-Lison (French pronunciation: [etɛʁno vale dy lizɔ̃], lit. 'Éternoz-Lison Valley') is a commune in the Doubs department in the Bourgogne-Franche-Comté region in eastern France. It was formed on 1 January 2025, with the merger of Éternoz and Saraz.

== See also ==
- Communes of the Doubs department
