= Saraz, Doubs =

Saraz
- Part of Éternoz-Vallée-du-Lison
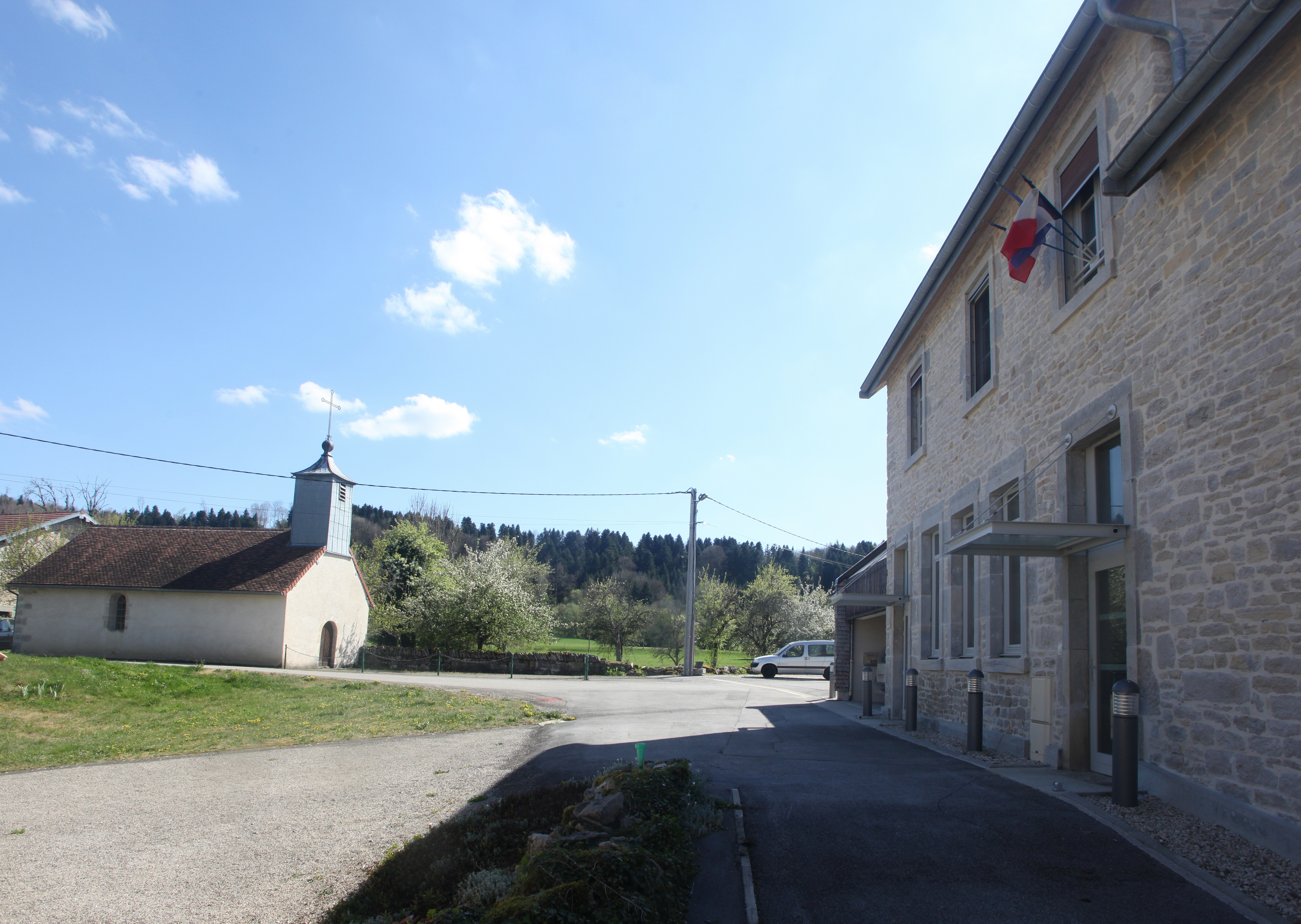
- The chapel and town hall in Saraz
- Location of Saraz
- Location within France Location within Bourgogne-Franche-Comté
- Coordinates: 46°59′51″N 5°59′00″E
- Country: France
- Region: Bourgogne-Franche-Comté
- Department: Doubs
- Arrondissement: Besançon
- Canton: Ornans
- Commune: Éternoz-Vallée-du-Lison
- Area^{1}: 6.02 km^{2} (2.32 sq mi)
- Highest elevation: 622 m (2,041 ft)
- Lowest elevation: 345 m (1,132 ft)
- Population (2022): 20
  - Density: 3.3/km^{2} (8.6/sq mi)
- Time zone: UTC+01:00 (CET)
  - Summer (DST): UTC+02:00 (CEST)
- Postal code: 25330
- ^{1} French Land Register data, which excludes lakes, ponds, glaciers > 1 km^{2} (0.386 sq mi or 247 acres) and river estuaries.

Saraz (French pronunciation: [saʁa]) is a former commune in the Doubs department in the Bourgogne-Franche-Comté region in eastern France. It was merged with Éternoz to form Éternoz-Vallée-du-Lison on 1 January 2025.

== Geography ==
Saraz lies 13 km (8.1 mi) southwest of Amancey.

== Population ==
Historical population
Year	Pop.	±% p.a.
1968	33	—
1975	32	−0.44%
1982	21	−5.84%
1990	23	+1.14%
1999	21	−1.01%
2007	22	+0.58%
2012	10	−14.59%
2017	11	+1.92%
Source: INSEE

== See also ==
- Communes of the Doubs department
