= Charles de Lasteyrie =

French banker and politician

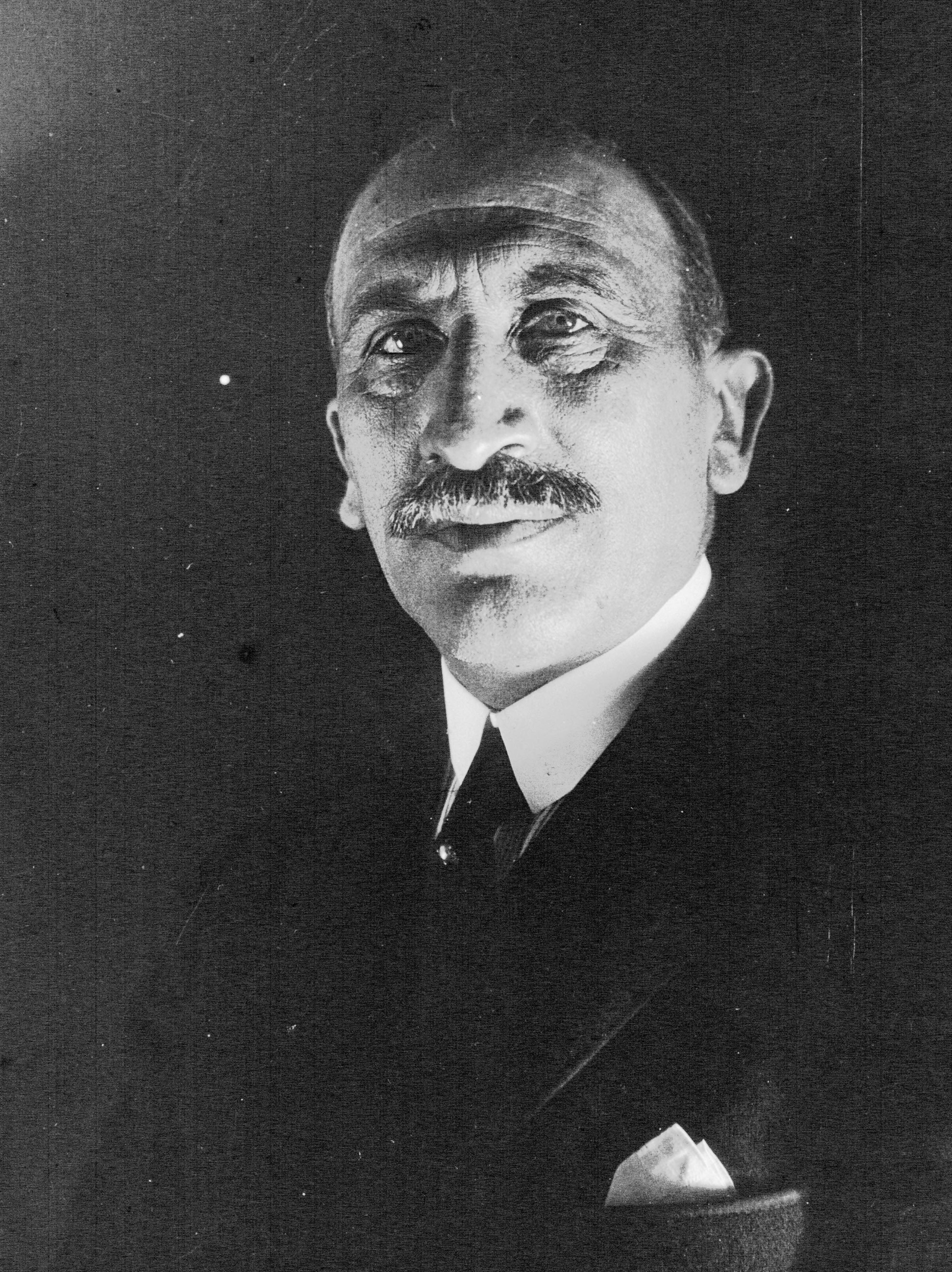
- Charles de Lasteyrie in 1933
- Born: 27 August 1877; Paris, France
- Died: 28 June 1936 (aged 58); Paris, France
- Education: École des chartes
- Occupation: Politician
- Parent: Robert de Lasteyrie
- Relatives: Charles Philibert de Lasteyrie (paternal great-grandfather); Ferdinand de Lasteyrie (paternal grandfather)

Charles de Lasteyrie (1877-1936) was a French banker and politician. He served as a member of the Chamber of Deputies from 1919 to 1924, representing Corrèze, and from 1928 to 1936, representing the Seine department. He served as the French Minister of Finance from 15 January 1922 to 26 March 1924. He died on 28 June 1936.
