= Ferdinand de Lasteyrie =

French politician (1810–1879)

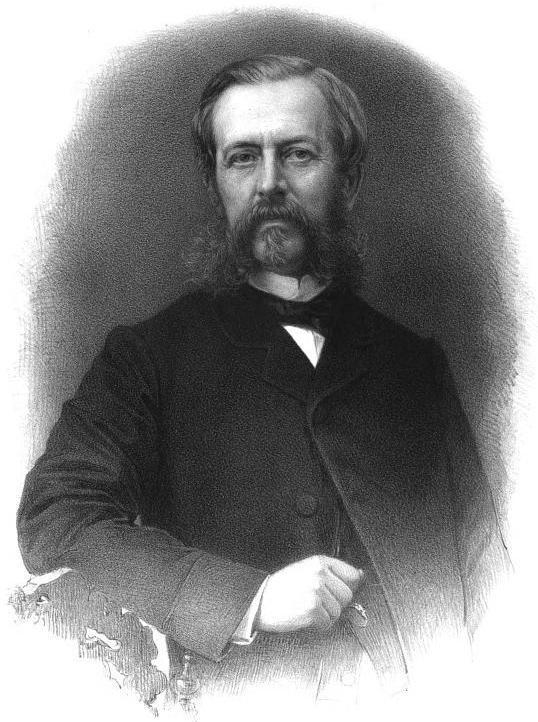
- Born: Ferdinand Charles Léon de Lasteyrie du Saillant; June 15, 1810; Paris, France
- Died: May 12, 1879; Paris, France
- Occupation: Politician
- Children: Robert de Lasteyrie
- Parent: Charles Philibert de Lasteyrie
- Relatives: Charles de Lasteyrie (grandson)

Ferdinand de Lasteyrie (1810-1879) was a French politician. He served as a member of the Chamber of Deputies from 1842 to 1846, representing Seine, and as a member of the National Assembly from 1848 to 1851, also representing Seine. He died on May 12, 1879.

Il est l'auteur d'un ouvrage important intitulé « Histoire de la Peinture sur Verre, d'après ses monuments en France ».
