= Kaii-Yōkai Denshō Database =

Japanese folklore and mythology database

The Kaii-Yōkai Denshō Database (怪異・妖怪伝承データベース) is a database of yōkai and mystery stories which have been collected from Japanese folklore. The database is published by International Research Center for Japanese Studies. The prototype was created on March 19, 2002, and the first live version was released on June 20, 2002. the project supervisor is Kazuhiko Komatsu (小松和彦), a Japanese folklorist who is a professor of the study of yōkai.

The database includes verbal information, without visual information. Data are collected from:

- Akira Takeda (竹田旦) "民俗学関係雑誌文献総覧" 1978
- "日本随筆大成" 1975 - 1978
- Kunio Yanagita "妖怪名彙"
- Books of histories of Japanese local governments.

For each item, in the database has an abstract of around 100 characters. The full text is searchable, and the database can be searched by name or the region where the item was found.
