= Alaise =

- Part of Éternoz
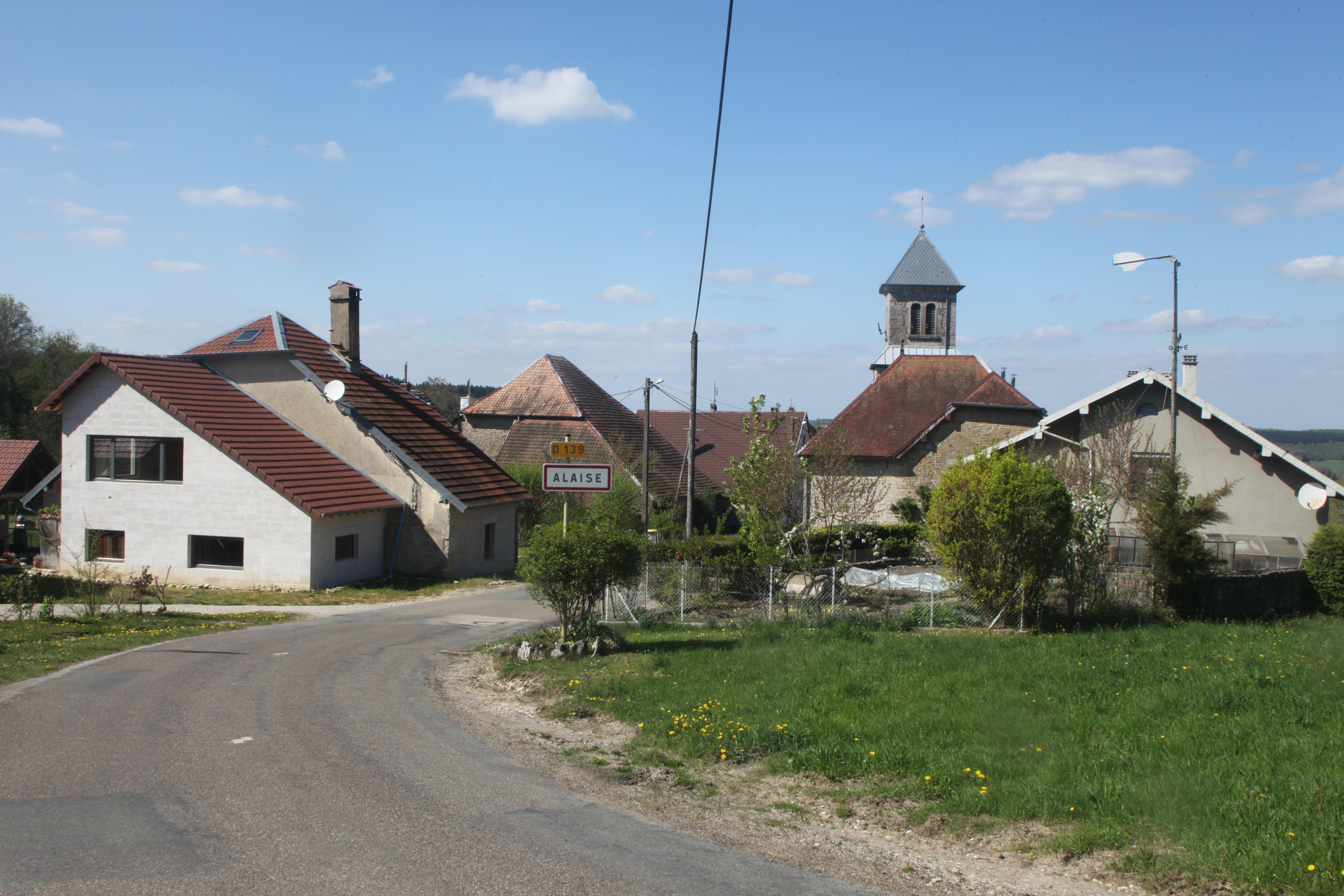
- View of the village
- Location of Alaise
- Location within France Location within Bourgogne-Franche-Comté
- Coordinates: 47°00′57″N 5°58′21″E
- Country: France
- Region: Bourgogne-Franche-Comté
- Department: Doubs
- Arrondissement: Besançon
- Canton: Ornans
- Commune: Éternoz
- Population (2022): 42
- Time zone: UTC+01:00 (CET)
  - Summer (DST): UTC+02:00 (CEST)
- Postal code: 25330

Alaise is a former commune in the Doubs department in the Bourgogne-Franche-Comté region in eastern France. It was merged into Éternoz in 1973.

== See also ==
- Battle of Alesia
