= Charles Philibert de Lasteyrie =

French agronomist, lithographer, and philanthropist

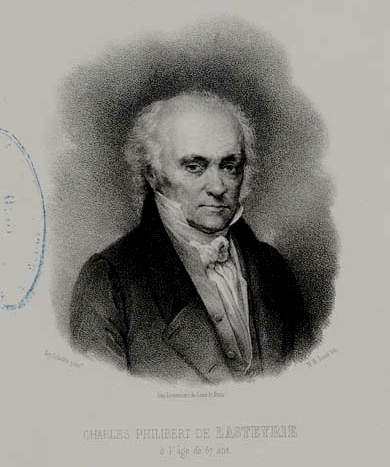
- Born: 1759; Brive-la-Gaillarde, Corrèze, France
- Died: 1849 (aged 89–90); Paris, France
- Occupations: Agronomist, printer, philanthropist
- Children: Ferdinand de Lasteyrie
- Relatives: Robert de Lasteyrie (grandson); Charles de Lasteyrie (great-grandson)

Charles Philibert de Lasteyrie (4 November 1759 – 5 November 1849) was a French agronomist, lithographer and philanthropist.

== Works (partial list) ==
- The History of Auricular Confession, Religiously, Morally and Politically Considered, among Ancient and Modern Nations (English ed., 1848) vol. 1 vol. 2
