= Robert de Lasteyrie =

French archivist and politician

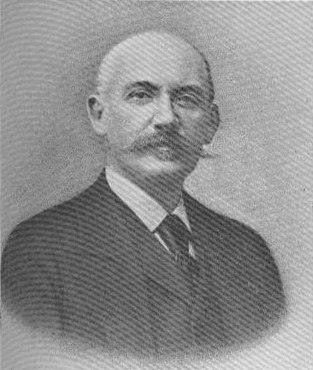
- Robert de Lasteyrie in 1914
- Born: Robert, Charles de Lasteyrie du Saillant; 15 November 1849; Paris, France
- Died: 29 January 1921 (aged 71); Allassac, Corrèze, France
- Education: Collège Rollin
- Alma mater: École Nationale des Chartes
- Occupations: Archivist, art historian, archeologist, politician
- Children: Charles de Lasteyrie
- Parent: Ferdinand de Lasteyrie
- Relatives: Charles Philibert de Lasteyrie (paternal grandfather)

Robert de Lasteyrie (15 November 1849 – 29 January 1921) was a French archivist, art historian, archeologist and politician. He served as a member of the Chamber of Deputies from 1893 to 1898, representing Corrèze.

== Sources ==
- Cuq, Édouard (1921). "Robert de Lasteyrie (1849-1921)". Bibliothèque de l'École des chartes (in French). 82: 237–247.
