= Louis-Marie Quicherat =

French Latinist

Louis-Marie Quicherat (13 October 1799 – 17 November 1884) was a French Latinist known for his Latin dictionaries. He was elected a member of the Académie des inscriptions et belles-lettres in 1864, and appointed an Officer of the Legion of Honour in 1876.

Quicherat is referenced in the short story "Funes the Memorious" by Jorge Luis Borges.

== Selected works ==
- Dictionnaire latin-français. Hachette. 1846 – via Library of Congress.
- Dictionnaire français-latin. Hachette. 1858.
