= Edme Gaulle =

French sculptor

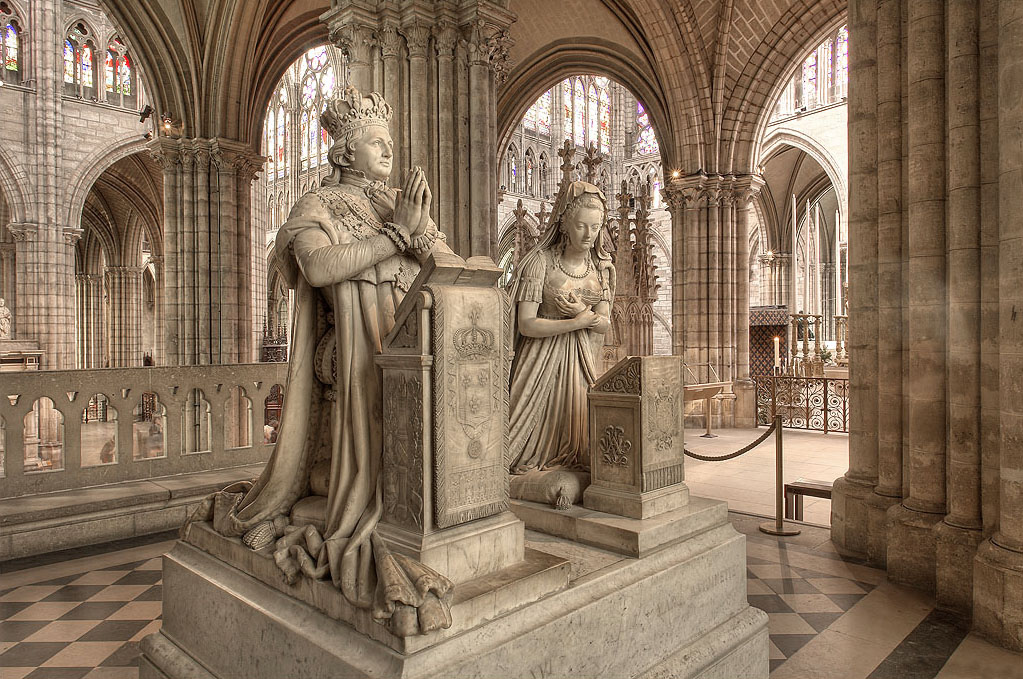
Funerary monuments (not tombs) of Louis XVI and Marie Antoinette, Basilica of Saint-Denis

Edme Gaulle (1762, Langres - January 1841, Paris) was a French sculptor.

== Life ==
He began by studying drawing with Francois Devosge at the school in Dijon, then going to follow Jean Guillaume Moitte's course at the École des Beaux-Arts in Paris. He won the second prize for sculpture in 1791 with Pericles coming to visit Anaxagoras, and the first prize for sculpture (Prix de Rome) in 1803 for Ulysses recognising his nurse Eurycleia, but the Napoleonic Wars prevented him setting out for Rome for his stay at the Villa Medici. He and François Rude were two of the thirty sculptors charged with the sculpture of the colonne de la Grande Armée on place Vendôme in Paris.

He was an expert consultant on the restoration of the bas-relief of the pediment of the Panthéon de Paris, realised by David d'Angers in 1830. This pediment was originally sculpted by his master Moitte in 1793 and was practically destroyed in 1822, with Edme Gaulle succeeding in conserving the fragments that were left. He had made several sketches of the pediment before its destruction, but had been unable to prevent it. In 1831, he was made inspecteur conservateur of the Dépôt des marbres of the Ministry of Public Works, on île des cygnes, founded by Colbert.

== Main works ==
- a marble statue of a kneeling Louis XVI, for the église de Saint-Denis : Praying Marie-Antoinette and Louis XVI (commissioned by Louis XVIII in 1816 from Edme Gaulle and Pierre Petitot, realised in 1830).
- bust of Claude Perrault
- the Study of Nature, bas-relief for a planned fountain on place de la Bastille
- two bronze bull's head fountain-heads at 8 rue des Hospitalières-Saint-Gervais, on a building which was originally the cattle shed for the marché des Blancs Manteaux, later converted into a school.
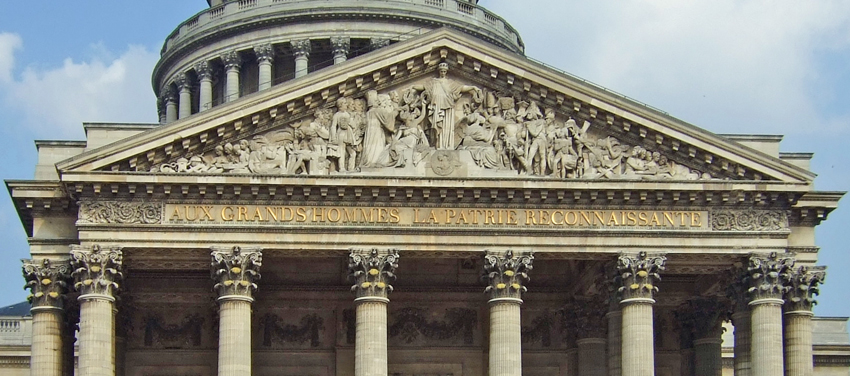
The fatherland crowning illustrious men, bas-relief on the pediment of the Panthéon de Paris.

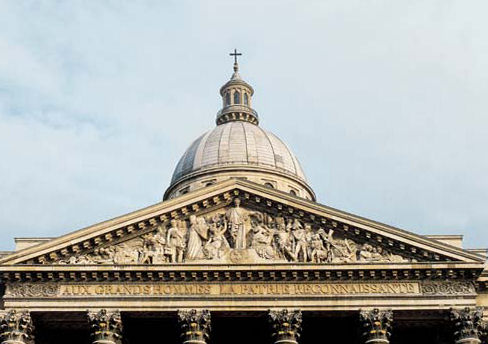
Pediment with the motto of the Panthéon

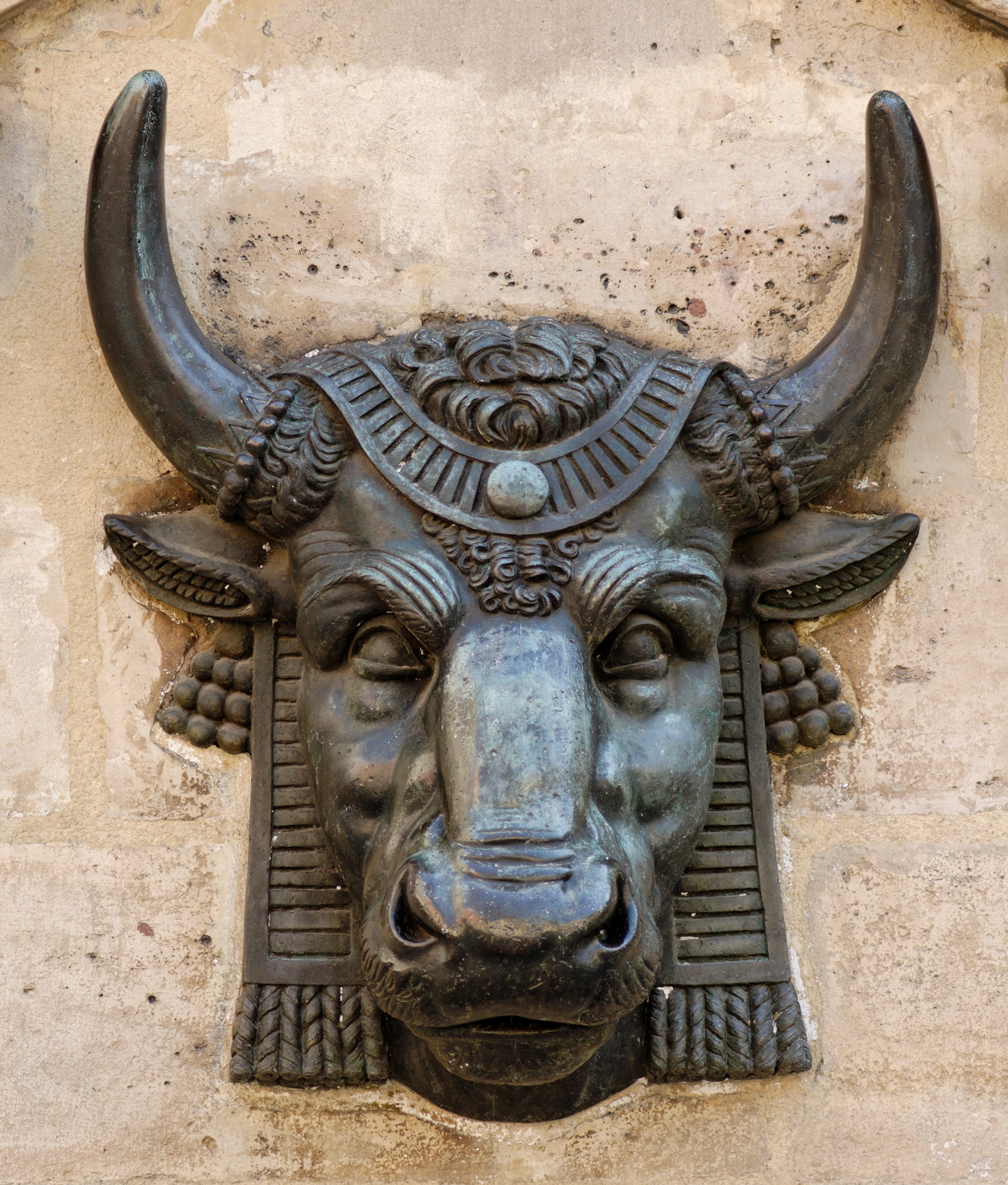
Bronze bull's head, fountainhead of Paris's marché des Blanc-Manteaux (1762-1841), 1819. H. 19 cm (7 ¼ in.)

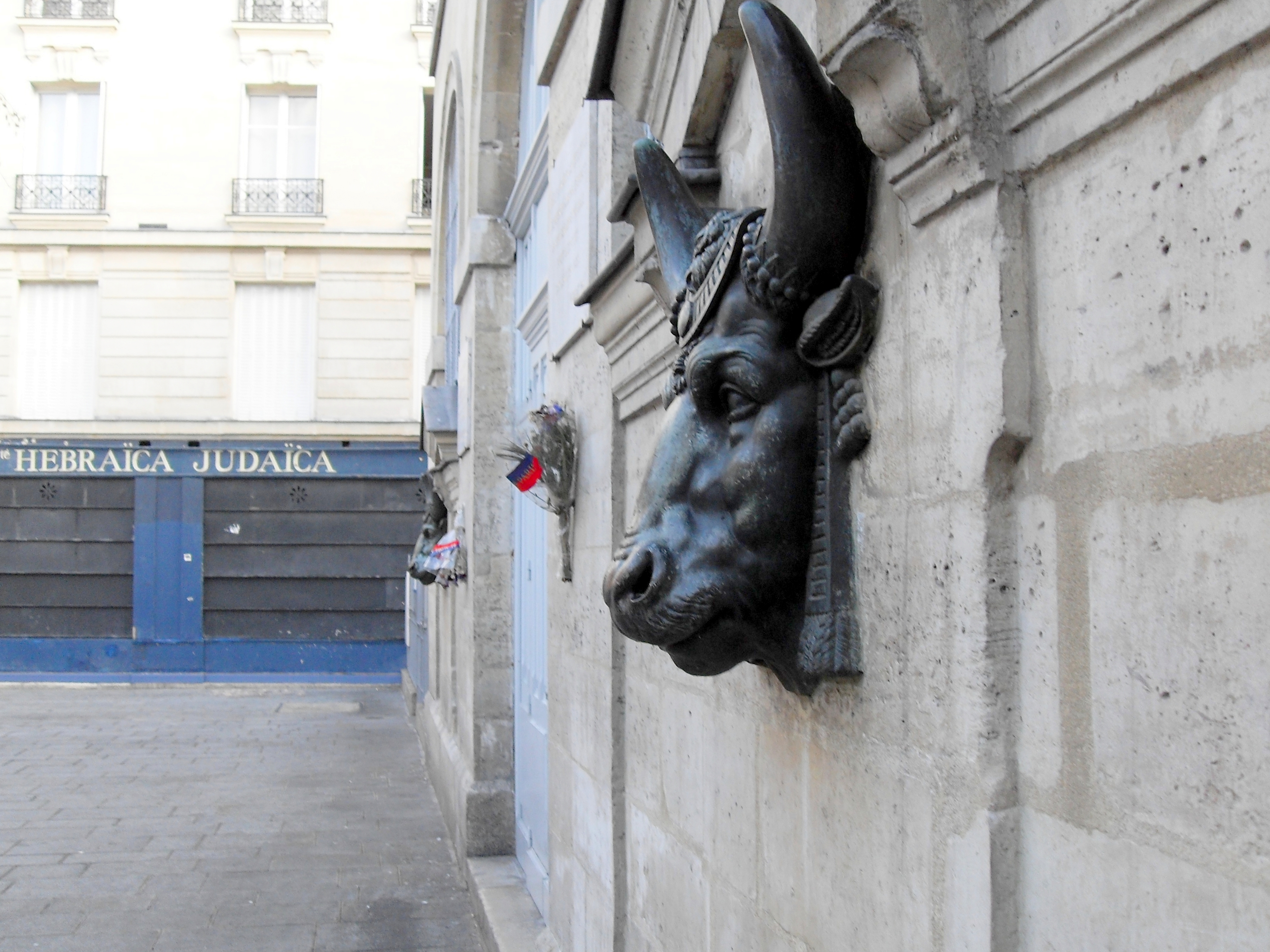
