= Dépôt des marbres =

Building in Paris, France

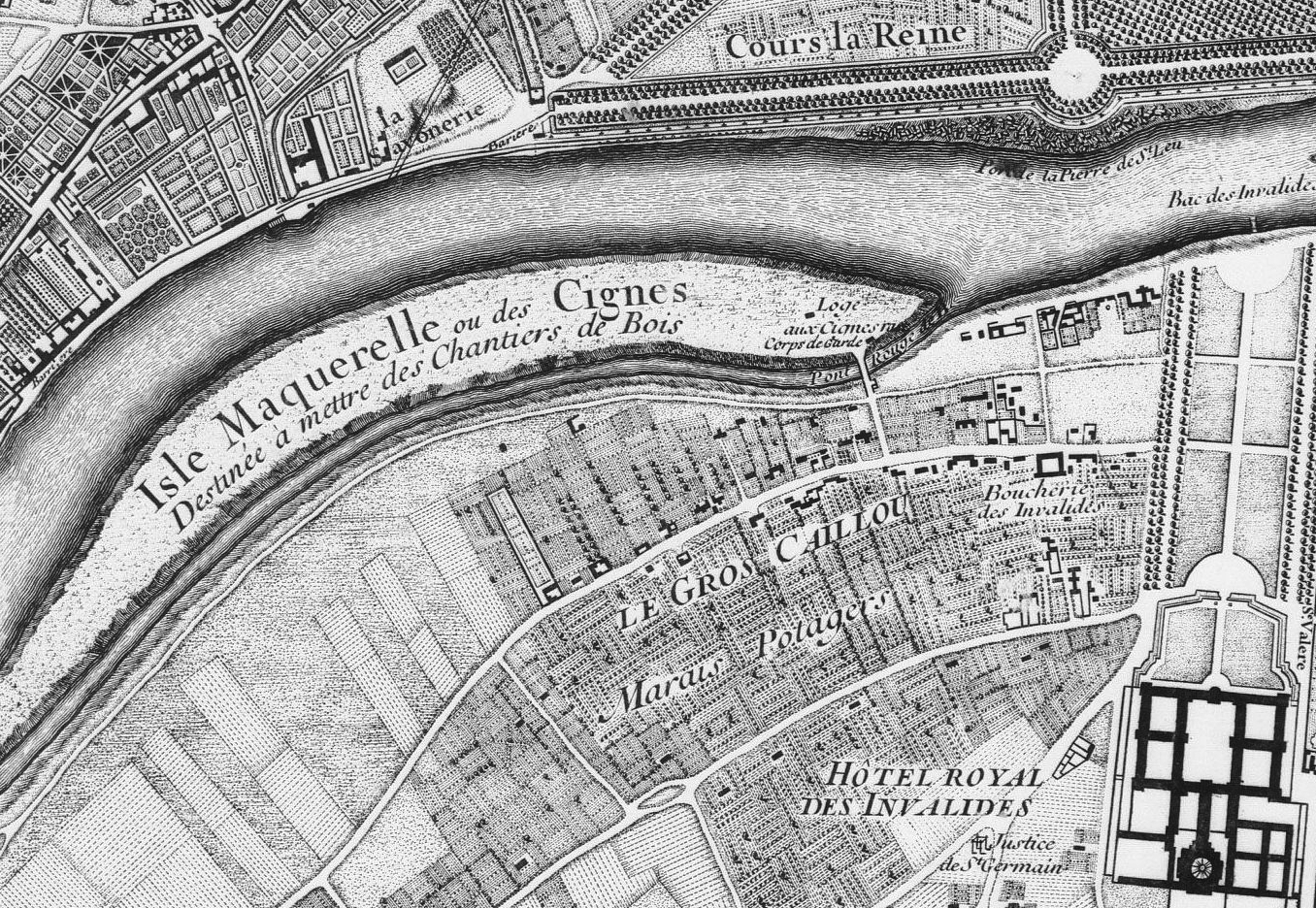
"Isle Maquerelle ou des Cignes", linked to the rive gauche by the "pont rouge" - Roussel's map of Paris, 1731

The Dépôt des marbres (marble depot) of the French Ministry of Public Works was founded on île des Cygnes (Swan Island) in Paris by French minister of finance Jean-Baptiste Colbert. It was used to store marble due to be allocated to artists with state commissions, as well as statues formerly displayed but removed for political and other reasons.

In 1831 Edme Gaulle was made its inspecteur conservateur. On 6 June 1838 Henri Labrouste was made its architect, and Émile Marras also served at it as a conservateur. It was built in the 17th, at a time when the island still had its original name of the Île aux vaches (Cow Island). In the late 19th century, a number of artist's studios were created in a central pavilion, later occupied by artists such as Isidore Pils, Carolus-Duran, Jean-Paul Laurens and Auguste Rodin.

== Sources ==
Jacques Letheve, Daily Life of French Artists in the 19th Century, trans. by Hilary E. Paddon (London: George Allen and Unwin Ltd, 1972 [1968])
