= Claude François Devosge =

French sculptor and architect

Claude François Devosge (1697 - 5 December 1777) was a French sculptor and architect.

He was born in Gray, Haute-Saône, a member of the Devosge family of artists. His brother Philippe was also a sculptor, his grandson Anatole Devosge (1770–1850) was a painter and his son François Devosge (1732–1811) was a French portraitist and history painter. He died in Dijon, aged 80.
