= Paul Cabet =

French sculptor

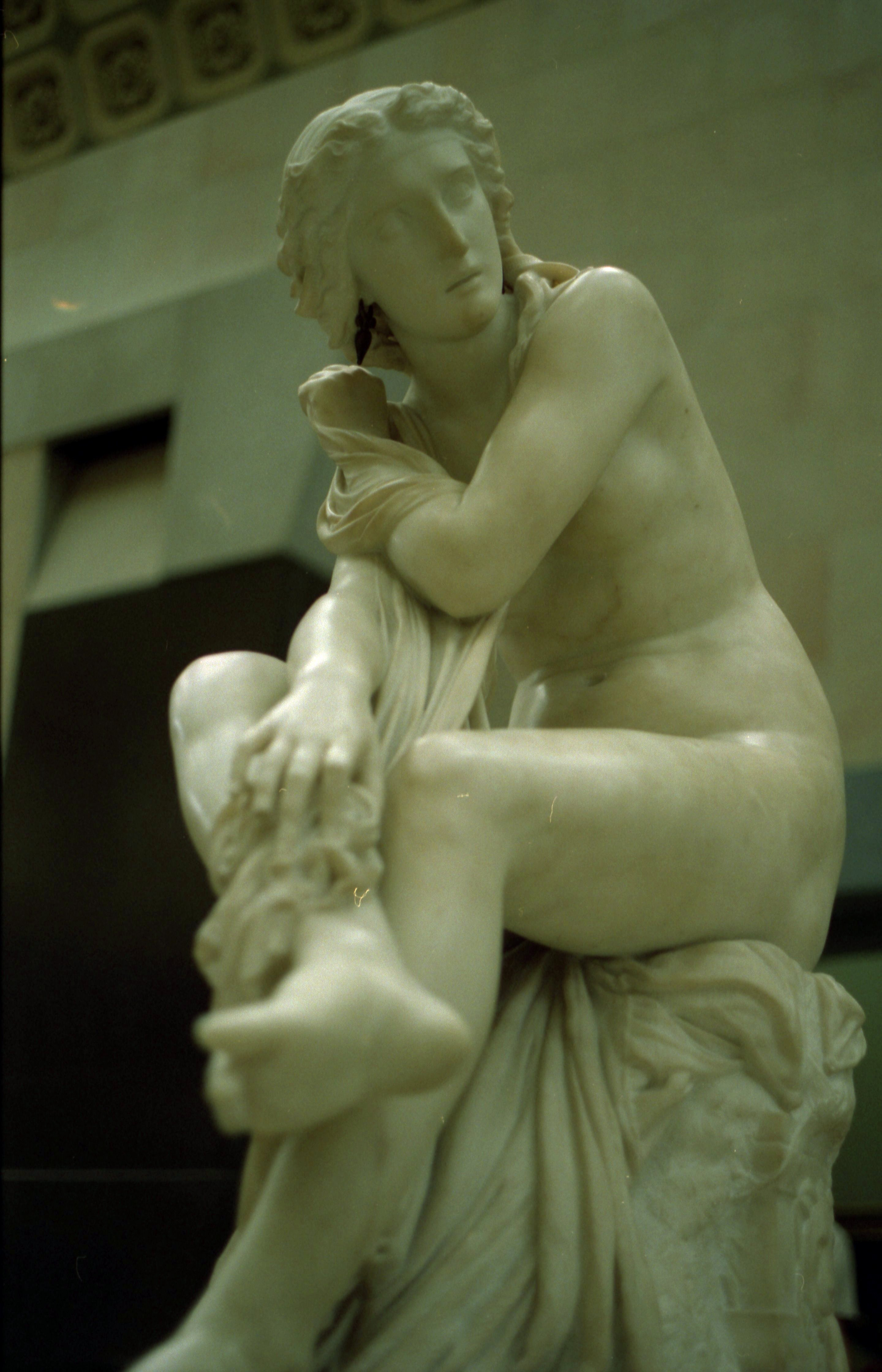
Suzanne, by Paul Cabet, 1861

Jean-Baptiste Paul Cabet (1 February 1815, Nuits, Yonne – 1876, Paris), was a French sculptor. He was the pupil of François Rude, his stepfather.

Having achieved his own fame, he was the author of the statue known under the name of Résistance as a witness to the heroic fightings in Dijon during the 1870 war, which generated significant controversy.

The Musée d'Orsay holds several of Cabet's sculptures in its collections, including Saint Martin partageant son manteau, Mil huit cent soixante et onze, Chant et Poésie, Désespoir, and Suzanne.
