= François Devosge =

French portraitist and history painter

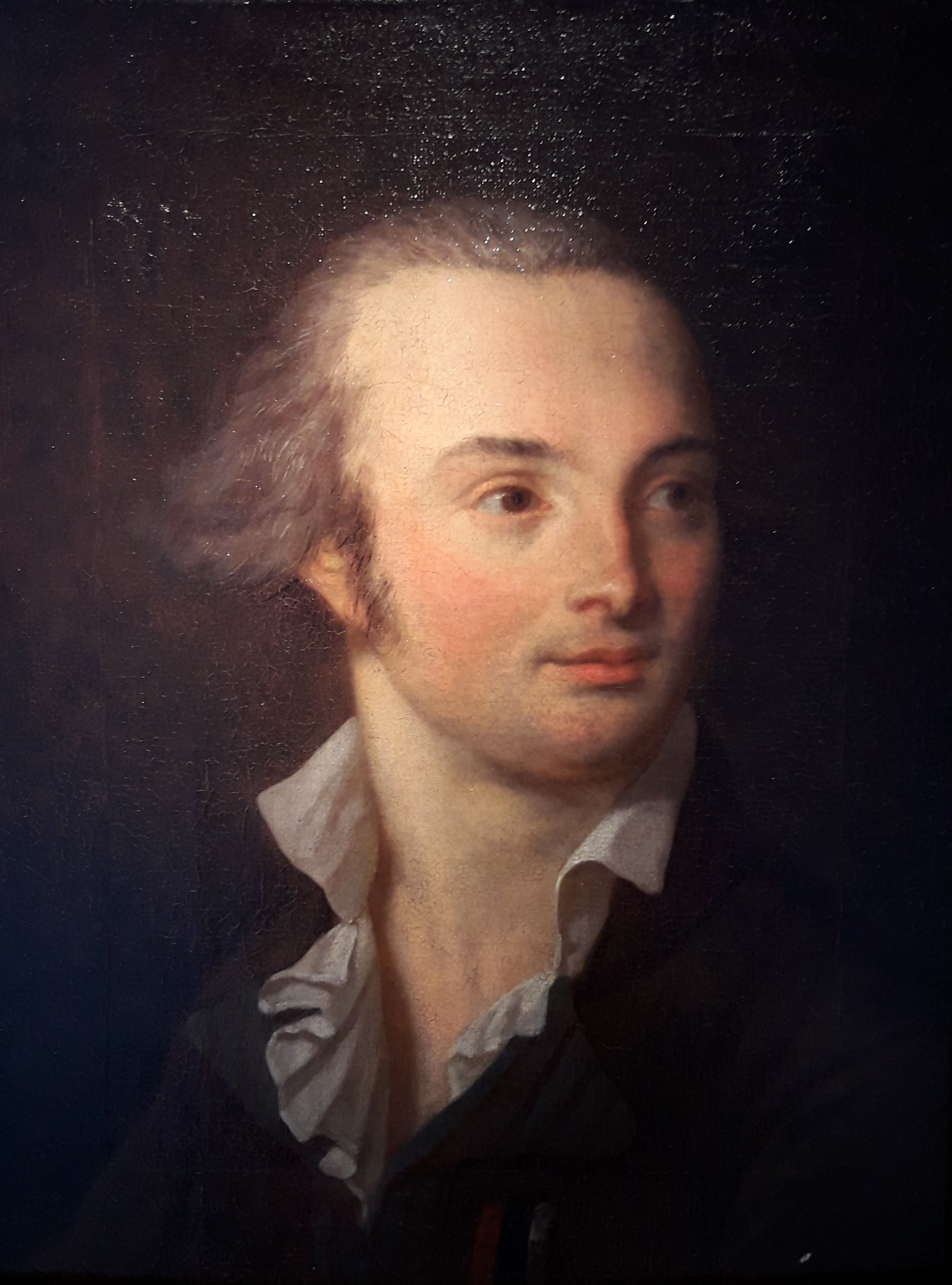
Portrait du sculpteur Gaulle by François Devosge

François Devosge, François III Devosge or Claude François III (25 January 1732 – 22 December 1811) was a French portraitist and history painter. He was born in Gray, Haute-Saône. Among his students were François Rude, Pierre-Paul Prud'hon and Claude Hoin. He is best known for his work as the founder of the École de Dessin de Dijon, and died in Dijon. His son Anatole Devosge (1770–1850) was also a painter, whilst his father Claude François Devosge (1697–1777) was a sculptor and architect.
