= Sophie Frémiet =

French painter (1797–1867)

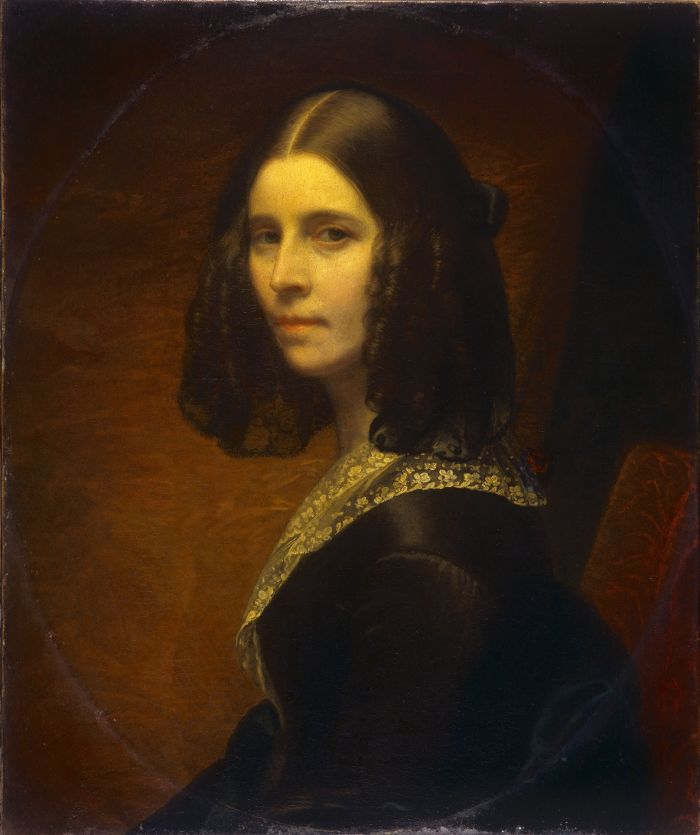
Self-portrait of Sophie Rude, née Frémiet, 1841

Sophie Rude (née Frémiet; 16 June 1797 – 4 December 1867) was a French painter.

== Biography ==
=== Youth and art training ===
Born in Dijon, her father was the assistant curator of the city's museum, a patron of artists and a fervent Bonapartist. Sophie was taught by Anatole Devosge, a former pupil of Jacques-Louis David. Her father supported the work of a young Dijon sculptor, François Rude.

In the aftermath of the second Bourbon Restoration in 1815, the Frémiet family, along with many other Bonapartists, left France for Brussels (now Belgium, then part of the newly created United Kingdom of the Netherlands). Here Sophie studied under another French exile, her former teacher's master, Jacques-Louis David. She worked as David's copyist and exhibited her own works in Brussels and in Antwerp. In 1820, her Belle Anthia was a great success at an exhibition in Ghent.

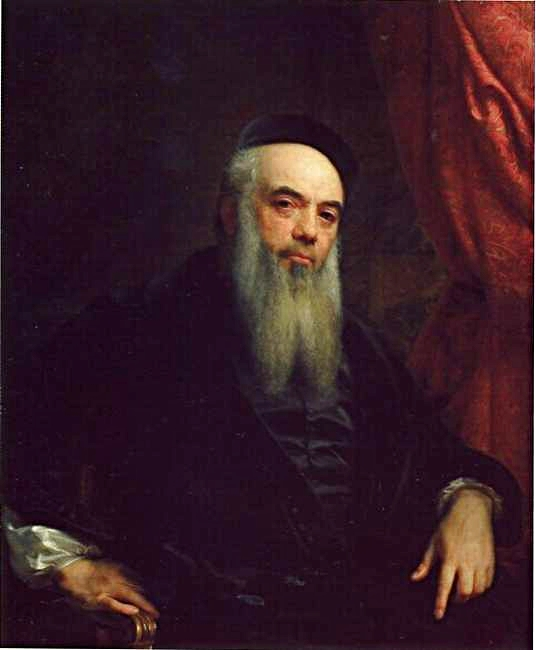
Sophie Frémiet, portrait of her husband, François Rude.

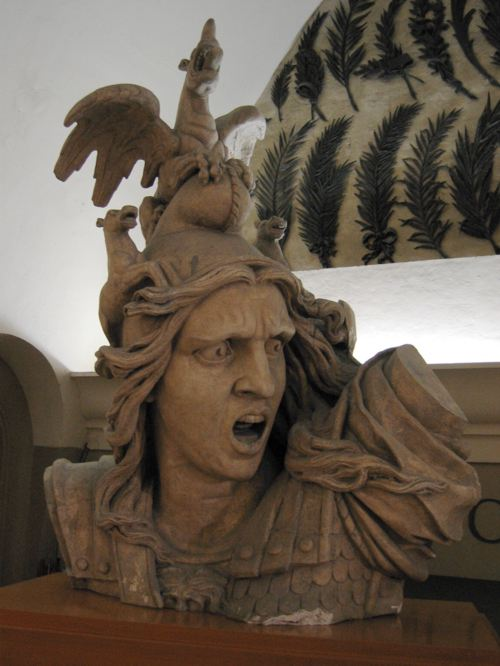
Sophie Frémiet served as the model for the figure of The Genius of War, in the Departure of the Volunteers created by her husband, François Rude, on the Arc de Triomphe.

=== Career ===
On 25 July 1821, Sophie married her father's former protégé François Rude. The couple would have only one child, Amédée, who died young in 1830 at the age of eight. In Brussels Sophie was a successful artist, receiving many commissions, including several for the former royal palace at Tervuren, lost in the fire that destroyed it. Her works were neoclassicist in style, largely mythological, although she produced a small number of religious paintings. Her portrayal of the nymph Pirene as mother in 1823 was awarded a gold medal at a show in 1824. It was sold at Sotheby's for USD 685,500 in 2022.

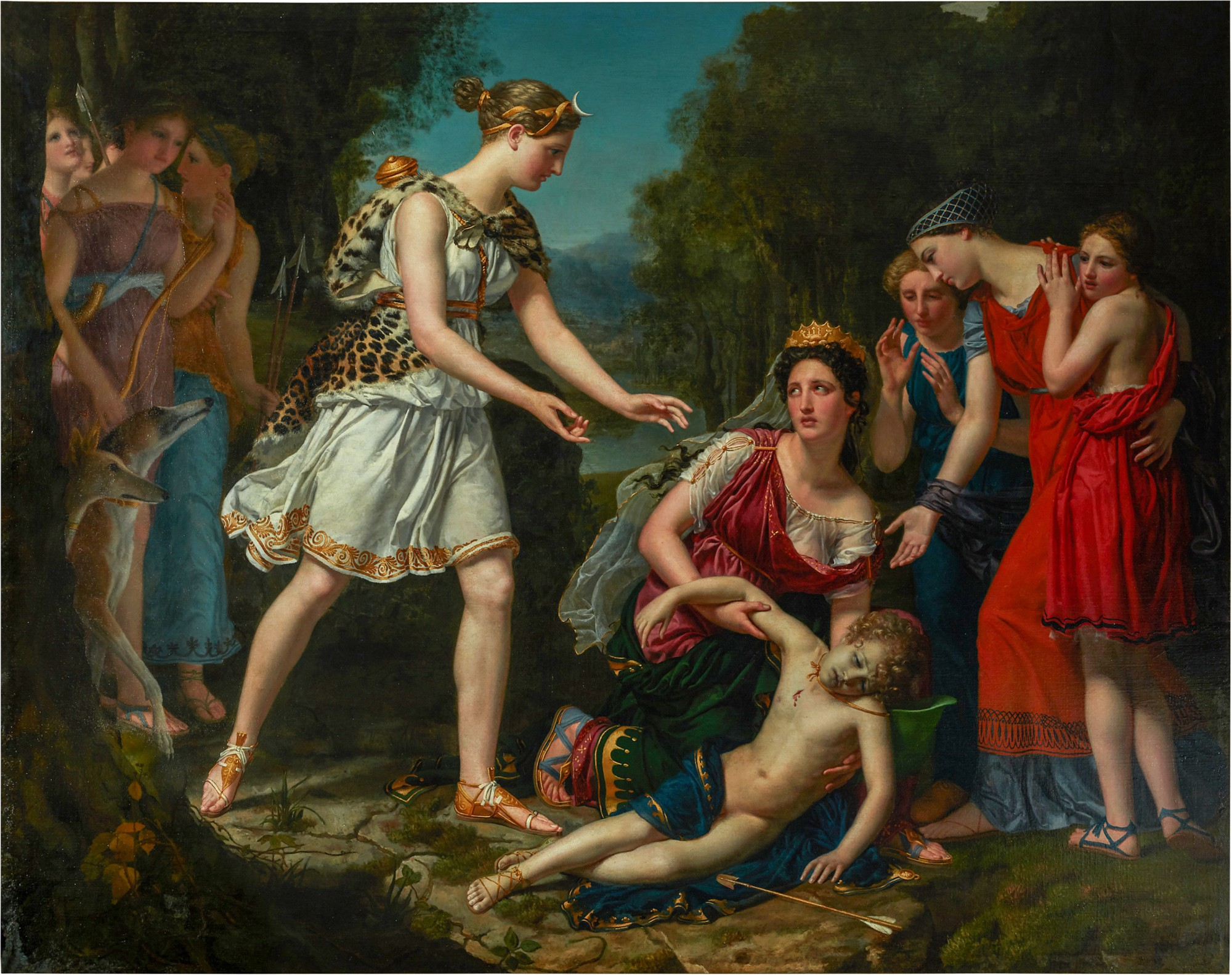
The death of Cenchirias, son of Neptune and the nymph Peirene, 1821–23

In 1826, the Rude family returned to France, settling in Paris. Here Sophie began to paint historical scenes. She served as the model for the female figure representing the Genius of War her husband's frieze The Departure of the Volunteers (also known as La Marseillaise), which forms part of the Arc de Triomphe. François Rude died in 1855, and Sophie devoted the rest of her life to exhibiting and publicising her husband's work.

She died in Paris.

== Gallery ==
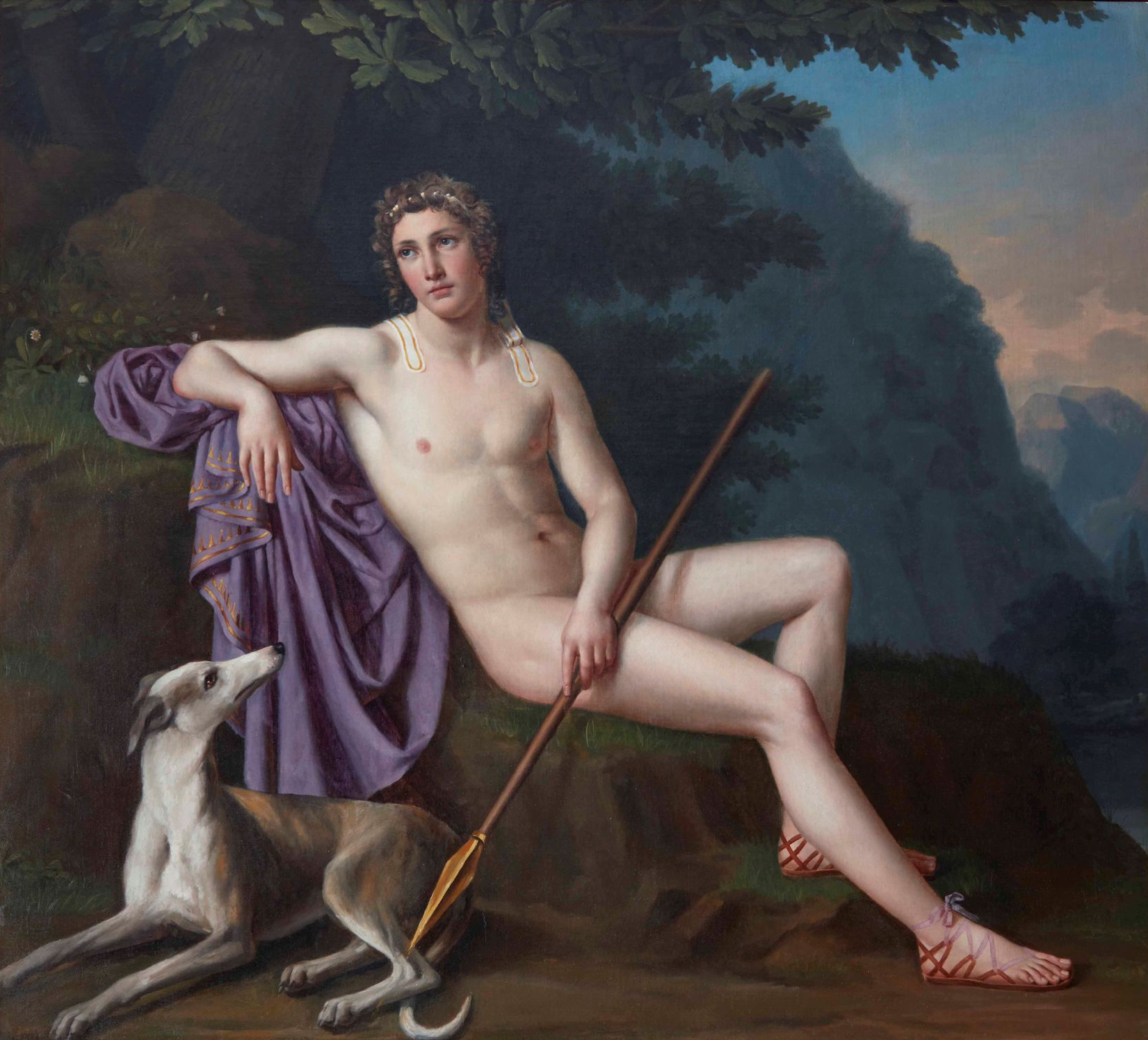
Adonis with a greyhound

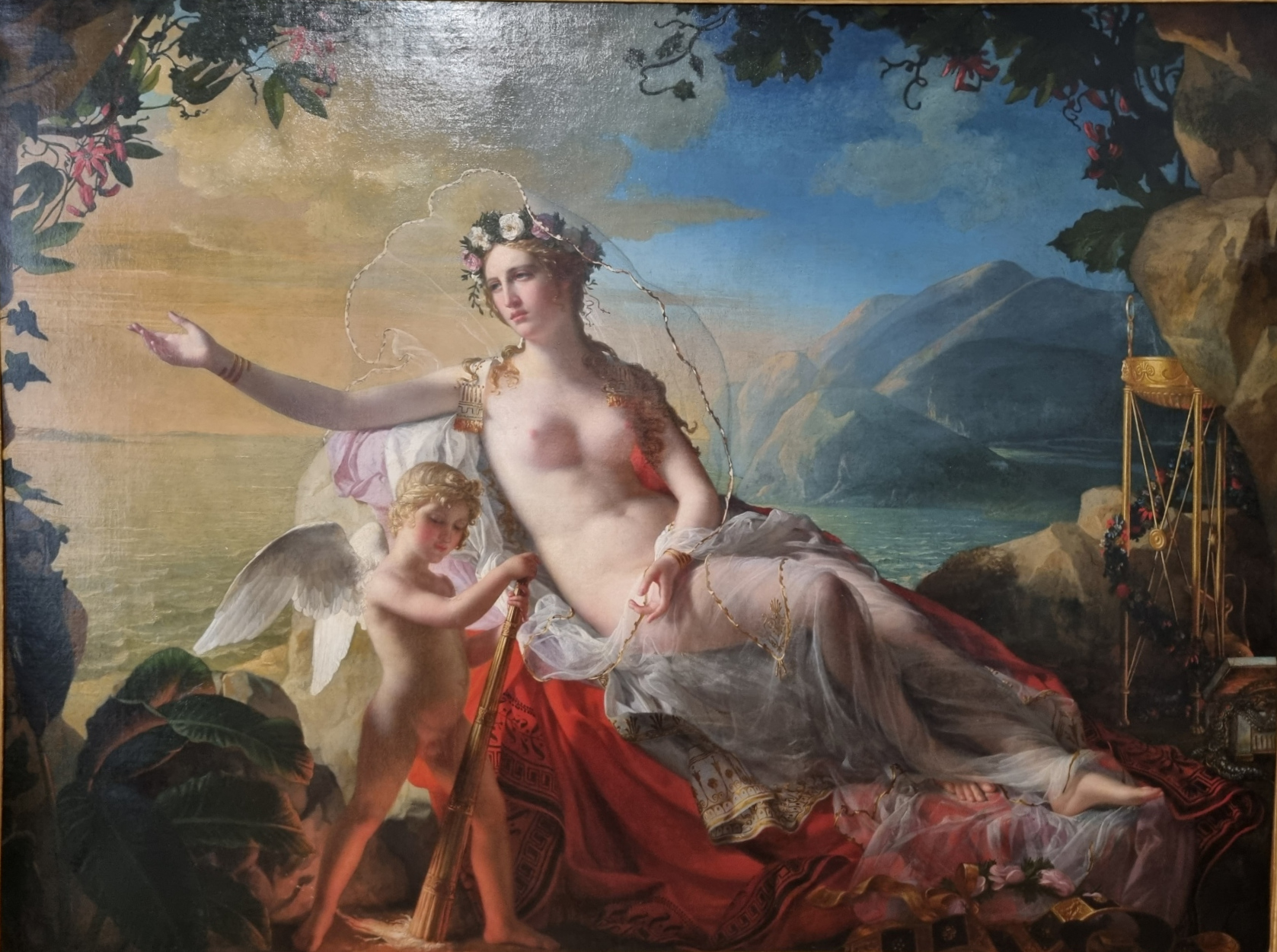
Ariadne abandoned on the island of Naxos, 1826

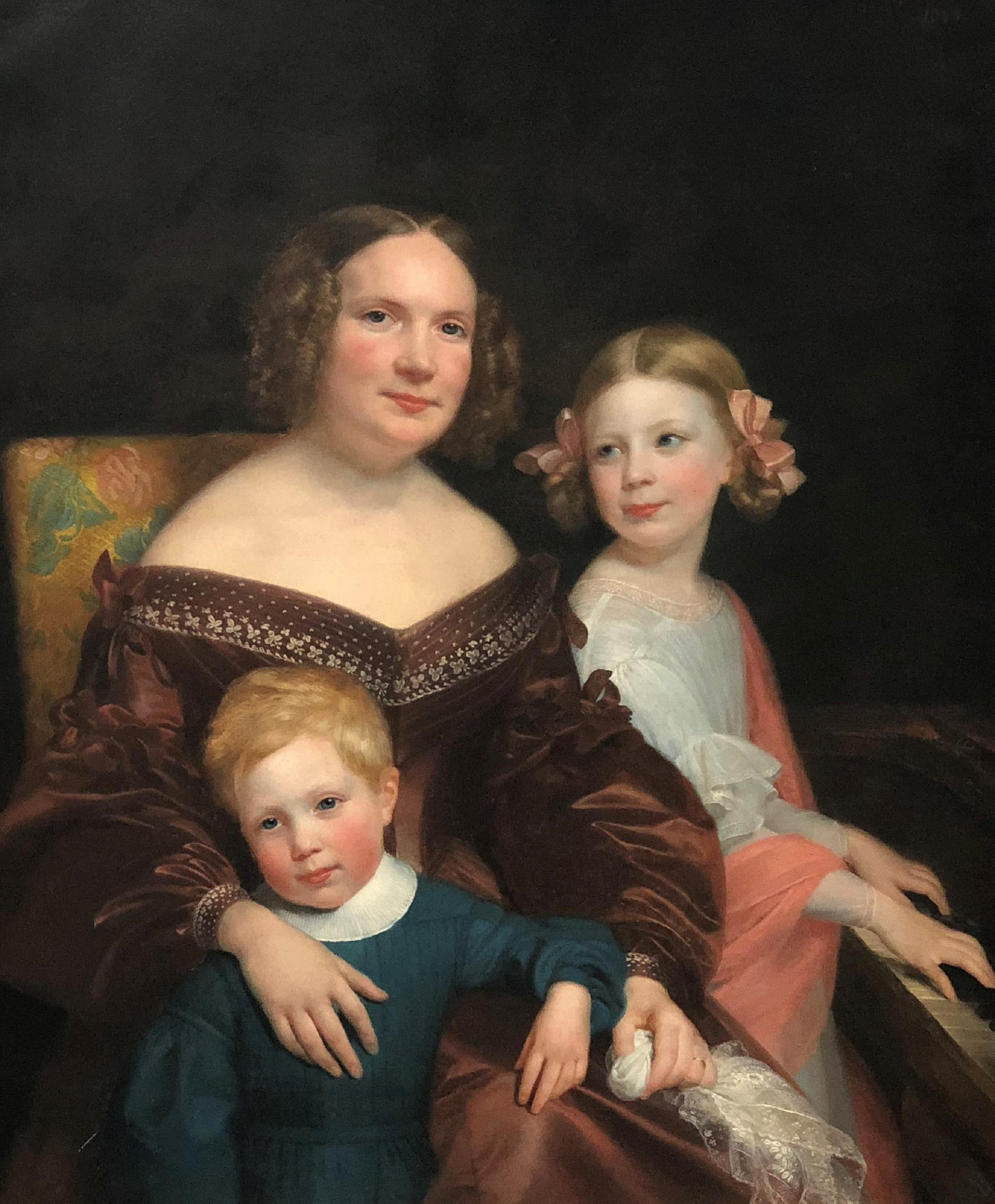
Portrait of a Mother and Two Children, 1840

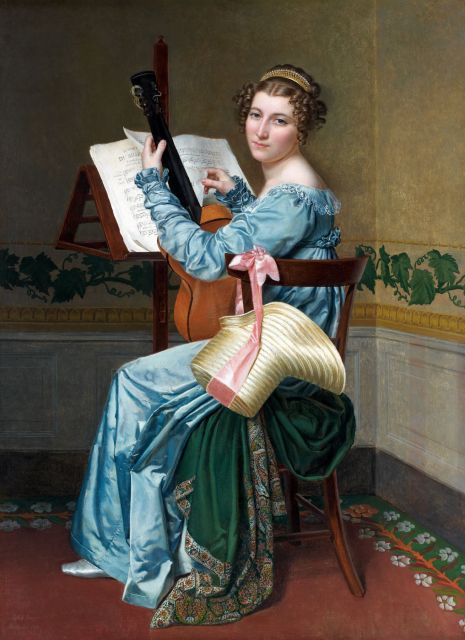
Portrait of Victorine Frémiet, painted by her sister Sophie Frémiet in Brussels, 1818

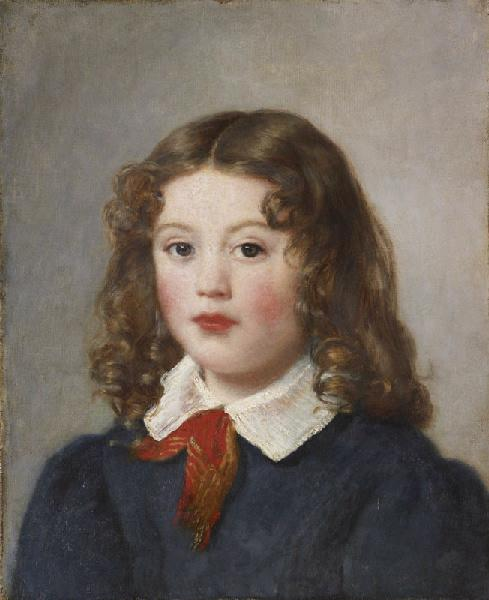
Portrait of Amédée Rude the painter's son, 1830

== Sources ==
- Geiger, Monique, "Frémiet, Sophie" in E. Gubin, C. Jacques, V. Piette & J. Puissant (eds), Dictionnaire des femmes belges: XIX^{e} et XX^{e} siècles. Bruxelles: Éditions Racine, 2006. ISBN 2-87386-434-6
