= Anatole Devosge =

French painter (1770–1850)

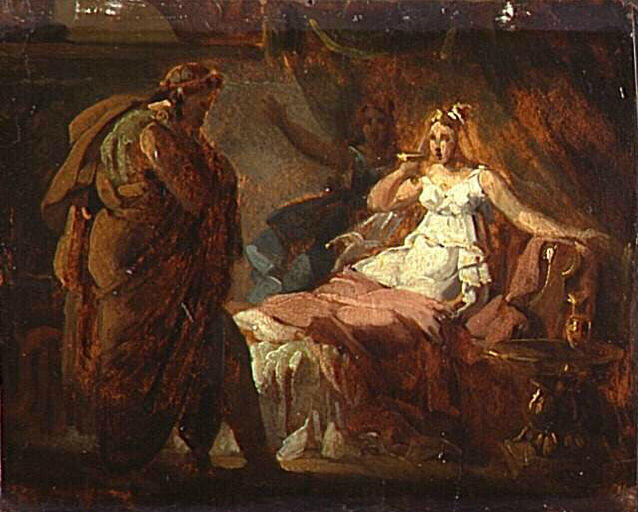
La Mort de Sophonisbe, work attributed to Anatole Devosge.

Anatole Devosge (13 January 1770 – 8 December 1850) was a French painter.

== Life ==
Born in Dijon, he was the son of painter François Devosge and grandson of sculptor Claude François Devosge. He was one of the many artists trained in the studio of Jacques-Louis David. David's work Les derniers moments de Michel Lepeletier survives only in a sketch by Devosge. The sketch formed the basis of Tardieu's engraving, distributed by the government to all 84 departments of France as part of the propaganda campaign following the death of Lepeletier and Jean-Paul Marat.

His own pupils included Sophie Fremiet. Many of Devosge's works are held by the Museum of Fine Arts in Dijon. He was for many years a teacher at the Dijon School of Drawing, and his estate included many works by pupils of the school.

Devosge's work, like that of his master David, was not popular with later audiences. A character in Joris-Karl Huysmans The Oblate (1924) comments "Oh, what an absolute ass was this Devosge, what a priceless old woman!".
