= François Rude =

French sculptor (1784–1855)

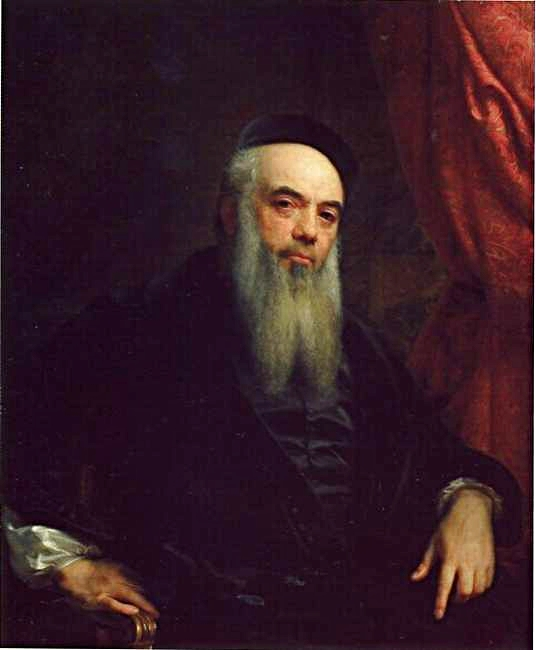
- Portrait by Sophie Rude (1842)
- Born: 4 January 1784; Dijon, France
- Died: 3 November 1855 (aged 71); Paris, France
- Known for: Sculpture, drawing
- Awards: Legion of Honour

François Rude (French pronunciation: [fʁɑ̃swa ʁyd]; 4 January 1784 – 3 November 1855) was a French sculptor, best known for the Departure of the Volunteers, also known as La Marseillaise on the Arc de Triomphe in Paris. (1835–36). His work often expressed patriotic themes, as well as the transition from neo-classicism to romanticism.

== Early life ==
François Rude was born 4 January 1784 on rue Petite-Poissonnerie (rue François Rude) in Dijon. His father was a blacksmith and locksmith, who taught Rude the trade of forging iron, so he could take over the family business. In 1799, at the age of fifteen, despite his father's resistance, he began taking courses at the School of Fine Arts in Dijon, located within the Palace of the Dukes of Burgundy, while continuing to work in the family business. His teacher was the deputy curator of the Dijon museum, Louis Fremiet. Rude learned both drawing and sculpture, using classical models. Fremiet helped protect Rude from being drafted into Napoleon's army, and, in 1808, sent him to Paris to continue his studies.

Rude began his studies at the Imperial Ecole des Beaux-Arts in Paris in August 1808 under Pierre Cartellier, a devotee of classical sculpture. His fellow students included several sculptors who later became prominent, including David d'Angers, James Pradier and the celebrated animalist Antoine-Louis Barye. While studying, he gained practical experience as an assistant to Edme Gaulle, who was making part of the sculptural frieze of the column being made for Place Vendôme to celebrate the victories of Napoleon. In 1809 he competed in the academy's prestigious annual competition, and took second place with the purely classical Marius meditating upon the ruins of Carthage. In 1812, he won two competitions, one for the most expressive bust, with a work called attention combined with fear; and a second, Aristotle deploring the loss of his bees.. The latter work won the Grand Prize of the academy, Prix de Rome, and the opportunity to study at the French Academy in Rome. Unfortunately for Rude, the academy in Rome was having financial difficulties, and the departure of the winners was postponed. He was preparing again to depart for Rome in early 1815 when Napoleon returned from his exile in Elba and the war began again. After Napoleon's final defeat at Waterloo and the second restoration of the French monarchy, Rude decided to go into self-imposed exile in Brussels. At the request of his teacher from Dijon, Louis Fremiet, he agreed to take with him to Brussels and look after Fremiet's mother-in-law, aunt, and two daughters, including Sophie, who in 1821 became Rude's wife.

== Exile in Brussels ==
Rude lived in Brussels from 1817 until 1826. where he found many other self-imposed exiles, the most famous of whom was the painter Jacques-Louis David. Rude's wife, a painter, became David's pupil and then his copyist. In Brussels he made a bust of David, neoclassical in style, but realistically portraying the deformation of David's mouth caused by a nervous malady.

In Brussels he received his first major commission; he was asked by the Belgian royal architect Charles Vander Straeten to design decorative relief sculptures for the hunting lodge of the Belgian crown prince at Tervuren. The work was a frieze around the rotunda of the Hall of Honor. Among the other artists selected to work on the frieze was Sophie Fremiet, also a painter, who became Rude's wife. The friezes by Rude represented a classical hunting scene, The Hunt of Meleager for the entry portico and a series of eight reliefs for the rotunda, illustrating the life of Achilles. The work required representing dozens of figures, both in action scenes and scenes of pathos and drama. Rude based his work on the models of classical sculpture, but gave them exceptional naturalism and dynamism. The original work was destroyed by a fire in the lodge in 1879, but plaster copies made from the original moldings and illustrations survive.

== Return to Paris – classicism to romanticism ==
Brussels did not offer enough opportunities or challenges, and in 1827 Rude returned to Paris with Sophie and entered a work in the Paris Salon of 1827. The work was shown only a short time before the Salon closed, and it attracted little attention, but it illustrated the evolution of his style. The statue, Mercury fastening his sandals after slaying Argus (now in the Louvre) was neoclassical in theme, but showed a striking energy and realism.

Rude decided to move permanently to Paris in 1828. He found a client in the French state, which commissioned him, along with several others sculptors, to work on a frieze for the Arc de Triomphe; he refined his technique and style. In 1833 he presented a new work, A young Neopolitan fisherman playing with tortoise a fusion of classicism and romanticism, vividly expressing emotion. This work won a cross of the Legion of Honor, sculpture.

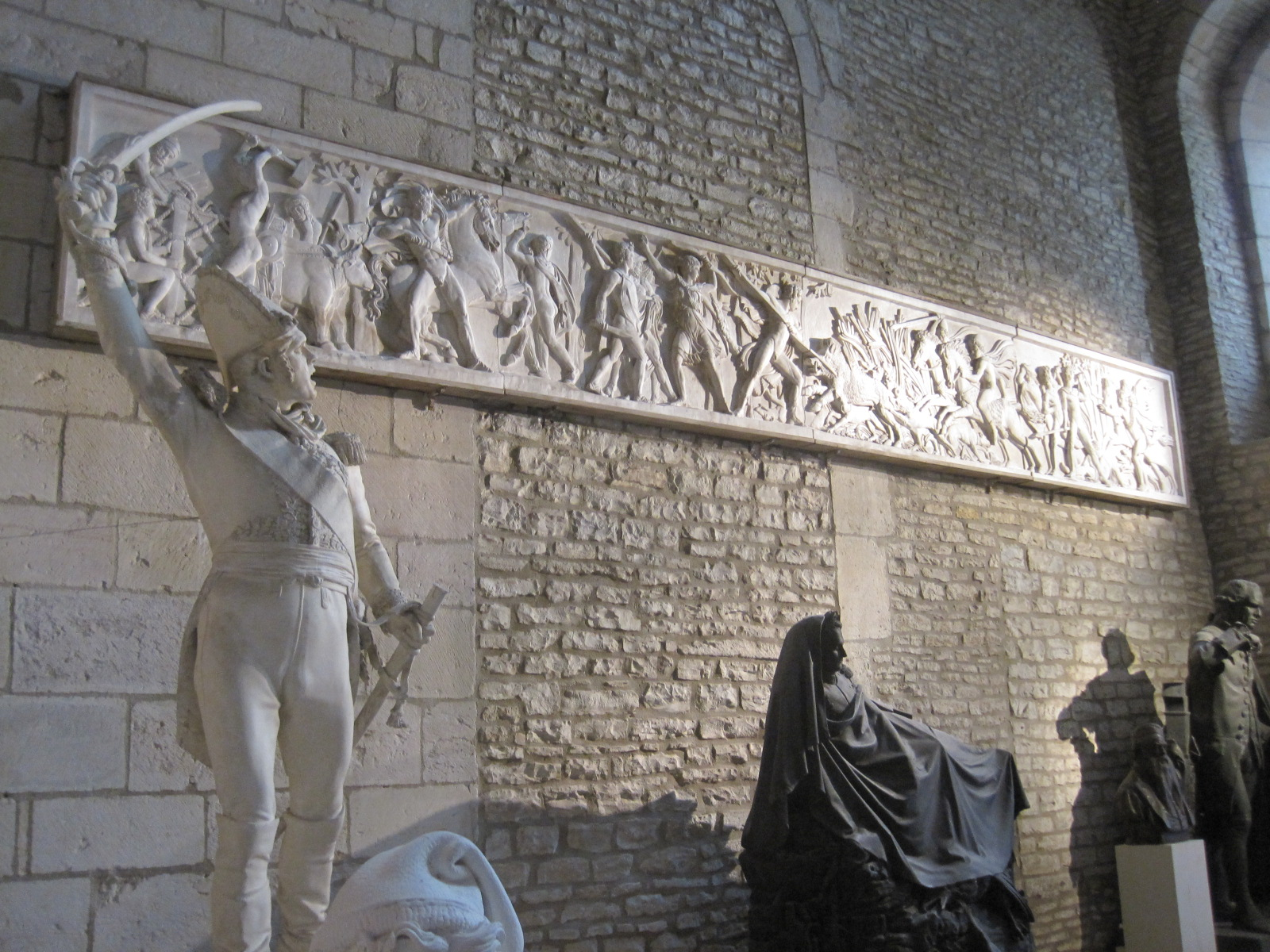
A plaster molding of The Hunt of Meleager 1821–23, Rude Museum, Dijon

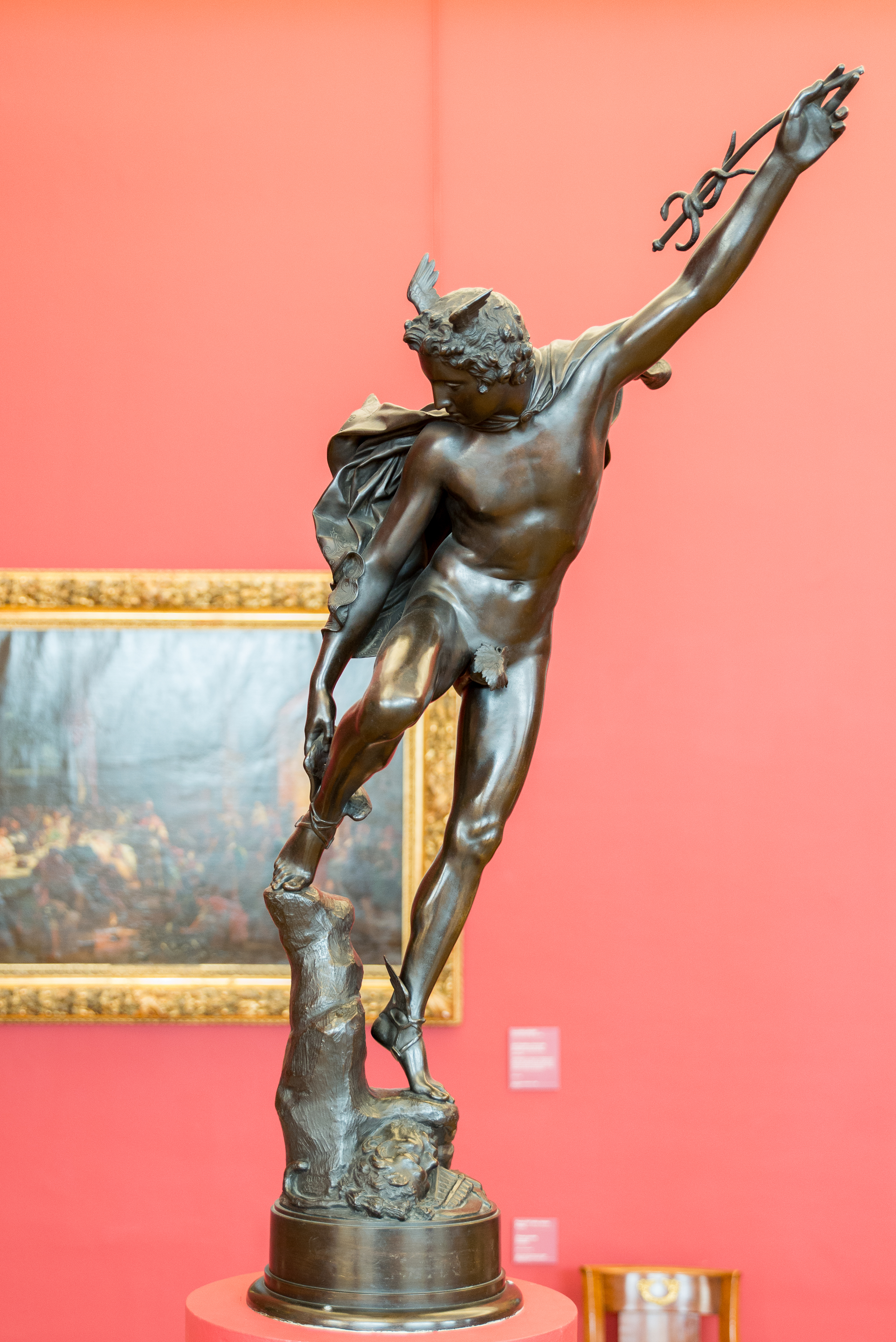
Mercury Fastening his Sandals After Killing Argos, 1827, The Louvre

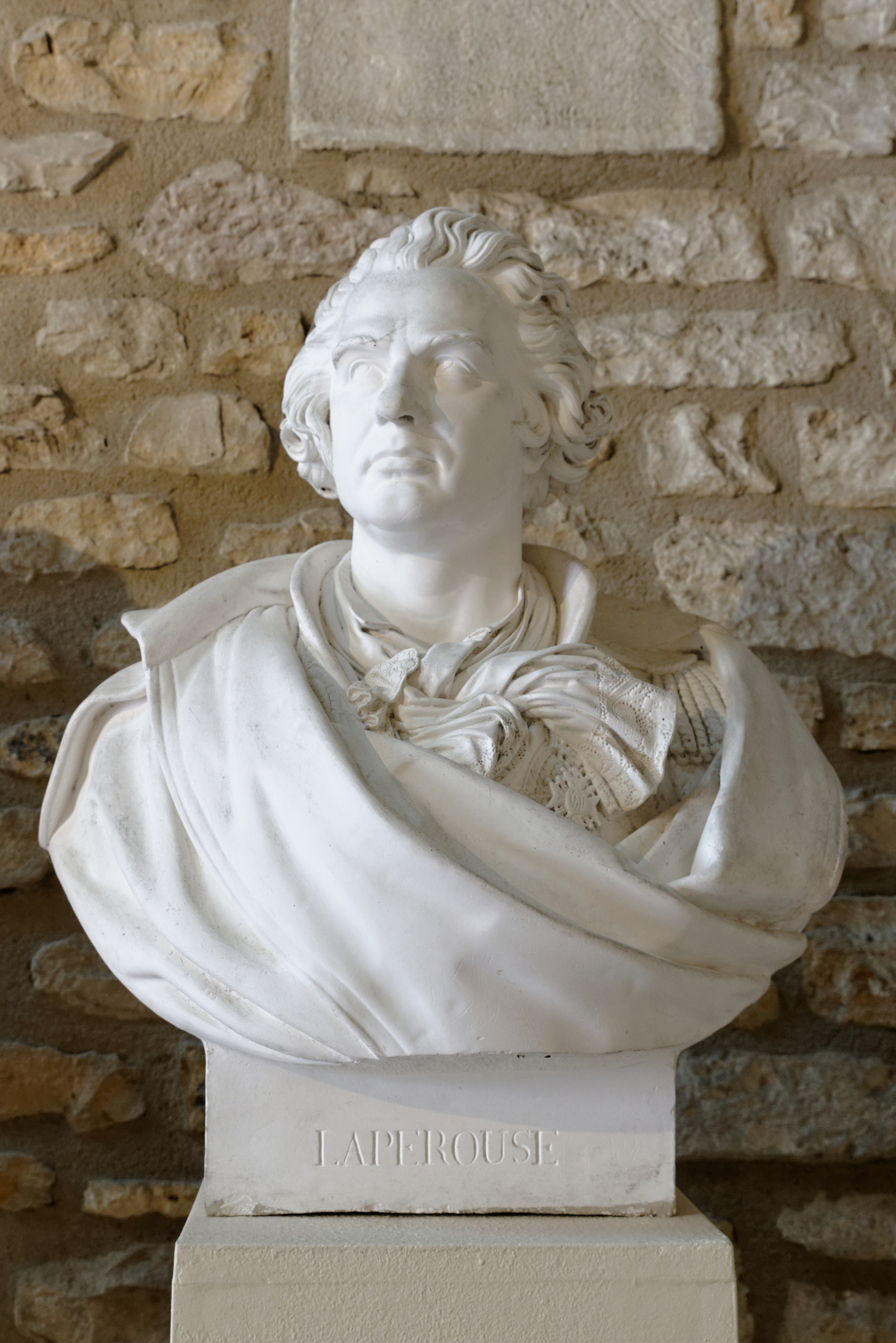
Bust of La Pérouse, 1828

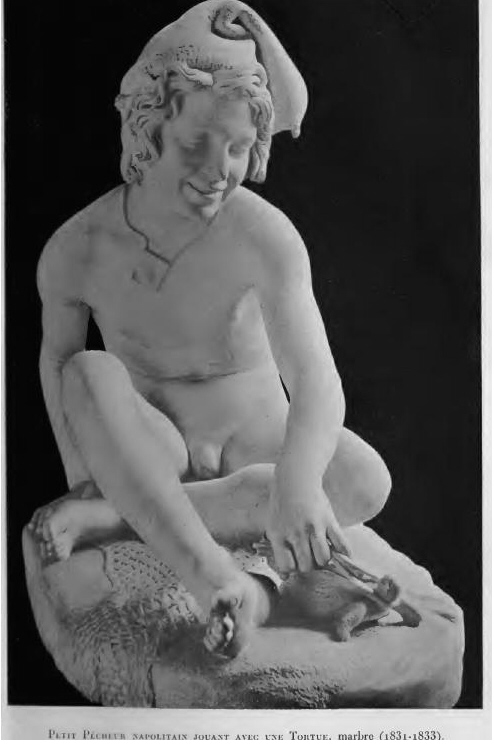
Neapolitan Fisher Boy Playing with a Tortoise, 1831–33, The Louvre

== The Arc de Triomphe and Départ des Volontaires de 1792 ==
The Arc de Triomphe had been begun in 1806 by Napoleon to celebrate his victory at the battle of Austerlitz. It had only reached a height of nine meters when Napoleon was overthrown, and it was abandoned for years. During the Bourbon Restoration, Charles X of France had begun to work on it again, to make it a monument to celebrate the defeat of Spanish revolutionaries by a French royal expeditionary force. When Rude first arrived in Paris in 1828, based on his experience with the friezes in Tervuren, he became one of the sculptors working on the friezes, depicting the exploits of the royalist army in Spain.

The July Revolution of 1830 overthrew the royal government of the Charles X and put Louis Philippe on the throne. The new government decided to complete the construction of the Arc de Triomphe on a very different theme. Rude's work at the Salon of 1833 had come to the attention of Adolphe Thiers, the new Minister of the Interior, who had taken office in 1832. Thiers was an art collector, and was familiar with Rude's work at the 1828 salon. The royalist architect of the Arch was replaced, and Thiers put a new architect, Guillaume-Abel Blouet, who had political opinions closer to those of Rude, in charge of the project, with Rude to assist him. Rude was given the commission to make portions of the frieze depicting the departure of volunteers from Paris in 1792 to fight against the anti-revolutionary armies, as well as a frieze commemorating the triumphal returns to France of Napoleon's expeditions to Egypt and Italy.

The Départ des volontaires de 1792 (Departure of the Volunteers of 1792), also known as La Marseillaise completed in 1836, became Rude's most famous work. It depicted the departure of a French revolutionary army to fight against a coalition of royalist forces at the Battle of Valmy in 1792. Sophie Fremiet, Rude's wife, posed for the principal figure, the Génie de la Guerre (Genius of the War), a woman with a sword shouting to urge others on to battle. The pose of this figure resembled the central figure of the painting by Delacroix, Liberty leading the People, which had been purchased by the French government at the 1831 Salon, and shown briefly at the Luxembourg Museum until 1833. The fierce shouting expression had been used earlier by Rude as a student at the academy, in the competition for best facial expressions, which he won in 1812. The soldiers wore the costumes of warriors of ancient Gaul. The Depart des Volontaires de 1792 immediately became famous for its vitality and energy, and as a celebration of the French revolutionary spirit. Auguste Rodin took up the same theme, with a similar shouting figure, in his La Defense (1879).

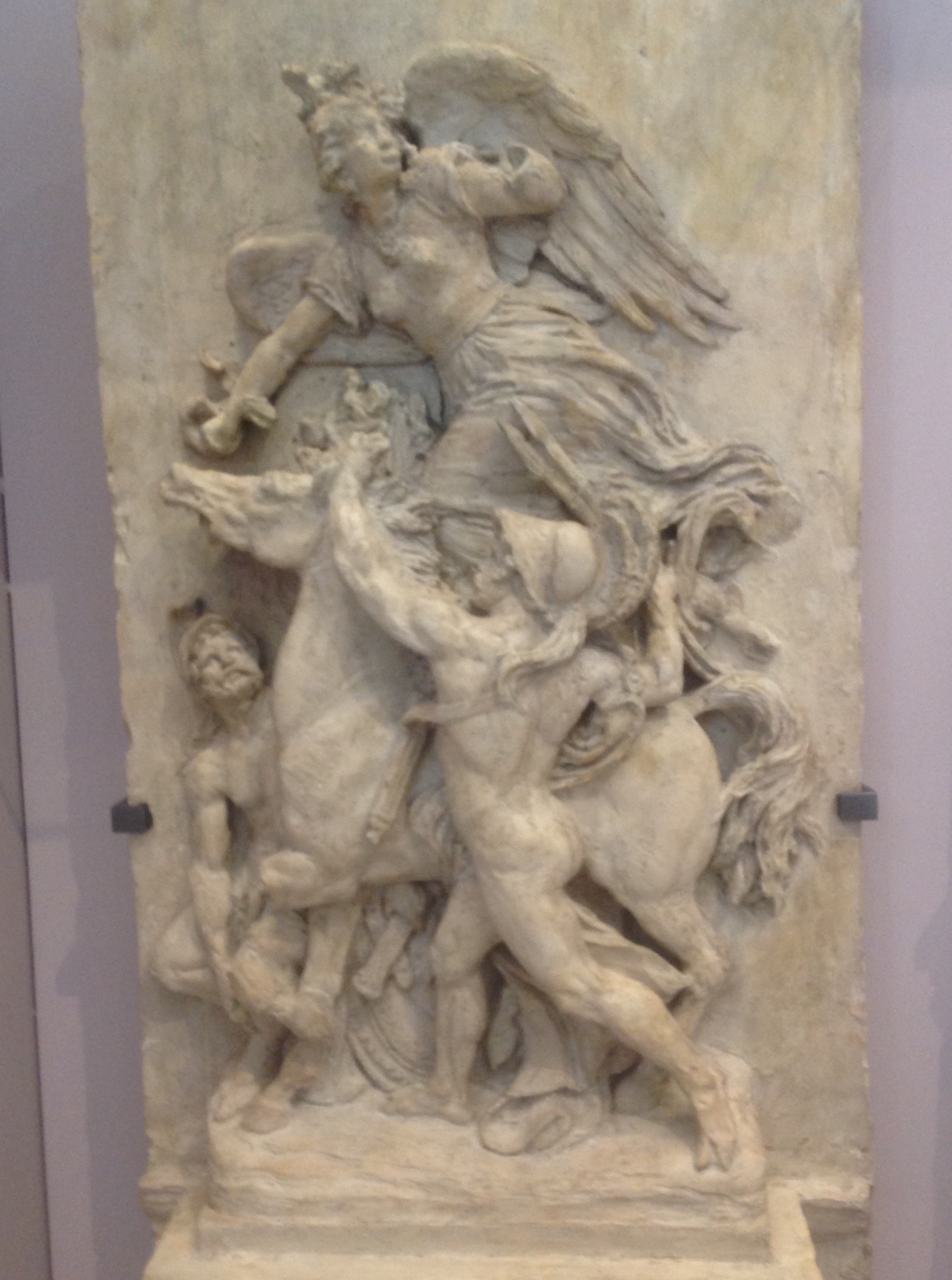
Model of second version of Le Depart des Volontaires de 1792, in plaster, 1833, The Louvre

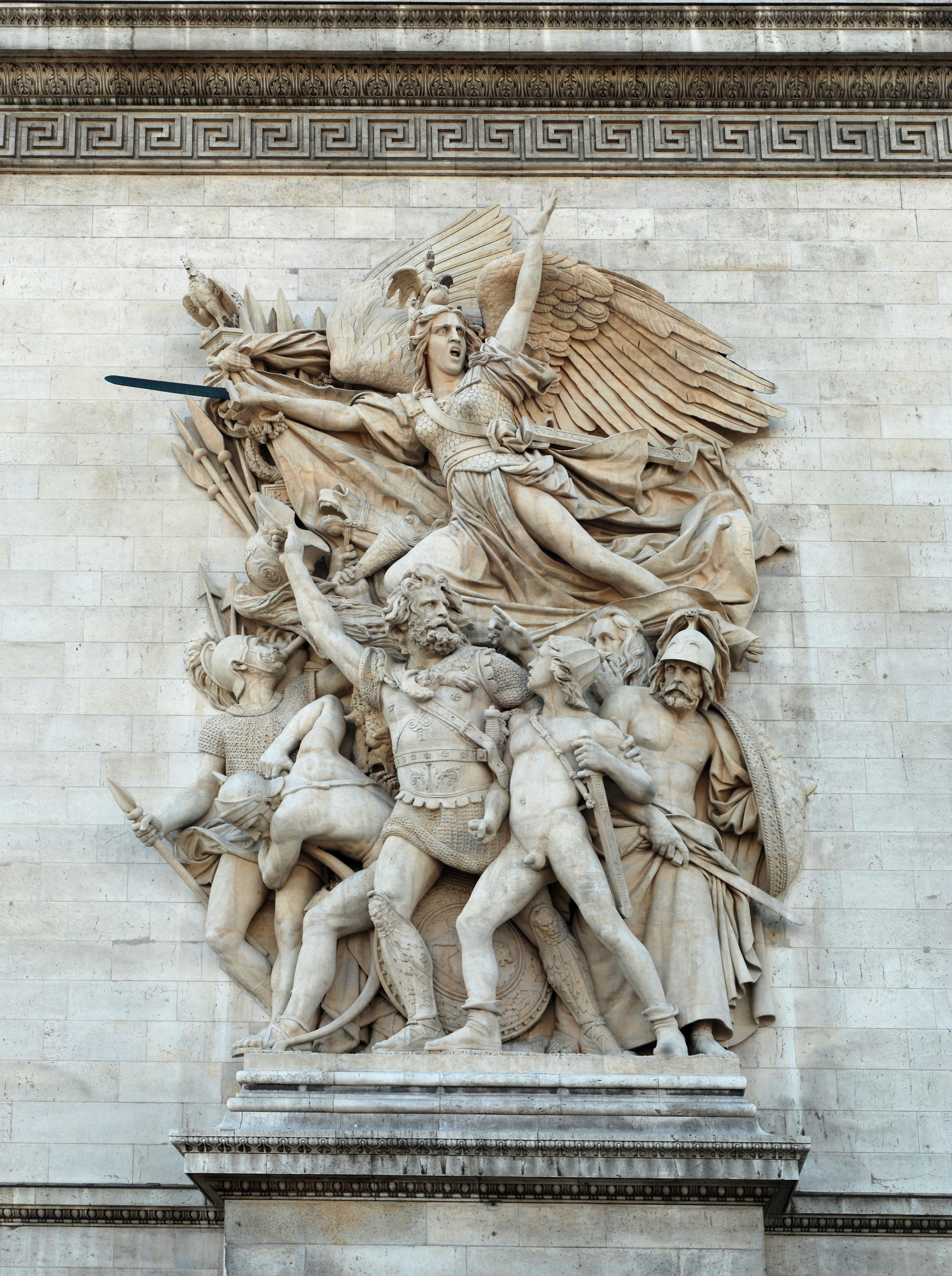
The Départ des Volontaires, 1836

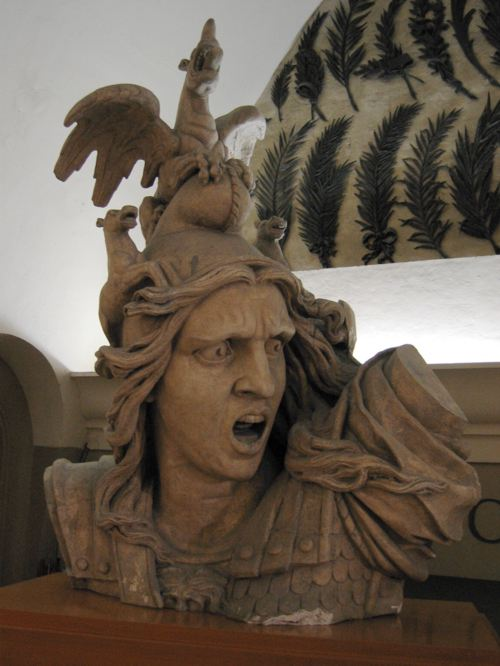
Head of the Génie de la Guerre

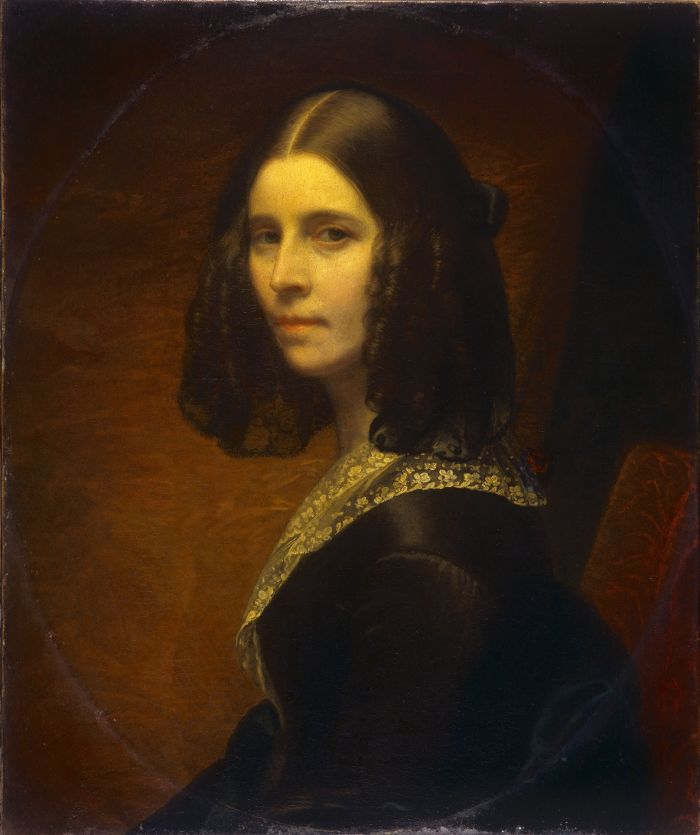
Rude's wife Sophie Frémiet, a painter, posed for the Génie de la Guerre

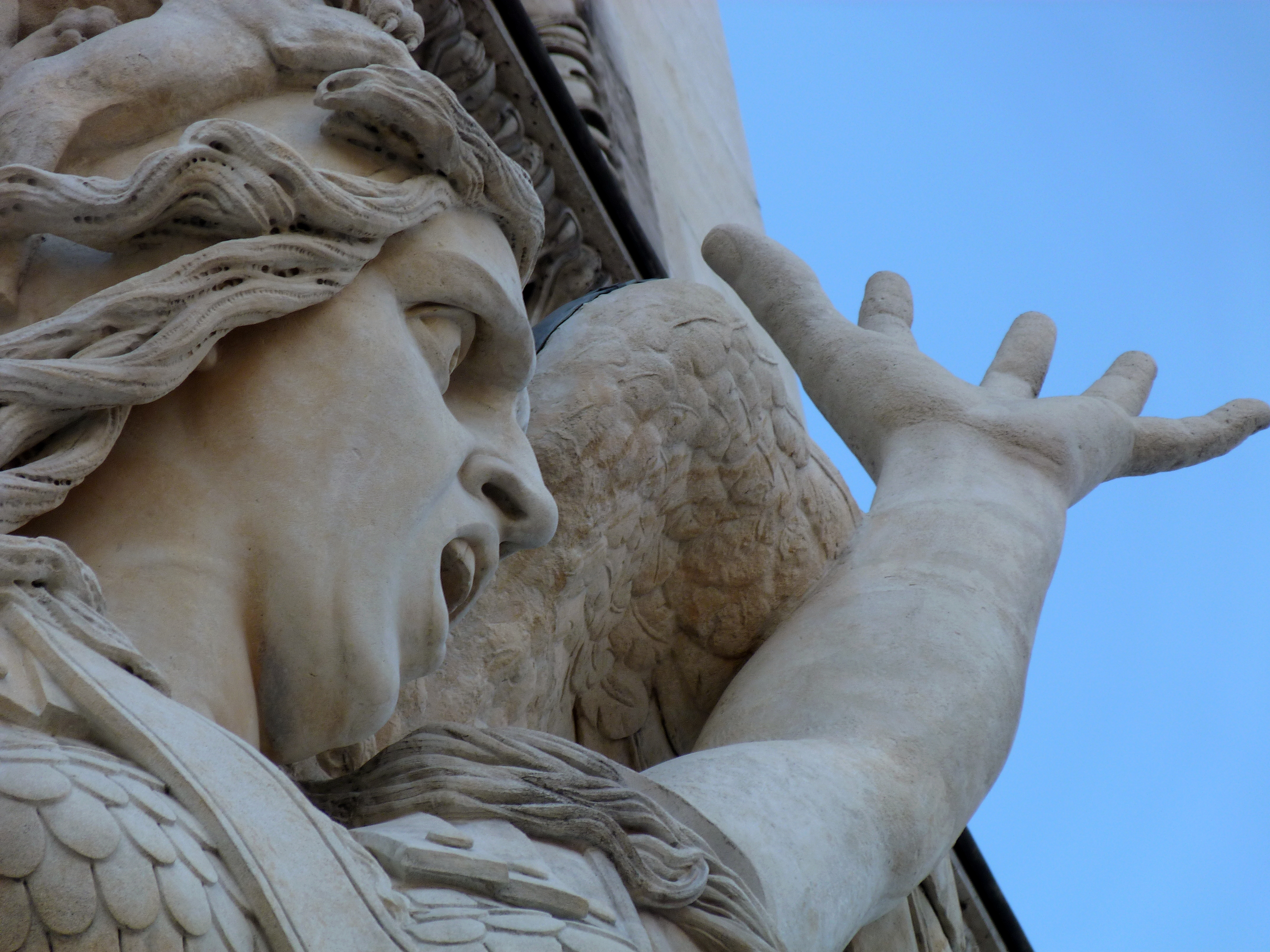
The head of the Génie de la Guerre

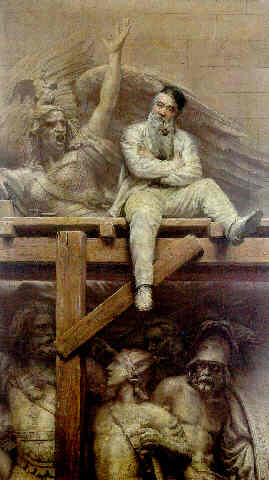
François Rude working on the Arc de Triomphe, painting by Joseph-Noël Sylvestre, 1893

== Patriotic and historical statuary ==
The critical and popular acclaim for the frieze on the Arc de Triomphe led to more commissions for Rude. King Louis-Philippe encouraged patriotic monuments, to bridge the deep political divide between monarchists and republicans. In 1832, Louis-Philippe commissioned Rude to make a statue of the Roman statesman Cato the Elder. In 1837, Louis-Philppe opened a museum within the largely-abandoned Palace of Versailles to honor the heroes of French history, and, as he declared, "all the glories of France." Rude was commissioned in 1836, before the opening of the museum, to make a statue of a German-born French military hero from the 18th century, the Maurice de Saxe. This statue followed the traditions of heroic sculpture, presenting him a triumphal pose, holding his marshal's baton. He also had patrons in the nobility; in 1843, he created a statue in silver of the adolescent Louis XIII, for the Duc de Luynes, whose family had been ennobled by Lous XIII. It was later recast in bronze. In 1845, Rude completed another statue devoted to French history; Joan of Arc, portrayed with her hand up, listing to the mystical voice calling her to fight for the liberty of France against the English invaders. Her hair has already been cut to prepare her for battle, and her armor is by her side.

Louis-Philippe was driven into exile in 1848, and the new and brief Second French Republic came to power. It commissioned Rude to make an heroic statue of Michel Ney, one of Napoleon's most famous marshals, who had been shot for treason by the restored royalist government which replaced Napoleon. The earliest wax model made by Rude depicted Ney at his execution, as he opened his coat and urged the firing squad to "aim for the heart." This pose was judged as too politically provocative, so Rude made a different version, depicting Ney, sword upraised, ordering his soldiers forward. This work, like his earlier Departure of the Volunteers, broke with academic tradition by showing Ney with his mouth open, shouting at his soldiers to follow. This work was completed in 1853, after the fall of the Second Republic and the rise of Napoleon III. It is found in the square in front of the Paris Observatory.

An unusual work in his period of patriotic sculptures was his tomb of Éléonore-Louis Godefroi Cavaignac, one of the leaders of the republican opposition to the monarchy, who had died in 1845. The sepulcher designed by Rude recalled those of the Middle Ages made for the Kings of France, particularly the tomb of Henry II of France sculpted by Germain Pilon. The figure of Cavaignac was depicted with great realism; the body was depicted under a plain sheet, and body was emaciated from his imprisonment by royal government. The sepulcher served a model for those of later opponents of the monarchy.

Another notable example of his patriotic work was Napoleon Awakening to Immortality (1845). The statue was made for Claude Noisot, who a former captain in Napoleon's imperial guard and an officer of the Legion of Honor, who had accompanied Napoleon into exile on Elba, and at the Battle of Waterloo. He was unable to pursue a military career after Napoleon's downfall, but with the help of a wealthy wife purchased vineyards and an estate at Fixin in Burgundy. At the time that the statue was conceived, the political climate in Paris was still hostile to Napoleon, and there were no monuments to him in the city. Therefore, Noisot and Rude planned for the sculpture of the Emperor to be placed on Noisot's estate in Burgundy. The statue shows the Emperor, eyes closed, wearing a crown of laurel, under a military cloak, atop a rocky pedestal. An eagle, his symbol, is chained to the stone, and is crying out to awaken him, while the chains that held the Emperor have been broken. For years, elderly veterans of Napoleon's army made pilgrimages to Fixin to honor Rude's statue.

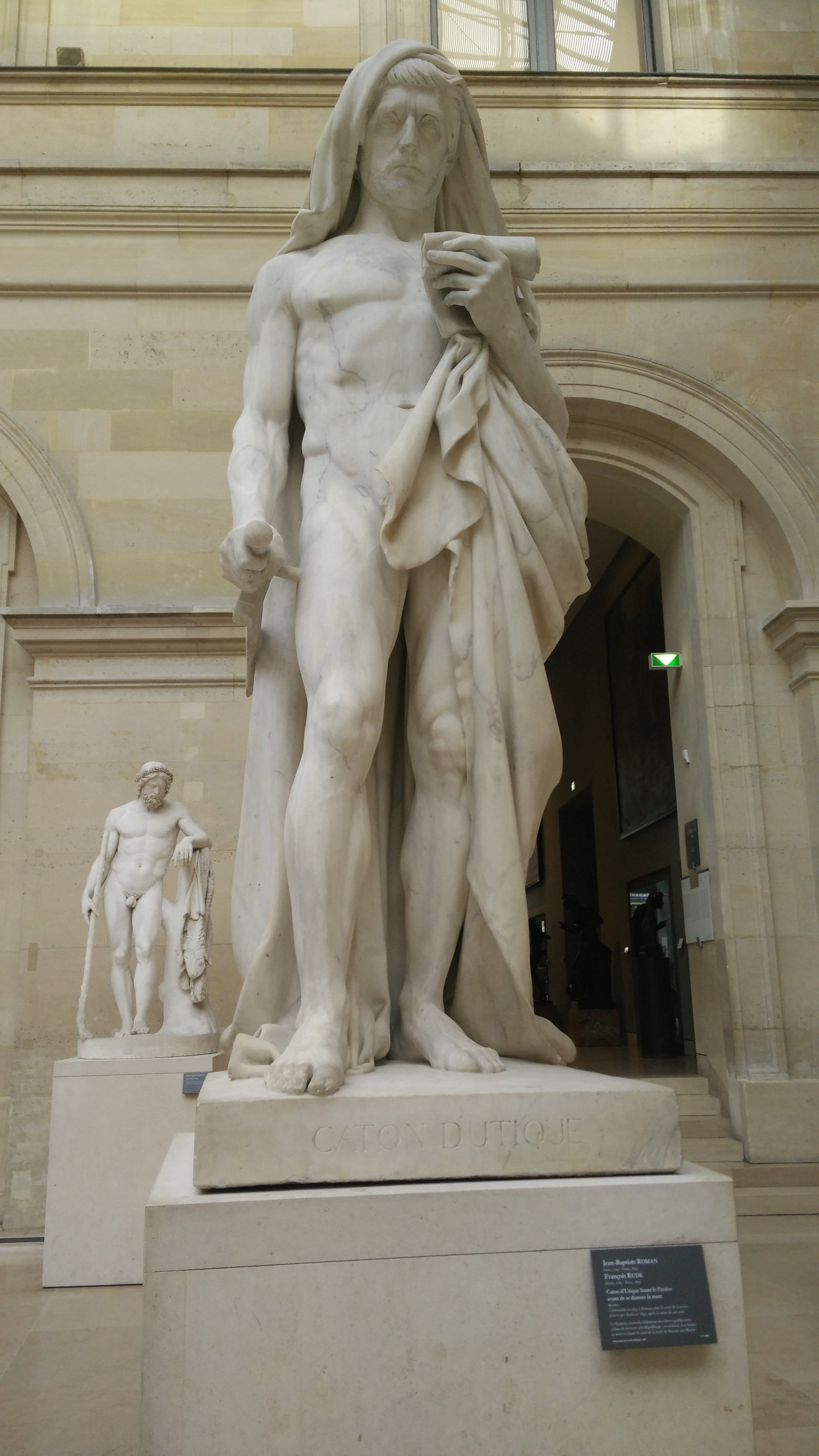
Marcus Porcius Cato, commissioned by King Louis Philippe, 1832, The Louvre

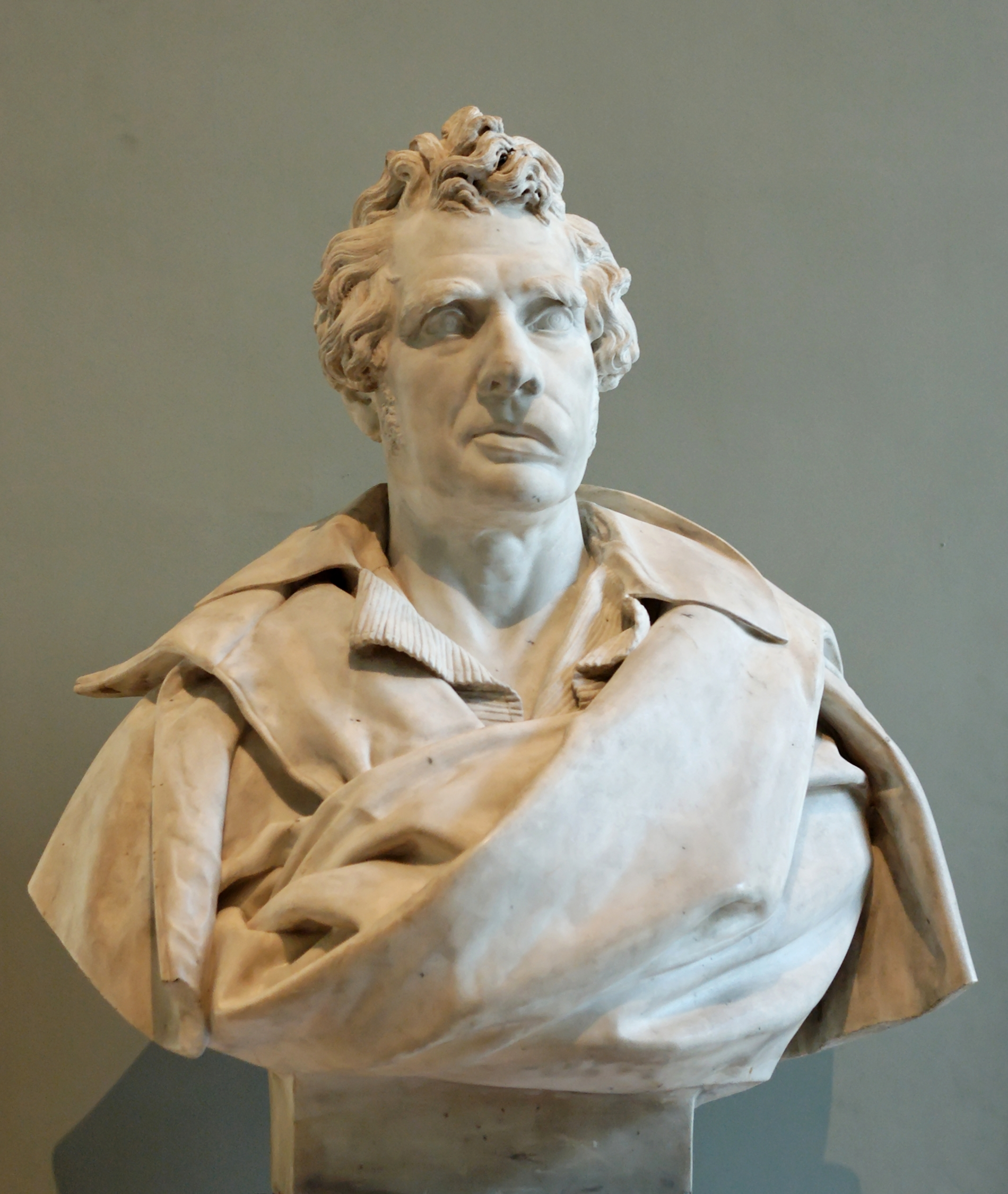
Bust of Jacques-Louis David, 1838

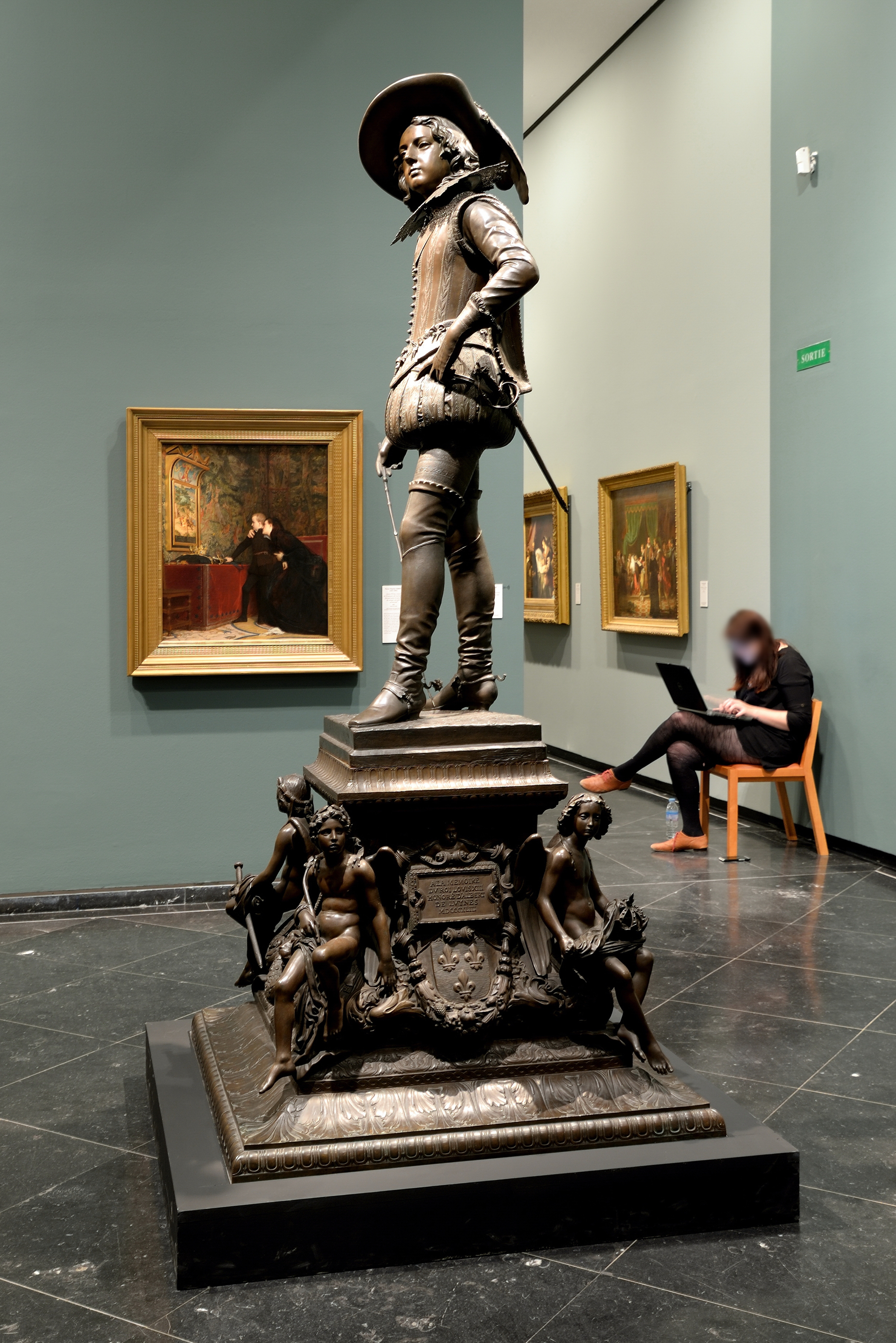
The adolescent Louis XIII, 1843, Museum of Fine Arts, Lyon

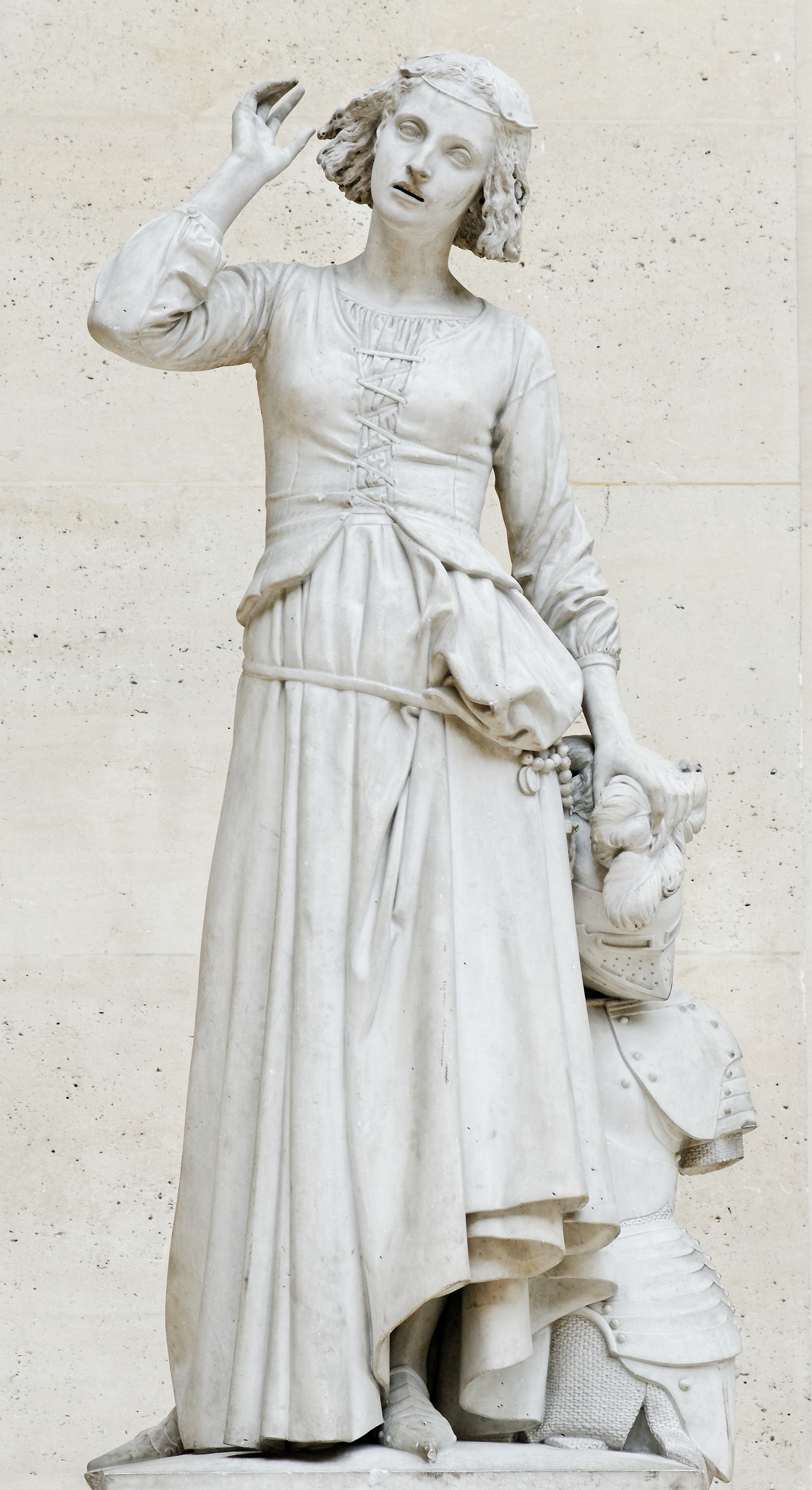
Joan of Arc listening to her voices, 1845, The Louvre

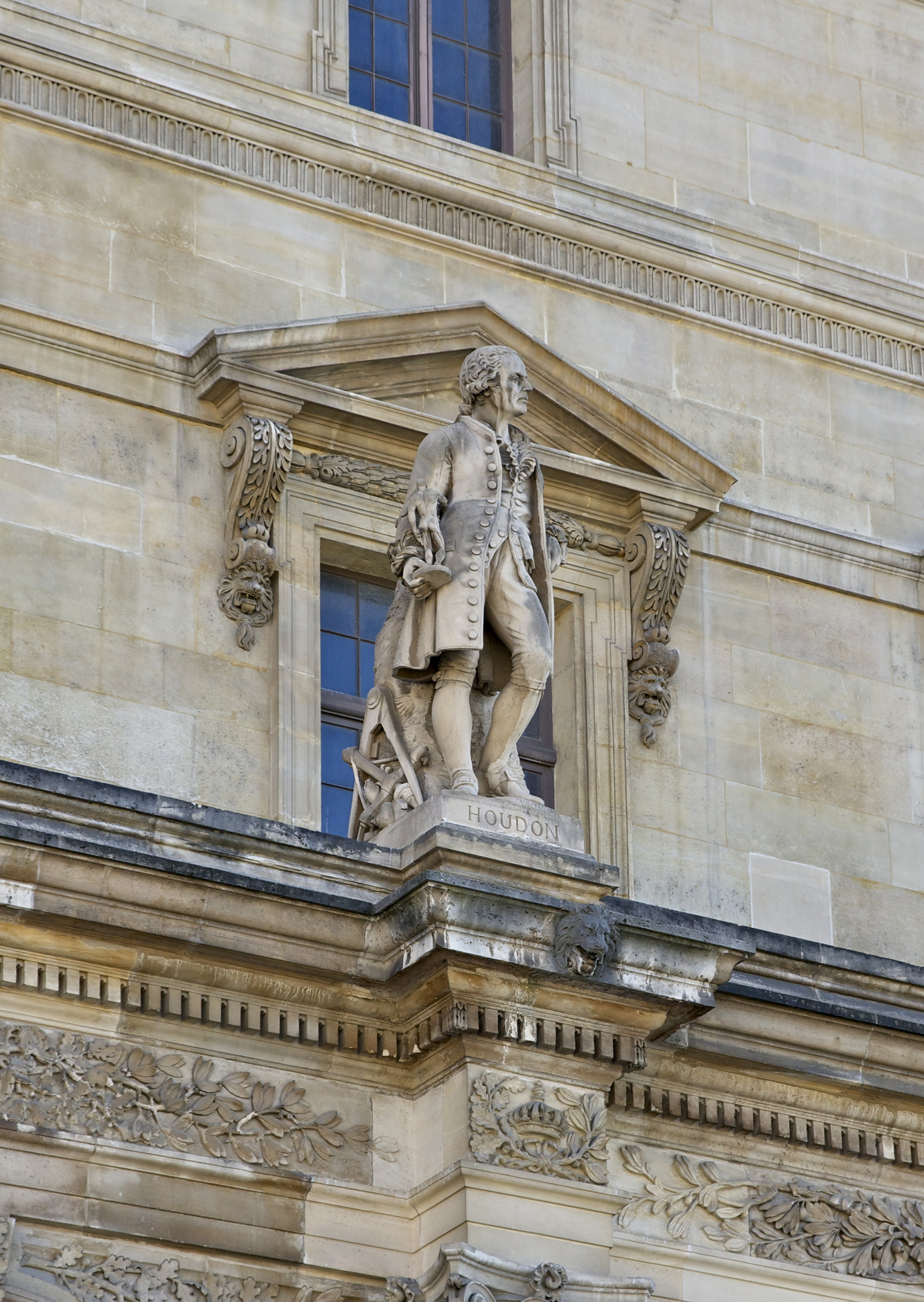
Statue of the sculptor Jean-Antoine Houdon, 1847, facade of the Denon wing of the Louvre

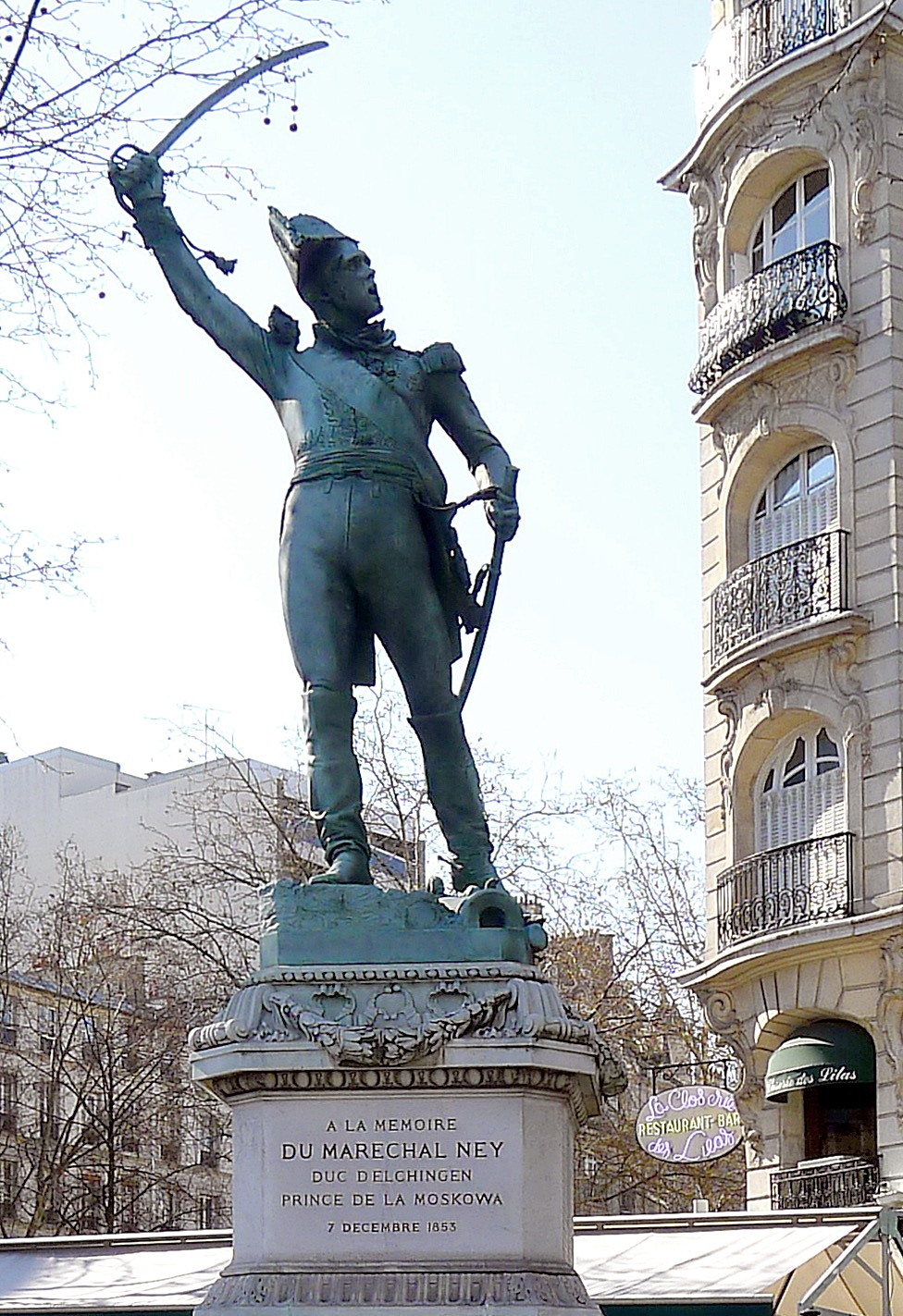
Statue of Maréchal Michel Ney, 1853

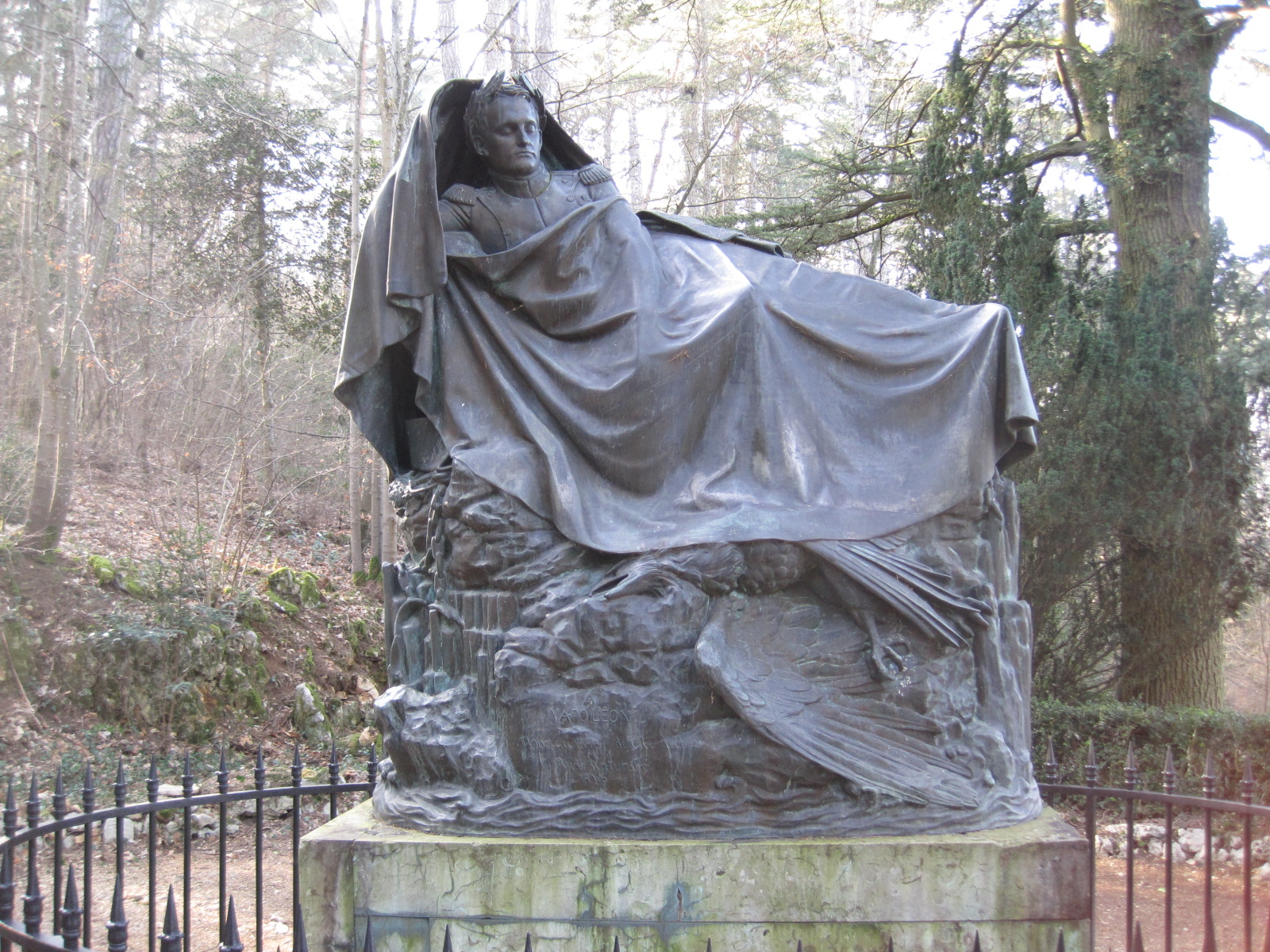
Napoleon Awakening to Immortality, 1846, Parc Noisot, Fixin

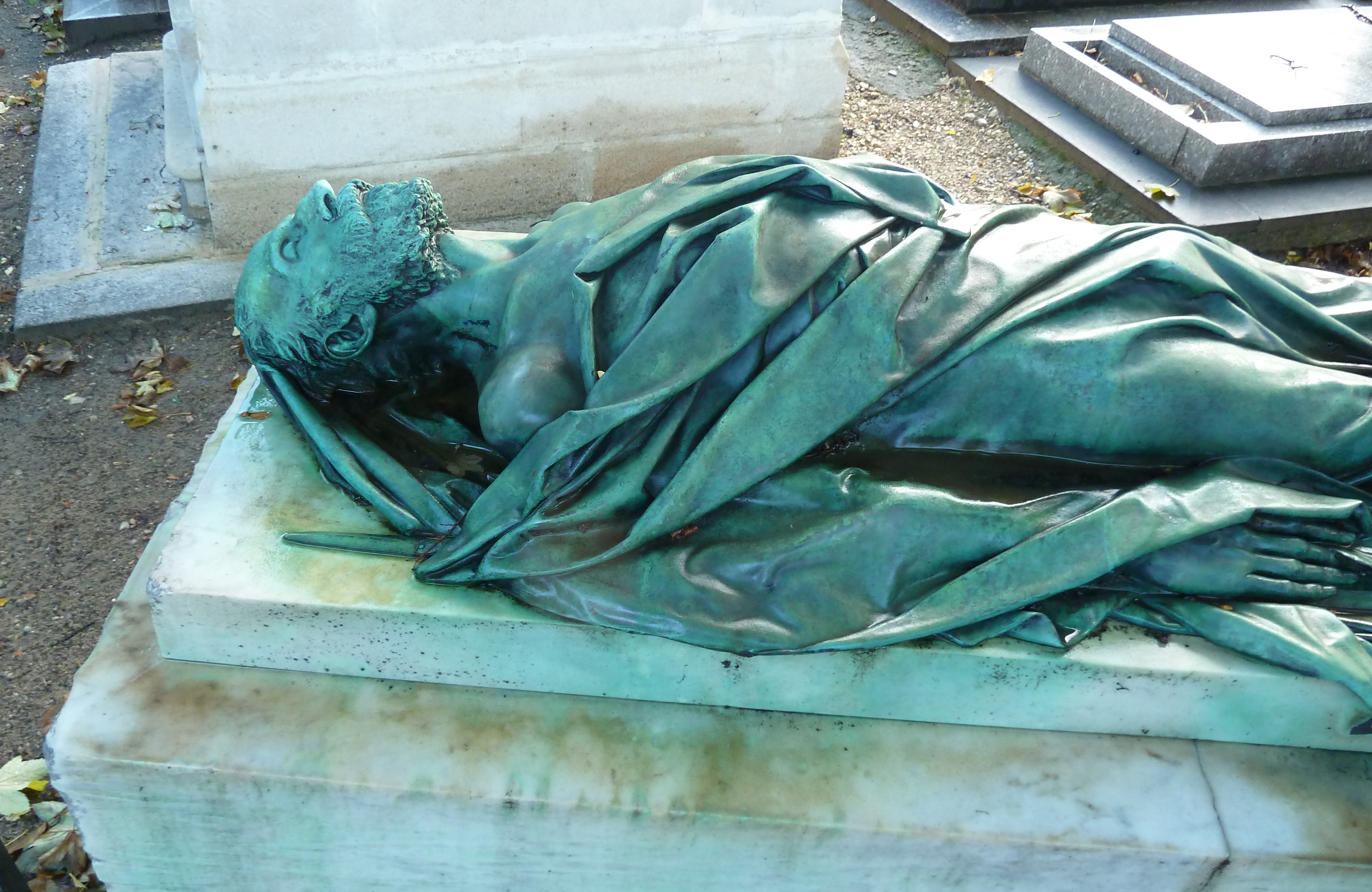
Tomb of Éléonore-Louis Godefroi Cavaignac, 1847

== Late works and death ==
Late works by Rude included a Calvary in bronze for the high altar of St Vincent de Paul (1852). Late in his life, he was commissioned by the Museum of Fine Arts of Dijon to make a work on a subject of his choosing; he chose a mythological work, Hebe and the Eagle of Jupiter (1852). Other late works included Love Triumphant (1855–57; and Head of Christ (1852). After his death, the two unfinished works were completed by his student and stepson, Paul Cabet, and they were shown at the Paris Salon of 1857.

Rude received a medal for his lifetime work at the Paris International Exposition of 1855. Shortly afterwards, on 3 November 1855, Rude died at his Paris residence at rue d'Enfer 3. He was buried at Montparnasse Cemetery in Paris.

Toward the end of his life, Rude made several notable religious sculptures, including the sculptural decoration of a pulpit for the Church of St. Etienne in Lille. His major religious works include a Baptism of Christ now in the Church of the Madeleine, and a smaller bust of Christ on the Cross finished in 1855, not long before his death, and now in the Louvre. The statue Love, dominator of the world, was one of his last works, commissioned by the Dijon Museum of Fine Arts. He died before it was completed. It was finished by his pupil and stepson Paul Cabet, and was shown in the Paris Salon of 1857.

The Dijon Museum of Fine Arts, the Musée d'Orsay and the Louvre have notable collections of his works.

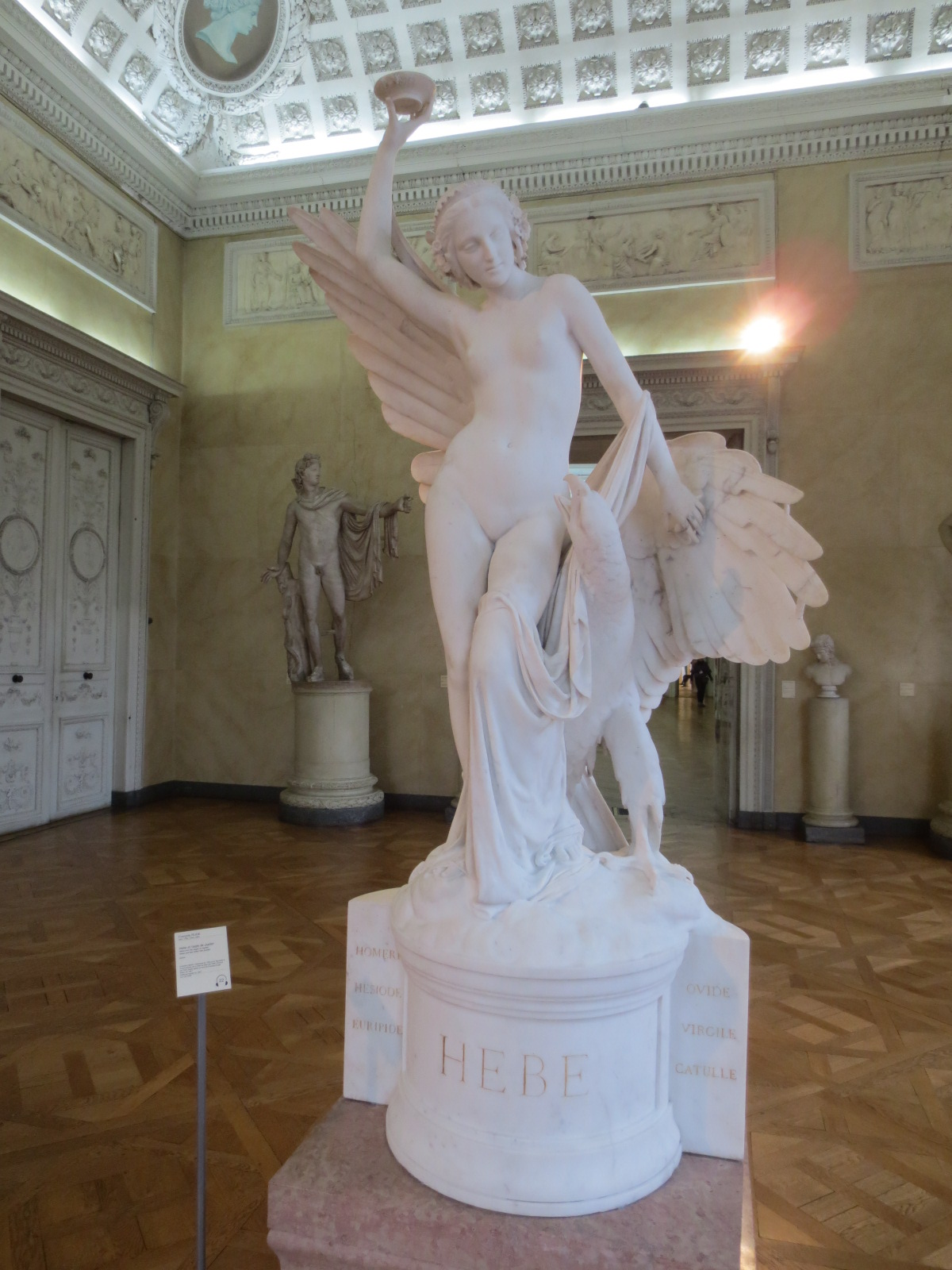
Hebe and the Eagle of Jupiter, 1851, Dijon Museum of Fine Arts

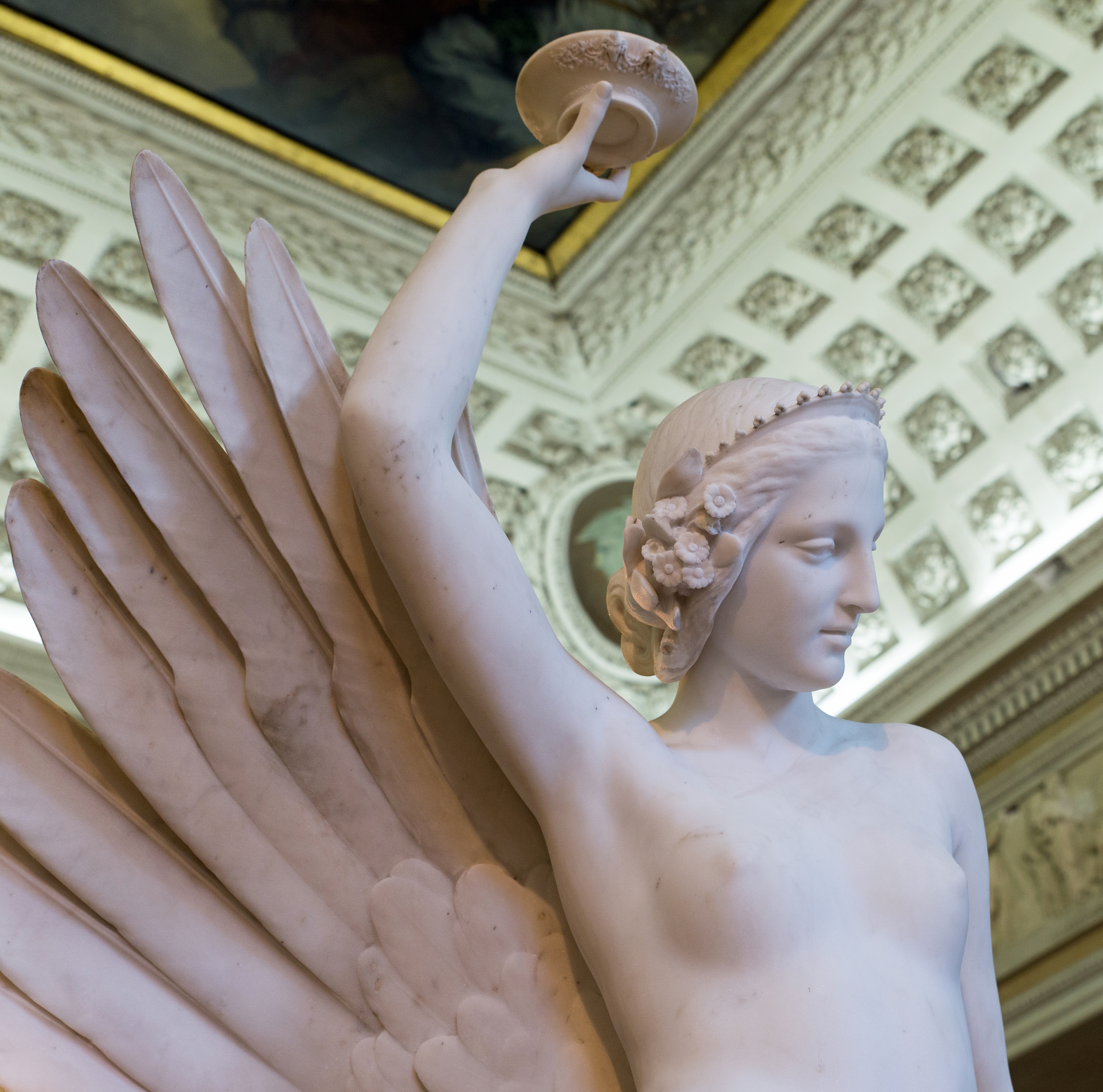
Detail of Hebe and the Eagle of Jupiter, 1851

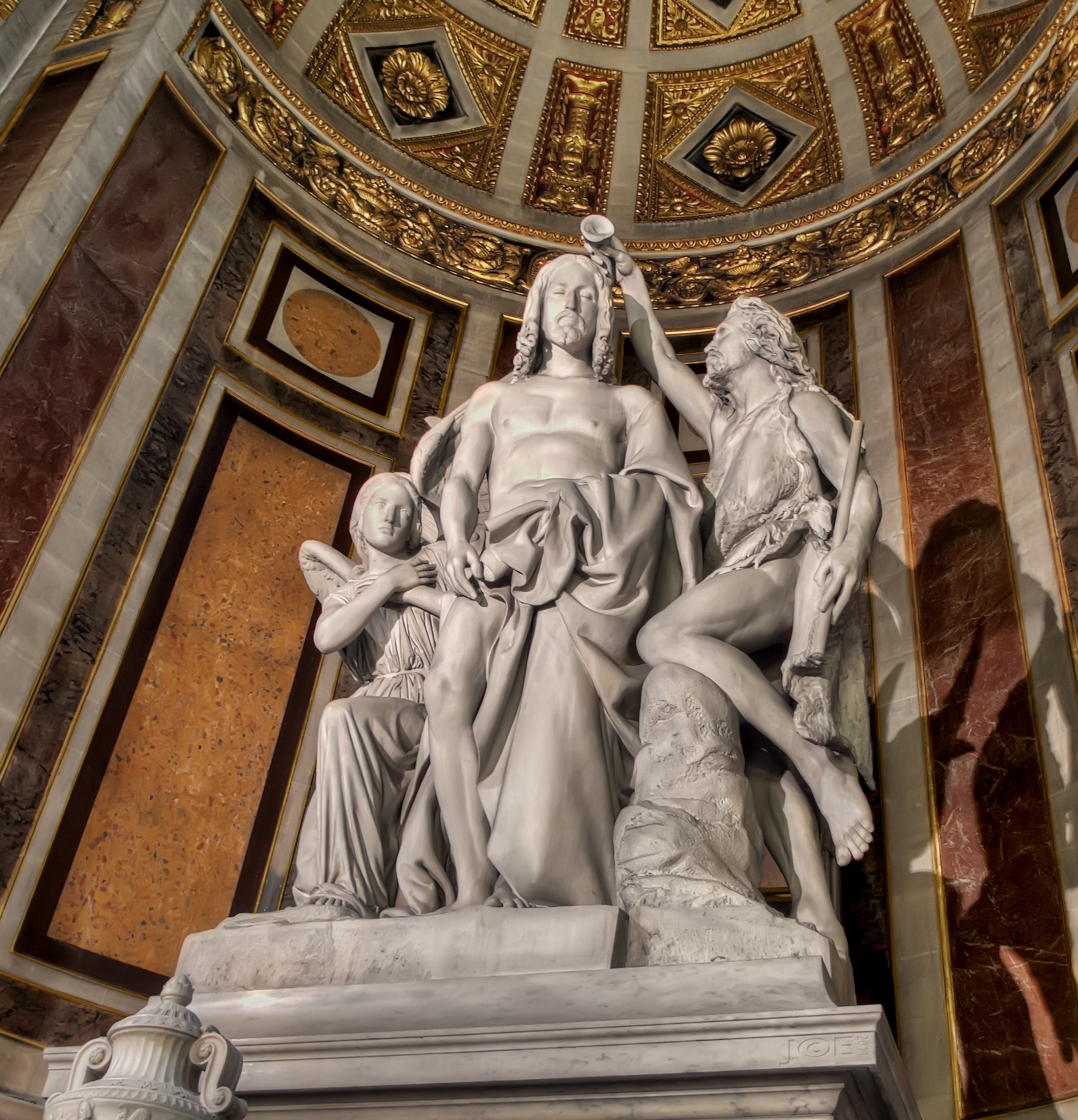
Baptism of Christ, Church of the Madeleine, Paris

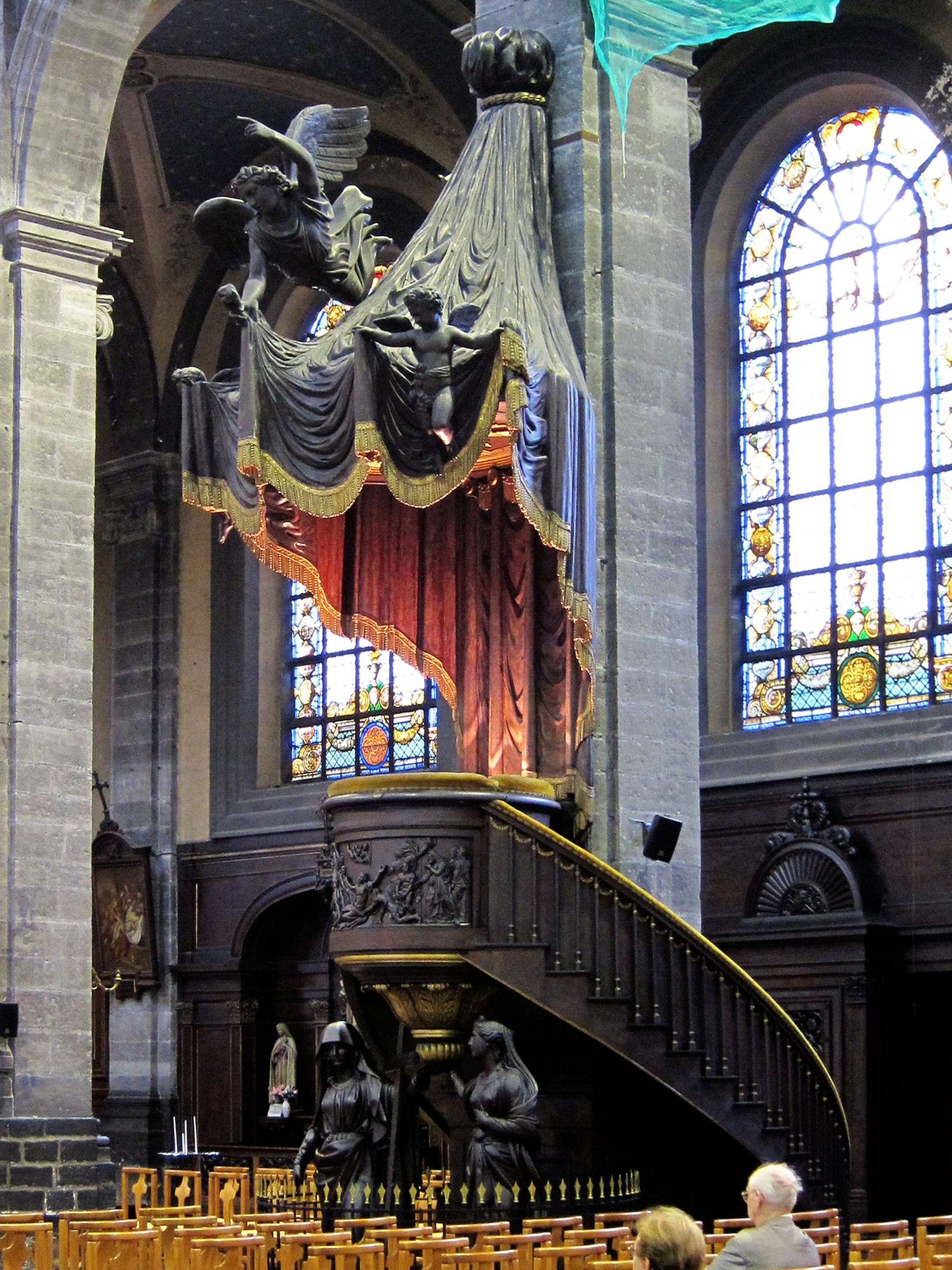
The pulpit of the Church of St. Etienne, Lille

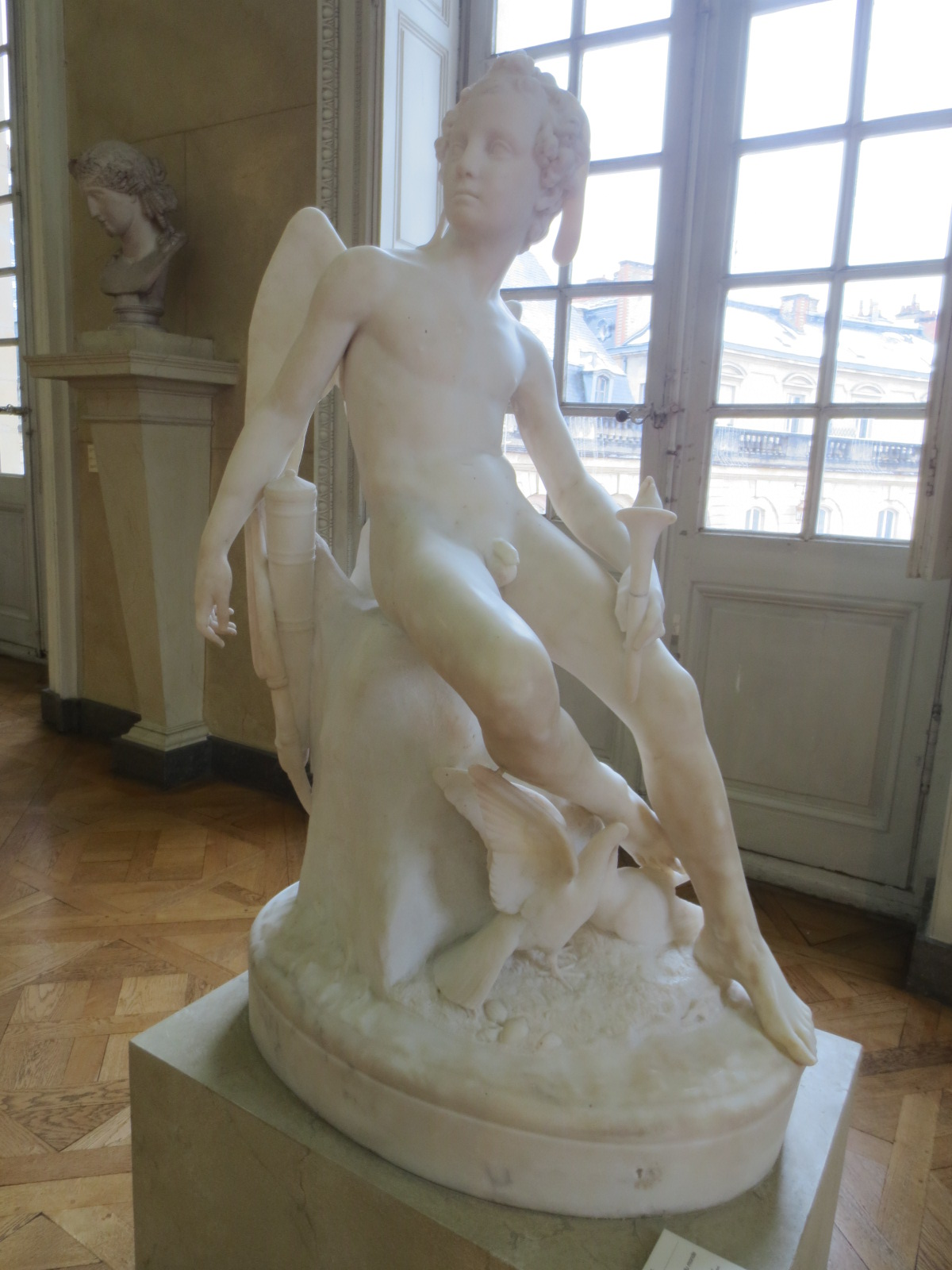
Love, dominator of the world, 1857, Dijon Museum of Fine Arts

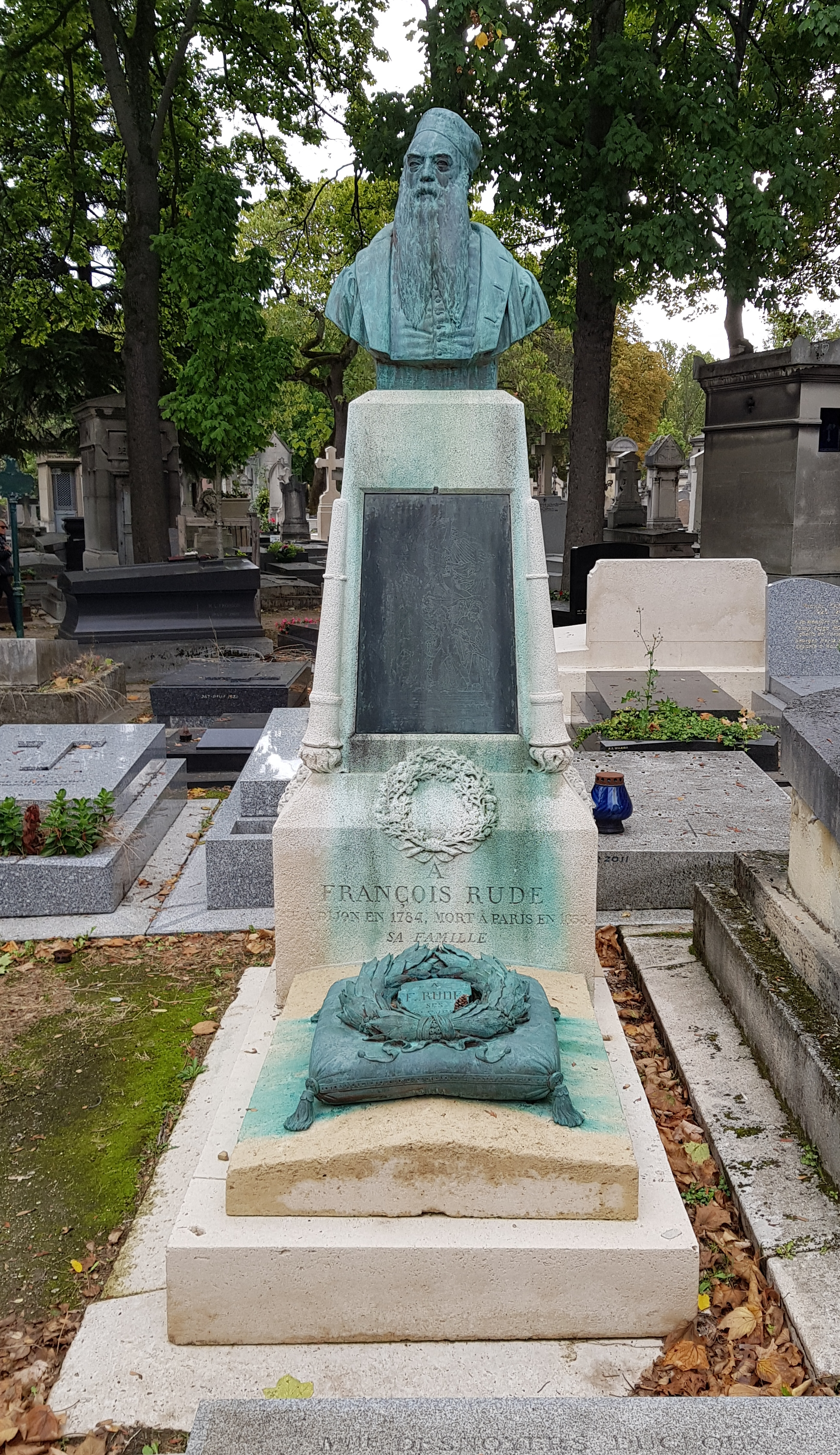
Grave on Montparnasse Cemetery, sculpture by Paul Cabet, 1856

== Pupils ==
Rude's pupil Charles-Auguste Lebourg became famous for the Wallace fountains in Paris. Another important pupil of Rude was Jean-Baptiste Carpeaux, who subsequently executed his own interpretation of a Neapolitan Fisher Boy, a popular subject at the time.

== Musée Rude ==
The Musée Rude in Dijon, inaugurated in 1947, is devoted to plaster casts of his works that were acquired by the city of Dijon, between 1887 and 1910; it is housed in the transept of the 11th-century church of Saint-Etienne in rue Vaillant.

== Bibliography ==
- Jeancolas, Claude (1992). Sculpture Française. Paris: CELIV. ISBN 2-86535-162-9.

== See also ==
- List of works by François Rude
- French sculpture
