= Île des Cygnes (former island) =

Former island in Paris, France

Coordinates: 48°51′42″N 2°17′46″E

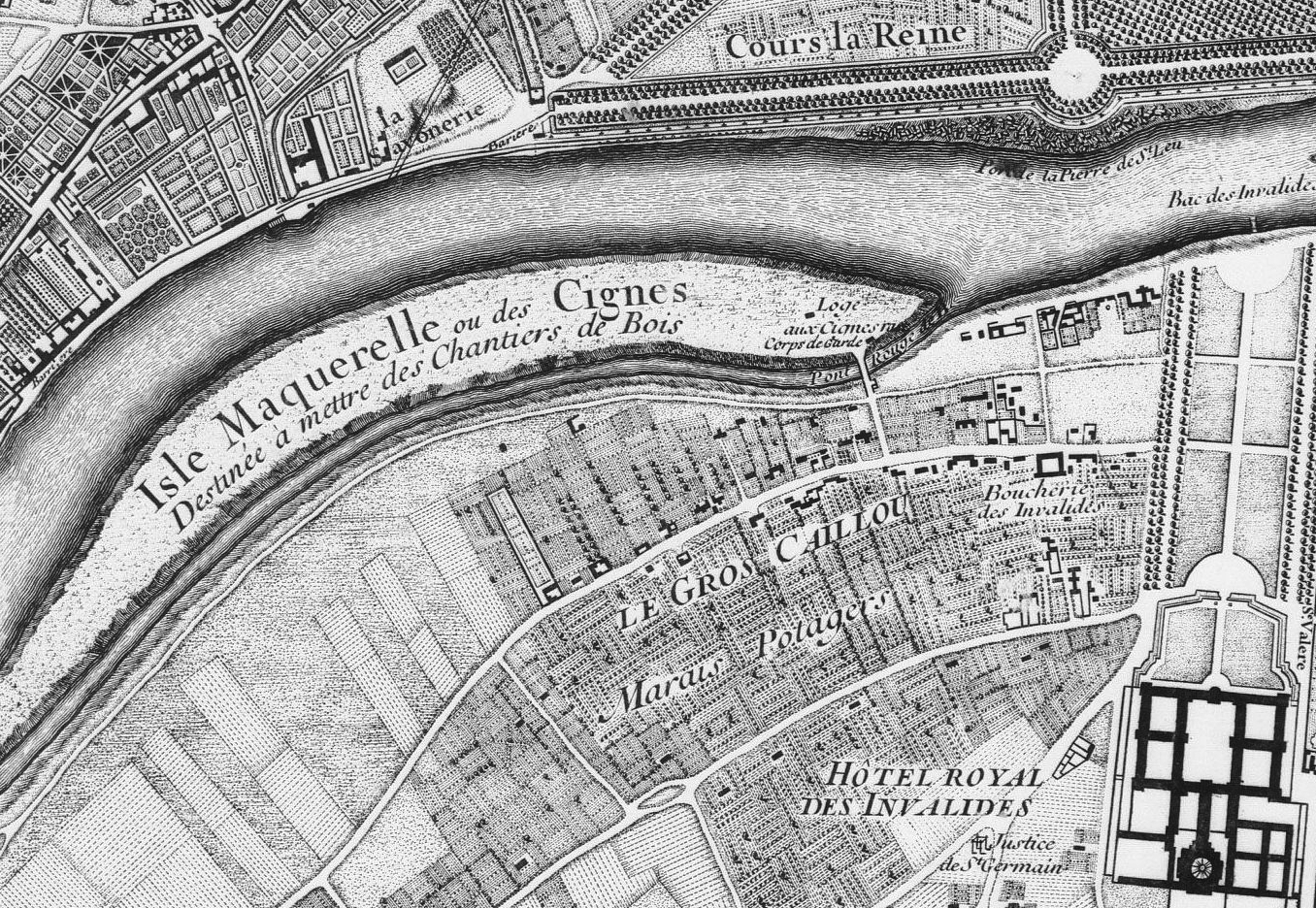
"Isle Maquerelle ou des Cignes", linked to the Rive Gauche by the "pont rouge" – Roussel's map of Paris, 1731

The Île des Cygnes or Île Maquerelle was an island on the river Seine in Paris. It was in the northwest part of the 7th arrondissement, between the Rue de l'Université and the Seine, the Invalides and the Champ de Mars. The current-day Musée du Quai Branly is located on it.

It was formed by the merger of the islets known as île des Treilles, île aux Vaches, île Maquerelle, île de Jérusalem and île de Longchamp, and was merged into the rive gauche of the Seine at the end of the 18th century.

== History ==
An oak pirogue, built with fir plugs, discovered in August 1806 during the construction of the footings for Pont d'Iéna, was thought to be a Norman boat dating to the Siege of Paris in 885/86, although some scholars believe that it may have dated to the Sequani tribe from the first century B.C.

In the 13th century the peasants of Chaillot on the opposite bank had the right to graze their cattle on the île Maquerelle, in exchange for a payment in kind paid to the Abbaye de Saint-Germain-des-Prés. The right to fermage was 20 livres in 1492, and the bail de l'herbe rose to 27 livres in 1551. In 1572 1,200 victims of the St. Bartholomew's Day massacre were buried here. The island was renamed Île des Cygnes after the swans placed there by a royal decree of 16 October 1676. The garde-cygnes were in charge of looking after them "from pont de Saint-Cloud as far as Saint-Maur and Corbeil" during the winter. The garde-cygnes's house was inventoried among the royal building accounts. The island was also the site of the ministry of public works dépôt des marbres.

The king finally ceded the island to the city of Paris on 21 March 1722. Around 1731 it was the site of a lodge where wood was cut into logs and stored for firewood, carpentry or boat repairs. At this time the island was linked to the rive gauche on its eastern extremity by the "pont des Cignes" or "pont rouge". Jean-Jacques Rousseau promenaded on the island. Letters patent allowing the City of Paris to fill in the channel separating île des Cygnes from the Gros-Caillou quarter were signed on 20 June 1773, and a partial filling-in of the channel is reported in 1780. In 1782 the island was the site of a lamp-oil factory On 11 April 1786 a police decree ordered that "all offal of bulls, cows and sheep continue to be brought to the île des Cygnes to be prepared and cooked there as is the custom". In 1789, the brothers Jacques and Augustin Charles Périer were commissioned by the city of Paris to set up steam mills on the island to meet the flour shortage due to the Seine's winter water levels being too low to power its watermills. Their installation was made up of two steam engines with twelve driving wheels, each 1.95m in diameter. It opened on 30 November 1790 in the presence of the mayor. In 1802-1803 the American inventor Robert Fulton conducted his experiments on steam navigation from the island. In 1812, during the construction of the pont d'Iéna, the rest of the channel was filled in.
