= Besançon-les-Bains =

Thermal establishment in Besançon

Besançon-les-Bains, then and now

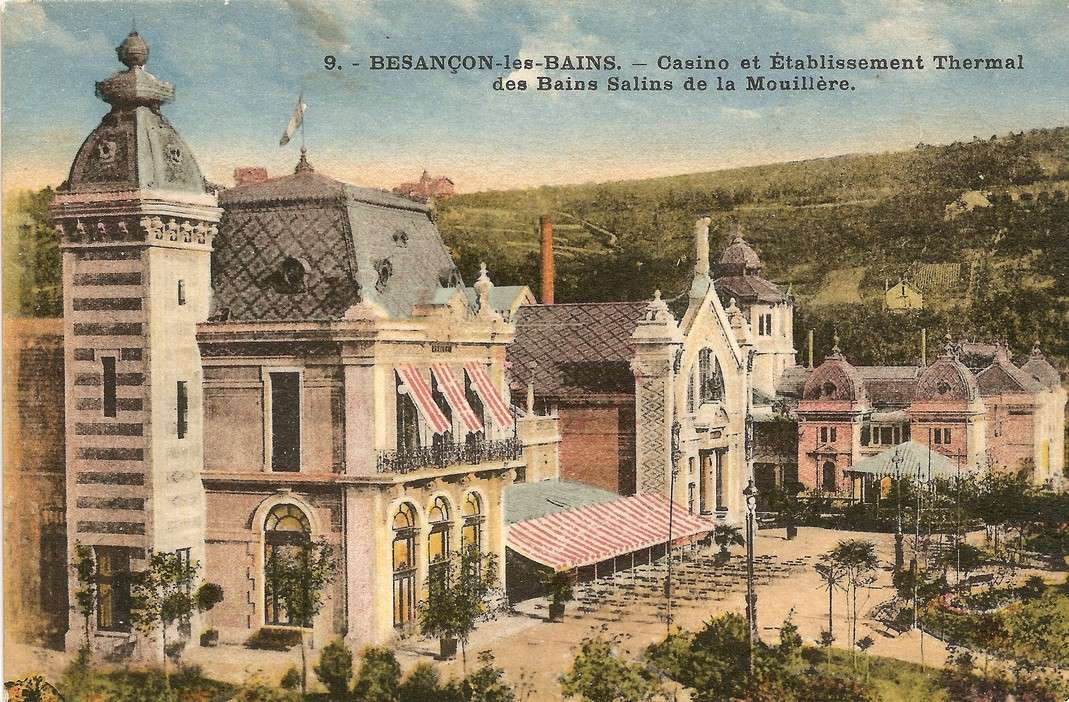
Postcard from Besançon-les-Bains, undated.

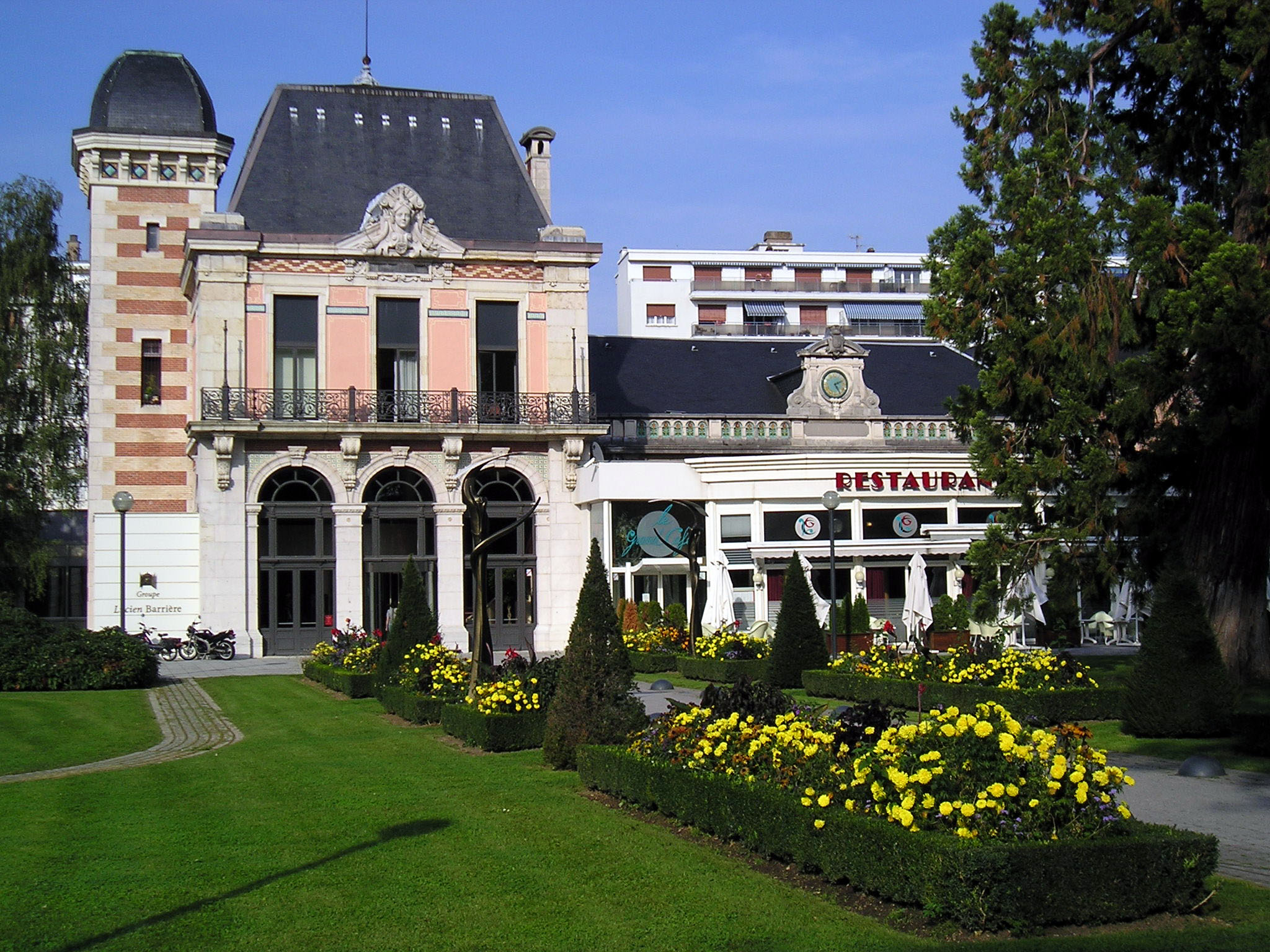
The Besançon casino, nowadays.

47°14′35.05″N 6°1′51.65″E

Besançon-les-Bains (Note: The name Besançon-les-Bains was not an official toponym (so the town was still officially called Besançon).) was a former thermal establishment in Besançon during the 19th century. The term "Besançon-les-Bains" is also employed to denote a period during which Besançon was economically oriented towards tourism and thermal spa activities, which enjoyed considerable popularity during the nineteenth century.

In 1891, the Compagnie des Bains salins de la Mouillère was established, marking the beginning of tourism development around the Besançon-les-Bains attraction. This led to the construction of several notable establishments, including a thermal spa, the Hôtel des Bains, a casino, the Kursaal performance hall, and the opening of a tourist office in May 1896.

== From Miserey to Besançon ==
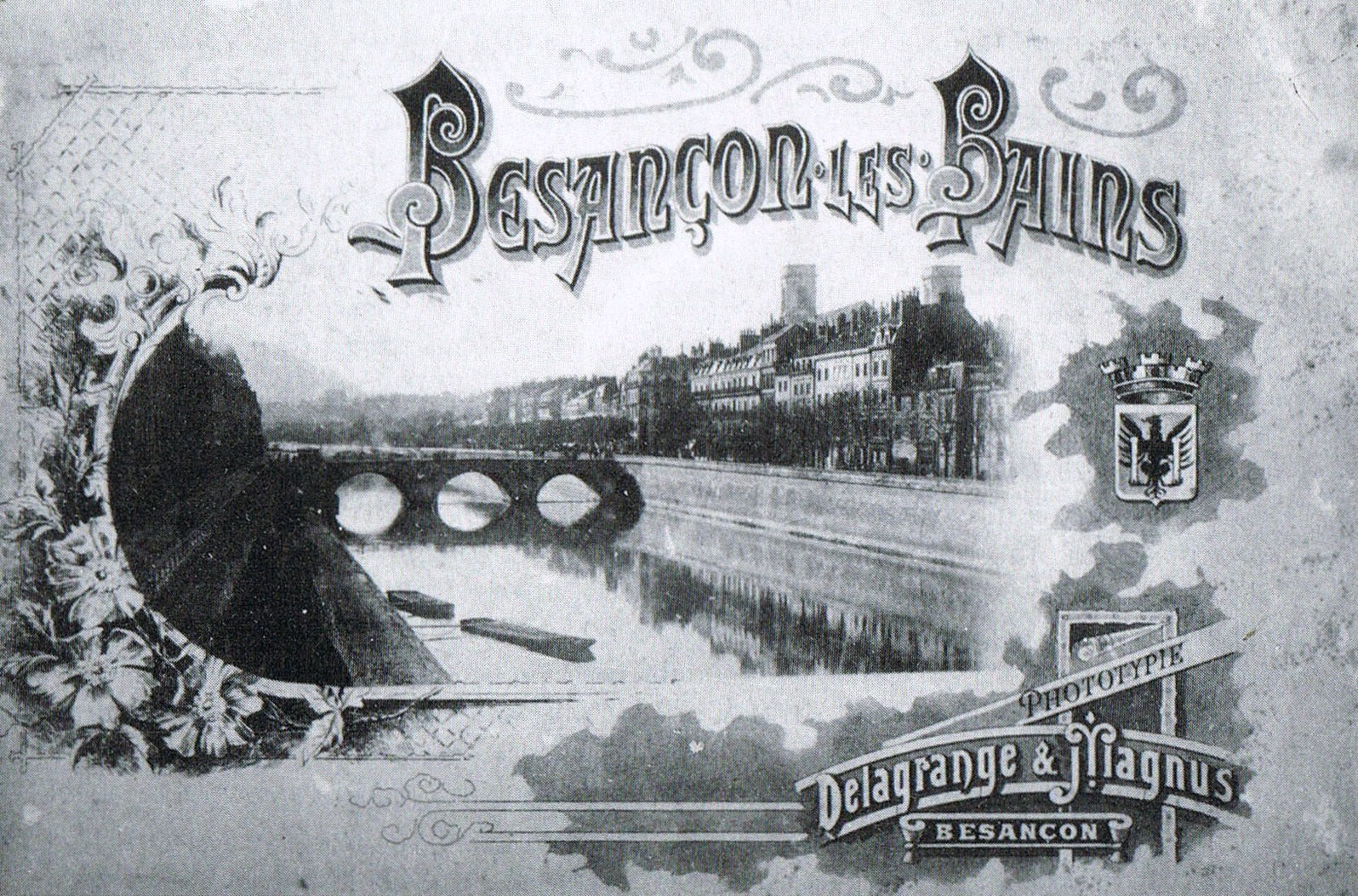
Postcard from Besançon-les-Bains, undated. View of the Doubs River and the La Boucle and Battant districts.

The Franche-Comté region's unique hydrographic and geological history make it an ideal setting for the discovery of elements that can be harnessed for the development of thermal spa treatments, particularly salt deposits. Approximately 200 million years ago, a vast body of water covered an extensive area that spanned from Switzerland to Burgundy and from the Saône Valley to the Rhône Valley. This region is historically and geographically significant, and is often referred to as the "Salt Route." As a result of global warming, the sea evaporated, leaving behind a thick layer of rock salt. This salt was subsequently penetrated by underground streams through geological folds, resulting in the production of resurgent waters enriched with trace elements, which are beneficial for the body. These waters were first exploited during antiquity but were subsequently forgotten. However, they regained interest in Europe during the Belle Époque, a period characterized by a fashionable inclination towards "taking the waters", or indulging in the benefits of thermal treatments.

During the summer of 1866, mining engineer Boyer and his successor Résal were engaged in a routine survey of the village of Miserey near Besançon when they observed a collection of plants in the vicinity of a spring that exhibited a distinctive morphology, not characteristic of the surrounding flora. These plants bore a striking resemblance to seaweed. The two men proceeded to conduct analyses and drilling operations to ascertain the saline properties of the water and its potential suitability for the establishment of a thermal spa business, a popular enterprise at the time. However, following unsuccessful results and due to the reluctance of the landowner where the spring was located, who refused to sell his property, Boyer and Résal were compelled to search for alternative locations in the village that might meet their criteria. In 1868, two years after the initial investigations, they identified a site 250 meters from the spring containing a 55-meter-thick salt deposit, whose owner was more amenable.

The Miserey area proved to be an exceptional deposit, containing a vast salt layer that gave rise to strong chlorinated sodium saline waters and iodo-brominated waters, among the best in Europe. These waters are 27 times more active than seawater and contain 291 grams of sodium chloride per liter of water, as well as approximately 323 grams of saline elements per liter of water, including 2.25 grams of bromide and potassium. These characteristics rival the waters of Germany, Austria, or Switzerland, which are known to be the best on the continent. The city of Besançon, situated a mere six kilometers from the village, offers the tranquility of a medium-sized town, coupled with an exceptional climate, architectural heritage, and quality of life. Furthermore, the region boasts above-average medical care, with one practitioner serving approximately 744 inhabitants, as well as numerous pharmacists and dentists. The location and timing appear optimal for the establishment of a thermal spa in the capital of the Franche-Comté region. A new figure has emerged. Achille Vialatte, a Parisian who claims to have previously served as a director of a thermal spa and who maintains cordial relations with the municipal authorities of Besançon, is motivated by the prospect of financial gain. This represents a significant opportunity for him, as well as for Boyer and Résal, to reach an agreement regarding the establishment of a thermal spa company in Besançon.

== From project to conception ==
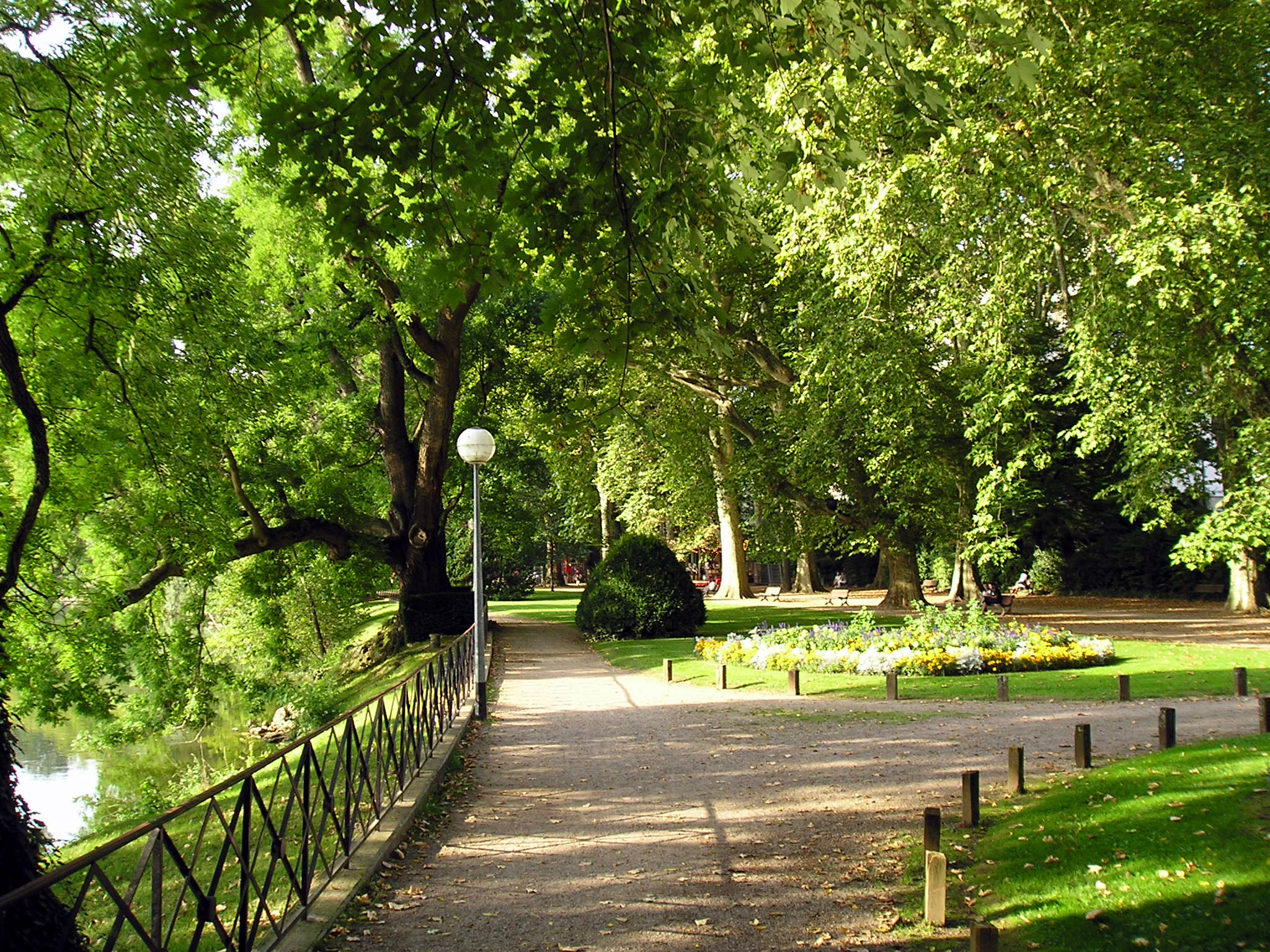
The city's setting, and in particular its green spaces, played a major role in determining the future location of the Bains. Here, Parc Micaud, one of the city's most beautiful parks.

The three men undertook the task of identifying a suitable location for the construction of new facilities to accommodate the future Besançon-les-Bains thermal establishment. The land close to the Tour de la Pelote was unsuitable for construction purposes, as it was under the ownership of the military, who were reluctant to relinquish it. The historic center was swiftly eliminated as an option due to its limited spatial capacity. The Montrapon-Fontaine-Écu area was deemed unsuitable due to its distance from the city center. Chamars was similarly excluded due to its proximity to slaughterhouses and a dynamite factory. The Mouillère site, however, proved to be the subject of considerable interest. On August 24, 1890, Vialatte delivered an impassioned discourse on the merits of the proposed site. "Beyond the road, the verdant meadows and majestic trees of Micaud, the meandering currents of the Doubs and the elevated grounds of the Roman citadel, with its rugged cliffs and the elevated grounds of Bregille with its pure and beneficial spring, its vineyards, its alluring villas, its watercress beds; to the right, the verdant expanses of Chaprais speckled with crimson rooftops, and the shady woodlands of the glacis, a true English park."

Subsequently, a collective of men conceptualized the establishment of a thermal facility, a gaming venue, and a lodging establishment, collectively encompassing a two-hectare area, with the integration of verdant gardens. However, by November 1890, the project underwent a significant reduction in scope. On December 10 of the same year, Achille Vialatte was subjected to a series of attacks. "The challenge of procuring the requisite parcels for the project compels him to adopt a more pragmatic approach in conceptualizing the future spa." Concurrently, the projected costs escalated dramatically, from an initial estimate of one million francs in August 1890 to nearly two million in September of the same year. The cost of materials and construction services exhibited considerable variability, with estimates varying by up to 300% from one another. In February 1892, the total cost of the thermal complex was established at 1,623,354 gold francs. Vialatte employed a variety of strategies to limit costs, including securing the donation of the inaugural source of thermal water from the commune of Miserey, obtaining a 150,000 franc subsidy from the city of Besançon, and negotiating the provision of free fresh water for ten years.

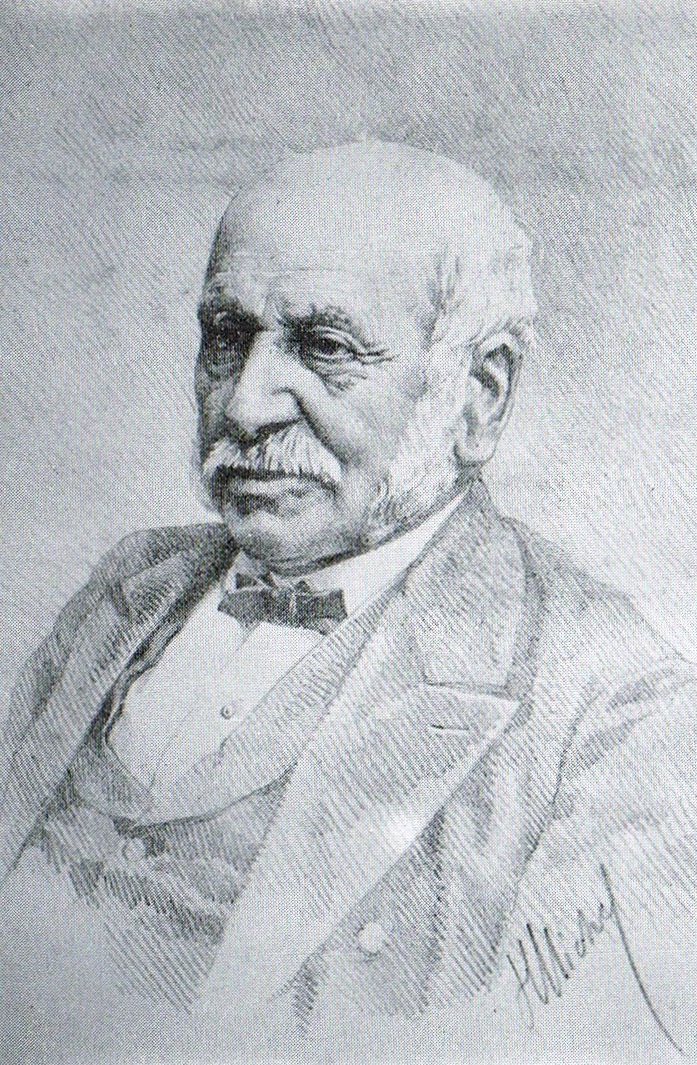
Architect Alfred Ducat, one of the designers of the grand hôtel des bains.

In return, Achille Vialatte consented to the appointment of local architects for the construction of the buildings, the reservation of at least six cabins for indigent individuals, the inclusion of a medical office within the establishment, and the donation of ten percent of the profits to the city's welfare office. In November 1890, 1,800 shares were made available for purchase, and on December 23 of the same year, the subscription period concluded with the sale of 1,130 shares. The majority of administrators involved in the casino and baths, including Vialatte, Forie, Pateu, Sandoz, Delavelle, and Savoye, were aware from the outset that the thermal complex would require a significant degree of attention to ensure its success. They recognized the necessity of positioning it as the new flagship location of the city. Significant emphasis was placed on advertising, even hiring Mr. Dusso, the former administrator of the Villa des Fleurs in Aix-les-Bains and the current head of the Cercle Anglais in Paris, to oversee the new thermal spa. Vialatte, who acquired 100 of these shares, guaranteed an annual return of 10% and reserved a 20% share of the casino's annual profits for himself.

The total number of subscribers was 509. Of these, 300 subscribed for 20 shares, 100 for 10 shares, and 209 for a single share. Most subscribers were ordinary individuals without significant wealth, as the city's bourgeoisie, for reasons that remain unclear, chose to refrain from participating in the operation. In less than three months, the adjudication of the work was carried out, yet the files were not adequately prepared. On May 7, 1891, the Pateu company from Chaprais was awarded the casino contract, followed by the baths contract on May 26 of the same year. Finally, the hotel contract was awarded in the early autumn of 1892. Vialatte fulfilled his commitments, with all the architects being from the city. The bath plans were designed by Maurice Boutterin and Louis Rouzet, the casino by Maurice Forien, and the plans for the grand hotel were created by Alfred Ducat and Boutterin once more. Additionally, the contributions of various other professionals were instrumental in the realization of the ambitious project. These included painters such as Antonin Fanart, Émile Isenbart, Édouard Baille, Raoul Maurice Trémolières, and Léon Boudot, as well as sculptors Jean-Antoine Injalbert and Just Becquet. Arthur Nicklès, a renowned pharmacist, played a pivotal role in developing the Guide du baigneur, while plans were also underway for the establishment of a dedicated tourist office.

== Construction of the thermal complex ==
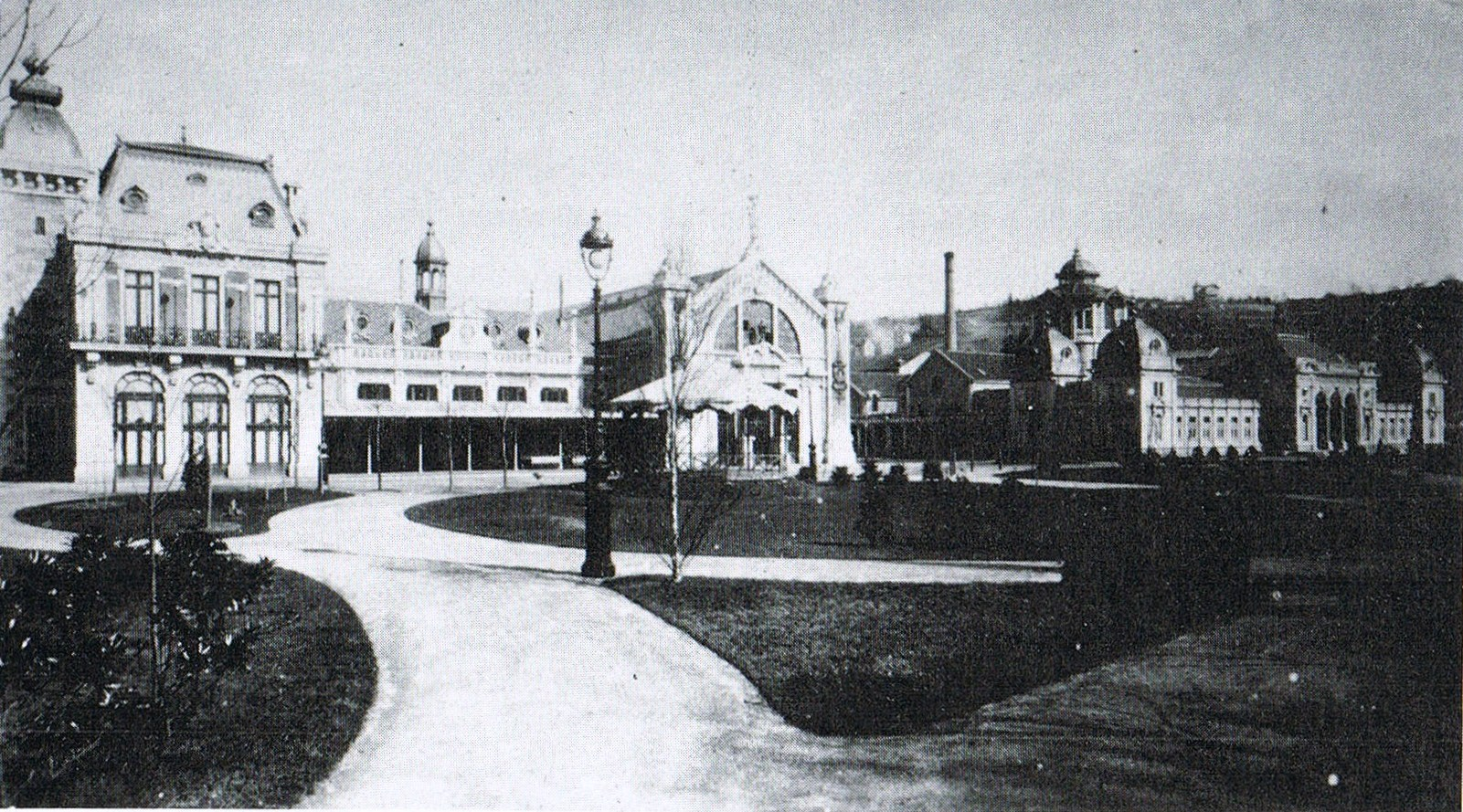
The spa complex: from left to right, the games rooms, restaurant, village hall and baths building.

The construction of the buildings commenced in early August 1891 and was concluded in 1893. On February 16, 1892, the comprehensive blueprint for the prospective thermal establishment was exhibited in the Beaux-Arts window situated near the Granvelle Palace. Subsequently, on May 16 of the same year, the local newspaper Les Gaudes published an article about the Company, to substantiate the project's veracity and refute the most outlandish rumors that were pervasive at the time. However, the baths, which were less profitable than the casino, were ultimately deemed less essential and thus sacrificed in favor of the latter. This was because the Company lacked sufficient liquidity and began to incur debt, leading to a situation where everything was bet on the gaming tables. However, following the July 10, 1892, opening of the casino, enthusiasm for the baths in the Franche-Comté capital waned, particularly among the city's merchants, who disapproved of the extensive publicity surrounding the new establishment and the widespread printing of its name.

Following the laying of the foundation stone for the grand hotel, a further issue emerged. The imported materials, which were deemed to be of inferior quality by the Italian workers, prompted their discontent. These same workers were subsequently the subject of a contentious debate when 1,500 demonstrators assembled in front of the town hall on September 22, 1891, demanding the replacement of Italian workers with French workers. The popular and media outcry was significant, particularly when local press headlines included "Too many foreigners" and "Too many enemies being supported to the detriment of our compatriots." This led to the dismissal of these workers a few months later. The Italian workers were subsequently replaced by local labor. Historians have largely overlooked this episode. For example, Gaston Coindre's comprehensive book entitled Mon Vieux Besançon, written between 1900 and 1912, which details the history of the Comtois capital and its inhabitants, does not refer to the new spa station. It may be surmised that the author regarded the new Besançon, with its associated turmoil around the baths, as somewhat vulgar and harmful.

The gardens of the thermal establishment were notable for their extensive lawns, some of which were designed in the French style and constituted the private garden known as the "cercle." This garden covered a total area of 20,000 square meters. In addition to the casino and baths, croquet and tennis courts were constructed, along with a music kiosk. While a circus and a panorama were planned but ultimately unrealized, a dismantlable Art Nouveau-style open-air theater was erected in 1901 to provide free performances.

=== Casino and festivity hall ===
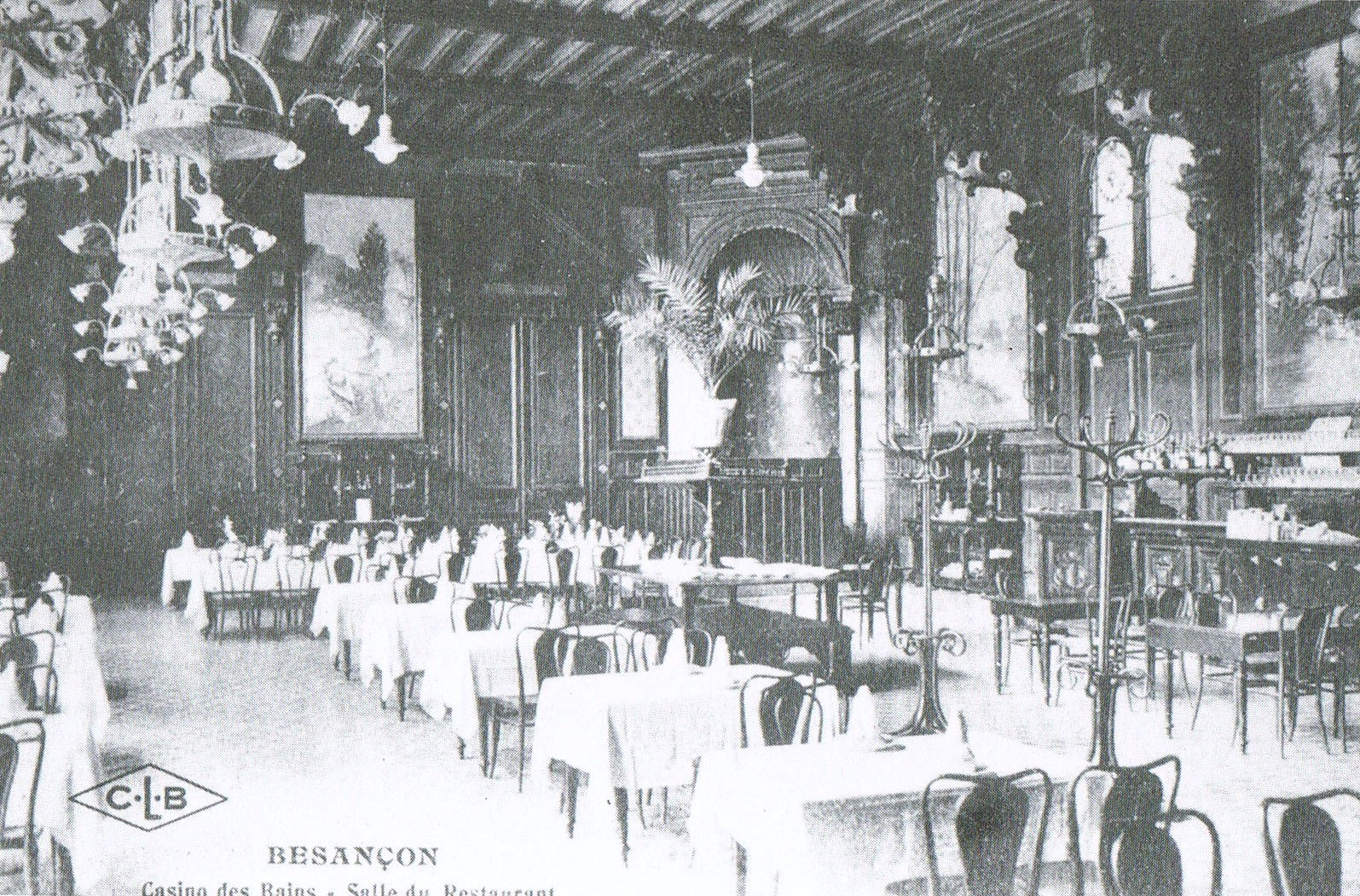
Casino restaurant.

The foundation stone of the casino was laid on August 3, 1891, followed by a ceremony featuring speeches from various notable figures, including Achille Vialatte. This event was similar in grandeur to the opening of the Grand Hotel. The Besançon-les-Bains casino was inaugurated on July 10, 1892, with a grand evening event that included a concert, ballet, and fireworks over the Doubs River. The building is situated within the gardens, exhibiting asymmetrical façades crafted from dressed stone. These façades are embellished with a plethora of decorative elements, including brightly colored ceramics, bronze ornaments, and sculptures. To the left of the casino were the gaming rooms and the "cercle", in the center of the restaurant, and to the right the festivity hall, all connected at the front by an imposing marquee. The "cercle" pavilion offered many gaming options, predominantly in the Greek Campana style. Additionally, it provided a reading room, a large salon adorned by sculptor Injalbert and painter Allard, a small salon in the Louis XVI style draped in silks, and a Japanese-style salon.

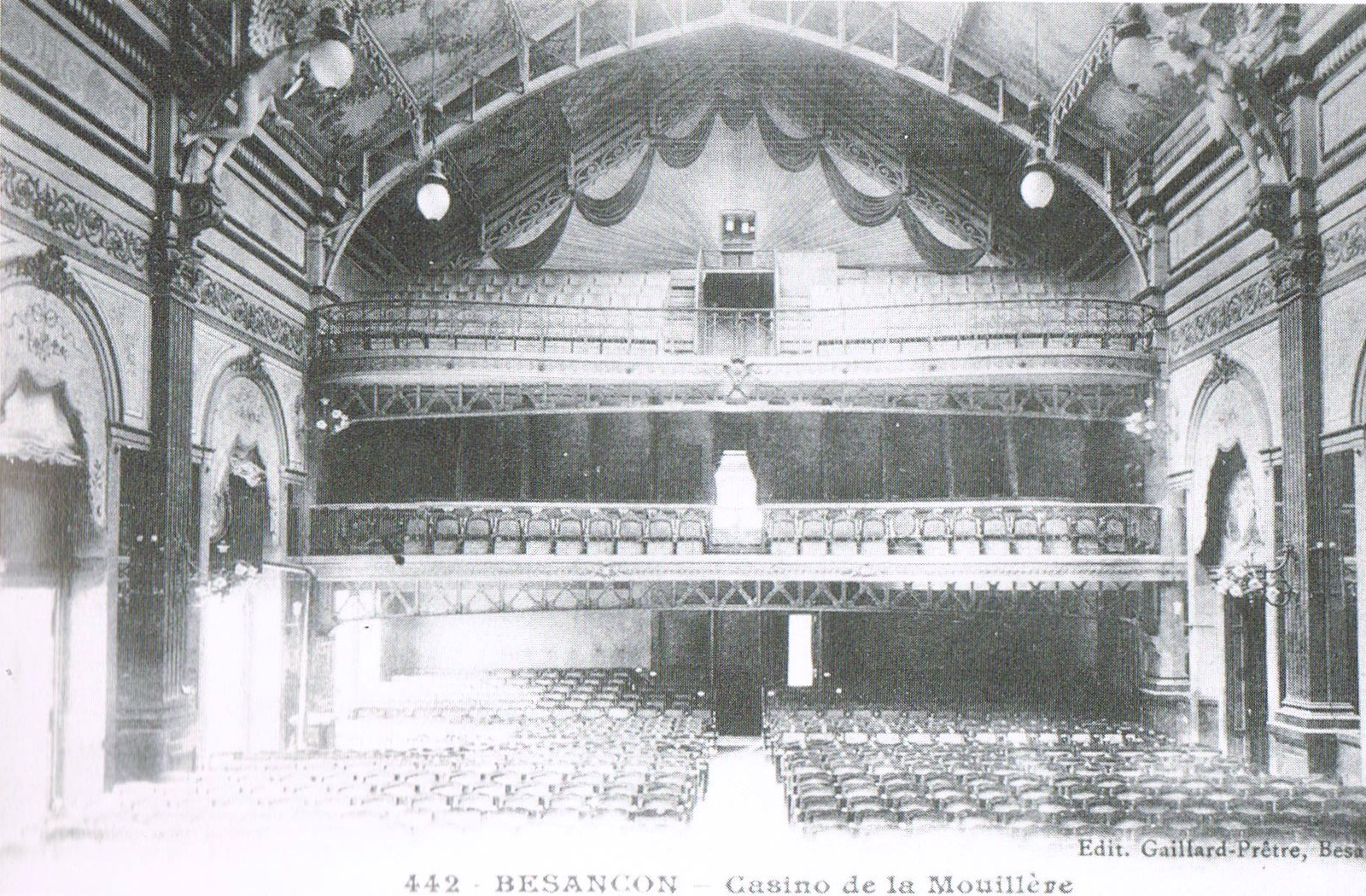
The casino's party hall.

The casino was anchored by a grand dining room, which spanned 25 meters in length and 14 meters in width. The dining room was furnished with dozens of tables arranged beneath a Renaissance-style ceiling, adorned with coffered panels and beams. These were supported by statues representing chimeras, and from their mouths hung imposing chandeliers made of nickel-plated copper, which were approximately seven meters in height. The walls were adorned with the most exquisite landscapes of Franche-Comté, attributed to the region's most esteemed painters. These included the rocky outcrops and castle of Thoraise, the citadel as seen from the Micaud promenade, the shadowy islands of the Doubs, and a boating scene in Mazagran at the foot of the Chaudanne hill. The kitchens and private salons were furnished with the latest in culinary and comfort amenities, complementing the installation of a building where the most esteemed chefs were in succession.

The casino also included a festivity hall, situated on the right side of the building. This hall was of considerable size and constructed from stone and iron. Its architectural design was the result of careful study and meticulous finishing. The hall was accessible through a grand vestibule with two stone staircases. The hall was surmounted by a statue of dance, created by Just Becquet, and was designed with a specific purpose in mind: to accommodate theatrical performances, operas, symphonic concerts, or balls. Additionally, the building encompassed a vast foyer, three levels of seating, and a superlative stage curtain bearing the signature of the Desservy company. The roof was ingeniously designed, allowing a portion of the ceiling to be retracted and opened to the starry sky when weather conditions permitted; however, this system was compromised during a storm on July 1, 1895.

=== Thermal establishment ===
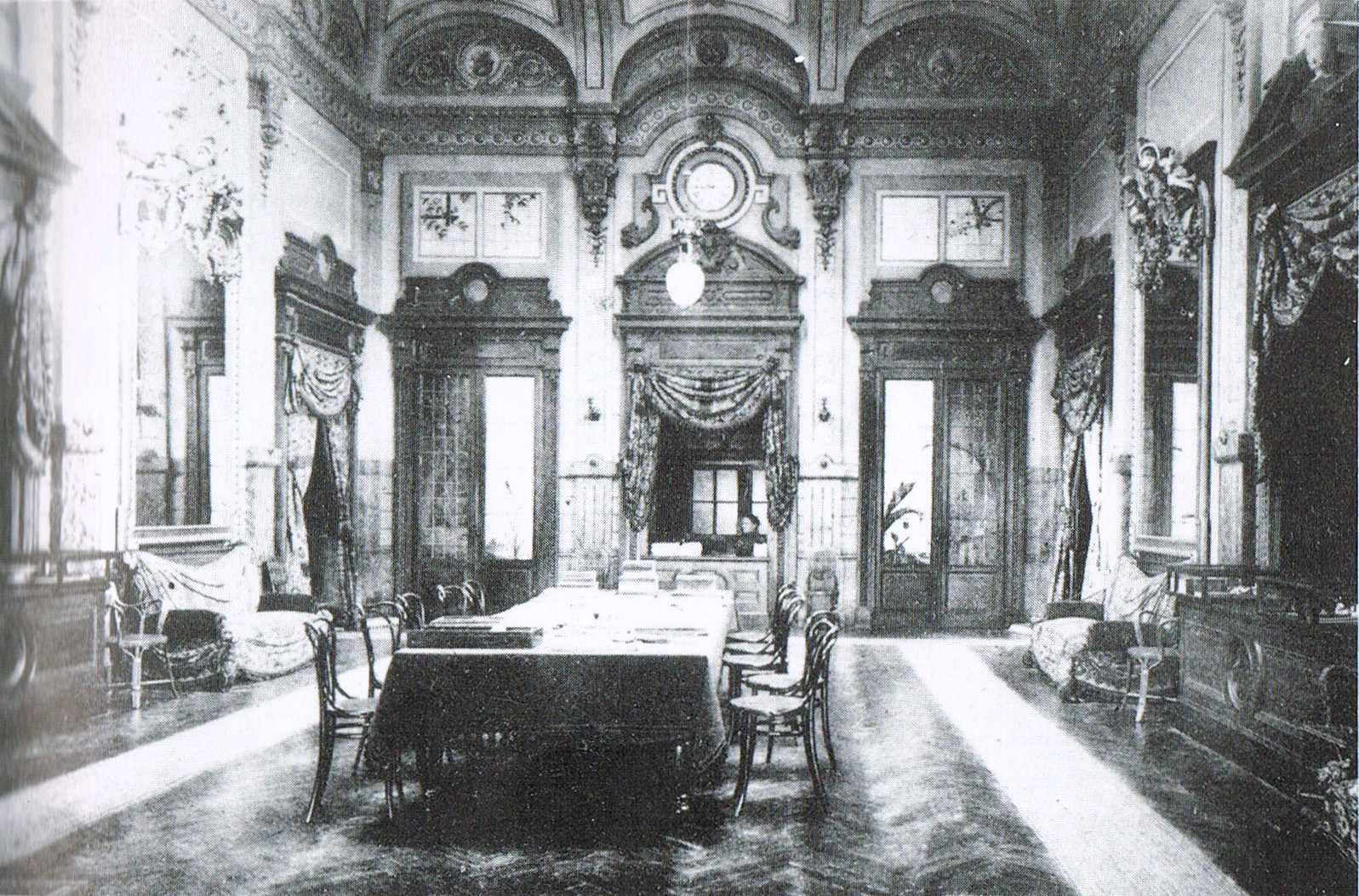
Grand vestibule of the spa.

The foundation stone of the grand hotel was laid on November 1, 1891, followed by a ceremony with speeches from various personalities, including Achille Vialatte, similar to the casino. The thermal establishment was situated to the right of the festivity hall and the casino, with a portico supported by pink Sampans marble columns aligned on a three-step terrace. The structure's four corner pavilions were each topped with a dome and connected by promenades that bathers could stroll through. A central tower concealed the water reservoirs. The main hall was adorned with stained glass, stucco, and paintings and was remarkably well-furnished, offering numerous services, including a pastry shop, newspaper and souvenir counters, a mineral water bar, and a dairy offering Mamirolle milk, kefir, and whey.

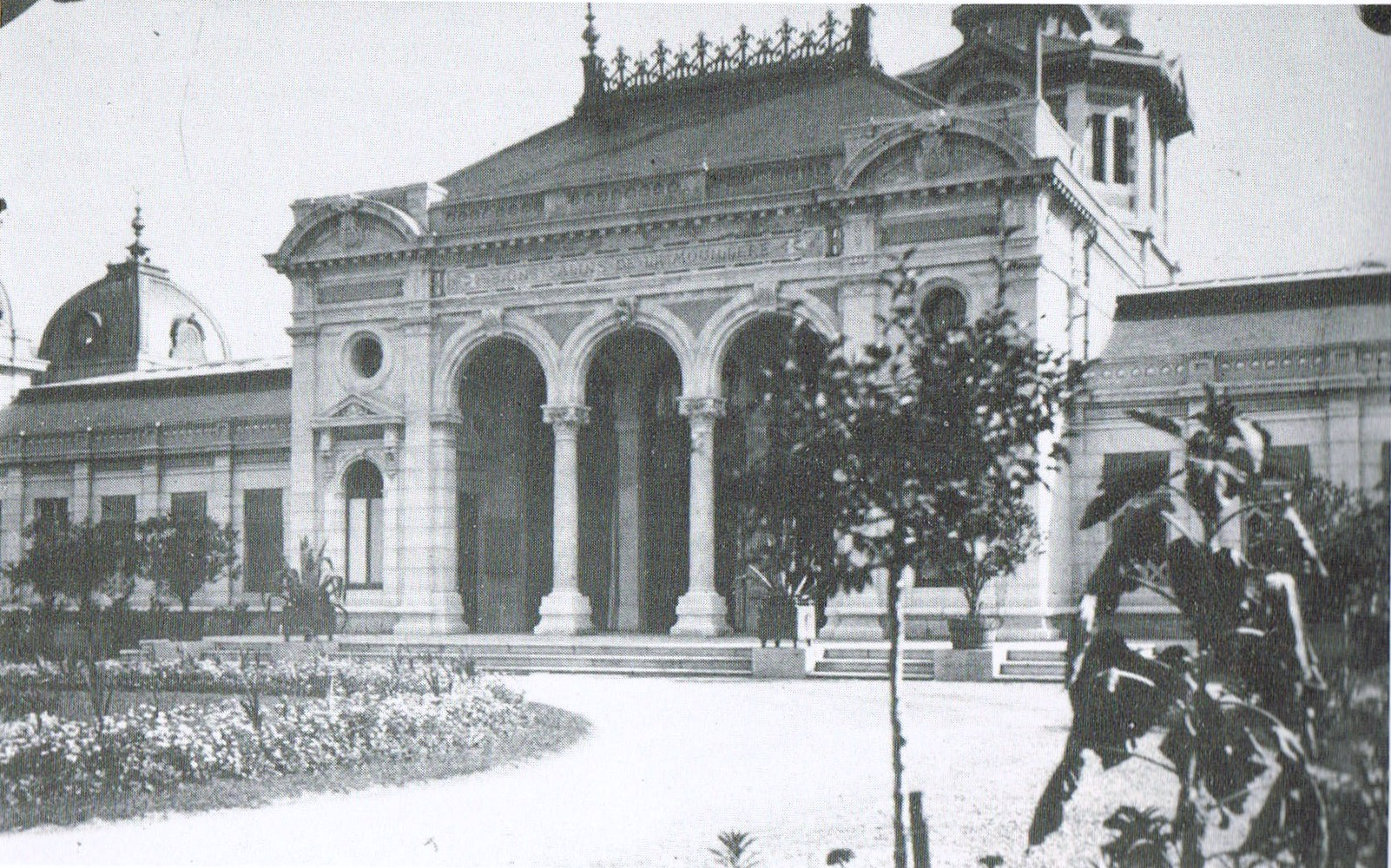
The entrance to the spa.

The baths were furnished with 64 cabins, comprising accommodations ranging from third to first class. The latter were distinguished by the use of brightly colored ceramics and the provision of a salon. Two expansive hydrotherapy facilities were constructed on the premises, comprising steam baths, Russian baths, Moorish baths, a spray room, two medical offices, a gymnastics room, and a room for static, galvanic, and faradic electrotherapy. The facility also included treatment rooms for therapeutic massage, an aerotherapy room, laundry facilities, and technical infrastructure, such as the generator room for heating water, the dynamo room for electricity, and the water tower that supplied the entire station with pressurized water. The thermal establishment was designed to treat patients with lymphatic, scrofulous, primarily bone and joint surgical conditions, numerous nervous and chronic diseases, as well as anemias.

The guides dedicated to the region's thermal stations provided extensive coverage of the numerous purported virtues attributed to the Mouillère waters, whose medical efficacy was demonstrably significant. However, the water supply issue, which had been present since the inception of the thermal activity, appeared to be a concern for the Company. In a satirical piece performed in 1895, Barbizier, a mythical figure from the Battant district, illustrated the situation by addressing the baths. "What is that stovepipe you have on your head?" the baths replied, "It's all that's left of the Miserey pipeline." Barbizier responded, "So, it's a leftover of good conduct!" He was likely exasperated by the fact that the Bisontins preferred the casino to the baths.

=== Hôtel des Bains ===
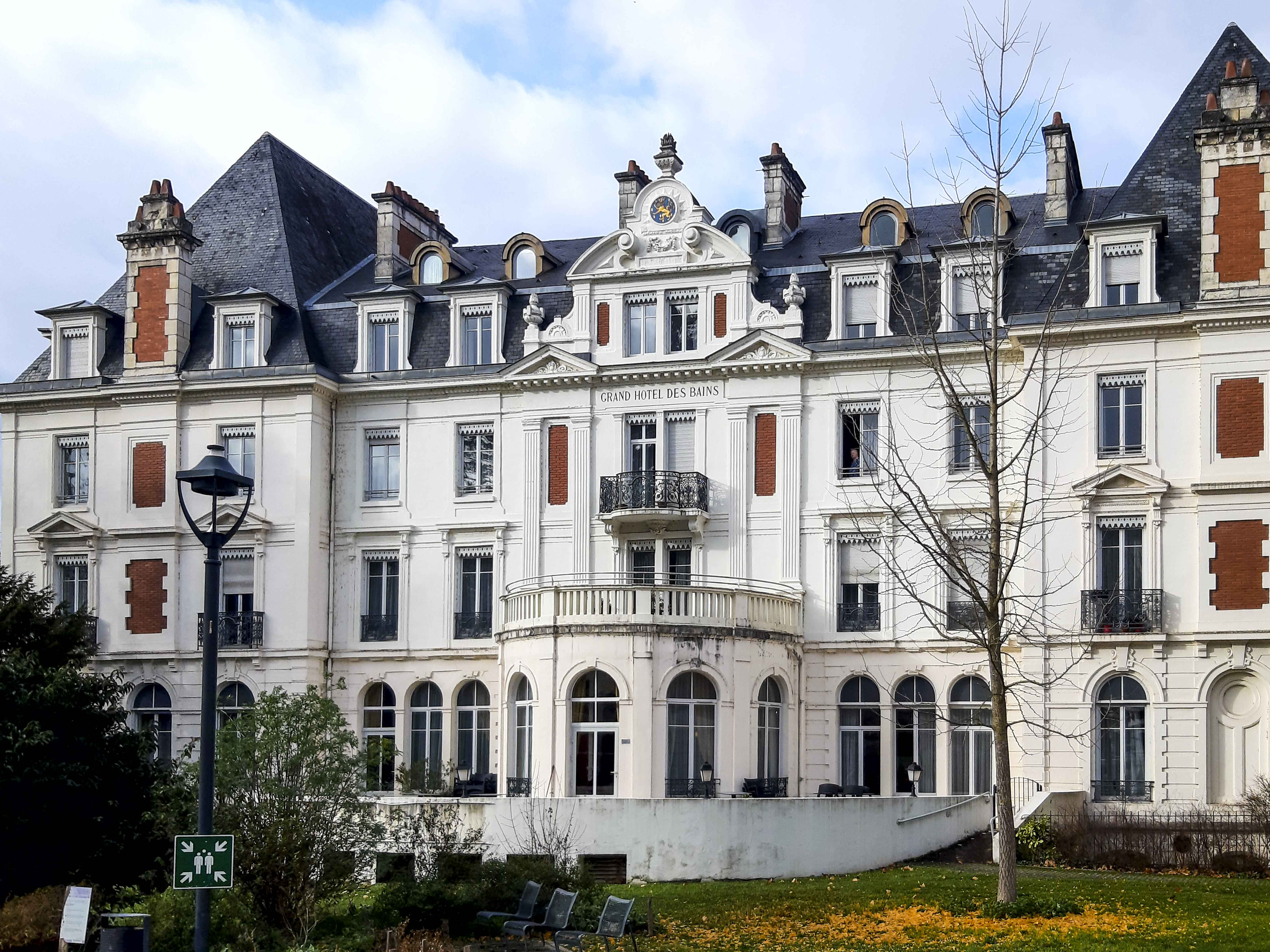
The Hôtel des Bains today.

The Hôtel des Bains constituted the final building within the thermal complex to be formally inaugurated, occurring after 1893. This can be attributed to the challenging process of acquiring the land on which the building was situated. Before its construction, the site was occupied by a Vermont chalet, and the acquisition of the land took an extended period before construction could commence. The hotel was three stories high, covered with large slate roofs, and pierced with numerous windows. It offered a total of 80 rooms, providing maximum comfort and luxury. In 1895, the hotel installed an elevator, an electric lighting network, and a direct telephone line, which were evidence of progress and unparalleled modernity in the Comtois capital. The vast dining room welcomed guests and was so large that it almost rivaled the one in the casino.

The gentlemen were provided with a smoking room in the Moorish style, which offered newspapers and billiards. The ladies were given access to a reading room with a veranda that extended into the gardens. This room was furnished with a piano, music, entertaining magazines, a library, and permanent exhibitions of works by artists from the city or Paris. However, the hotel proved to be of insufficient capacity when considering the press's comments. In 1899, a free information office was opened to direct spa guests to rooms, apartments, or villas for rent. This was despite the existence of a syndicate since 1894 "for the purchase of buildings to be immediately converted into comfortable hotels."

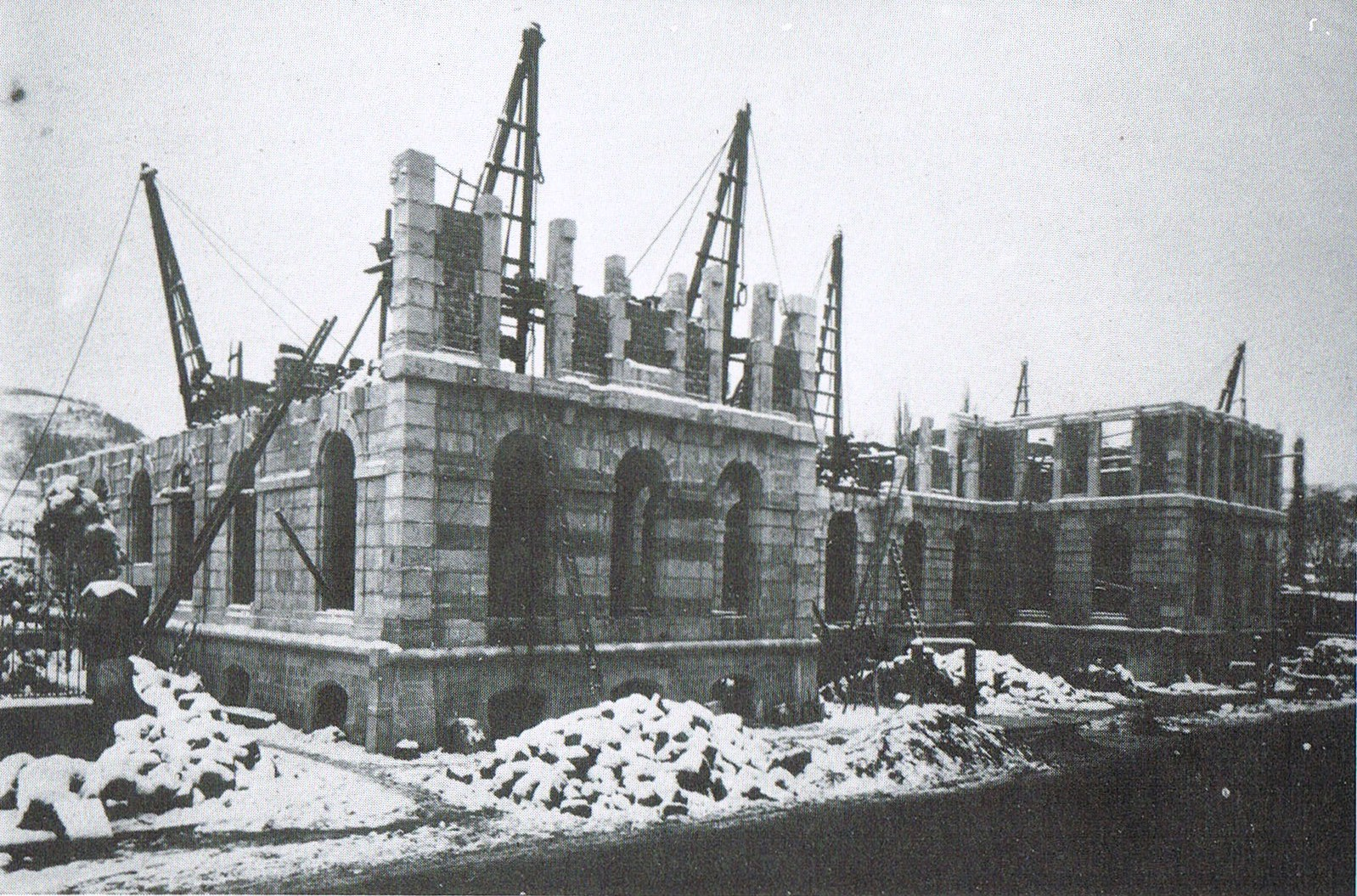
Hôtel des bains, October 1, 1892.

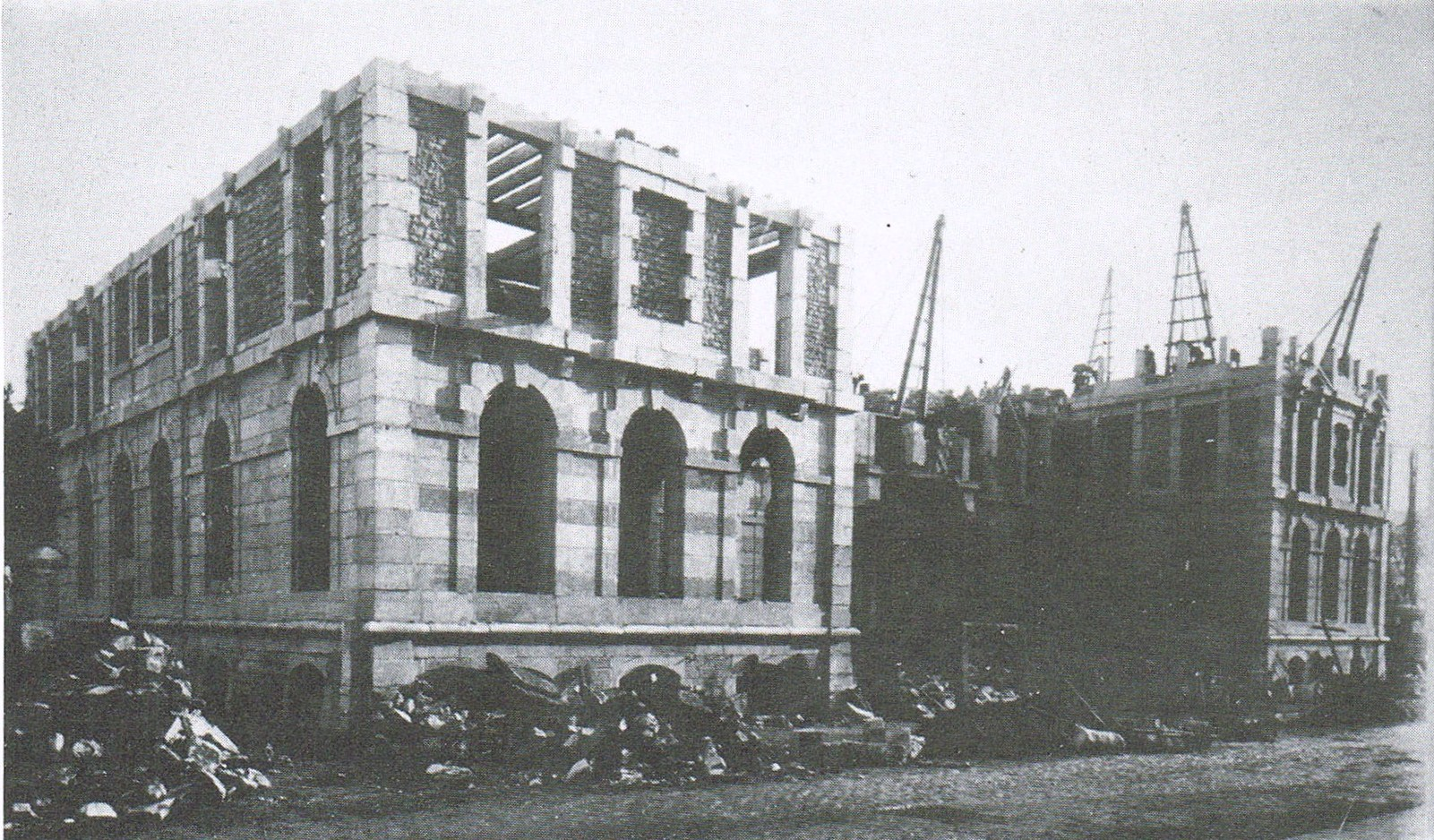
Hôtel des bains, February 3, 1893.

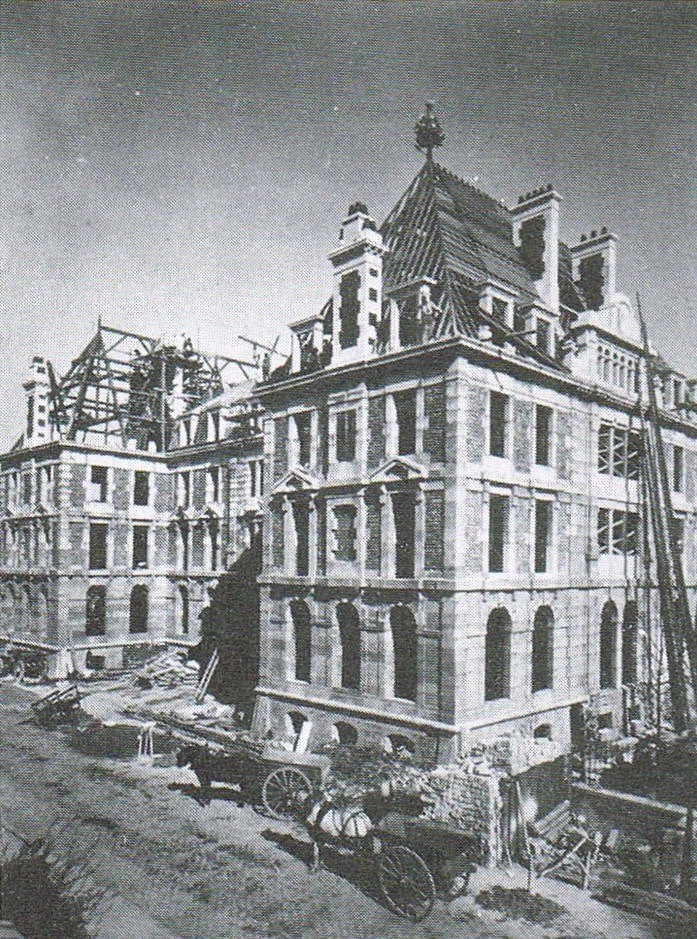
Hôtel des bains, April 5, 1893.

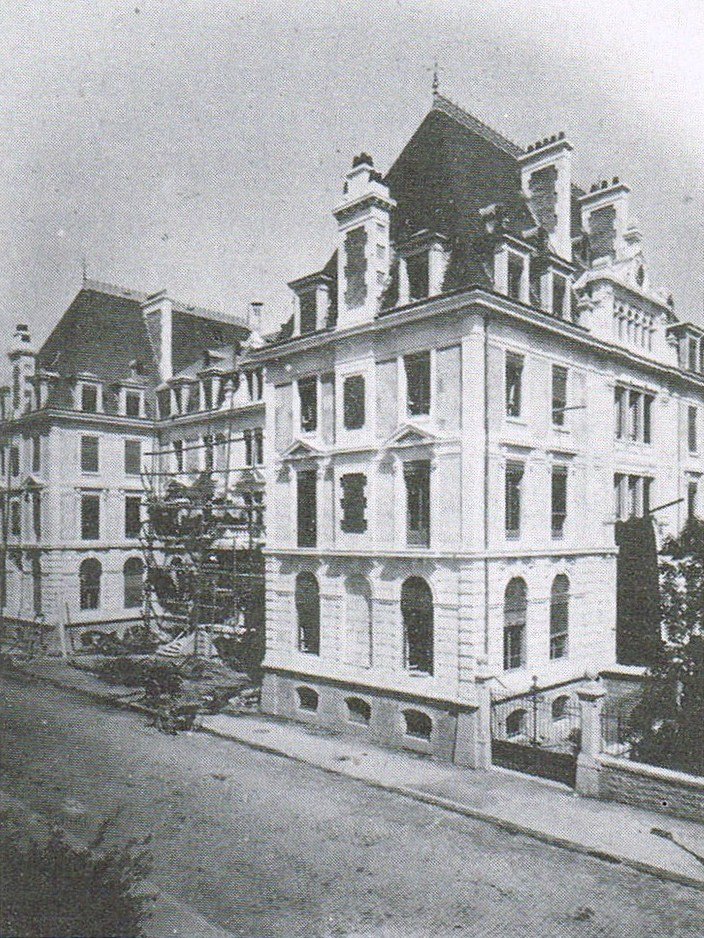
Hôtel des bains, June 6, 1893.

== Kursaal of Besançon ==
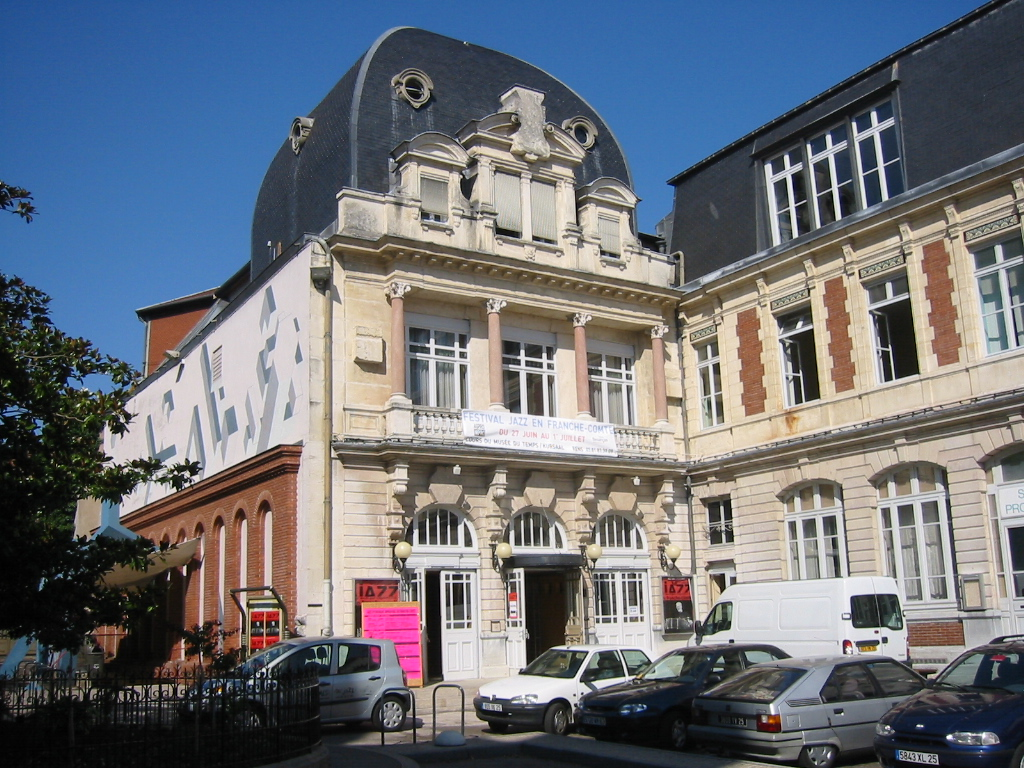
Besançon kursaal.

In 1892, Madame Veuve Pellegrin committed to construct a venue for performances for the benefit of both the guests of the spa and the military personnel stationed in the city. The planned building was to include a hall suitable for a circus (which subsequently became the Grand Kursaal) and a substantial brewery (now the site of the Proudhon Hall). The building was formally inaugurated after 1893. However, the financial burden proved to be insurmountable for Madame Pellegrin, who could not fulfill the obligations associated with the loans that had been secured for the construction of the building. The Kursaal and its associated structures were confiscated, and on March 14, 1895, following a deliberation by the Municipal Council of Besançon, the municipality resolved to purchase the building. Subsequently, the Kursaal of Besançon served as the city's primary venue for festive gatherings for several decades until its closure in 1970 by the municipal authorities due to its advanced state of disrepair. In response to a request from Mayor Robert Schwint, the city undertook a comprehensive renovation of the building in 1979, which included the addition of a conference room in the basement, which would eventually become the Petit Kursaal.

== Bregille funicular ==
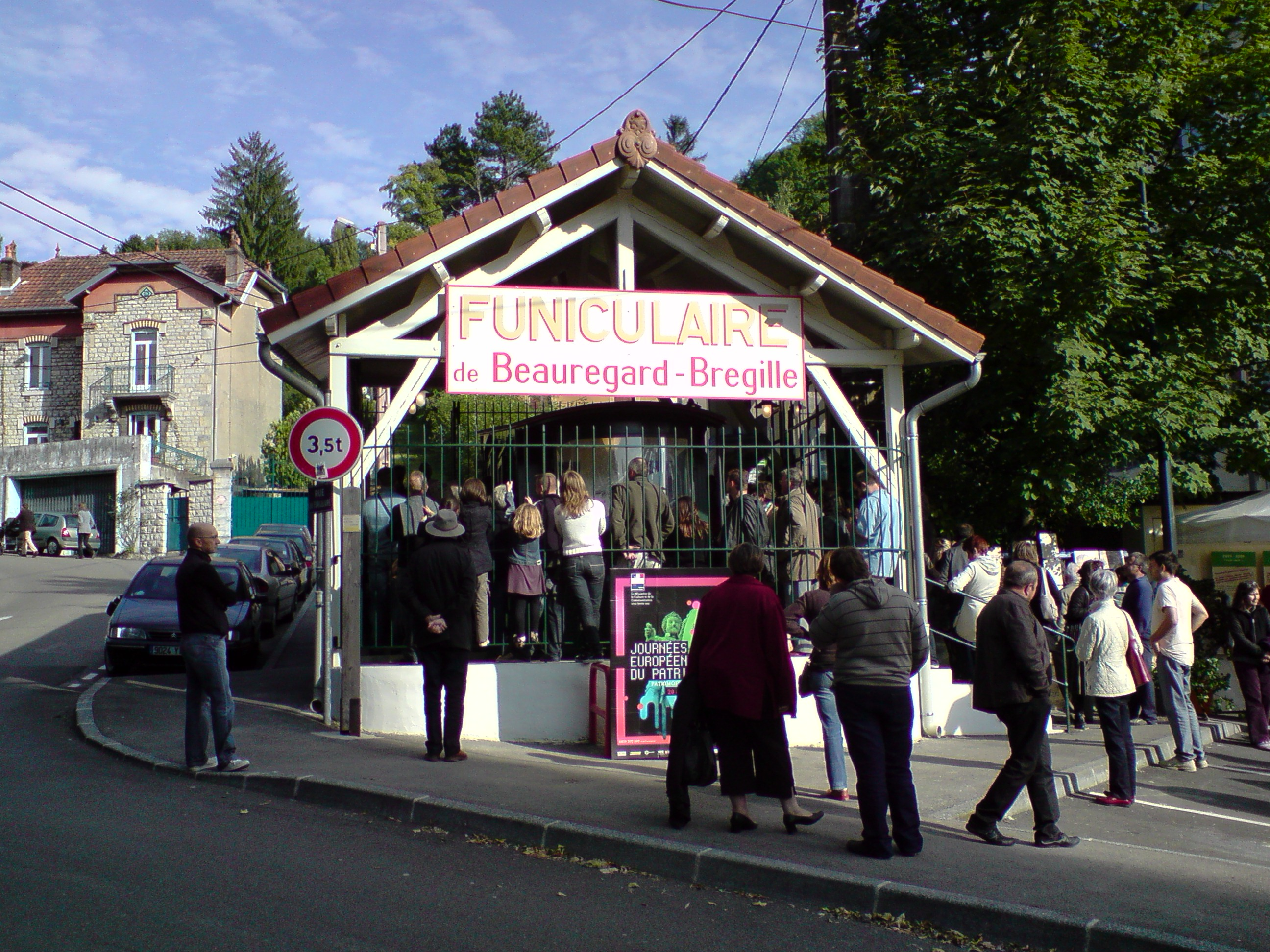
The Bregille funicular, 2008.

The success of the spa resort at the end of the 19th century and the beginning of the 20th century prompted public authorities to reconsider the surrounding area of the Baths, particularly the Bregille plateau, to offer additional facilities. These included hotels, air-cure stations, villas, and apartments. Private initiative was then widely encouraged, and the Society of Medicine of Besançon expressed a wish during its meeting on May 20, 1898:

To establish an agreement between the public authorities, local interest associations, and the baths' board of directors to stimulate, guide, and encourage private initiative with all their might, and to successfully create, near the baths. Furthermore, on the Bregille plateau, the establishment of holiday centers with adequate and practical communication links to the Mouillère and the city would be beneficial, as this would enable bathers to benefit from the combined effects of a saline cure, an air cure, and a medium-altitude cure.

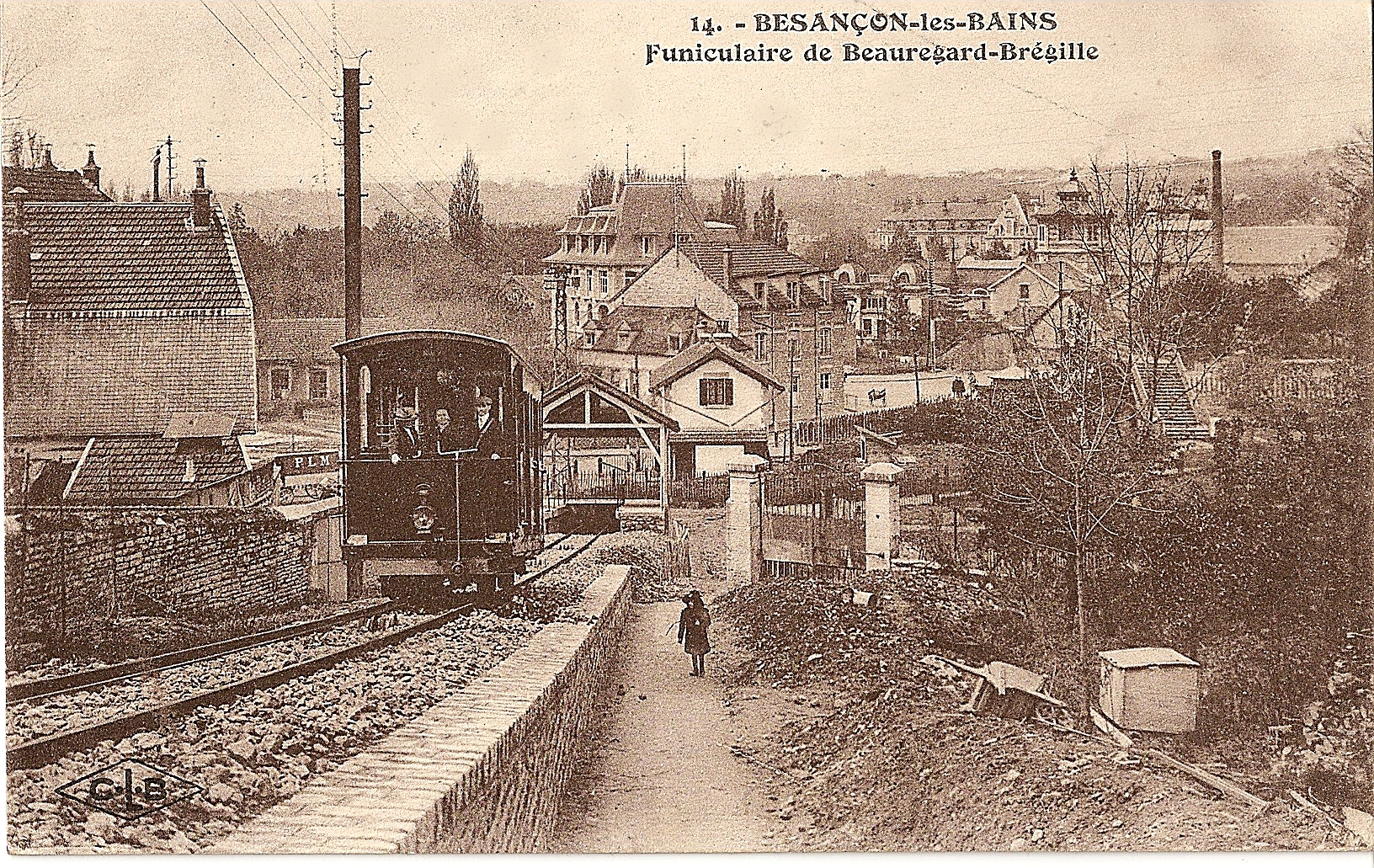
Funicular in 1913.

The directive was thus given: it was necessary to develop the Bregille area and provide it with effective means of communication. Émile Picard, then a wealthy landowner in Bregille and an industrial watchmaker, undertook the construction of a funicular railway, which was completed in 1912. This was somewhat belated, given that the spa activity was in decline and World War I was approaching, yet the funicular operated until 1987.

== The end of Besançon-les-Bains ==
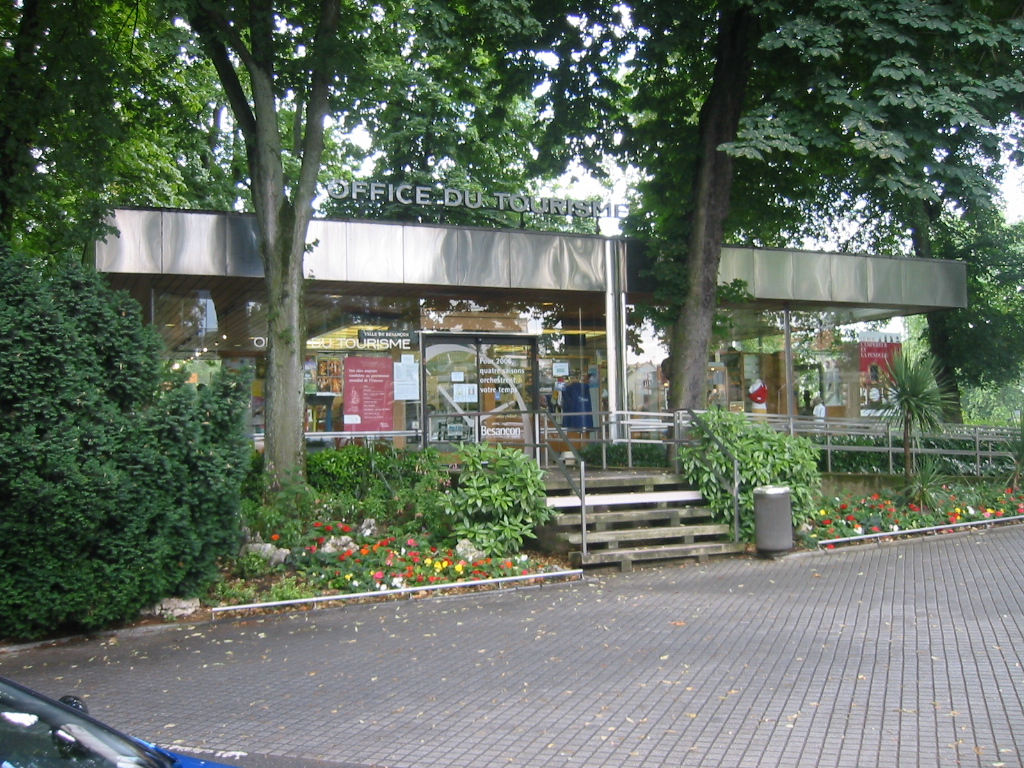
The former Besançon tourist office (until 2020).

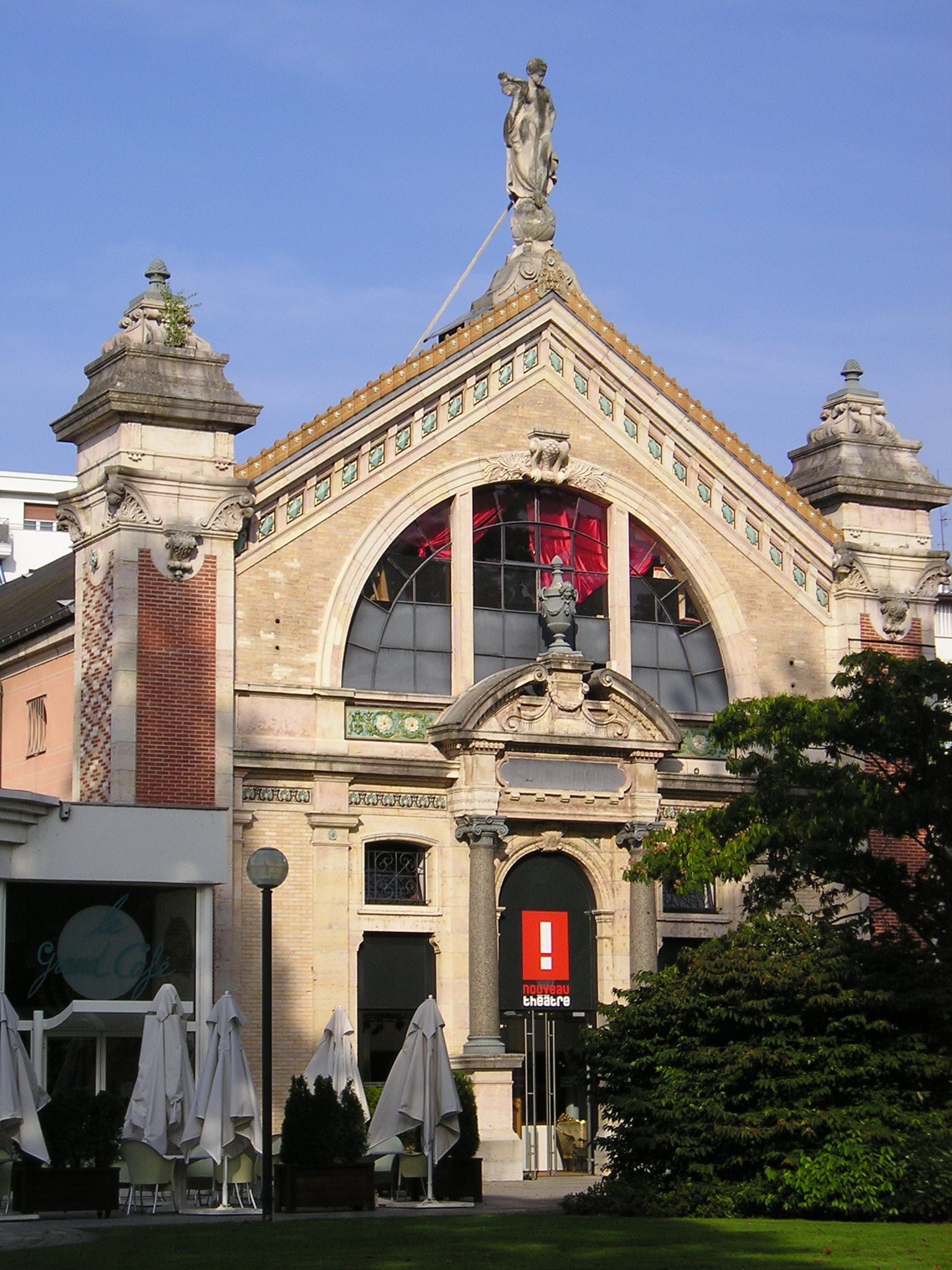
The casino's former party hall, now the Centre dramatique national Besançon Franche-Comté.

Until the advent of the 20th century, the spa establishments of Besançon were experiencing a period of considerable prosperity. The banks of the Doubs River were the site of many grand events, including balls, operettas, cinematograph sessions, more official receptions, and fireworks. During the high season, which ran from May 1 to October 1, the casino was open from 10 a.m. to 7 p.m. and from 8:30 p.m. to 10 p.m. each evening. Concerts were held at the casino every evening at 5 p.m. and 8:30 pm. On Sundays, the traditional children's ball was followed by a snack, then the grand ball and its night party, which were reserved for a wealthier clientele. Music was particularly appreciated at that time, especially following the composition of the Besançon-les-Bains Waltz by the Comtois Verschneider in 1892. The establishment hosted the Bisontin tenor Émile Scaremberg in 1897, and subsequently, a permanent orchestra of 31 musicians was assembled. Diverse festivals and exhibitions were held in the establishment and its surrounding area; the Mouillère was then regarded as the epitome of the city and the region.

However, thermalism began to decline in the 20th century, and the deaths of several prominent figures in the city accelerated the cessation of spa activities. Eugène Savoy, a staunch proponent of the Baths, died in 1901. This was followed in subsequent years by former mayor Delavelle, Léon Pateu, and Charles Sandoz, all three of whom held administrative positions at the Baths. The Grand Hotel employed 18 workers between 1912 and 1913, eight of whom were of foreign origin. The demise of these prominent figures, coupled with a decline in revenue, led to the closure of the Baths, which in turn precipitated the hotel's closure and its subsequent transformation into a retirement home. Subsequently, the spa was abandoned for an extended period and was ultimately demolished to make way for a hotel. Following the conclusion of World War I, the spa activity ceased to exist entirely. The only remaining structures were the tourist office and the casino, despite the latter having undergone numerous modifications over time. The casino's festivity hall was repurposed to house the Centre dramatique national Besançon Franche-Comté, while the tourist office relocated to new premises situated just steps from the former baths in Parc Micaud, where it became the Besançon Tourist Office.

== See also ==
- Timeline of Besançon
- Spa
- List of spa towns in France

== Bibliography ==
- Tonon, Hector; Culot, Jean-François; Henckel, Marie-Édith; Mathieu, Annie; Mathieu, Jacques; Bidalot, Georges; Bévalot, Jacqueline; Broquet, Paul; Monti, Jean-Claude; Porro, Anne; Breton, Jacques; Grappin, Jean-Claude; Bréchat, Pierre-Louis; Mercier, Yves; Riobé, Pierre (2009). Mémoires de Bregille (in French) (2nd ed.). Besançon: Cêtre. ISBN 978-2-87823-196-0.
- Gavignet, Jean-Pierre; Estavoyer, Lyonel (1989). Besançon autrefois (in French). Le Coteau: Horvath. ISBN 2-7171-0685-5.
- Fohlen, Claude (1994a). Histoire de Besançon (in French). Vol. 1. Cêtre. ISBN 2901040217.
- Fohlen, Claude (1994b). Histoire de Besançon (in French). Vol. 2. Cêtre. ISBN 2901040276.
- Clade, Clade (2005). Cours hôtelier de Besançon : histoire d'un lieu hors du commun (in French). Éditions Cabedita. ISBN 2-88295-435-2.
- Clade, Jean-Louis (2003). Médecines et superstitions en Franche-Comté autrefois et dans le Pays de Montbéliard (in French). Éditions Cabedita. ISBN 2-88295-397-6.
