= Basilica of Saint-Ferjeux =

Basilica in Besançon, France

Coordinates: 47°13′58″N 5°59′21″E

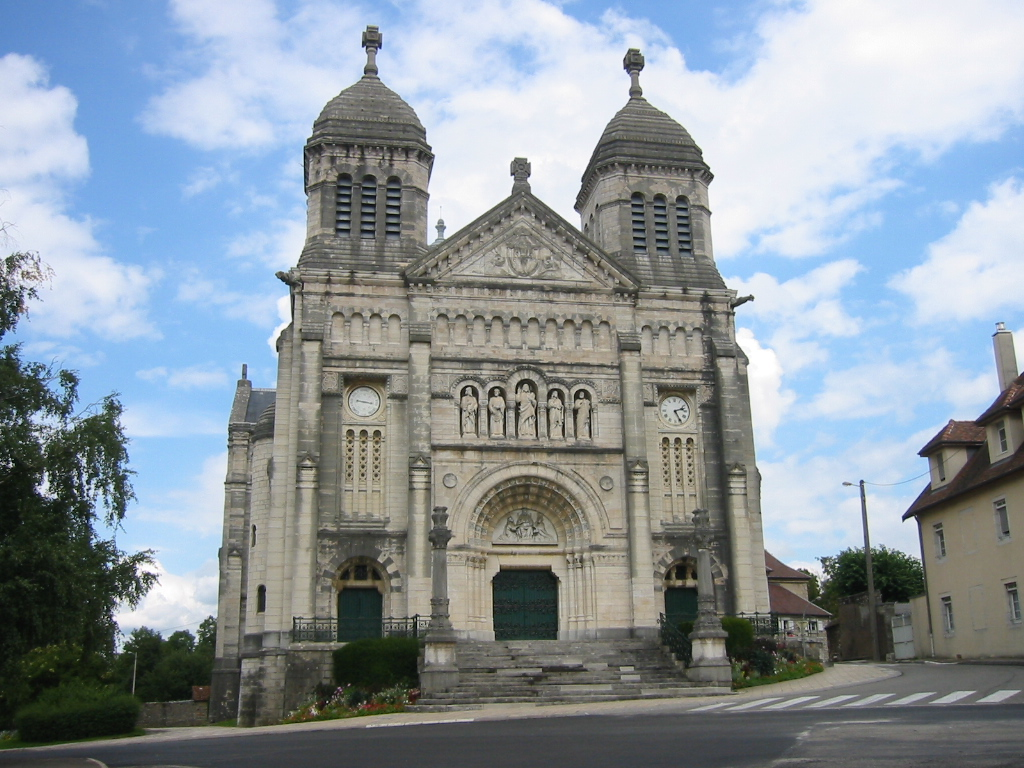
Basilica of St. Ferjeux

The Basilica of St. Ferjeux is an eclectic Romano-Byzantine-style basilica situated in Besançon, in the quartier of Saint-Ferjeux. It is dedicated to the patron saints of Besançon, Ferreolus and Ferrutio (Ferréol et Ferjeux). It honors both their spiritual lineage (the Apostle Saint John, his disciple Saint Polycarp, and Polycarp's disciple Saint Irenaeus, who sent Saints Ferréol and Ferjeux to Sequania) and the great saints who lived in Franche-Comté (Saint Colette, reformer of the Order of the Poor Clares; Saint Jeanne-Antide Touret, founder of the Sisters of Charity).

The basilica has been listed as a historic monument since October 27, 2006.

== Saint Ferjeux and Saint Ferréol ==
Towards the end of the 2nd century, Bishop Saint Irenaeus of Lyon, a disciple of Saint Polycarp of Smyrna, who was himself a disciple of the Apostle John, sent two missionary priests, Saint Ferjeux and his brother Saint Ferréol (originally from Athens, Greece), to found the Catholic Church of Vesontio and evangelize the Gallo-Roman region of Sequania.

They settled in a cave near the site of the basilica, from where they carried out their work. After they reportedly attempted to convert the wife of the Roman governor Claudius, he viewed their Christian activities as a source of public unrest. He had them beheaded on June 10, 212.

Ferjeux and Ferréol became the patron saints of Besançon and are celebrated together on June 16.

== History ==
An earlier church, probably built around 1657, stood on the site of the future basilica. During the Revolution, it was converted into a hospital.

In October 1870, Cardinal Césaire Mathieu invoked the patron saints of the city of Besançon to protect the city from Prussian troops. After the city was spared, he made a solemn vow on January 26, 1871, to erect a new building on the site that local tradition recognized as the cave that had sheltered the two saints. In November 1870, an initial design was submitted free of charge by the Franche-Comté architect Alfred Ducat. Édouard Bérard, a student of Eugène Viollet-le-Duc, was commissioned to design the building. However, as this second design proved too costly, Alfred Ducat's design was ultimately chosen. It remained in the spirit of the architecture of the time, including the architectural style of the Basilica of Notre-Dame de Fourvière in Lyon, the Sacré-Cœur in Montmartre, Paris, and the Cathedral of Sainte-Marie-Majeure in Marseille.

Construction began that same year, and the first mass was celebrated in 1892 in the section that had already been built. The crypt was inaugurated in 1895. In 1898, Alfred Ducat died, and his disciple and collaborator, Joseph Simonin, completed the construction. In 1905, the city of Besançon acquired ownership and responsibility for the building. In 1912, the church was officially elevated to the status of a basilica. The umbraculum and tintinnabulum, located on either side of the transept, are emblems reserved for basilicas. On June 21, 1925, it was finally consecrated, fifty-four years after Cardinal Césaire Mathieu's vow.

== Architecture ==
The basilica is built in the Romano-Byzantine style, and its front facade is flanked by two imposing towers, which house a barometer on the left and a clock on the right. Beneath the choir, the transept, and part of the nave lies a crypt accessible via two staircases located on either side. Five chapels are situated around the apse, and murals created by local artists adorn the large arches of the nave. Pierre Pfister was responsible for the decorative program, inspired by his archeological research in the Roman catacombs.

The dome is adorned with mosaics created by Ulysse Camille Drupt (1876–1968), a series of stained-glass windows crafted by the Gaudin workshop, and sculptures by Just Becquet.

The dome's drum rests on four pendentives, each depicting one of the four evangelists: Matthew, Mark, Luke, and John. The dome depicts Christ facing the heavenly Jerusalem, surrounded by the saints of the diocese.

At the base of the drum, the following Latin inscription can be read: "Passi pro Christo, reliquerunt exemplum ut sequamur vestigia eorum, qui credidimus per verbum eorum in Christum" ("Having suffered for Christ, they left an example so that we might follow in their footsteps, we who have believed in Christ through their word").

In the choir, a frieze above the apse arcades reads "Corpora ipsorum in pace sepulta sunt; in testamento stetit semen horum; ad usque in aeternum manebit" ("Their bodies were buried in peace; their seed remained as a testimony: it will endure for eternity").

== Organs and gallery ==
On the balustrade of the organ loft, the inscription reads: "Laudate Dominum in Sanctis ejus", meaning "Praise the Lord in His saints".

The organ case located in the gallery at the back of the nave comes from an eight-stop instrument built by organ builder Jean-Baptiste Ghys of Dijon (Côte-d'Or) for Father Jules Marquiset, pastor of the parish of Gendrey (Jura).

When he was appointed pastor of the Basilica of Saint Ferréol and Ferjeux in Besançon, he brought with him the organ he owned and had it installed in the gallery. However, the instrument was too weak for the vast basilica, so Jean-Baptiste Ghys added a second manual with ten stops. The young organist and composer Jehan Alain had the opportunity to play the instrument. In 1930, the organ builder Jules Bossier of Dijon added a third positive manual with ten new stops. Jehan Alain was then asked to give his opinion on the nomenclature of these stops, in a neo-classical search for timbres to enable him to bring his musical concepts to life, and he inaugurated this enlarged and renovated organ on June 10, 1932. In 1949, the workshop of Edmond Alexandre Roethinger in Schiltigheim (Bas-Rhin) carried out a complete overhaul of the organ, without altering its composition.

In 1983, the Association for the Friends of the Organs of Saint-Ferjeux was founded. In 1988, Jean-Marc Cicchero of Gentilly (Val-de-Marne) carried out a complete restoration of the organ. It was on this instrument at the Basilica of Saint-Ferréol and Saint-Ferjeux that Marie-Claire Alain recorded the second complete collection of her brother Jehan Alain's organ works in 2000. In 2015, the third manual was reinforced, and the motor was replaced in 2019.

== Burials ==
- Saints Ferreolus and Ferrutio
