= Émile Scaremberg =

French opera singer

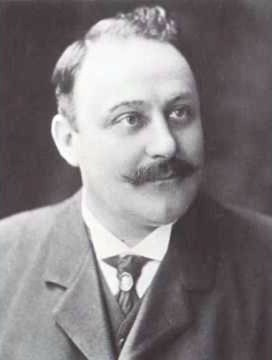
- Émile Scaremberg (unknown date)
- Born: 26 April 1863; Besançon, France
- Died: 26 February 1938 (aged 74); Besançon
- Occupations: Opera singer (Tenor); Music educator

Émile Scaremberg (26 April 1863 – 26 February 1938) was a French tenor.

== Biography ==
Scaremberg (sometime spelled Scaramberg) was born in Besançon in Franche-Comté. After studying in Paris, he took singing lessons in the Comtoise capital with a tenor known as Perrin and continued his studies with Charles Nicot (1843–1899). Scaremberg made his début at the Théâtre national de l'Opéra-Comique in April 1893 in Grétry's "Richard Coeur-de-Lion" and stayed with the company for two years. He also began to appear in opera houses in the cities of Bordeaux, Lyon (where he sang Werther), Marseille, Nantes, Nice and Vichy and, in 1894, he sang Turiddu in Monte-Carlo. He is included in one of the greatest compilation of classical singing, The EMI Record of Singing. Scaremberg also performed in 1897 à the hotel of Besançon-les-Bains, in Roméo et Juliette, la Favorite as well as in Lakmé. He participated in many performances, as in London and Belgium, before sudden vocal difficulties forced him to return to Besançon to teach singing.

He died 26 February 1938 in his hometown and was buried in the cimetière des Chaprais.
