= Just Becquet =

French sculptor (1829–1907)

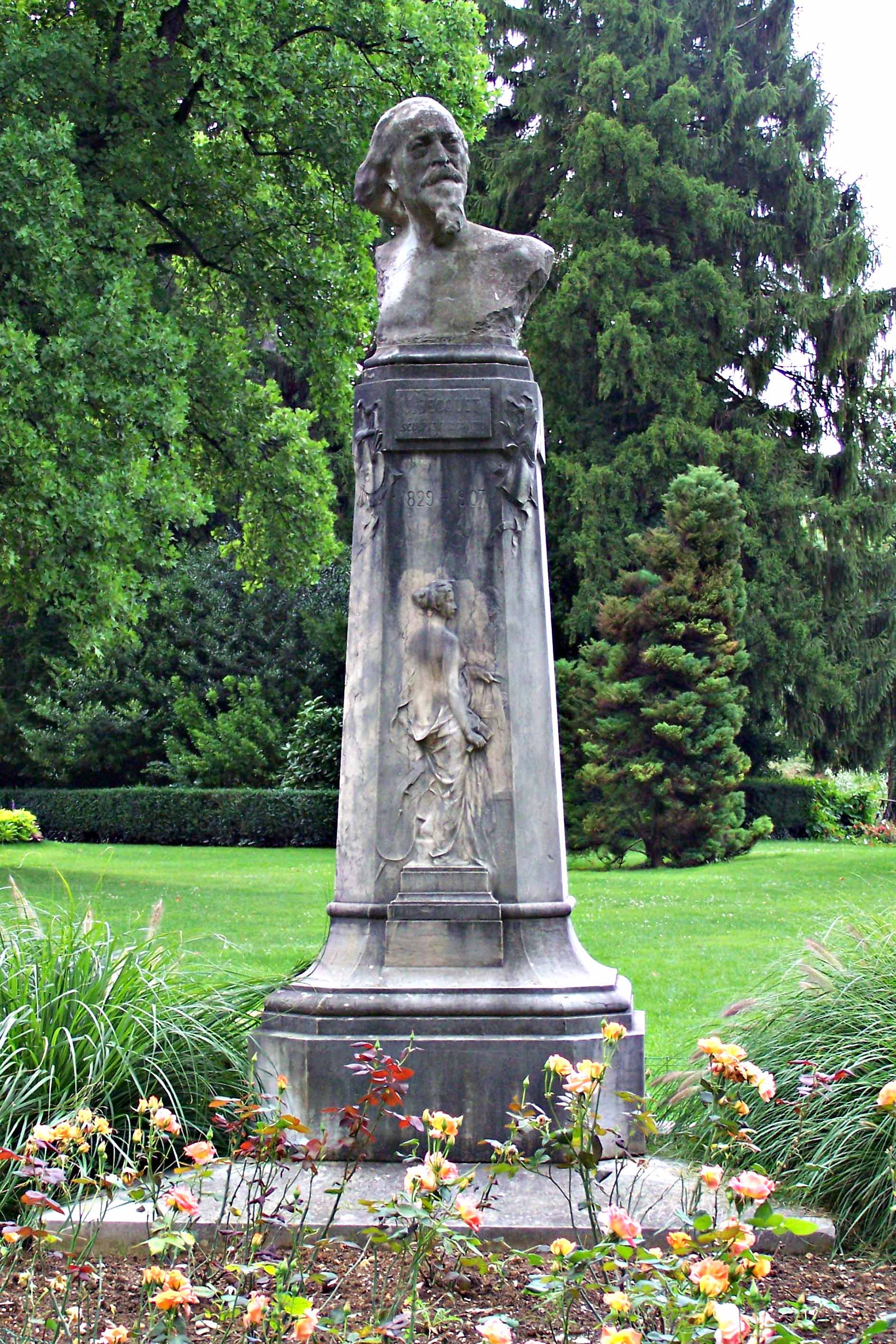
- Bust of Just Becquet by Henri-Léon Gréber
- Born: Just André François Becquet; 17 July 1829; Besançon, Doubs, Franche-Comté, France
- Died: 25 February 1907 (aged 77); Paris, France
- Occupation: Sculptor
- Known for: Sculpture
- Awards: Knight of the Legion of Honour (1878); Officer of the Legion of Honour (1898)

Just Becquet (17 July 1829 – 25 February 1907) was a French sculptor and musician. Born in Besançon, he was a pupil of François Rude and active in Paris, France during the 19th century.

== Early life and education ==
Just André François Becquet was born on 17 July 1829 in Besançon, Doubs, Franche-Comté, France.

As a child, Becquet demonstrated an early artistic inclination by playfully peeling off the putty from recently fixed windows and sculpting miniature human figures. Becquet later pursued studies in drawing and modeling at the municipal Fine Arts school. Around 1850, he moved to Paris to study with François Rude, a leading French sculptor, after crossing paths with his students Paul Franceschi and Jules Franceschi in Besançon.

== Career ==
The French sculptor became a regular exhibitor at the Paris Salon held by the Académie des Beaux-Arts in 1853 and executed numerous busts and other works. At the Salon of 1857, his piece titled "Faune" and its bold realism earned praise from critics. In the sculpture section of the 1858 Paris Salon, the pupil of François Rude presented a sculptural piece made from plaster titled "Saint Sébastien". Later, it found its place within the crypt of the Basilica of Saint-Ferjeux.

Becquet, an excellent cellist and passionate about music, dedicated all his free time from sculpture to it, idolizing Beethoven. His cello talent allowed him to supplement his father's pension by performing at concerts, where he met Camillo Sivori, the Italian virtuoso, who played music with him for many years. He was also a musician at the Théâtre Français, where he enjoyed classical theater. In the late 1850s, he became a friend of American painter James McNeill Whistler during his bohemian Paris days. In 1859, Whistler etched a portrait of Becquet holding the cello, which was first sold by Francis Seymour Haden.

Becquet created an allegorical statue representing the Doubs which he showcased at the 1861 Salon in Paris. In 1864, "Le Doubs," sculpted by the Besançon sculptor, was placed at the Granvelle Palace (French: Palais Granvelle) in Besançon to enhance the landscape. Becquet created a marble bust titled "Good Woman from Franche-Comté" (French: Bonne femme de la Franche-Comté) which was presented at the 1865 Paris Salon. The piece was a half-length bust of a peasant woman. In 1866, Becquet finalized his statue of Pierre-Joseph Proudhon, which debuted at the 1867 Paris Salon.

He submitted two pieces for the 1869 Paris Salon, which were displayed at the Palais des Champs-Élysées on 1 May 1869. The pieces included a plaster statue titled "Grape Harvesters" (French: Vendangeurs) and a portrait of Mme B. as a terracotta bust. He was awarded with a medal for his contribution to the 'Sculptors and Engravors of Medals or Fine Stones' category. At the following Salon in 1870, Becquet also won a medal. At the Salon of 1872, he notably contributed a bust of French philosopher Victor Cousin. He displayed a marble statue under the title of "Ismaël" at the 1877 Paris Salon, which was subsequently featured in L'Artiste. The piece depicting Ishmael suffering from hunger and thirst received a first-class medal from the awards jury. He also exhibited the piece at the Exposition Universelle of 1878. Earning a second-class medal at the exhibition, Becquet was distinguished as a Knight of the Legion of Honor that year.

On 27 June 1878, he was elected as a corresponding member of the Academy of Sciences, Literature and Arts of Besançon (Académie des sciences, belles-lettres et arts de Besançon).

Just Becquet designed a statue of Col. Denfert-Rochereau which was unveiled on 21 September 1879 in Montbéliard. The piece was cast in bronze by Jules Graux using metal from cannons taken by Denfert-Rochereau from Belfort after its surrender to France. The 7-meter monument, with a pedestal designed by Saint Ginest and executed by Armand Bloch, was placed at the city's largest square, Place d'Armes.

He designed a statue of the engineer Germain Sommeiller of Saint-Jeoire, with the plaster model displayed at the 1880 Paris Salon. Becquet also presented a sculpture titled "Faun Playing with a Panther" (French: Faune jouant avec une panthère) at the Paris Salon of 1880 and the Tours Fine Arts Exhibition of 1881. Inscribed on the artwork's round base were the words 'To the memory of Rude,' signed by Becquet. The sculpture depicted a faun, resting on a mound of vine leaves, interacting with a panther at his feet. One of his best-known works, it was purchased by the French government for the museum at Tours. In 1889, he showcased "Faun Playing with a Panther" at the Exposition Universelle.

Becquet took over an unfinished statue of Martin of Tours, "Saint Martin," that Paul Cabet started in the mid-1870s, finishing it in 1882 after Cabet's death. The statue was later placed in Arras Cathedral.

A marble version of his "Saint Sébastien" statue was introduced in 1884 and later acquired by the government for the Luxembourg Museum. The Paris Salon of 1886 displayed his fine marble work known as the "Apology of the French Vine" (French: Apologie de la vigne française). The sculpture portrayed a young faun seated on a stone, crowned with vine branches and holding a bunch of grapes. It was also purchased by the government and placed in Luxembourg and later moved to the Tuileries Garden. The 1887 Paris Salon featured "Christ on the Cross," which was eventually placed in the Musée d'Art et d'Histoire de Saint-Brieuc. In 1888, Becquet exhibited the plaster bust of his mentor François Rude. A year later, he won a silver medal at the Universal Exhibition of 1889 and presented "Sister Marthe," a plaster bust later cast in bronze for the façade of Besançon's Saint Jacques Hospital (Hôpital Saint-Jacques). The Government-commissioned marble bust of Rude, later displayed in the Louvre Museum's gallery of portraits of the masters, was showcased in 1891.

By 1891, he had been admitted into the Society of History and Archaeology of Old Montmartre (French: Société d'Histoire et d'Archéologie Le Vieux Montmartre). On the 10th of April, the hall of Rocher Suisse hosted over 100 guests. Becquet, showcasing equal skill with the cello and his sculpting tools, entertained the audience by playing sonatas followed by a duo concertante piece.

The music-loving sculptor exhibited "The Voice of the Cello" (French: Voix du violoncelle) at the Salon of 1893 in Paris. The piece portrayed a nude female figure standing while performing on a cello.

In November 1894, he was working on the model for a statue to symbolize Numismatics, commissioned by the Minister of Fine Arts for the decoration of the National Library's main hall. It was one of four statues intended to symbolize the various departments of the National Library. Material, Manuscripts, Prints, and Medals made up the four departments. The marble statue by Becquet portrayed a subtly draped female figure representing the engraving aspect of medals. Becquet's work, along with three other allegorical statues, was installed in January 1897 under the large vestibule of the National Library's main courtyard.

Becquet's marble statue entitled "La Numismatique" for the National Library was featured at the Paris Salon of 1897, in addition to the pieces "Saint Sebastien (of Luxembourg)" and "Christ on the Cross". He was honored with the rank of Officer of the Legion of Honor in 1898.

He entered the "Virgin of Saint Ferjeux" at the Salon in 1900, the same year his entries to the Universal Exhibition earned him a gold medal. Becquet exhibited the marble "Apotheosis of Victor Hugo," commissioned by the city of Besançon, in 1902. In 1903, he produced a terracotta bust of Saint Ferréol, a patron saint of Besançon.

In 1904, the French sculptor who had been exhibiting for over 50 years, won a medal for his work "Joseph in Egypt". His 1904 piece, "Christ at the Tomb," earned him the salon's coveted medal of honor, awarded by his artistic peers at the competition. His last exhibited work at the 1906 Salon was a terracotta portrait, designed to echo the sculptural style of Honoré Daumier.

== Death ==
Just Becquet died on 25 February 1907 in Paris, France.

== Legacy ==
In his hometown of Besançon, the street "Rue Just Becquet" is named after him. After his death, a committee organized a public subscription to erect a bust in his memory, later placed at the entrance of Besançon's Parc Micaud.

== Works ==
- Ismaël
- L'Abîme
- Joseph en Egypte
- François Rude (bust)
- Apologie de la Vigne
- Faune
- Vendangeur
- La Numismatique
- Saint Sébastien
- Christ on the Cross
- Bonne femme de la Franche-Comté
- Sœur Marthe
- La Voix du Violoncelle
- La source
- Honoré Chapuis (bust)
- Source d'Arcier
- Étude de lion
- La Bruyère

== Gallery ==
Works by Just Becquet

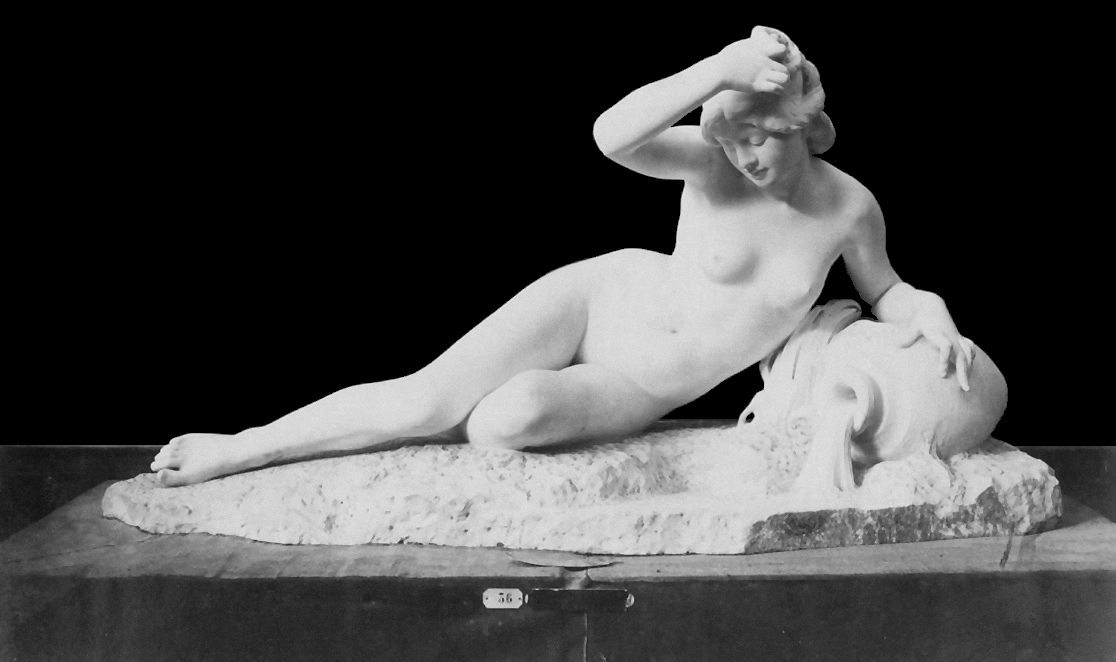
La Seine à sa Source (1900)

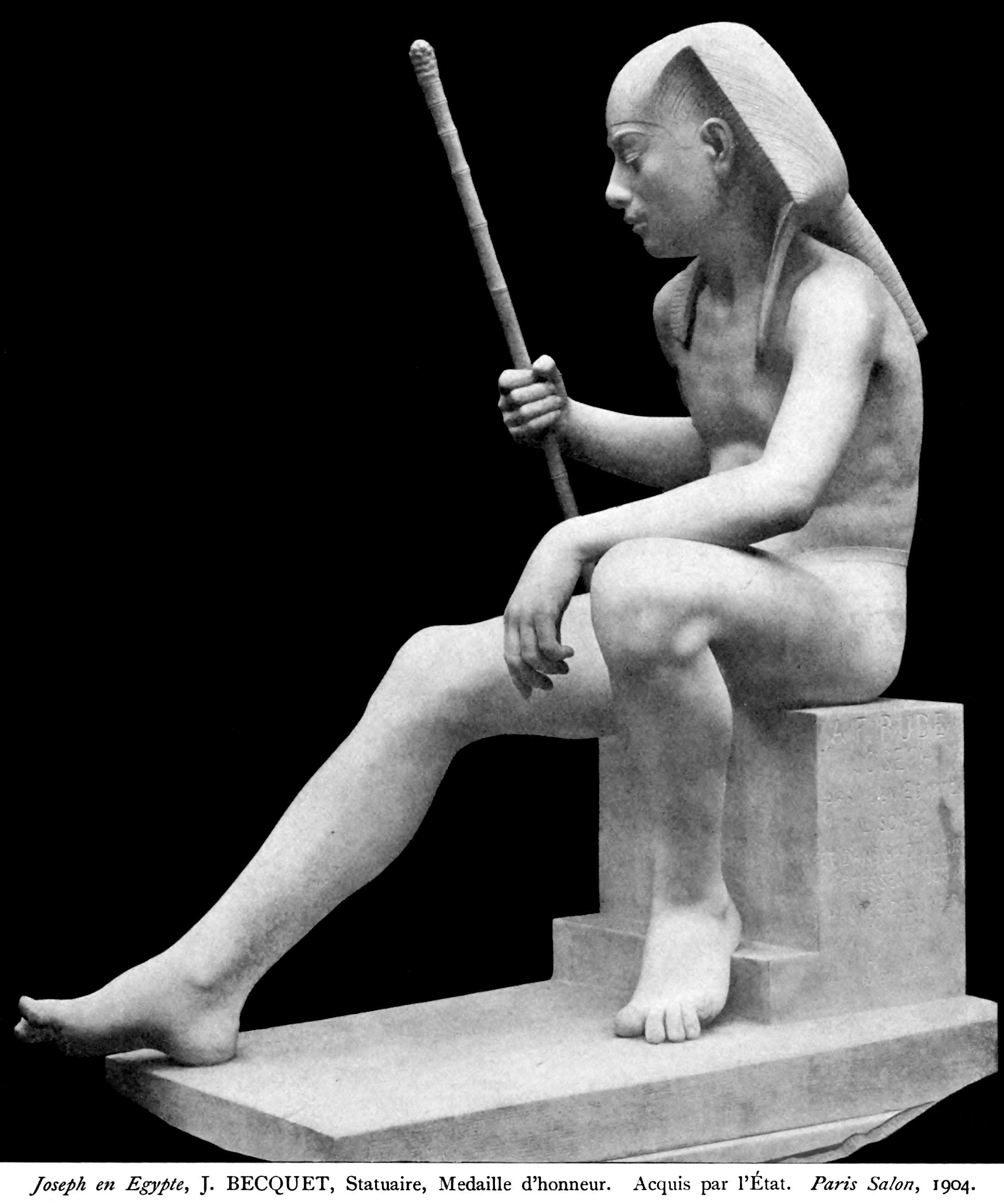
Joseph in Egypt (1904)
