= Ferreolus and Ferrutio =

Saint Ferreolus and Ferrutio
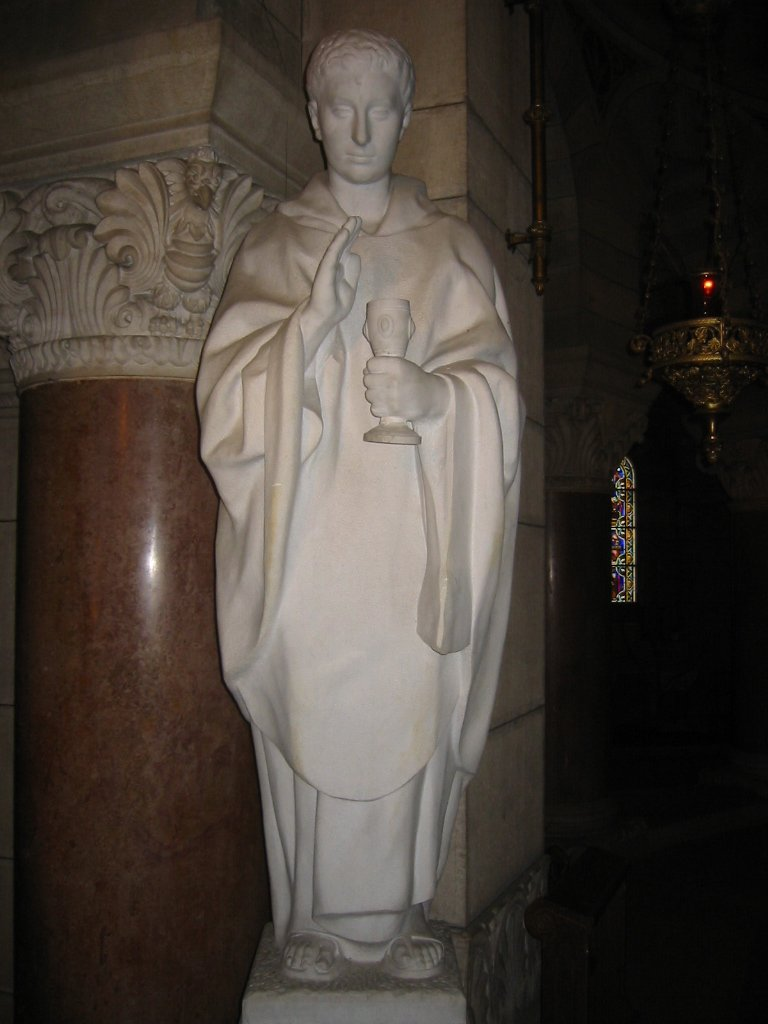
- Statue of Ferreolus of Besançon. Basilique Saint-Ferjeux, near Besançon.
- Died: ~AD 212
- Venerated in: Roman Catholic Church, Eastern Orthodox Church
- Major shrine: Basilica of Saint-Ferjeux
- Feast: 16 June
- Patronage: Besançon

Saints Ferreolus and Ferrutio (or Fargeau and Ferrutius; French: Ferréol et Ferjeux; Italian: Ferreolo e Ferruccio) (died ca. AD 212) are venerated as martyrs and saints by the Catholic Church, especially in Besançon where they are honored as its patron saints.

== History ==
Their legendary acts state that they were brothers converted to Christianity by Saint Polycarp. They were ordained as priest and deacon, respectively, by Saint Irenaeus of Lyons. They were sent to the area around Besançon as missionaries. They are called natives of Asia Minor; Alban Butler held it "more probable that they were natives of Gaul who had studied in Asia Minor and come under Christian influence." After working as missionaries amongst the Sequani for 30 years, in AD 212 during the persecution of Alexander Severus, they were arrested, tortured and beheaded.

While aspects of their legend may not be entirely historical, it was likely based on someone named Ferreolus who assisted Irenaeus in spreading Christianity beyond Lyon.

== Veneration ==
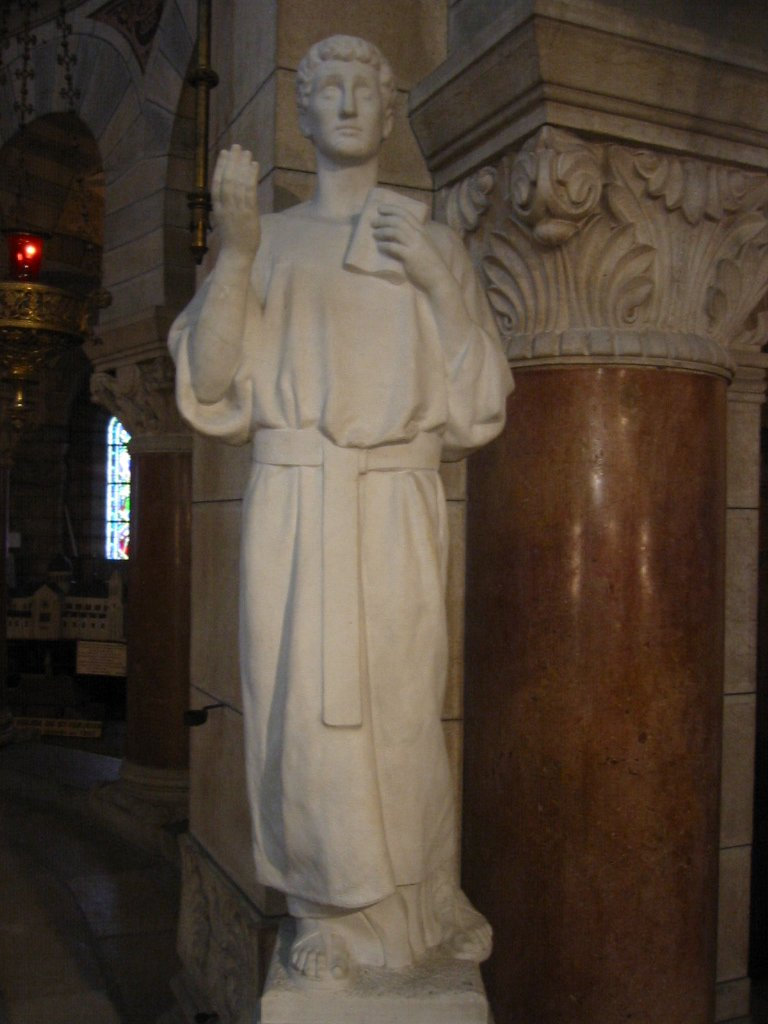
Statue of Ferrutio of Besançon. Basilique Saint-Ferjeux, near Besançon.

According to their legend, their relics were discovered in a cave near Besançon in AD 370 by a military tribune whose dog was chasing a fox. The relics were enshrined by Bishop Anianus of Besançon in the 4th century AD. Saint Gregory of Tours writes that miracles were attributed to their relics in his time; he says that his brother-in-law was cured of a dangerous distemper at the saints' intercession. The Missale Gothicum (ca. AD 700) contains a full proper of the Mass in their honor. In the sixteenth century, they were invoked in Besançon against sickness, along with Saint Sebastian and Saint Roch.

Ferreolus appears in a catalogue of the 17th century as a bishop of Besançon, but the liturgy of Besançon has always remembered Ferreolus as a priest, and Ferrutio as a deacon. Ferreolus and Ferrutio, as patrons of Besançon, are considered to have appeared on the city walls in times of danger. The two saints have been represented in stained glass, paintings, and statues in many churches and chapels in the two dioceses of the Franche-Comté: Saint-Claude and Besançon.

The Basilique Saint-Ferjeux is situated in the neighborhood of Saint-Ferjeux, Besançon.

They are depicted on a French lantern slide dating from AD 1900.

== Butler's account ==
The hagiographer Alban Butler (1710–1773) wrote in his Lives of the Fathers, Martyrs, and Other Principal Saints, under 16 June,

SS. Ferreolus, or Fargeau, a Priest, and Ferrutius, a Deacon, MM. They were ordained by Saint Irenæus, and sent by him to preach the gospel at Besançon, where, after suffering many torments, they were beheaded for the faith in the persecution of Severus in 211 or 212. Saint Gregory of Tours says, that their relics were glorified by miracles in his time, and that his brother-in-law was cured by them of a dangerous distemper. They are at this day esteemed the great treasure of the cathedral of Besançon.

== Gallery ==
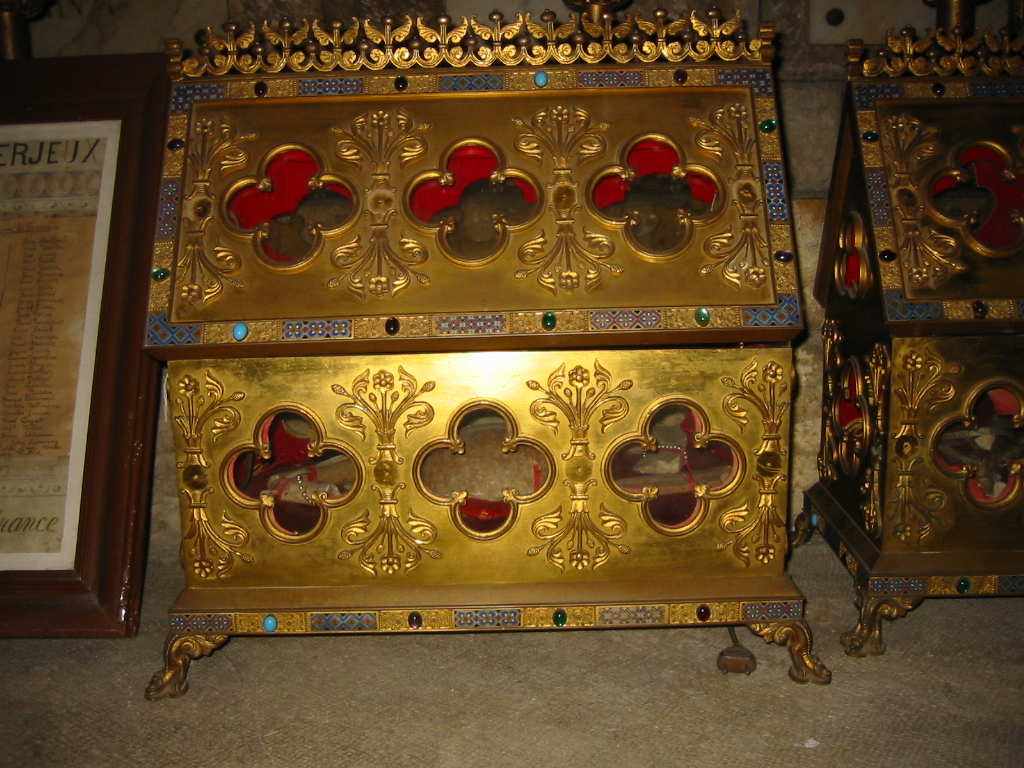
Reliquaire de Saint Ferrutio. Crypte de la basilique Saint Ferjeux de Besançon.

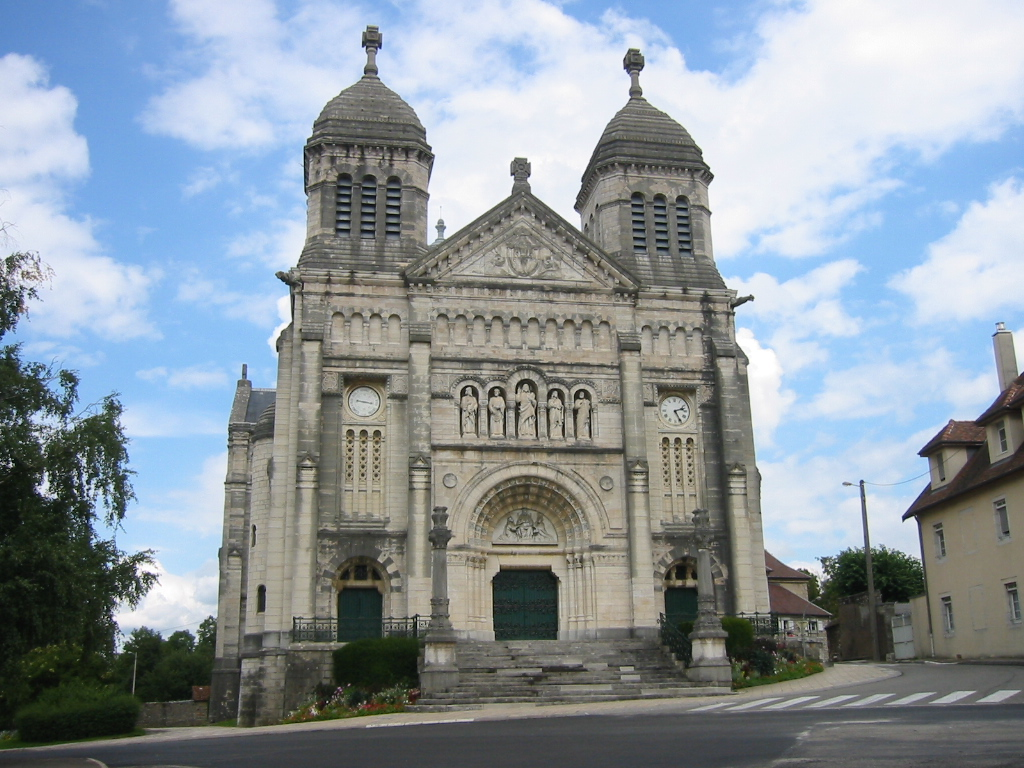
Basilique Saint-Ferjeux

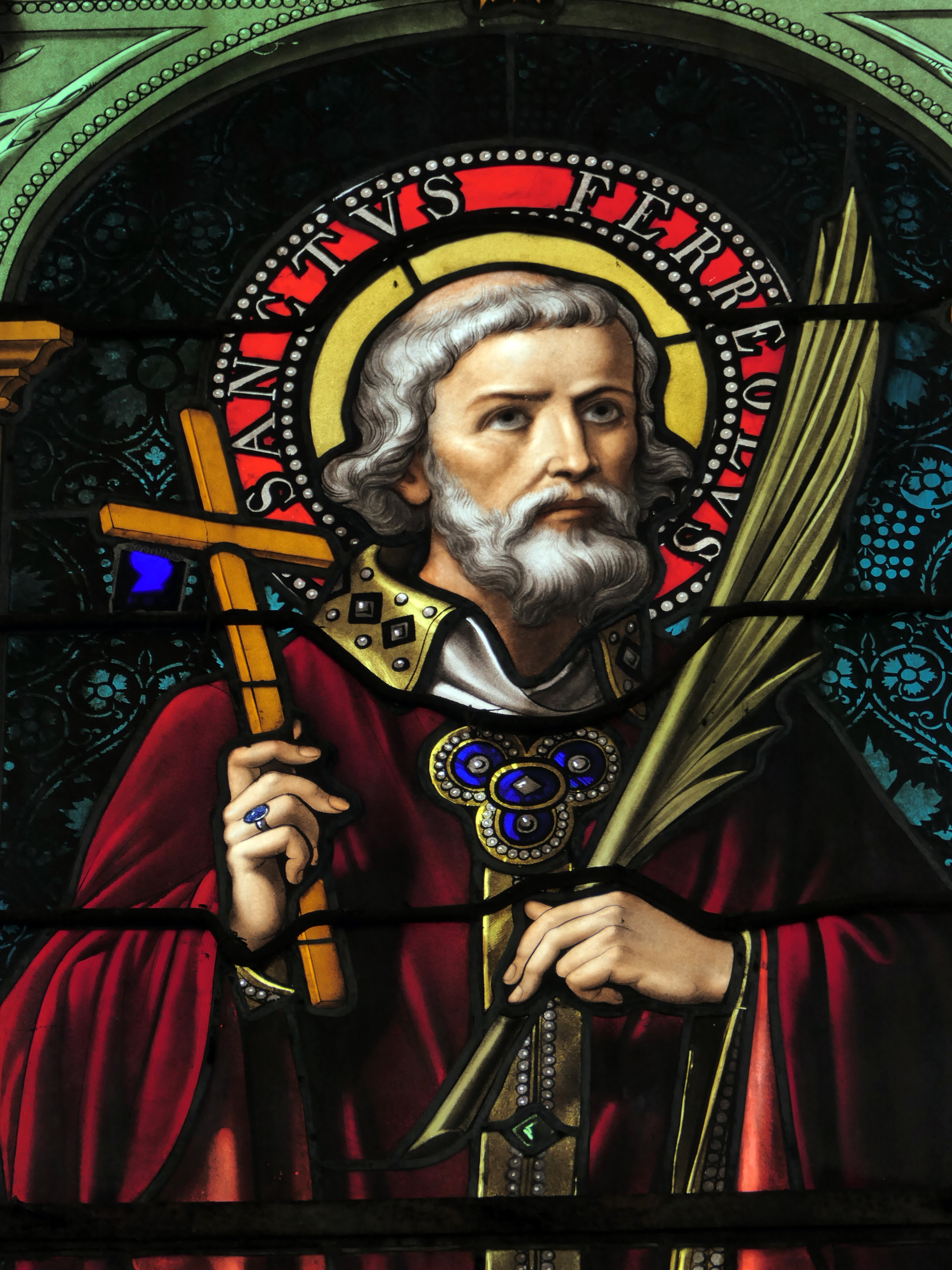
Saint Ferréol (Lavernay)

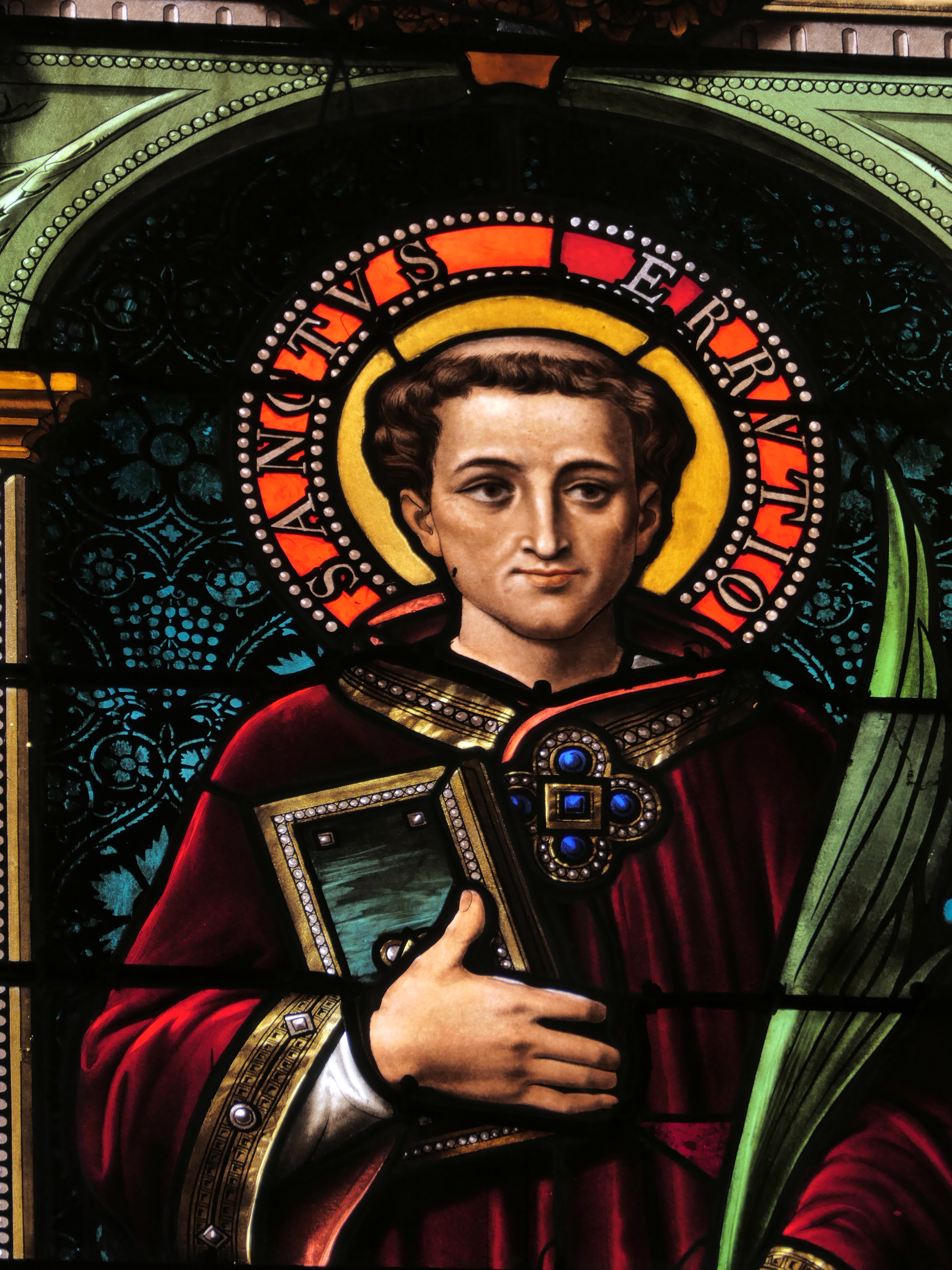
Saint Ferjeux (Lavernay)

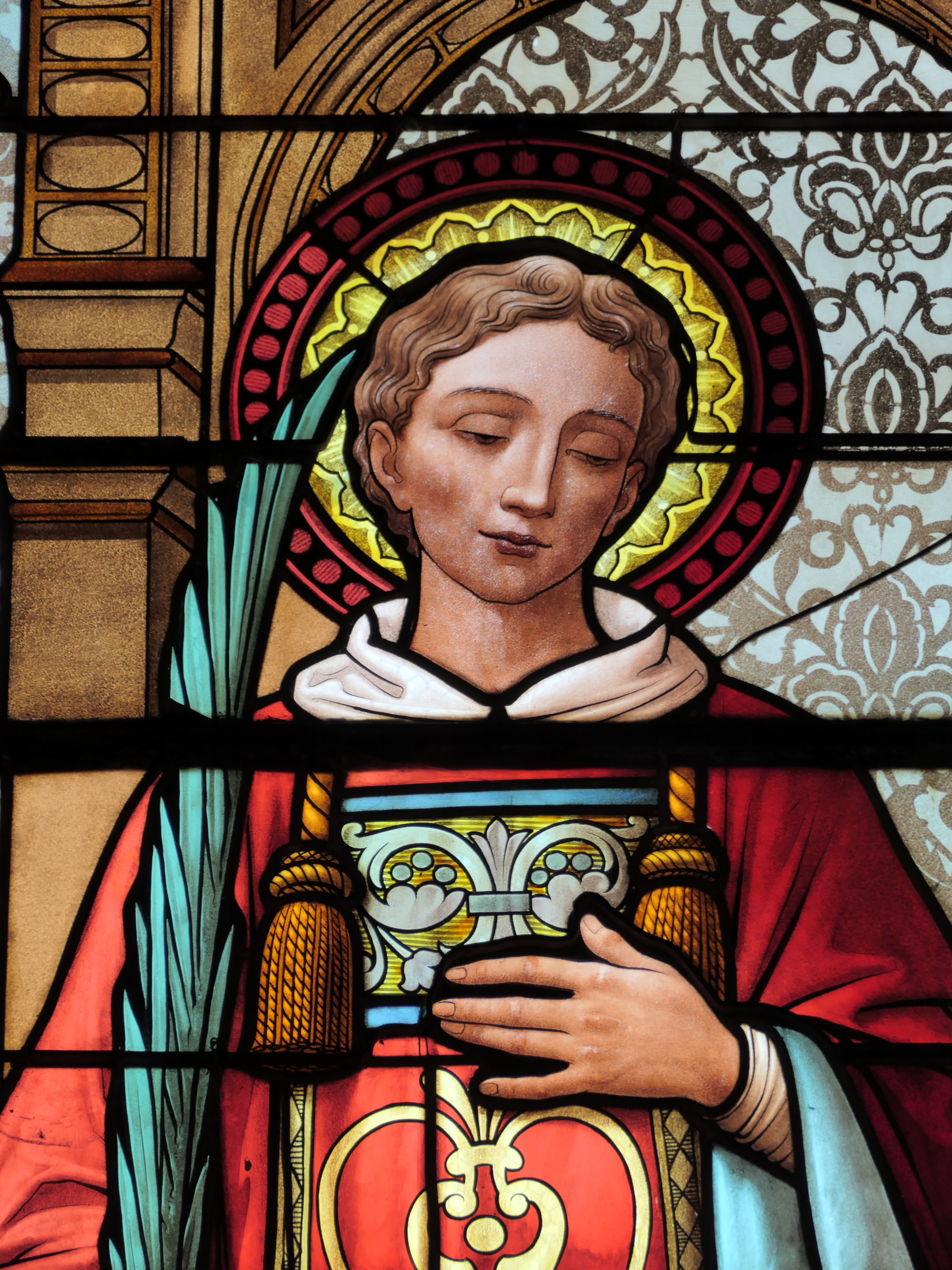
Saint Ferjeux (Passavant-la-Rochère)

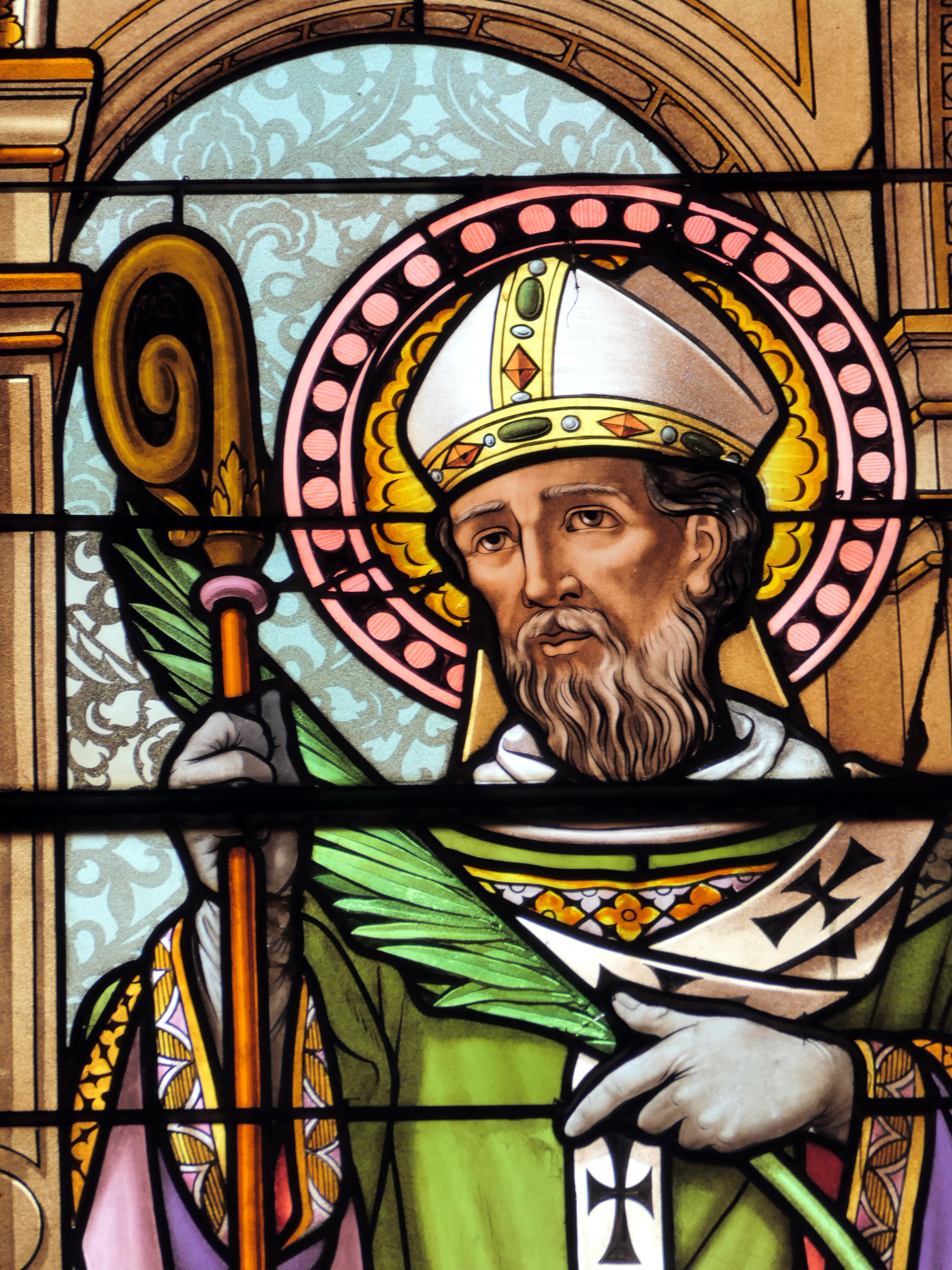
Saint Ferréol (Passavant-la-Rochère)
