= List of works by François Rude =

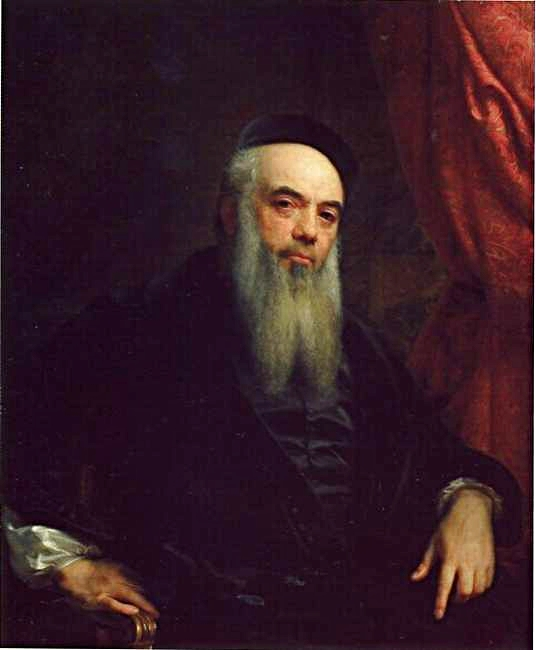
Painting of Francois Rude (1784-1855) by his wife Sophie Rude (Sophie Fremiet) (1797-1867), 1842.

Famous above all for the iconic sculpture La Marseillaise on the Arc de Triomphe de l’Étoile, François Rude was born in Dijon on 4 January 1781, the son of a coppersmith/locksmith. Apprenticed to his father, an injury made him unsuitable for forge-work, leading to his attending François Devosges's famous École de Dessin in Dijon where he was soon to show his artistic talent. He developed a relationship with Louis Frémiet, under whose patronage he began to study in 1805 with Pierre Cartellier in Paris at the studio of Edme Gaulle. By 1809 his work began to be noticed, winning him several awards. In 1815, having saved enough money, he left Paris for Rome, but due to political conditions, he ended up in Brussels once again living with the Frémiets. Whilst in Brussels he married Sophie Frémiet, an accomplished painter and they were to become a formidable force in the art world. In Brussels he executed his first bust of Louis David, gaining him much notice. They returned to Paris in 1827 where they remained until his death on 3 November 1855.

== Key ==
Meaning
Works executed in Dijon and Paris prior to exile
Works executed whilst in exile in Brussels
Works executed on return to Paris from exile
Miscellaneous

== Works ==
Name	Location	Photograph	Date	Notes
Plaster bust of Louis-Gabriel Monnier	Musée des Beaux-Arts de Dijon	Not available	1804	A very early work executed in Dijon. Monnier was an engraver and Sophie Frémiet's grandfather. The bust is held in Dijon's Musée des beaux arts. It was shown in 2013 at an exhibition entitled "Nel segno della Libertà, Gli artisti François (1784-1855) e Sophie (1797-1867) Rude" held at the Museo Vincenzo Vela in Italy.
Bust of Auguste Mugnier	Present whereabouts not known	See link	1805	This bust in terracotta was completed by Rude whilst in Dijon.
Génie tenant un cadran"		Not available	1805	Rude carried out this work in 1805
Lutteur au repos déposant son ceste	Musée du Louvre	Not available	1806	A lutteur is a wrestler. The Musée du Louvre holds both a plaster version of this composition originally sent to Baron Vivant Denon, the imperial museums superintendent, as well as a marble version made in 1828 for Adolphe Thiers, the French president.
Thésée recueillant les armes de son père.	Musée du Louvre Département des Sculptures	See link	1806	A bronze composition translated "Theseus gathering up the arms of his father", based on an earlier plaster work, presented in 1807 to Dominique Vivant Denon in Paris.
Colonne Vendôme	Place Vendôme in Paris		1806-1810	Rude was one of many sculptors who worked on the Colonne Vendôme in Paris' place Vendôme, started in 1806 at Napoleon's direction and completed in 1810. Pictured is part of the frieze on the Colonne Vendôme
Marius méditant sur les ruines de Carthage	Musée des Beaux-Arts de Dijon	See link	1809	"Marius méditant sur les ruines de Carthage" was submitted for the Prix de Rome competition of 1809. The plaster version is held in the Dijon Musée des beaux-arts. Ironically on account of the political disturbances of the time Rude did not visit Rome.
La Douleur morale	Present whereabouts not known	Not available	1810	This was Rude's submission for the 1810 Prix de Rome for sculpture.
Génie ailé immolant un taureau	Musée des Beaux-arts de Dijon	-	1811	This work in marble is held in the collection of the Musée des Beaux-Arts in Dijon. One of the compositions which was featured in the exhibition "François & Sophie Rude. Un couple d’artistes au XIXe siècle, citoyens de la Liberté" held in Dijon from 12 October to 28 January 2013. A bas-relief showing a winged angel sacrificing a bull by cutting its throat.
Attente mêlée de crainte.	École nationale supérieure des Beaux-Arts in Paris	Not available	1812	
Bust of Andromache	Paris, École nationale supérieure des Beaux-Arts in Paris	Not available	1812	A plaster bust.
Aristée deplore la perte de ses abeilles	Work destroyed	Not available	1812	Rude's winning submission for the Prix de Rome. Rude himself was to destroy the work many years later, fortunately the musée Rude has the plaster cast in their collection.
Two caryatides for théâtre de la Monnaie in Brussels	Whereabouts unknown	Not available		A commission piece for the Brussels theatre.
Statues of Mercury and Vulcan.	Plaster casts held by musee Rude		1923	These two sculptures were made initially for the l'Hôtel des Monnaies in Brussels. Plaster casts are held by the Musée Rude.
The Palais de Tervuren	Building destroyed by fire		During period of exile in Brussels 1816-1827	Commissioned by the architect Charles Vander Straeten for nine bas-reliefs for the palais de Tervuren entitled the Histoire d'Achille. The subjects were "Achille trempé dans le Styx", "Les premiers exploits d'Achille", "Achille parmi les filles de Lycomède", "Briséis séparée d'Achille, sur l'ordre d'Agamemnon",. Le cadavre de Patrocle rapporté au camp des Grecs", "Le combat d'Achille contre Hector", "Achille traînant le cadavre d'Hector autour des murs de Troie" and "Priam aux pieds d'Achille". Destroyed by a fire, plaster casts are still in existence and some can be seen in the musee Rude in Dijon. Also executed for the hunting lodge was a large bas-relief entitled "la Chasse de Méléagre" (pictured).
Interior decoration in the Royal Palace of Brussels.	Royal Palace of Brussels		During period of exile in Brussels 1816-1827	A major addition, carried out during the reign of William I, the so-called 'Empire room' was designed as a ballroom. It has a very refined cream and gold decoration designed and executed by Rude.
Caryatids Room	Brussels		1829	Regarded as one of the masterpieces of neo-classical architecture in Brussels. Lit by a huge glass roof and dominated by two balconies intended for the musicians which are decorated with caryatids by Rude.
Bust of William 1	Dijon Musée des Beaux-arts		1823	A bust of William 1. The original was destroyed, but the Dijon Musée des Beaux-arts holds the plaster cast. Intended for the palais des Etats Généraux, it was well received by the King helping Rude establish himself in Brussels.
Work for the Saint-Étienne church in Lille	Saint-Étienne, Lille		During period of exile in Brussels 1816-1827	The church's wooden pulpit (La Chaire de vérité). A wooden composition, five figures in ronde bosse and the reliefs La Foi and l'Espérance with a depiction of an archangel, two angels and a scene showing the stoning of St Étienne (St Stephen).
Bust of the painter Louis David.	Present whereabouts not known		1821	This bust was widely proclaimed a masterpiece but has disappeared. The Musée Rude does have the plaster cast of this work.
Portraits of the Ternaux family	Present whereabouts unknown	Not available	1812	Busts of several members of this family
Bust of Joseph Jacotot.	Musée des Beaux-arts de Dijon	Not available -	1816	An important French "exile" in Brussels, Jacotot commissioned his bust which can be seen in the Musée des Beaux-arts de Dijon.
Bust of M. Villaine.	Whereabouts unknown	Not available	1816-1820	Completed in Brussels.
Bust of Maurice de Saxe	Musee des Beaux-arts in Dijon		1836	This bust can be seen in the Musée des Beaux-arts in Dijon.
Plaster bust of André-Marie-Jean Jacques Dupin the Elder.	Musée des Beaux-Arts, Dijon		1838	This bust can be seen in the Musée des Beaux-arts in Dijon.
"Mercure rattachant ses talonnières; Mercure, après avoir tranché la tête à Argus"	Musée du Louvre département des Sculptures		1828	This bronze statue based on Ovid's Les Métamorphoses d'Ovide, was cast by Louis Claude Ferdinand Soyer and Etienne Germain Inge, and was submitted to the Paris Salon in 1834. Another but smaller model in bronze is held in the Thiers collection in the Louvre and the Musée du Louvre also holds a model fashioned in wax. A reduced bronze is also held by the Musée des Beaux-arts in Dijon. This work was shown at the 1855 Paris Êxposition Universelle.
Bust of Jean-François de La Pérouse	Musée de la Marine de Paris		1828	A bust of the French explorer and navigator was submitted to the Paris Salon of 1831.
Jeune pêcheur napolitain jouant avec une tortue also known as L'Enfant à la tortue	Musée du Louvre		1831	The plaster version of this work was submitted to the Paris Salon of 1831 and a bronze version was submitted in 1833. The work was also shown at the 1855 Exposition Universelle. The Musée du Louvre holds the marble version of the work and the Dijon Musée des Beaux-arts holds the bronze version. Plaster versions can be seen in the Musée de Toulon and the Musée de Rennes.
Le Départ des Volontaires de 1792	Paris- Arc de Triomphe de l'Étoile		1836	An intensely patriotic composition known as La Marseillaise is a part of the Arc de Triomphe de l'Étoile, an enormous 50-metre-high (160 ft) structure, designed by Jean-François Chalgrin in 1806 to celebrate France's military achievements.
Palais Bourbon	Paris		1837	Prométhée animant les Arts is one of the two bas-reliefs on the pediment of the Palais Bourbon/Chambre des députés. The other is by James Pradier.
Le Baptême du Christ	Musée du Louvre département des Sculptures		1838	The wax model depicting the baptism of Christ is situated in the La Madeleine's "chapelle des Fonts baptismaux". The work was commissioned by the French Ministry of the Interior in 1838 and the marble version was installed in 1841. A plaster model is held in the Église de Ville-d'Avray and a further model is held by the Musée d'Angers. The Musée de Dijon holds a model used as a study for Christ's head and another model in wax is held by the Musée du Louvre.
Bust of Louis d'Armagnac	Grand Palais (Château de Versailles)		1839	
Caton d'Utique lisant le Phédon avant de se donner la mort	Musée du Louvre		1840	Jean-Baptiste Roman was commissioned to carry out this marble sculpture in 1832 and it was completed by Rude, after Roman's death in 1835.
Statue of Louis XIII	Dijon, Musée des Beaux-Arts		1843	The Duke of Luynes, owner of the Château de Dampiere, commissioned a statue of Louis XIII at the age of sixteen. Monumental in size and cast in solid silver, it was stolen in the early 21st century and has disappeared. Fortunately the Luynes had commissioned a bronze to be cast by Barbedienne and this eventually came into the possession of the Dijon Musée des Beaux-Arts.
Napoleon s'eveillant a l'Immortalite	Parc Noiset in Fixin		1845	Napoleon waking up to immortality was executed in 1845 for Captain Noisot, a loyalist soldier. The sculpture was cast in bronze by Eck and Durand and erected in the "Parc de Fixin" in 1847. The original model of the work was kept in the "Maison du Garde in Fixin and cast in bronze by Thiebaut Freres for the Dijon museum. The plaster model is held in the musée d'Orsay.
Jeanne d'Arc écoutant ses voix	Musée du Louvre		1845	This work in marble was commissioned in 1845 by Louis-Philippe for the series of statues in the Paris Jardin du Luxembourg depicting famous women. It is held in fact by the Musée du Louvre. Joan is depicted at the age of 13, listening to the voices of Saint Michel, Sainte Catherine and Sainte Marguerite who ordered her to deliver France from the English occupation. Pictured is the plaster caste in Musée Rude of Jeanne d'Arc écoutant ses voix.
Statue of Gaspard Monge	Beaune		1847	A bronze statue. Eck and Durand carried out the casting in 1849. The Musée du Louvre hold a plaster model of just the head. This work was submitted to the Paris Salon of 1848. It was spared requisition by the Germans who had had many other bronze works melted down for the manufacture of armaments during World War II.
Church of Saint-Vincent-de-Paul, Paris	Paris		1852	A calvary for this church, exhibited at the Paris Salon of 1852.
Statue of General Henri Gatien Bertrand	Place Ste Helene, Châteauroux		1853	Depicts Bertrand returning from St Helena with Napoleon's will and testament. He carries the will in one hand and in the other the sword of Austerlitz on a drape bearing "N" and a crown.
Statue of Marshal Ney			1853	Executed by firing squad in Paris near the Luxembourg Garden on 7 December 1815 for supporting Napoleon during the Hundred Days (Cent Jours), he was rehabilitated under the Second Republic and the government decided to support the erection of a monument in his memory. The monument was inaugurated on 7 December 1853. Ney takes on the attitude of a warrior, brandishing his sabre. Alfonse de Gisors was asked to execute the pedestal. On the pedestal there is a full summary of Ney's career. See photograph in gallery
Statue of Nicolas Poussin	Louvre		1854	The statue of Poussin is one of the many statues that decorate the Aile Mollien of the Cour Napoleon in the Louvre Palace, whereas his statue of the sculptor Houdon is one of the statues decorating the Aile Daru.
The tomb of Pierre Cartellier	Cimetière du Père-Lachaise. Paris			Rude created the sculpture La Bonté for this tomb in the Cimetière du Père-Lachaise. A plaster model is held by the Musée du Louvre and a plaster cast for the work is held by the Musée des Beaux-arts in Dijon. Pictured is the plaster cast in the Musée Rude.
Medallion depicting Louis Fremiet.	Mons	Not available		The sculptor Fremiet was Rude's father-in-law and this medallion was made for his tomb in Mons' cemetery in Belgium. It was removed in 1880 and the sculptor Louis Henri Devillez restored it, helped by the Rudier foundry. It was then given to Musée du Louvre département des Sculptures.
Statue of Fremiet				A study of Fremiet.
Works by Rude in the musée des Beaux-Arts de Dijon	Musée des beaux-arts of Dijon			Le Musée des beaux-arts of Dijon holds a collection of Rude's work, consisting of 38 sculptures and 175 of his design drawings. The sculptures include: L'Amour Dominateur du Monde a work in marble shown at the Paris Salon of 1857. Commissioned by Anatole Devosge, it was finished by Paul Cabet.; A bust depicting François Devosge.; Hébé et l’aigle de Jupiter (pictured). A marble version was finished by Paul Cabet and Madame Rude, after Rude's death. The Musée du Louvre holds a smaller bronze version as well as a model for Hebe's head. A much produced piece, there is a bronze version of it in Chicago's Art Institute, cast by Thiebaut Freres the Paris founders, which bears the inscription: "Toward the end of his career, François Rude was commissioned by his native city of Dijon to create a marble sculpture, for which he depicted the Greek goddess of youth, Hebe. Here she is shown in her role as cupbearer to the gods, raising a vessel of ambrosia above her father, Zeus, who appears in the guise of an eagle. Rude made the model for the marble group in 1852 but did not live to finish the work, which was completed by his nephew. The bronze cast is a reduced version of the marble and was extremely popular in the late 19th century as part of the nostalgia for pre-Revolutionary sculpture"; Marius méditant sur les ruines de Carthage. The museum holds an 1809 plaster version of this composition.; Départ des Volontaires. The museum holds the maquette for this work. See separate entry.; In addition, they hold Rude's bust of the painter Jacques-Louis David and Paul Cabet's bronze bust of François Rude. They also show Rude's wife Sophie Rude's oil painting " La Duchesse de Bourgogne arrêtée aux portes de Bruges", which was shown at the Paris Salon of 1841.
Musée Rude	Dijon			The Musée des Beaux-Arts de Dijon, the artist's home town, holds an extensive collection of his works.
The tomb of Godefroy Cavaignac	Cimetière Saint-Pierre in Montmartre.			Effigy on the tomb located in the Cimetière Saint-Pierre in Montmartre.
Medallion depicting Rude's La Marseillaise	Musée d'Orsay			Henri Dubois executed a bronze medallion showing Rude's La Marseillaise in 1888 and this is held by the Musée d'Orsay.
Bust of Jacques-Louis David	Musée du Louvre]		1838	A marble bust. There is another marble version dating to 1831 also held by the Louvre. There are several versions of this bust in existence: The Château de Versailles holds a plaster version as do the Musée des Beaux-arts in Dijon, the Musée de Châlons sur Marne, the Musée des Beaux-arts in Rouen and the Musée des Beaux-arts in Toulon. The 1831 marble version was shown at the Paris Salon in that year.
Bust of Madame Cabet, Rude's niece and wife of Paul Cabet.	musée des Beaux-Arts in Dijon		1853	Executed to mark the marriage his niece to Paul Cabet.
L'Amour dominateur du monde	Musée des Beaux-Arts of Dijon		1857	This composition in marble, ordered by Anatole Devosge, directeur de l'École des beaux-arts de Dijon, was finished by Paul Cabet after Rude's death. It was shown at the Paris Salon in 1857
Models by Rude in terracotta	Dijon			The Musée des Beaux-arts in Dijon holds three terracotta works by Rude. These are a bust of Napoleon the First, of the prophet Jeremiah and Sapho.
Dix francs François Rude				The French treasury issued a ten franc piece in honour of Rude.
Monument to François Rude by Joseph Tournois	Dijon			There was a monument dedicated to Rude in Dijon with a bronze sculpture by Joseph Tournois dating to 1886. The inscription details Rude's principal works. Tournois depicts Rude using a mallet and chisel and wearing a smock (paradessus). The inauguration took place on 18 October 1886. In 1942 under the Vichy régime de Vichy the statue was removed and the bronze melted down. In 1953 a new statue of Rude was erected in its place in Auguste-Dubois, the work of the sculptor Vigoureux.
Bust of Rude by Jean-Esprit Marcellin	Musée d'Orsay			The Musée d'Orsay holds a plaster bust of Rude by Jean-Esprit Marcellin, executed in 1847. Marcellin then produced a terracotta version of the composition in 1879 and this was shown at the Paris Salon of 1879 where it was purchased by the French State. This terracotta version is held by the Gap museum, where Marcellin was born. The plaster version is held by the Musée d'Orsay. The Musée d'Orsay holds a second bust of Rude, in marble, by Just Becquet from Besançon, which was shown at the 1891 Paris Salon. The plaster model was shown at the Paris Salon in 1888, and now is held by the d'Orsay museum.

== Gallery of images ==
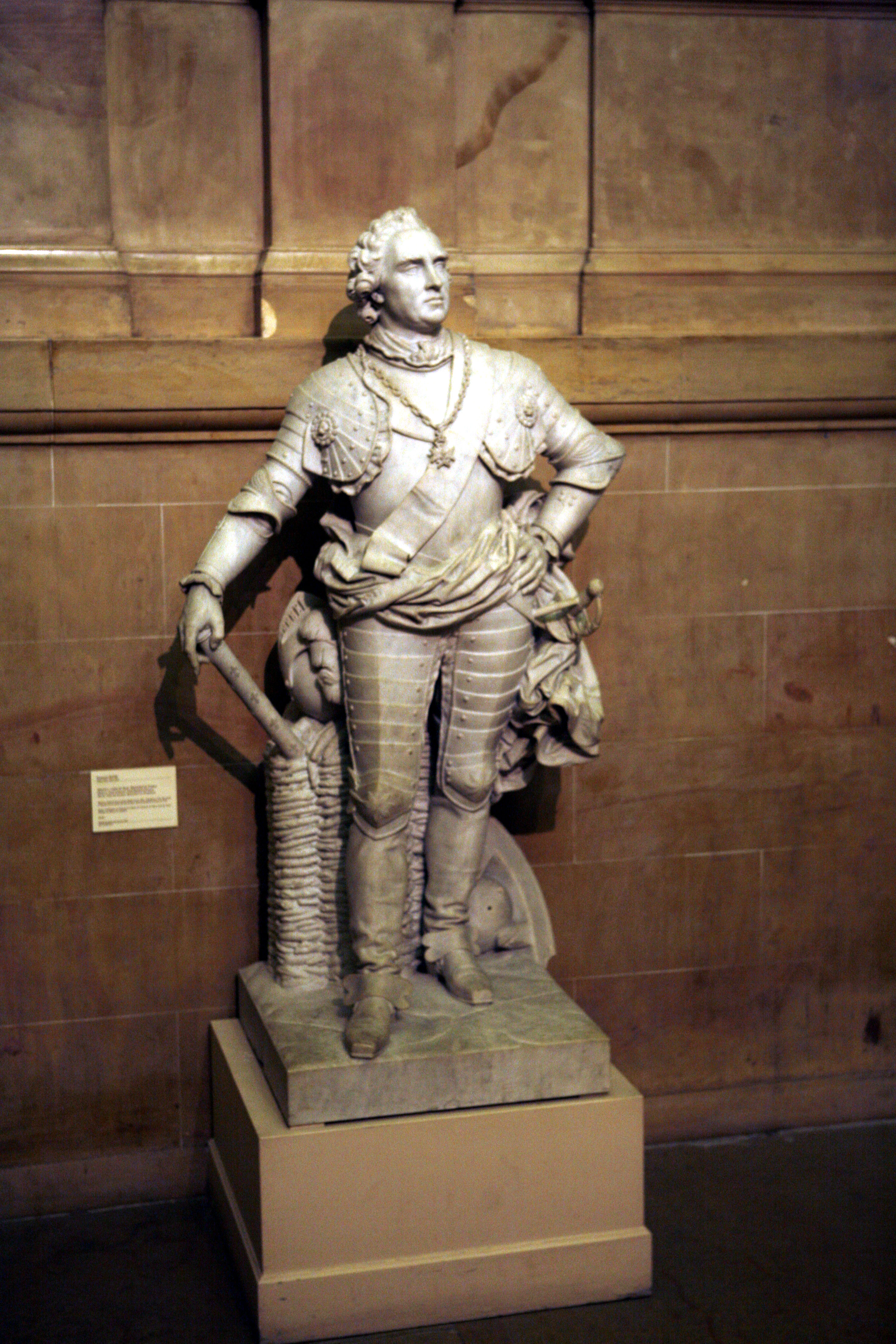
Statue by Rude of Maurice, Count of Saxony

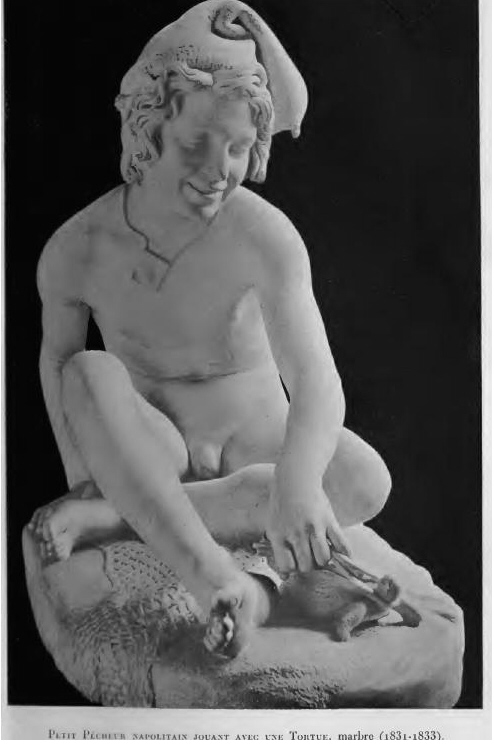
François Rude statue: Young neapolitan fisherboy playing with a tortoise, 1831-1833 Paris, Louvre Museum. Photo from the book François Rude - Ses Oeuvres Et Son Temps, by L. De Fourcard, Paris 1904

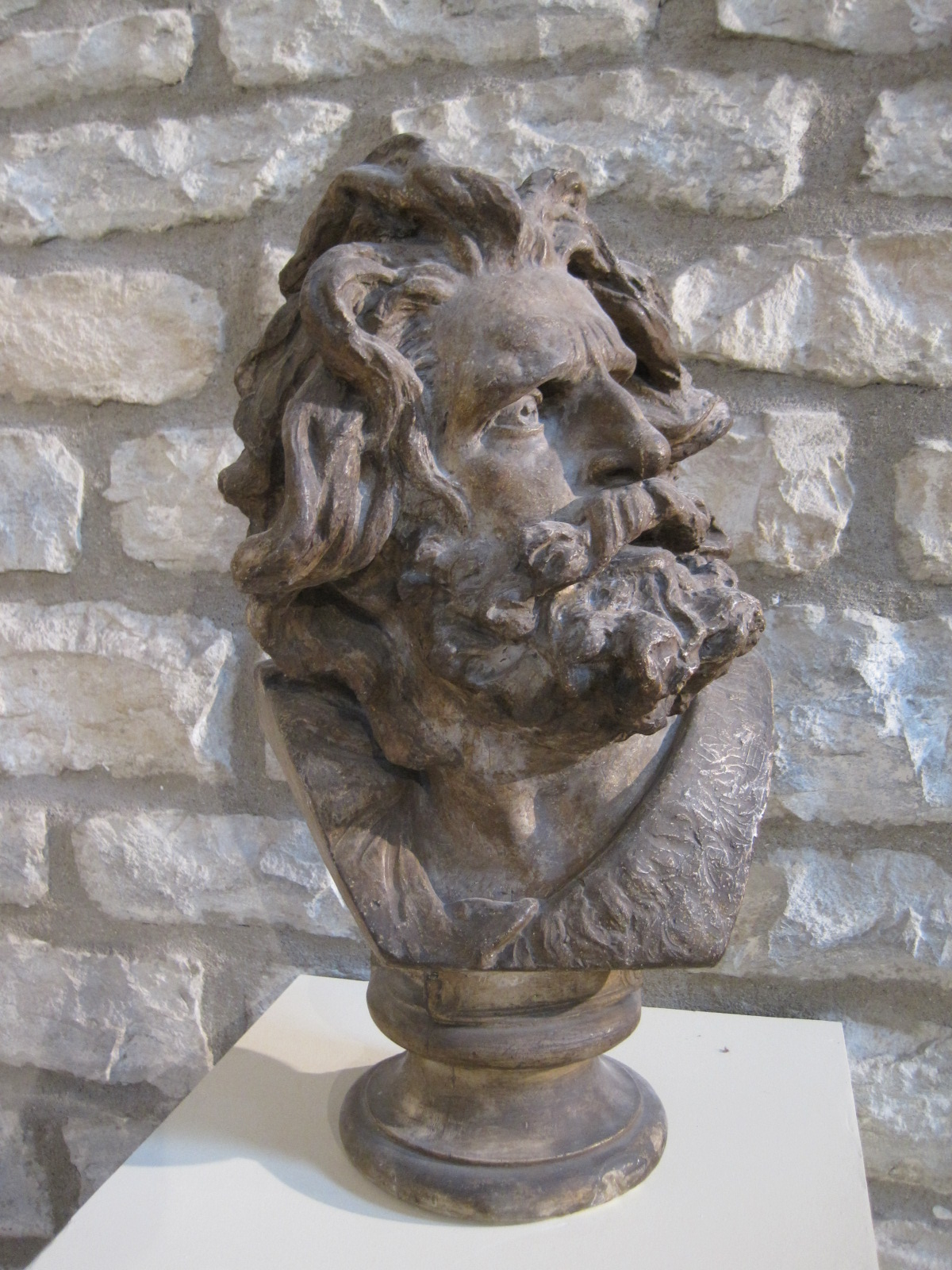
Musée François Rude - Rude's tête de vieux guerrier - 1834/1836

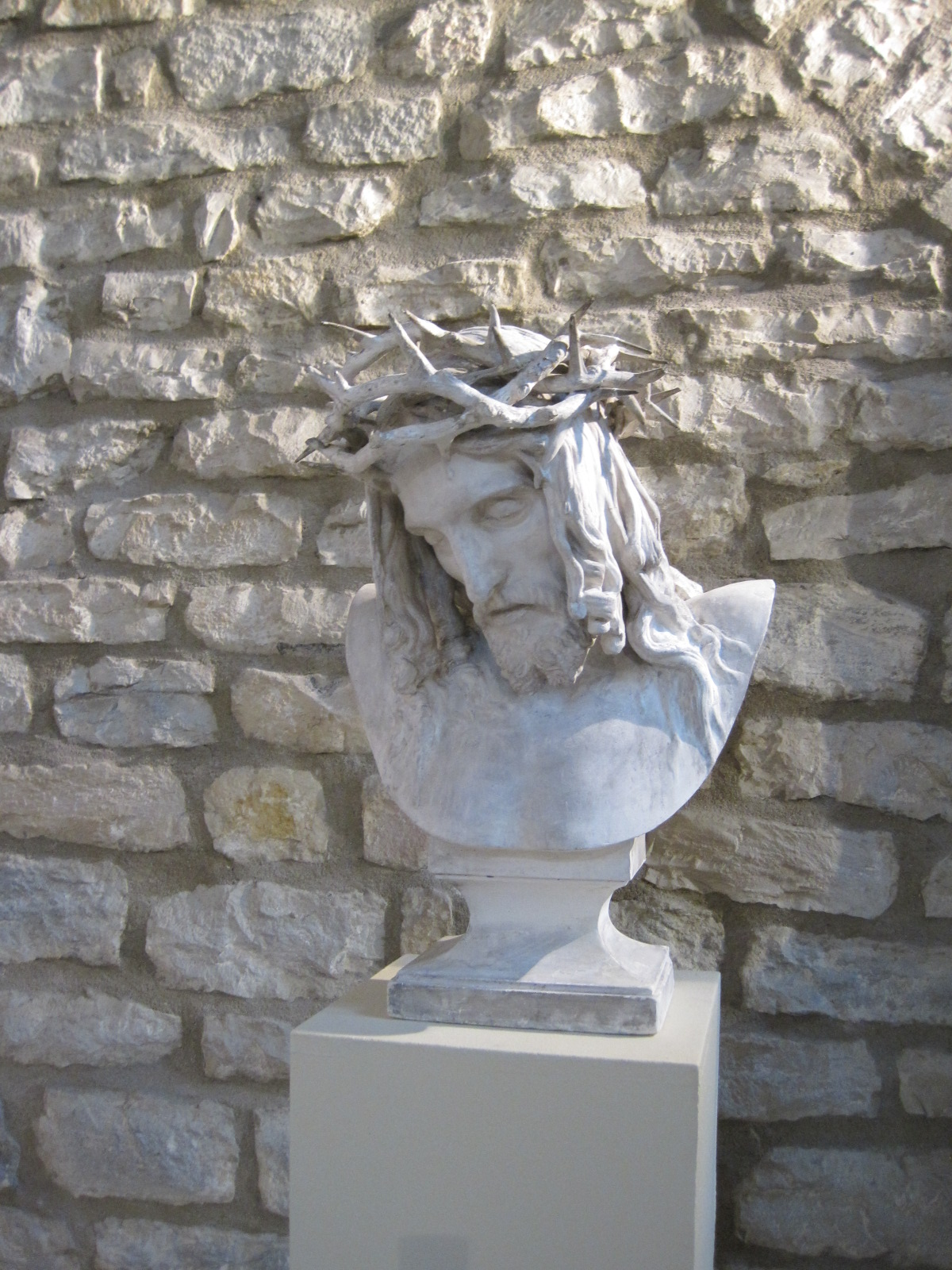
plaster cast in Musée Rude of Rude's 1852 Head of Christ.

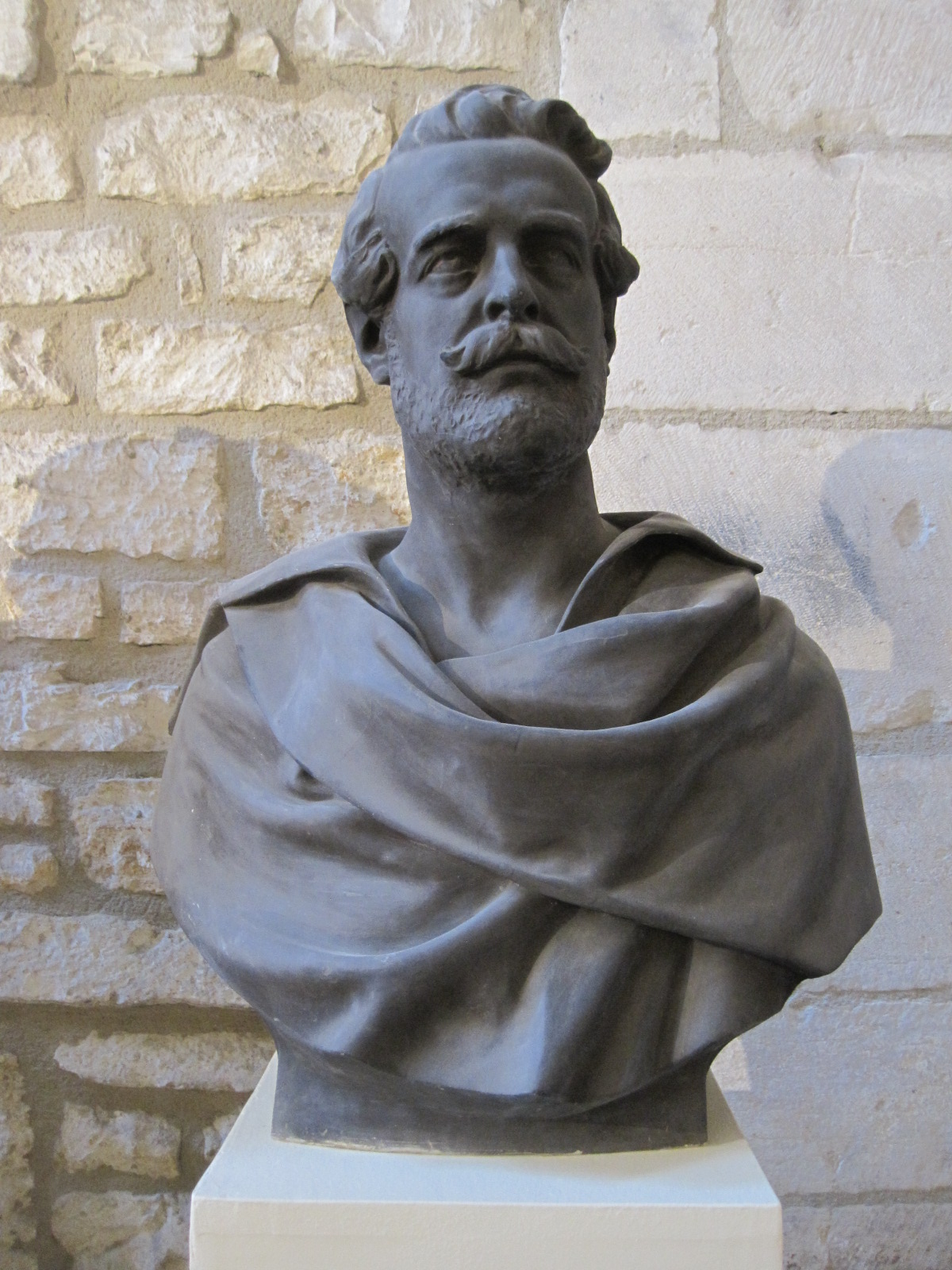
Plaster cast of bust of the politician James de Montry in Musée François Rude. Dates to 1850.

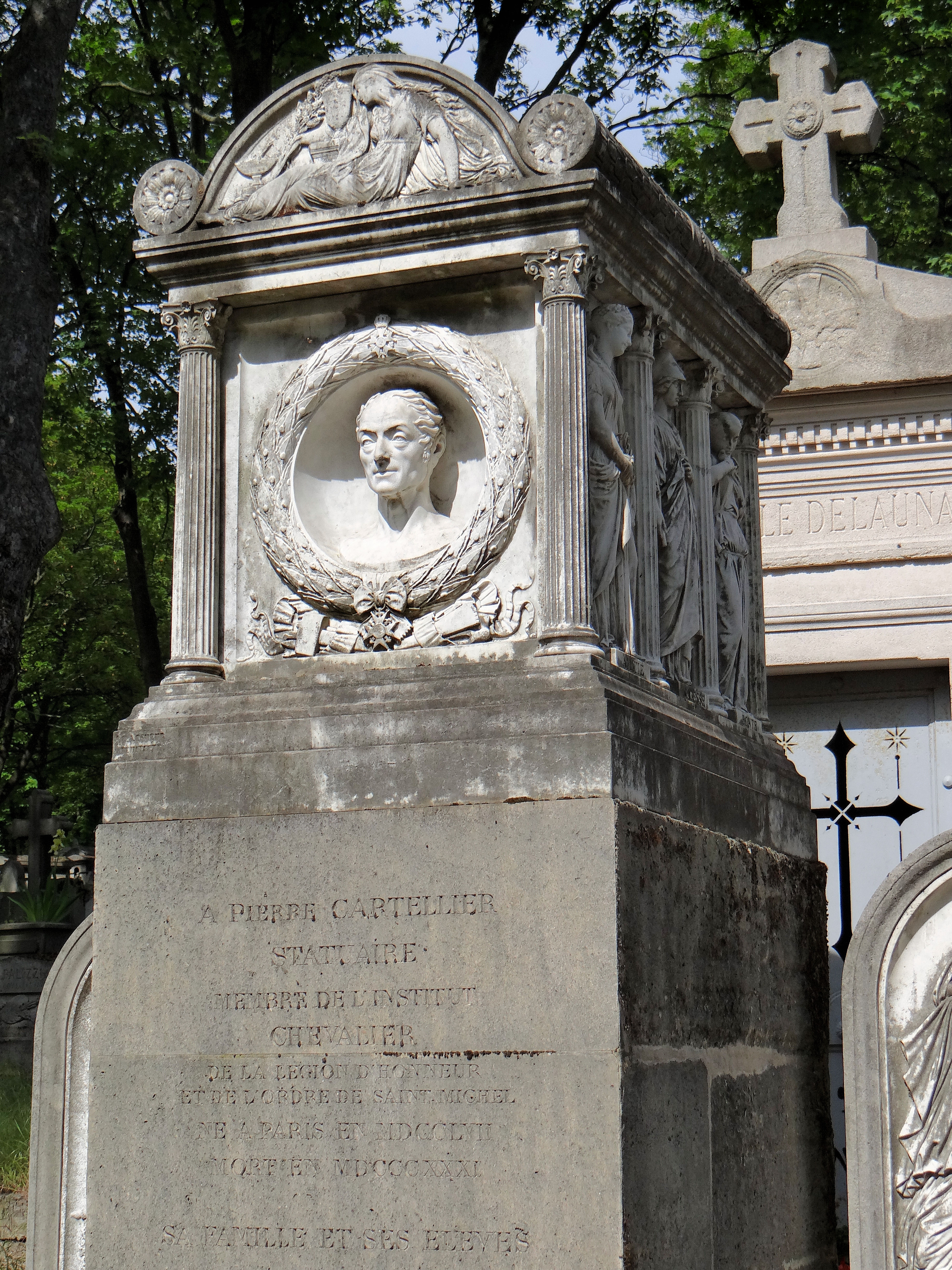
Rude's sculpture on the grave of Pierre Cartellier.

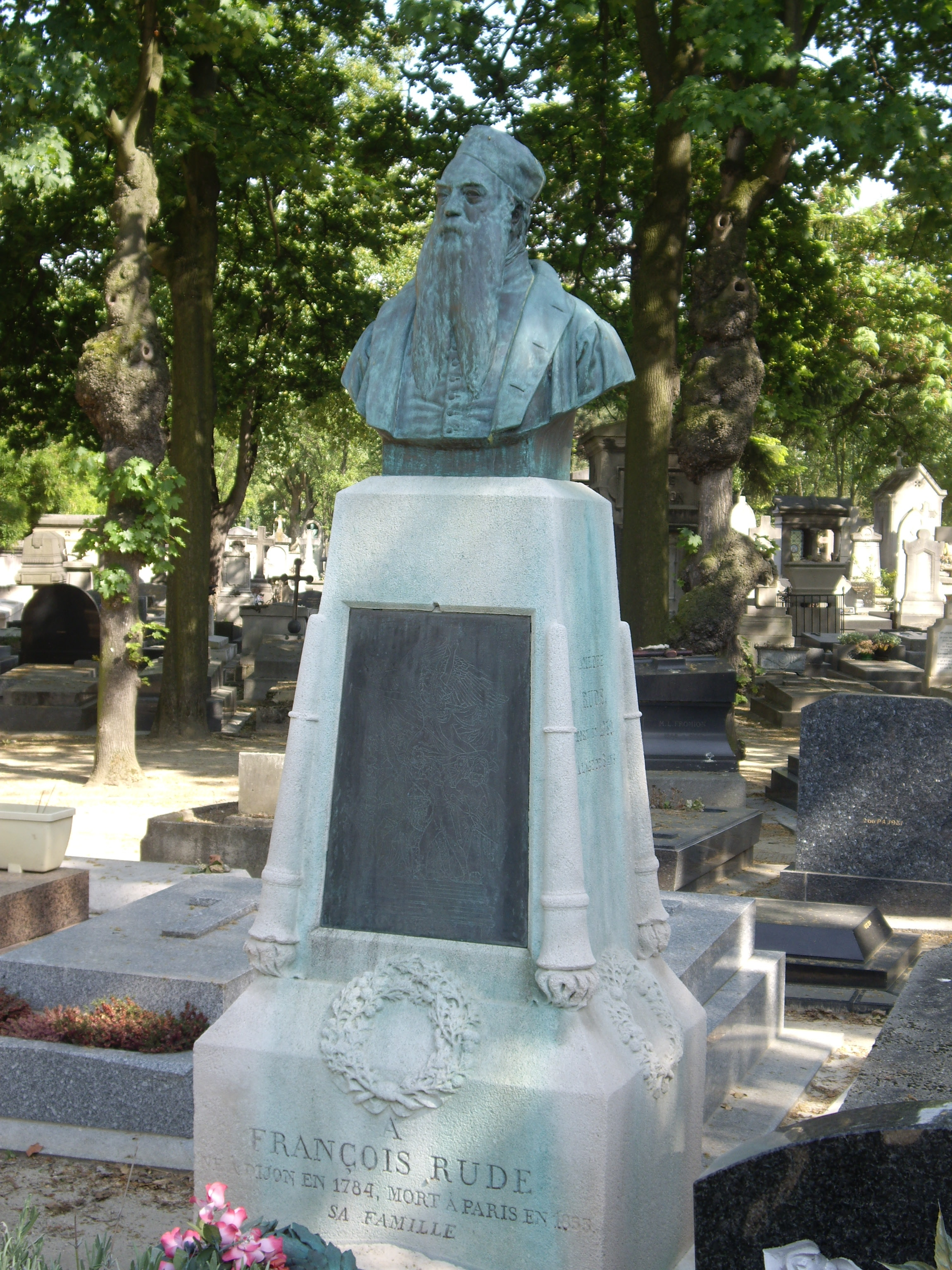
Rude's tomb in the Montparnasse cemetery, division 1.

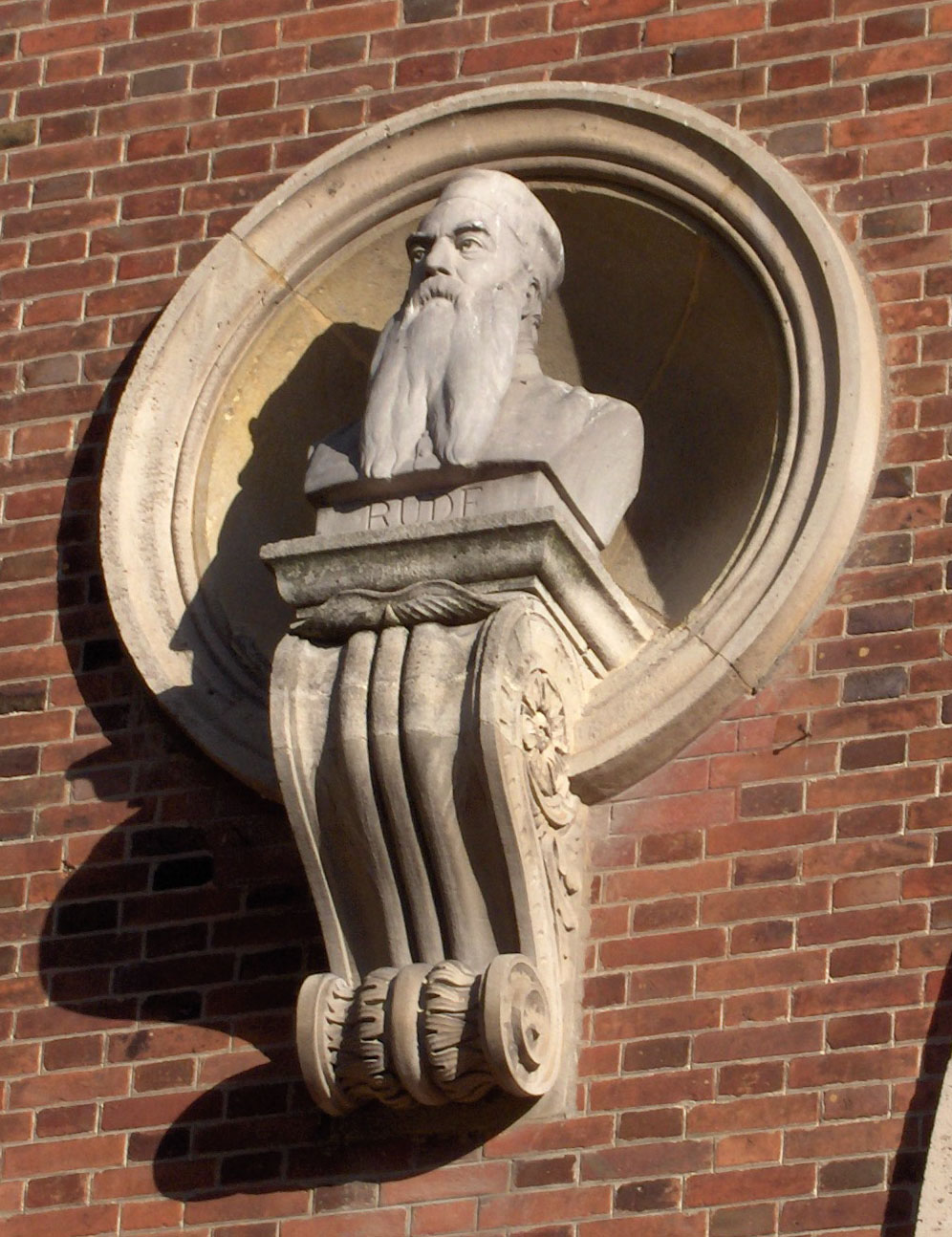
Bust of Rude in Palais du Luxembourg, Paris.

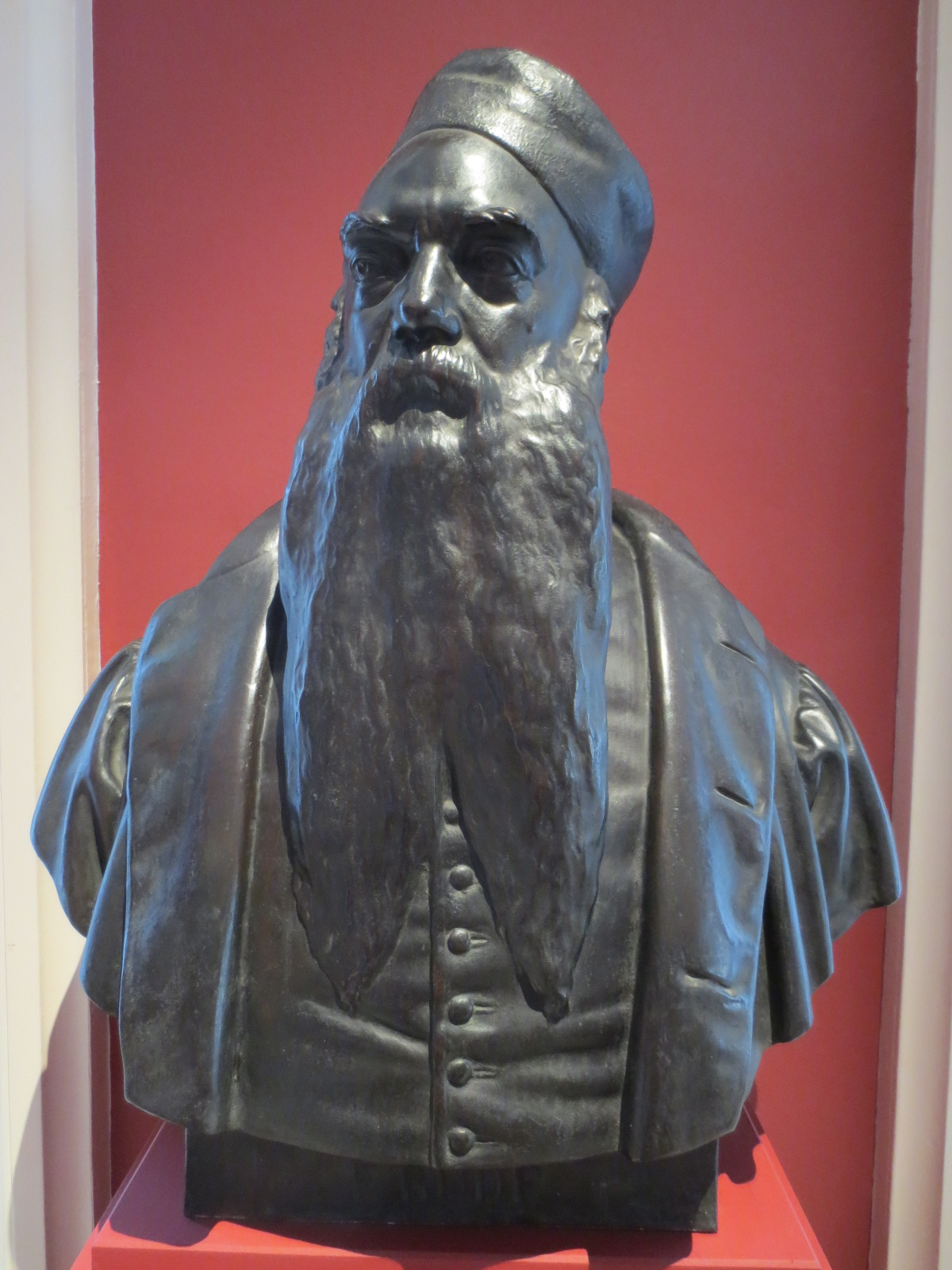
Bronze bust of François Rude by his nephew the sculptor Paul Cabet in the musée des beaux-arts de Dijon.

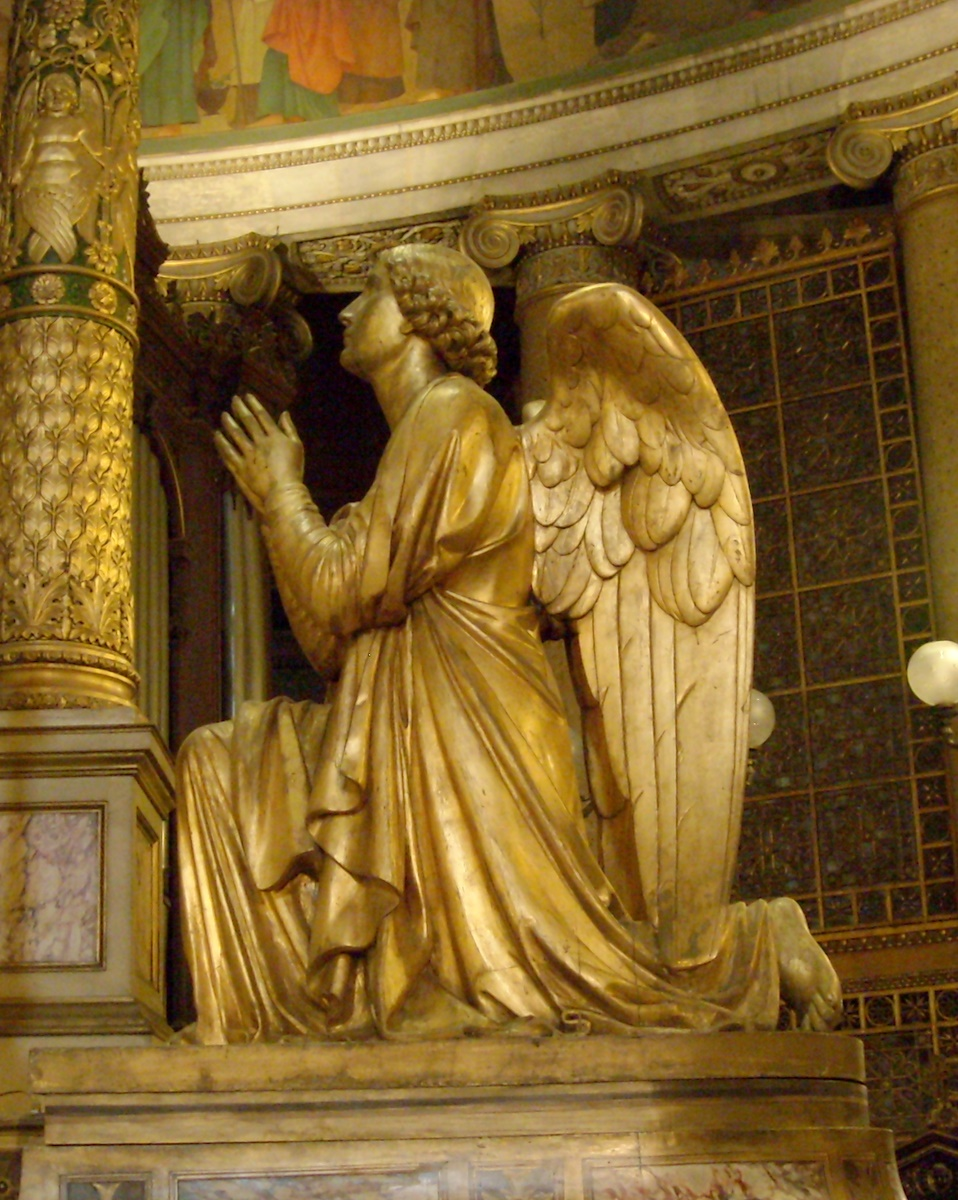
Part of Rude's Calvary in Saint Vincent de Paul church in Paris

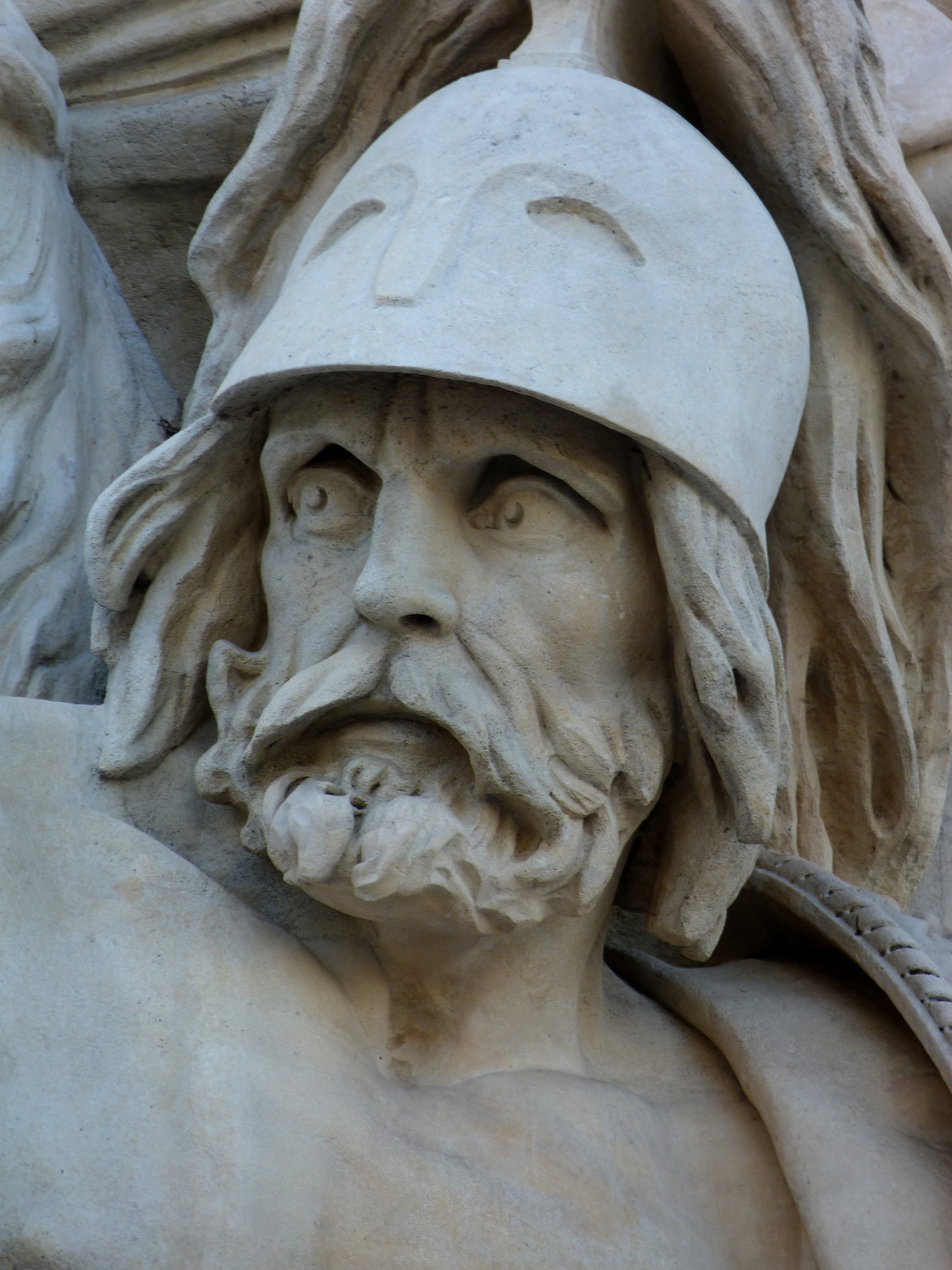
Detail from La Marseillaise by François Rude.

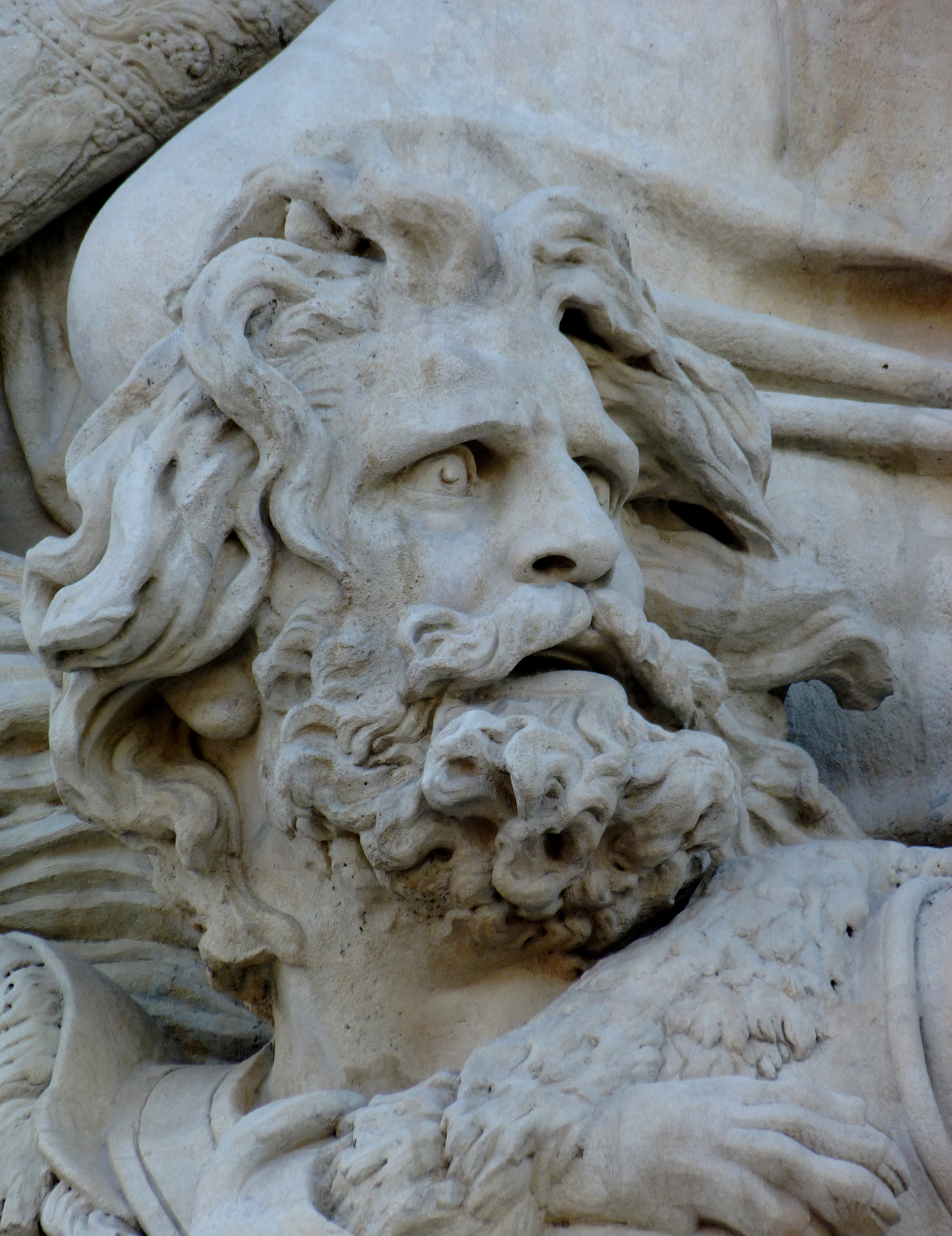
Detail from La Marseillaise by François Rude.

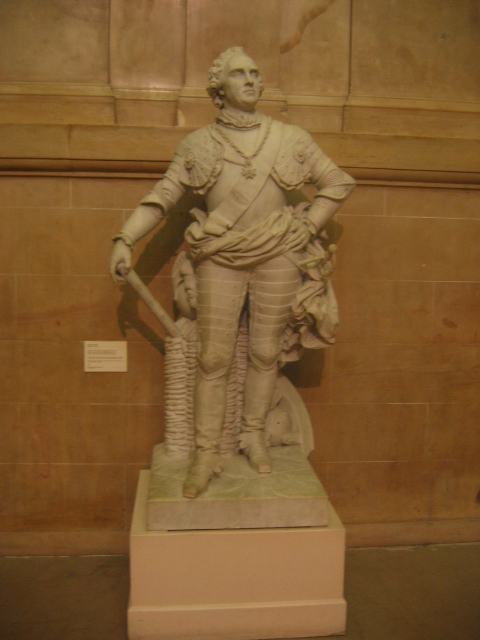
The Maréchal de Saxe by François Rude

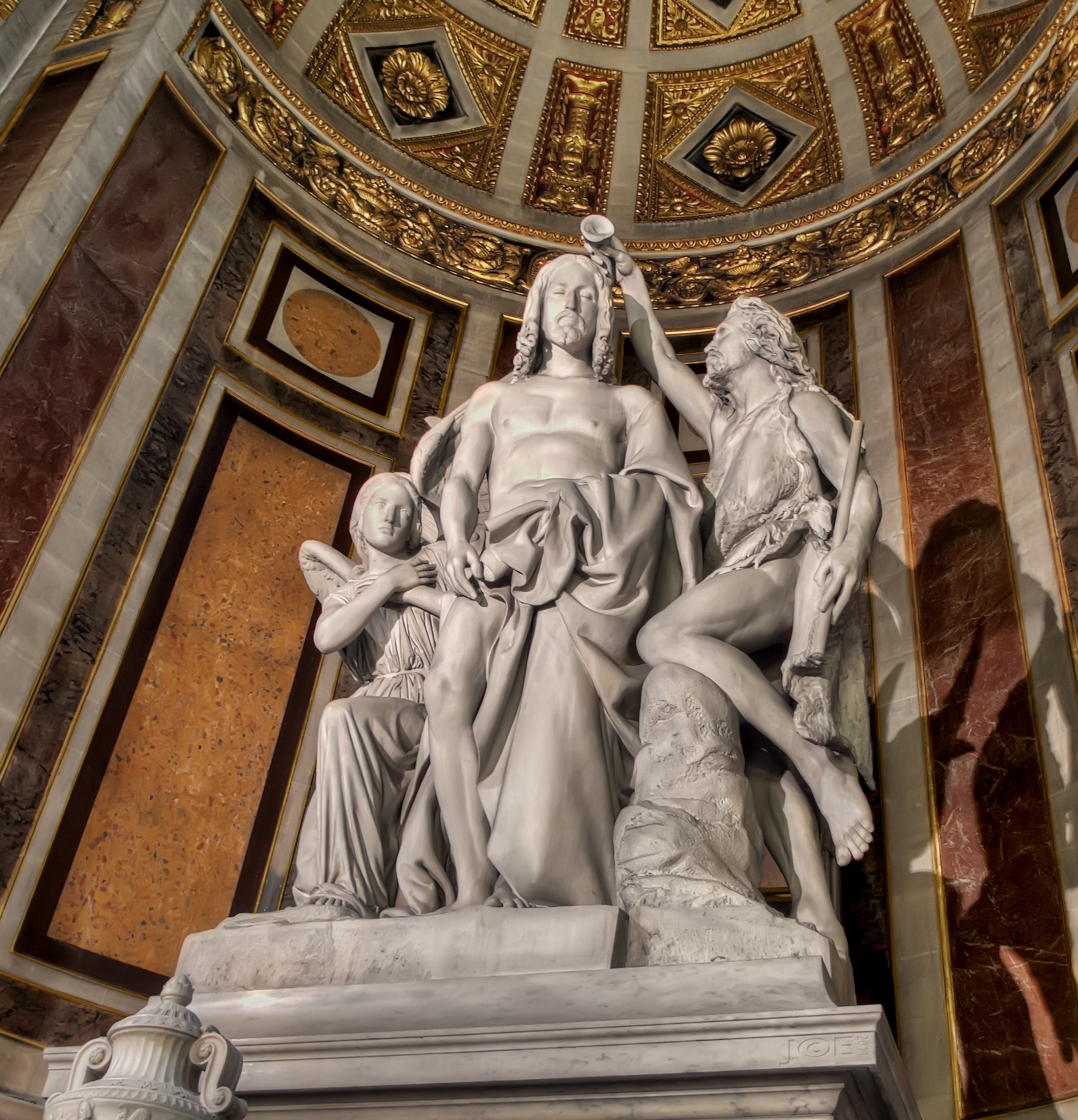
The Baptism of Christ. Rude's sculpture in La Madeleine by François Rude.

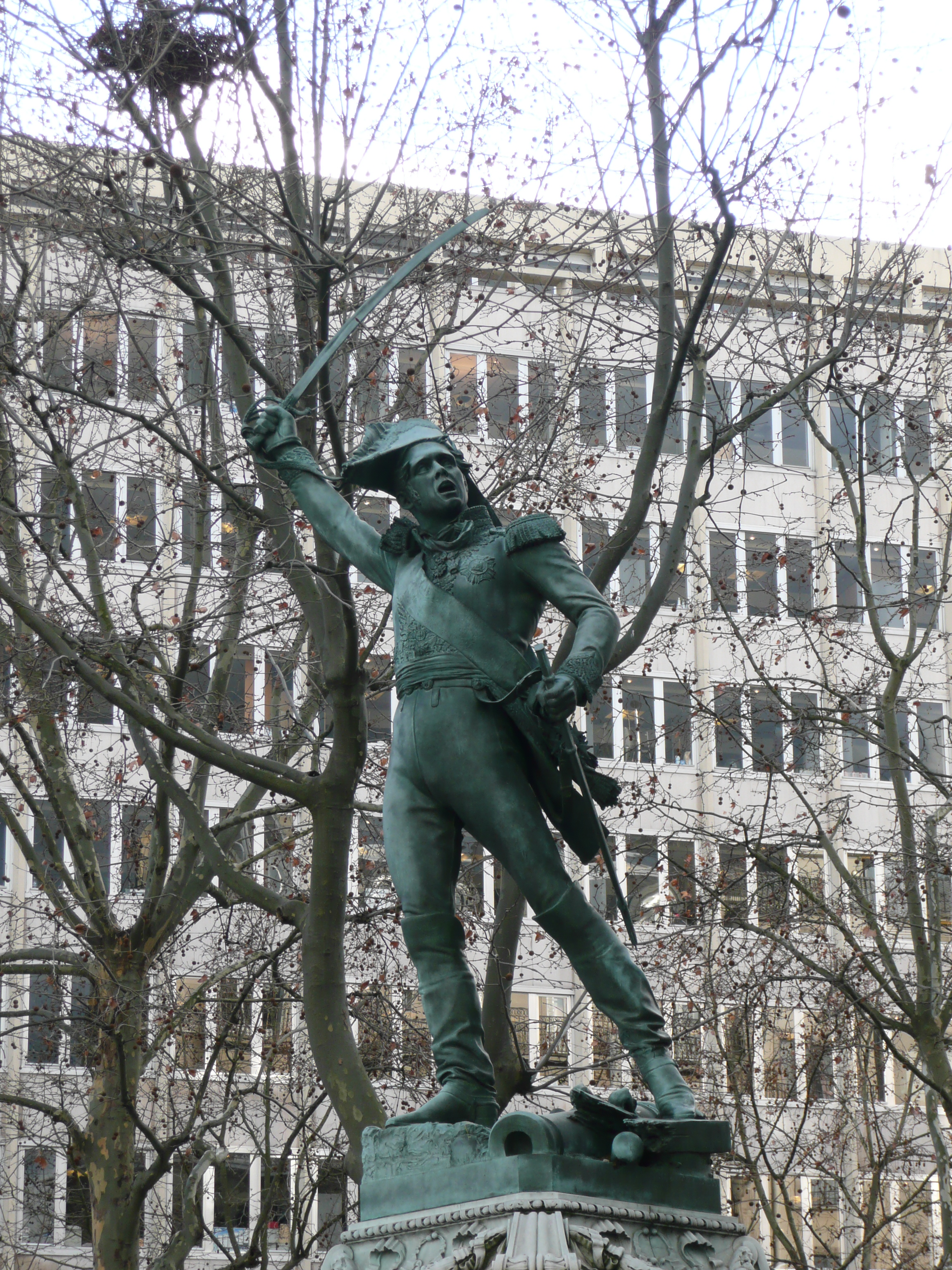
Statue of Michel Ney in Paris' Avenue de l'Observatoire by François Rude

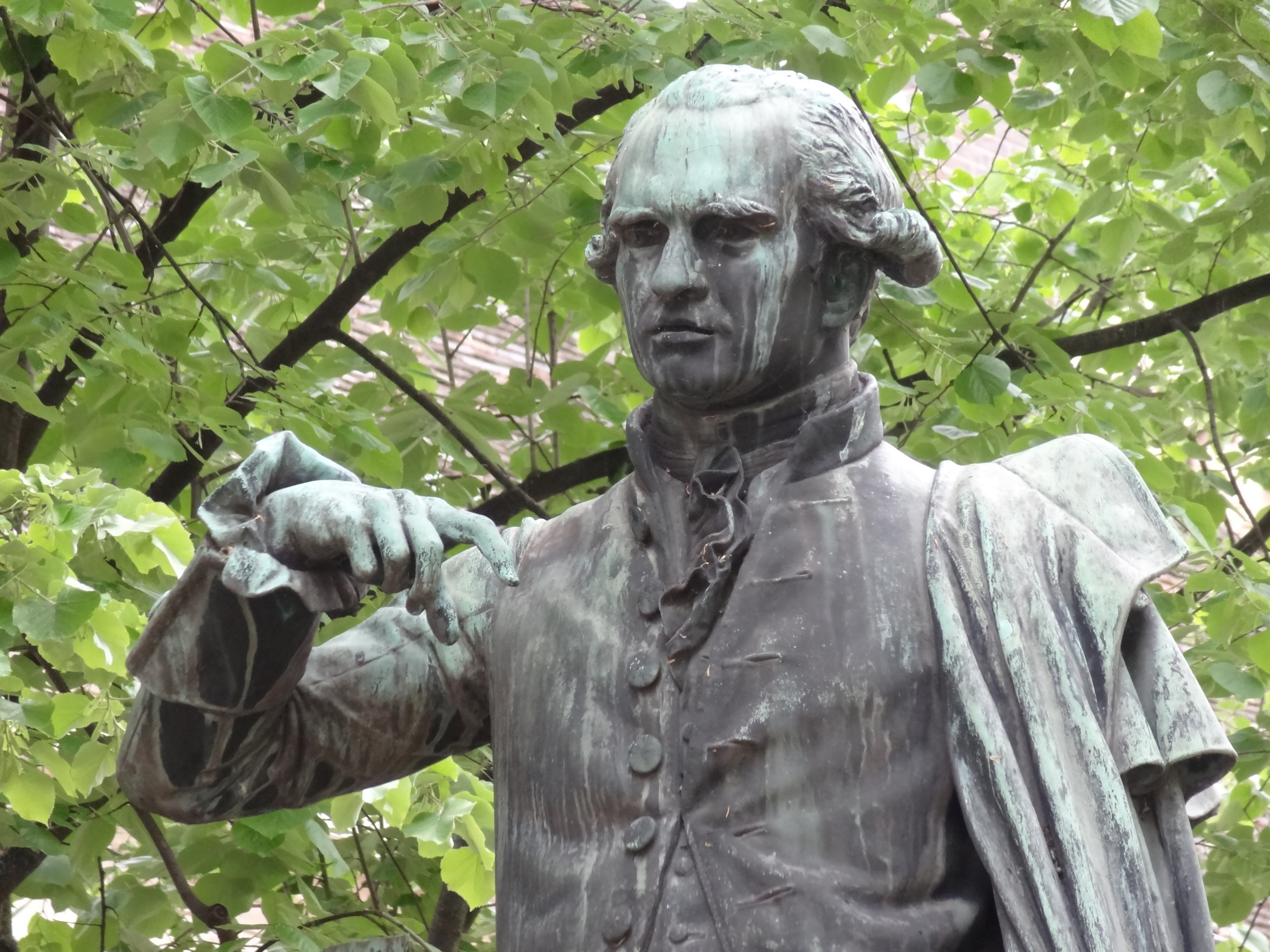
Rude's statue of Gaspard Monge.

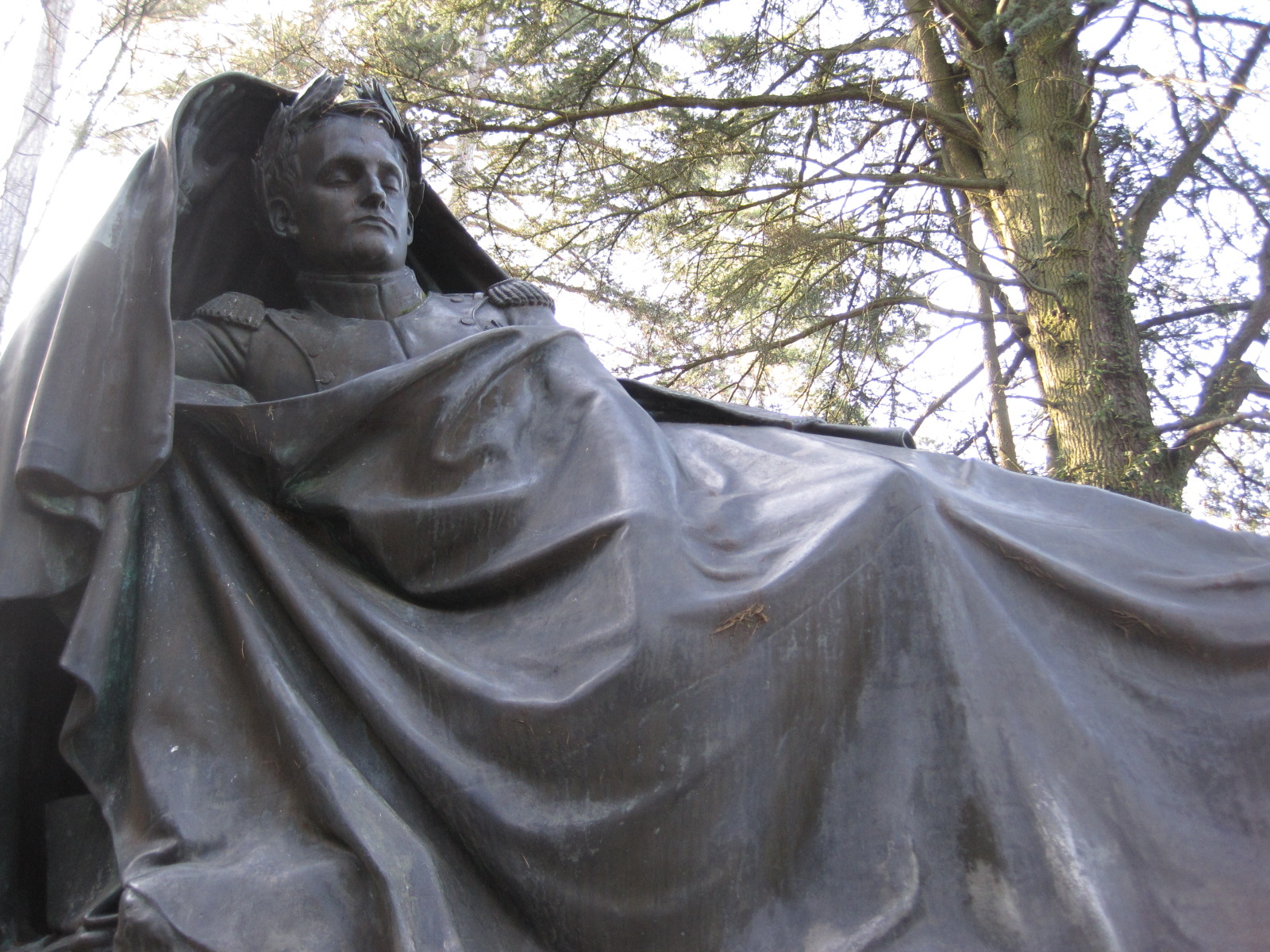
Rude's study of Napoleon in the Parc Noisot

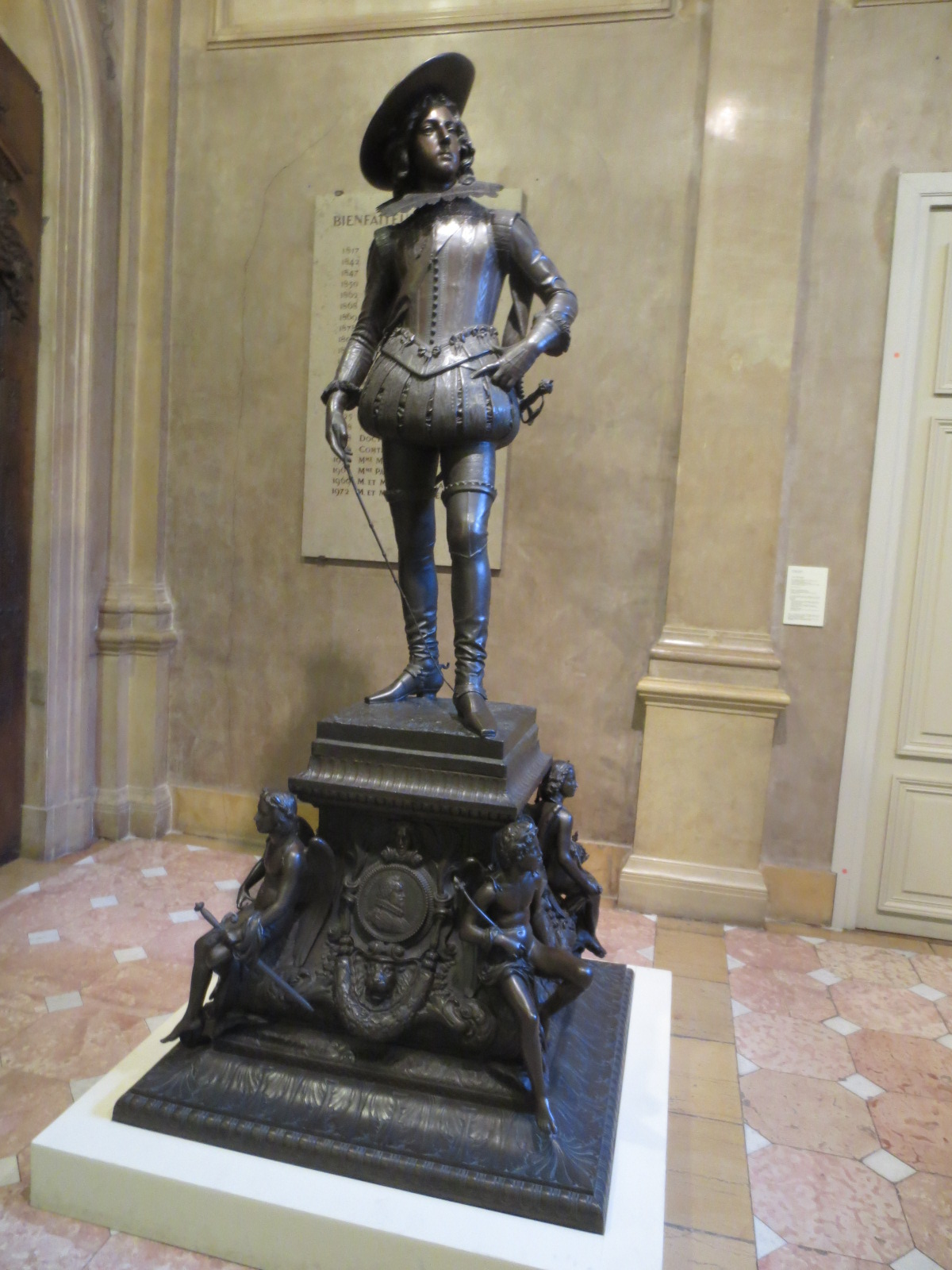
Rude's sculpture of the Louis XIII

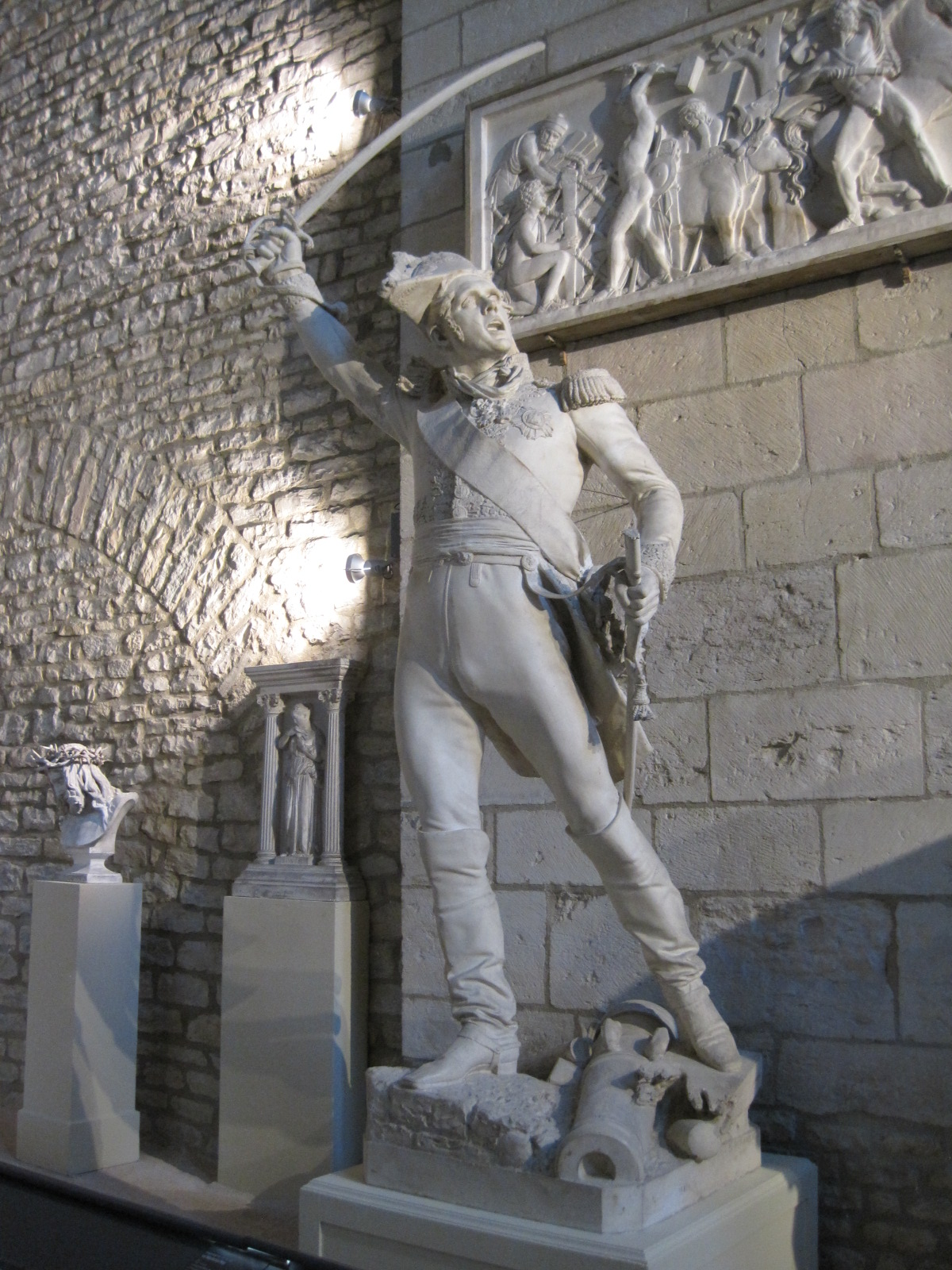
Plaster model of Rude's statue of Marshal Ney in the Musée Rude in Dijon

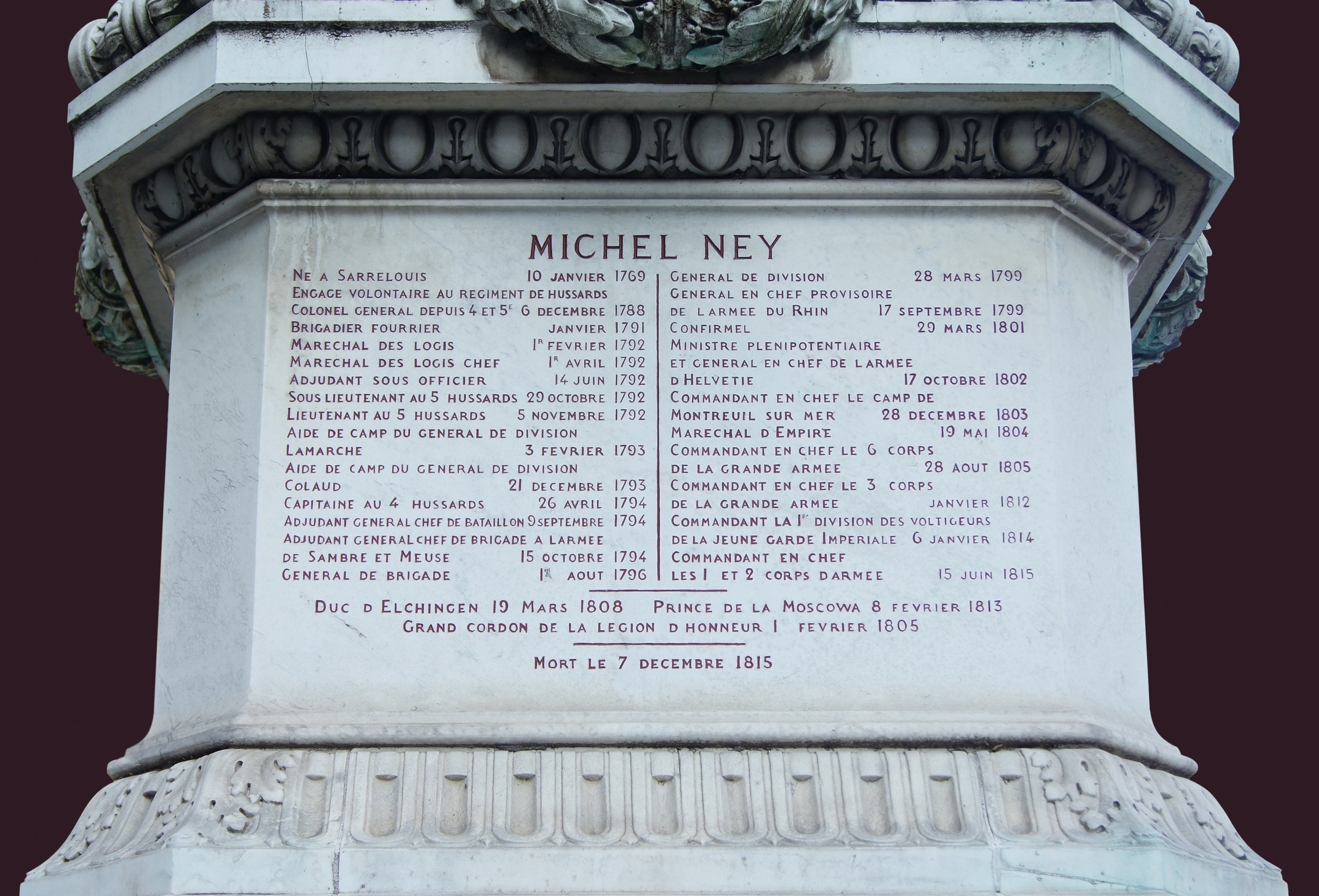
Summary of the career of Marshal Ney on the pedestal supporting by François Rude's statue of Ney in Dijon

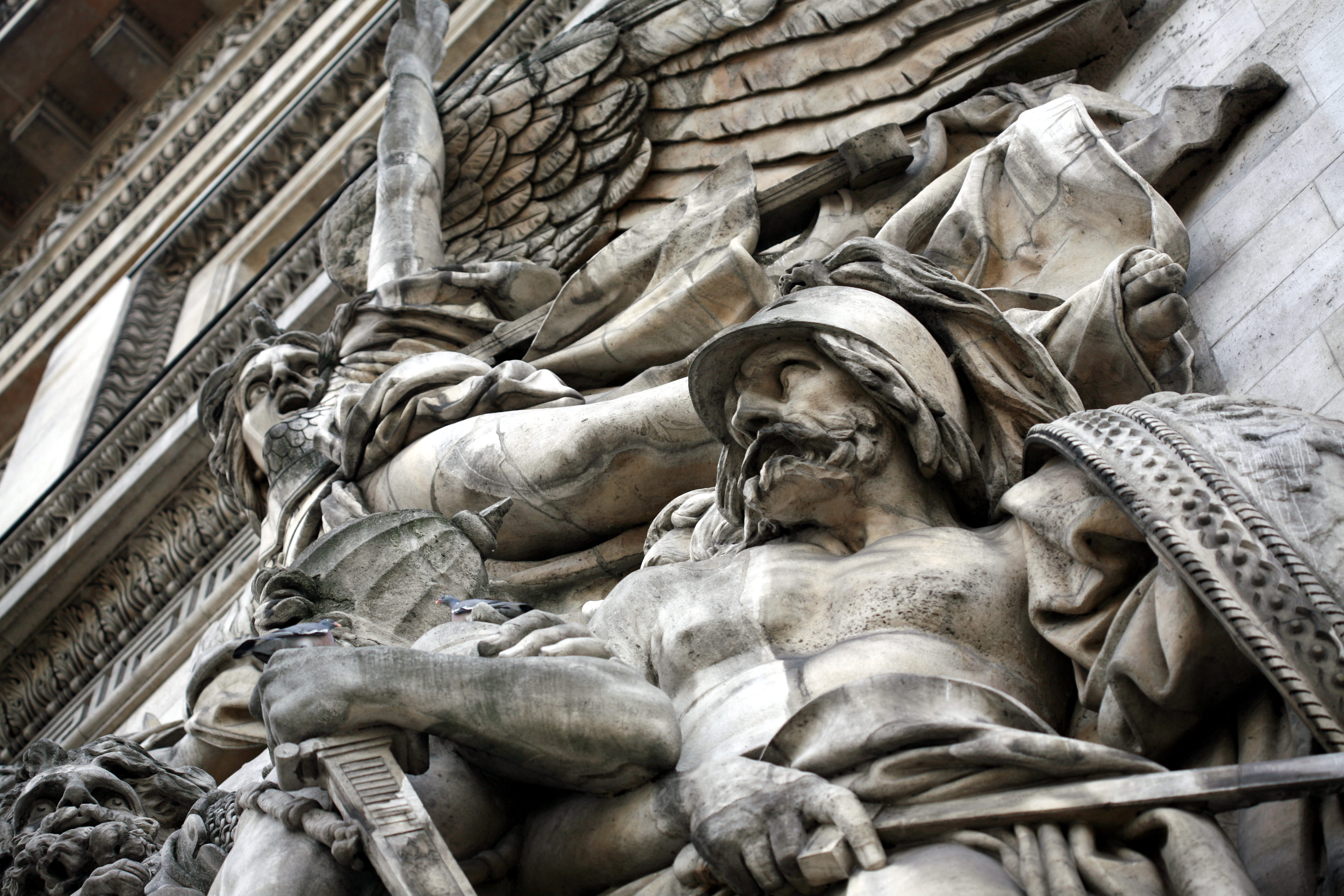
Detail from La Marseillaise by François Rude.

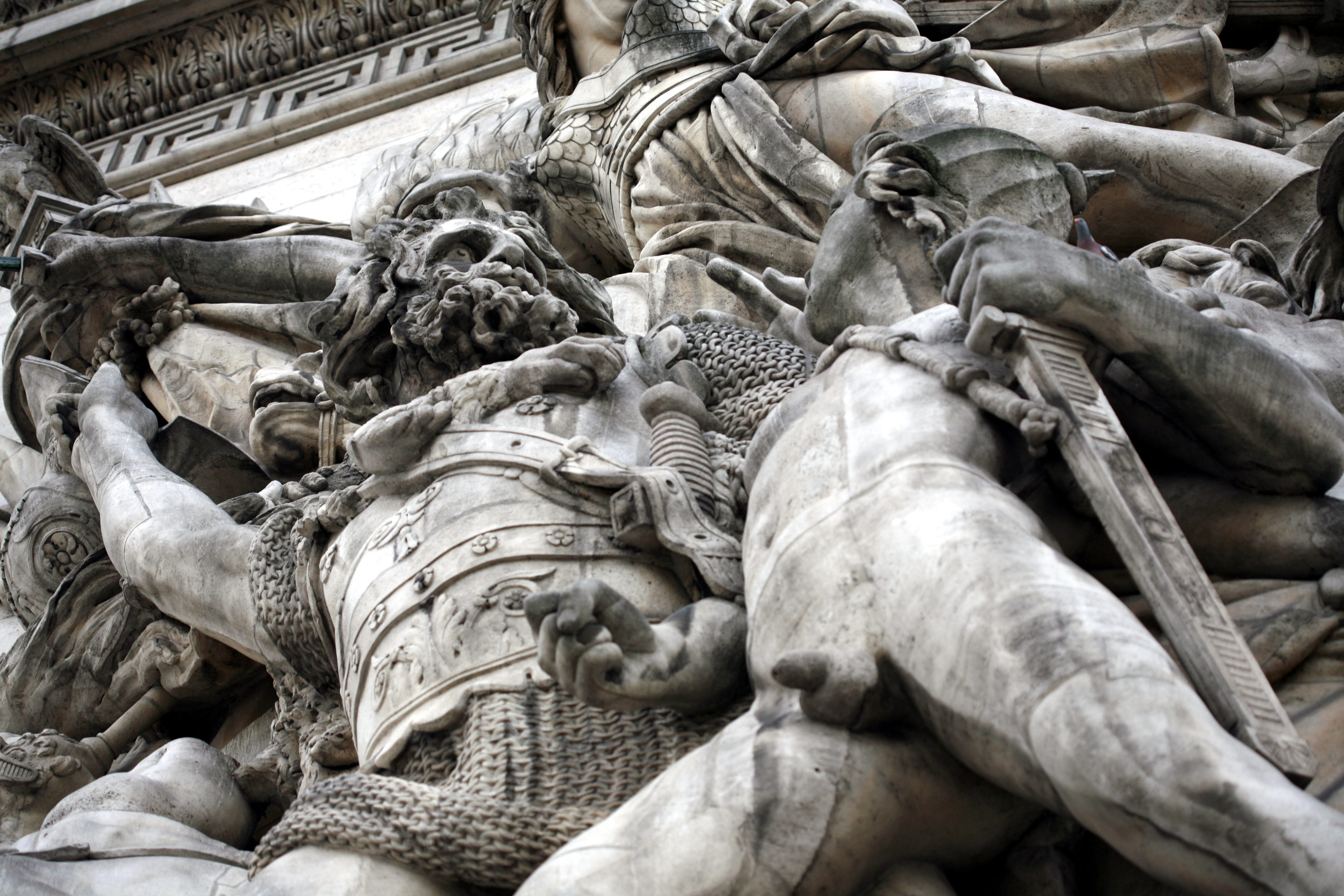
Detail from La Marseillaise by François Rude

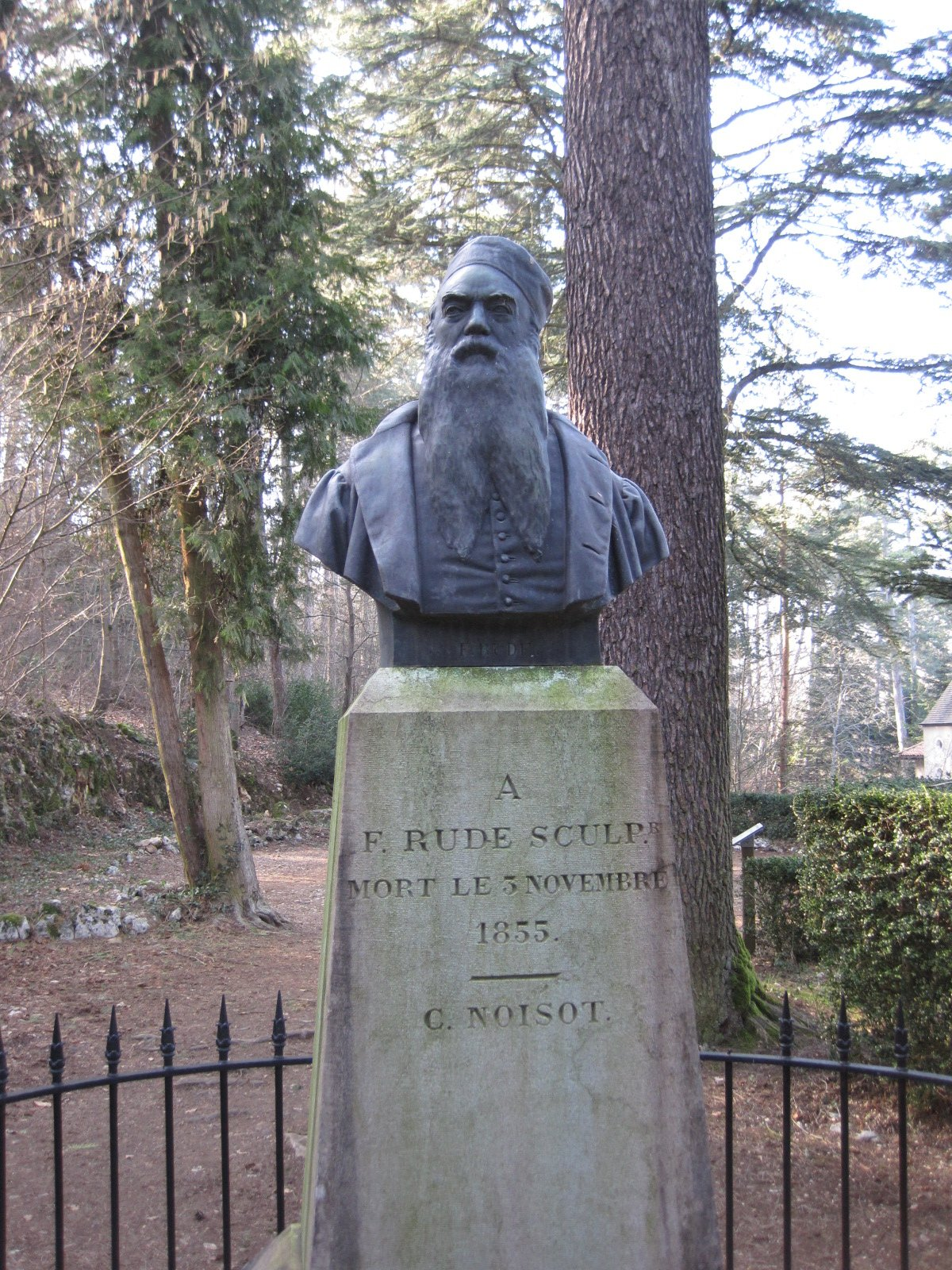
Bust of Rude in Parc Noisot by François Rude

== Recommended reading ==
Biography of Rude by Alexis Bertrand. Libraire de l'Art. Paris
