= Liénard =

Liénard is a surname. Notable people with the surname include:

- François Liénard de la Mivoye (1782–1862), French-Mauritian naturalist
- Édouard Liénard (1779–1848), French painter
- Alfred-Marie Liénard (1869–1958), French physicist and engineer
- Michel Joseph Napoléon Liénard (1810–1870), sculptor from France
- Daniel Liénard de Beaujeu, French officer during the Seven Years' War
- Yann Lienard (born 2003), French footballer
- Liénard–Wiechert potential describes the electromagnetic effect of a moving electric charge
- Liénard equation, type of differential equation, after the French physicist Alfred-Marie Liénard
