= Victor Mottez =

French painter (1809–1897)

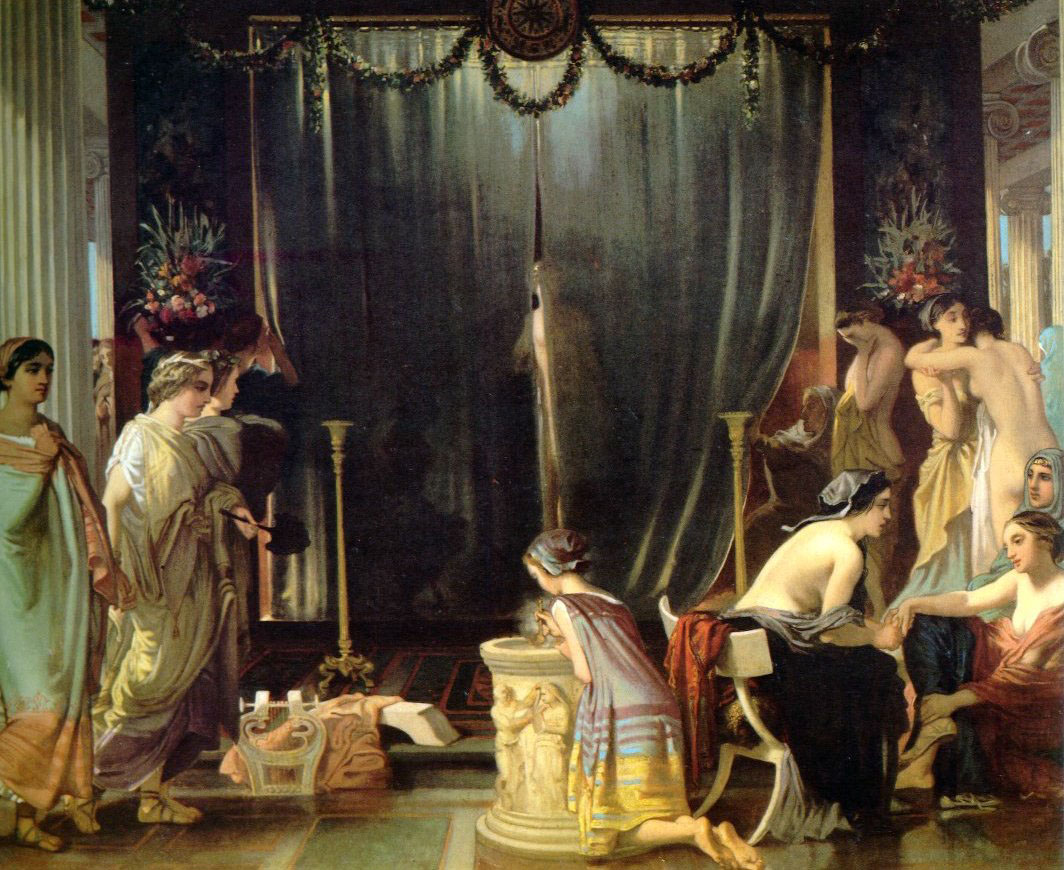
Zeuxis choosing his models (1858)

Victor-Louis Mottez (13 February 1809 – 7 June 1897) was a French fresco painter, painter and portraitist.

== Life ==
He was born in Lille. His father was passionate about art and was himself a painter. Sent to Paris with a pension for some years, Victor was recalled due to the poor state of his father's finances and his studies were cut short. He followed courses at the École de dessin in Lille and worked under the direction of his father and his father's painter friends such as Édouard Liénard, student of Jacques-Louis David. He returned to Paris from 1828 to 1829 to enter the École des Beaux-Arts and at first studied under the direction of François-Édouard Picot, then as a free student of Dominique Ingres.

The Mottez family was highly religious and devoted to the House of Bourbon, and so the July Revolution in 1830 came as a catastrophe to them. Victor was again recalled to Lille by his father and married shortly afterwards. From there he made many trips, of which the longest and most notable was that to Italy and he came to consider its old masters as the absolute masters of painting. In Rome he met Ingres again - Ingres liked him very much and often gave him advice. His Christ in the Tomb (now in the église Sainte-Catherine de Lille) and The Martyrdom of Saint Stephen (now in the église Saint-Étienne de Lille) date to this era. Also on this trip to Italy he became hugely interested in fresco art—Mottez painted his wife Julie in this medium and, showing Ingres the end result, pulled it off the wall at Ingres' request (it was later given to the Louvre by Mottez's two children).

Returning to France in 1838, he set up shop in Paris and exhibited at the Paris Salons, especially turning more and more towards the neglected genre of frescoes, notably religious ones. He also translated the Treatise by the 14th century Florentine painter Cennino Cennini and learned from his techniques. His most remarkable works are those for churches (at Église Saint-Germain-l'Auxerrois in the 1840s, and at the Saint-Séverin in the 1850s), which were admired by Ingres and Delacroix. However, the clergy's hostility to them, the materials used, the saltpeter walls and their situation all meant that they were already deteriorated by the end of the 19th century and are now largely lost (except for Saint Martin cutting his cloak in two at St-Germain l'Auxerrois), though Mottez's cartoons for them survive.

During the same years he frequented the Bertins' salon, alongside the main writers and artists of the time (a sketch of his for a portrait of Victor Hugo survives). He produced two frescoes for this salon, destroyed in 1854. After the 1848 Revolution Mottez set out for the United Kingdom, where he produced several portraits of British nobles and personalities and the exiled minister François Guizot, which were exhibited at the Royal Academy salons. He was an excellent portraitist throughout his career and it was that which mainly occupied him in the last years of his career. He returned to France in 1853 and worked with Delacroix at the Église Saint-Sulpice, at the start of the 1860s, where their highly opposed styles clearly showed the struggle between the neo-classical and romantic visions. Maurice Denis considered these frescoes at St-Sulpice (another Saint Martin) as "unforgettable". He designed the stained glass windows at the église Saint-Maurice de Lille.

== Marriage and issue ==
He married three times:

1. Julie Odevaere, a relation of the painter Joseph Denis Odevaere and through her mother related to a Belgian family of artists - she is known via Mottez's portraits in oil and the Italian fresco in Lille
2. Georgiana Page, whom Mottez married in the United Kingdom, and with whom he had a son (Henri-Paul Mottez, who also worked as a painter but died without issue)
3. Madeleine Joséphine Bonnasier, with whom he had another son, contre-amiral Jean Mottez (1866–1942), who became director of the fleet's military personnel, commander of the Mediterranean schools and sous-chef d'État-Major général of the Navy, and who had many descendants

Victor Mottez died on 7 June 1897 in Bièvres.

== Works ==
=== Frescoes ===
- Fresco portrait of Julie, now in the Louvre (painted in Rome, 1837)
- Frescoes of saint Germain l'Auxerrois" (1839–47)
- Chapel of saint François de Salles, église Saint-Séverin (1853–1857)
- Chapel of saint Martin, église Saint-Sulpice (1859–1863)
- Hunting and Fishing for his former brother-in-law Mr Page's salon in his country house (c 1865)
- Decor for the salon of Urbain le Thierry, at Lille (destroyed in war).
- Decor for M. Bayard
- With Amaury Duval, the decor of Amaury-Duval's château, the château de Linières (c 1880).
- Portrait of Henry Mottez as a child, 1865 Salon, musée Vivenel de Compiègne

=== Portraits ===
- Portrait of Madame Mottez (1837)
- François Guizot in London (1849), Royal Academy salon (1849), Paris Salon (1853) (private collection)
- Mme Armand Bertin (1843), Salon of 1845
- Maria, known as Lilie, and Louise Mottez, Victor's sisters (c. 1833-1834) (private collection)

=== Cartoons ===
- For stained-glass windows, in collaboration with the Lille-born master glass-stainer Charles Gaudelet

=== Other paintings ===
- The Resurrection of the Dead (1870)
- Medea,
- Ulysses and the sirens
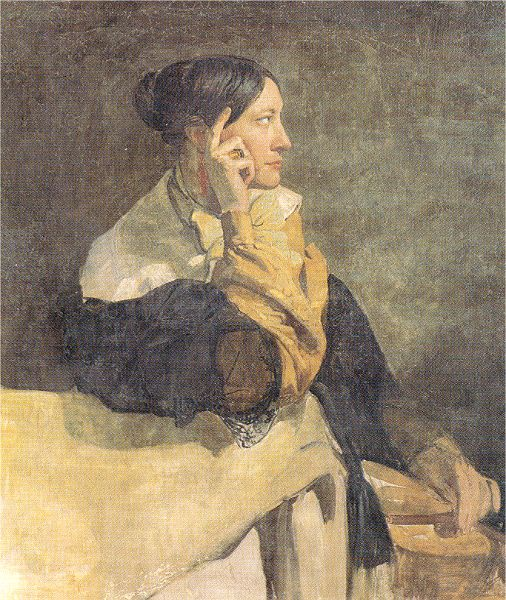
Portrait of Madame Mottez (1837)

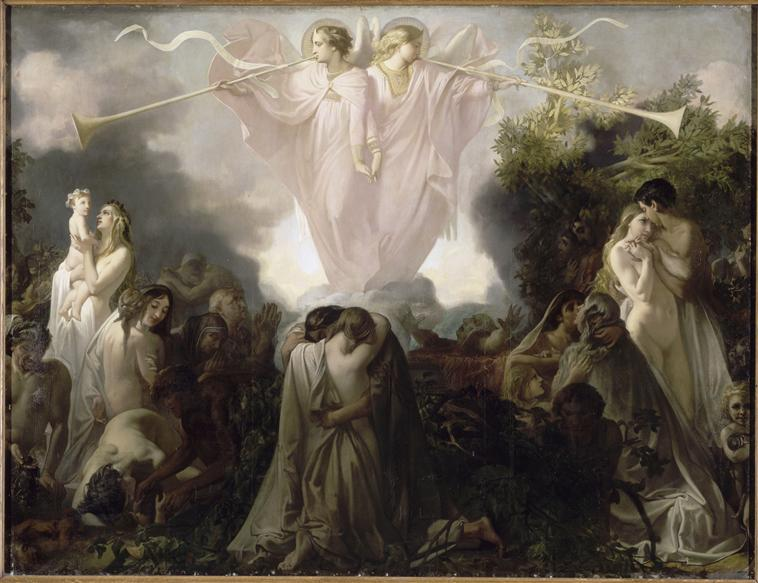
The Resurrection of the Dead (1870)

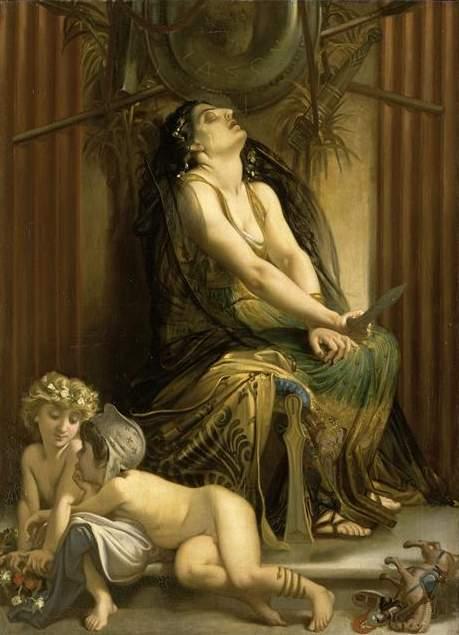
Medea

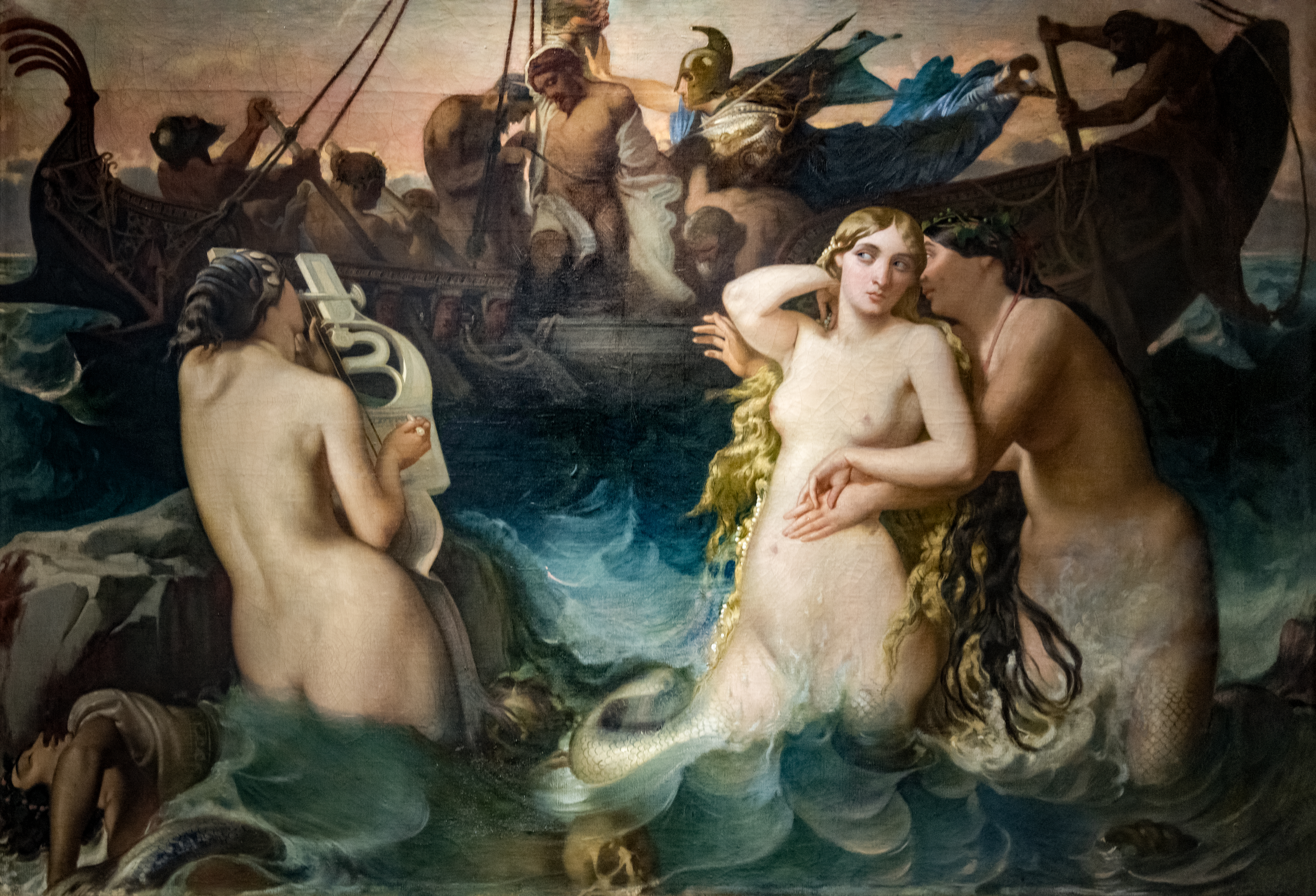
Ulysses and the sirens

== Bibliography ==
- (in French) René Giard, Victor Mottez, Lille, 1934
