= Henri-Paul Mottez =

French painter

Henri-Paul Mottez (1855–1937) was a French portrait painter and artist.

== Life ==
He was born in London 1855 to Victor Mottez and his second wife, Georgina Page. Henri-Paul was trained in the Académe Julian under Jules Lefebure, and ultimately entered the École des Beaux-Arts under Lehmann. The Mottez family was highly religious and devoted to the House of Bourbon, and so the July Revolution in 1830 came as a catastrophe to them. Henri-Paul Mottez died in 1937.

Henri-Paul Mottez's painting of his father's studio 'In the Studio of the Artist, Oil on Canvas' was auctioned at Christie's New York, in 1989.

== Family ==
1. His father, Victor Mottez, French fresco painter and portraitist, born in Lille.
2. His mother, Georgina Page, whom Victor Mottez married in the England.
3. His step-brother, contre-amiral Jean Mottez (1866–1942), who became director of the fleet's military personnel, commander of the Mediterranean schools and sous-chef d'État-Major général of the Navy, (Knight of the Legion of Honor 10 July 1901, Officer of the Legion of Honor 27 February 1913, Croix de Guerre) and who had many descendants.

== Portraits ==
- Portrait of Victor Mottez (1809-1897) Oil on Canvas. Painting signed Henri Mottez. Current ownership of National Museum of the Palace of Versailles and Trianon, Versailles acquired 1932.
- Portrait of the painter Edmond Labrador, Oil on Canvas. Painting Signed H. Mottez, dated 1855. Current ownership of Bordeaux Museum of Fine Arts, acquired 1945.
- Portrait of contre-amiral Jean Victor Mottez (1866–1942) Oil on Canvass. Painting signed Henri Mottez, dated 1837.
- Portrait of Una Jovan, Oil on Canvass. Painting signed H. Mottez.
- Portrait of Jeune bretonnes Huile sur toile, Oil on Canvass. Painting Signed H. Mottez
- In the Studio of the Artist, Oil on Canvas. Depicting his father Victor Mottez, together with his brother Jean Mottez and himself. Painting signed Henri Mottez, circa 1890–95.
