= Charles Gaudelet =

French glass maker

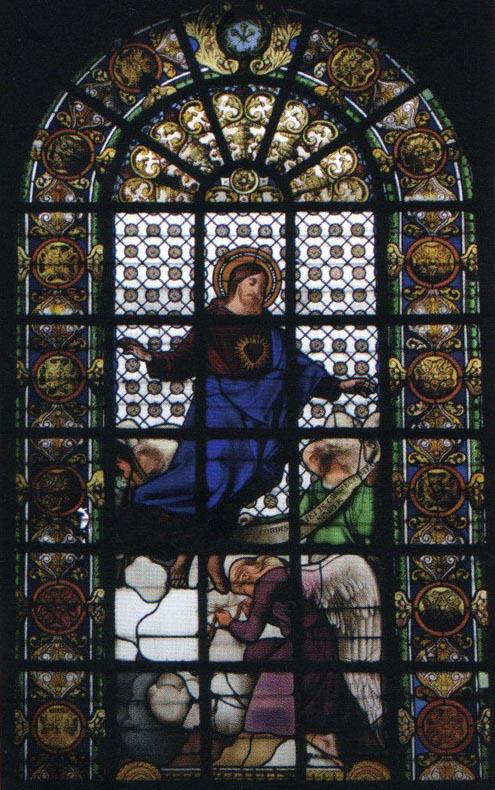
“Ascension du Christ” stained glass window by Charles Gaudelet in the Church of Saint-Étienne in Lille, France.

Charles Gaudelet (1817–1870) was a French master-glass-maker from Lille. The painter Victor Mottez worked exclusively with him, and Gaudelet also worked occasionally with Bruno Chérier. In 1847, he created stained glass for the Église Saint-André de Lille based on designs by Joseph Hussenot. From 1854 to 1859, he collaborated with Mottez on creating the stained glass for the Church of Saint-Étienne, also in Lille.

The cartoons from his studio were acquired by the musée des Beaux-Arts de Lille in 1870 at the instigation of the painter and collector Camille Benoît.
