= Jean Victor Mottez =

French naval officer

Jean Victor Mottez (31 October 1866 in Paris – 7 December 1942 in Saint Gervais D'Auvergne) was a French naval officer.

== Life ==
He was born in Paris 31 October 1866 to Victor Mottez and Madeleine Joséphine Bonassier. He entered the French Naval Academy in 1884. He married 14 June 1899 to Jeanne Louise Dupr, with whom he had three children. Jean Mottez died in Saint Gervais d'Auvergne 7 December 1942.

== Family ==
1. His father, Victor Mottez, French fresco painter and portraitist, born in Lille.
2. His step-brother, Henri-Paul Mottez (1855–1937), who was a French portrait painter and artist.
3. His wife, Jeanne Louise Dupr, married in 1899, Lorient.
4. First child (son), Yves Mottez 1900–1987.
5. Second child (son), Louis Victor Henri Mottez 1901–1976.
6. Third child (daughter), Suzanne Marie Gabrielle Mottez 1903-Unknown.

== Naval career ==
He entered the French Naval Academy in 1884.

- Aspirant, 5 October 1887, Officer Cadet
- Ensign, 26 November 1889, Port Cherbourg
  - 1 January 1892, on the battleship Admiral-Baudin Wing western Mediterranean and Levant (Cdt. Marchal).
  - 1 January 1894, Port Cherbourg
  - 1 January 1896 for instruction in the School of Naval Fusiliers in Lorient.
- Lieutenant, 27 October 1896, Fusilier commission officer
  - 1 January 1897, on battleship coastguard Jemmapes, North wing (Cdt. Henri Manceron).
  - 1 July 1898, responsibility for the shooting school at the School of Naval Fusiliers in Lorient.
  - 1 January 1900, Borda Naval Academy, Port Brest
  - 1 January 1902, on the battleship Bruix North Wing (Cdt. Jules le Pord).
  - 6 March 1903, commander of the shooting school at the School of Naval Fusiliers in Lorient.
  - 1 January 1908, on the cruiser-battleship Pothaua, School of Application Naval Fusiliers (Cdt. Pierre Le Bris).
  - 18 May 1908, Commander of the torpedo boat Oriflamme.
  - 25 April 1910, 4th Section of the General Staff, Paris
- Commander, 13 February 1911
  - 1 January 1912, on the battleship 'Voltaire', first aide de camp to the Vice-Admiral Augustin Boué de Lapeyrère, Commander 1st Naval Force.
  - Awarded Officer of the Legion of Honor 27 February 1913.
  - 1 January 1914, Commander of the destroyer 'Commandant Riverére'. Mentioned in dispatched from the Naval Fusiliers 1915: 'Commander of the 6th Squadron torpedo boat participated in more than ten refueling operations in Montenegro during which he assured an effective way of protecting minesweepers and convoys. Showed a lot of decision making and composure in the maneuvers he ordered to his squadron, especially on 1 November 1914 when his squadron was attacked for more than half an hour by three planes'. Awarded the Crois de Guerre.
- Captain, 11 April 1916
  - 1 January 1917, Port Cherbourg
- Commodore, 13 October 1920
  - 1 January 1921, Deputy Chief of General Staff of the Navy, Paris
  - Awarded Commander of the Legion of Honor, 10 July 1921
  - 1 January 1932, under reserve

== Honours ==
- Knight of the Legion of Honor (1901)
- Officer of the Legion of Honor (1913)
- Croix de Guerre (1915)
- Commander of the Legion of Honor (1921)

== Portraits ==
- Portrait of contre-amiral Jean Mottez (1866–1942) Oil on Canvass. Painting signed Henri Mottez, dated 1837.
- In the Studio of the Artist, Oil on Canvas. Depicting his father Victor Mottez, together with his brother Jean Mottez and himself. Painting signed Henri Mottez, circa 1890–95.
