= Roman Baroque =

Roman Baroque may refer to either:

- Styles in Rome of any form of the arts in the Baroque period, roughly from 1600 to the late 18th century. Rome was a leading centre for Baroque architecture and Baroque painting in particular.
- Styles in ancient Roman art and Roman architecture, mainly of the middle Imperial period, where many aspects of the modern baroque style are also found.
