= Church of Saint-Étienne, Lille =

Coordinates: 50°38′06.57″N 03°03′35.23″E

- Eglise Saint Étienne
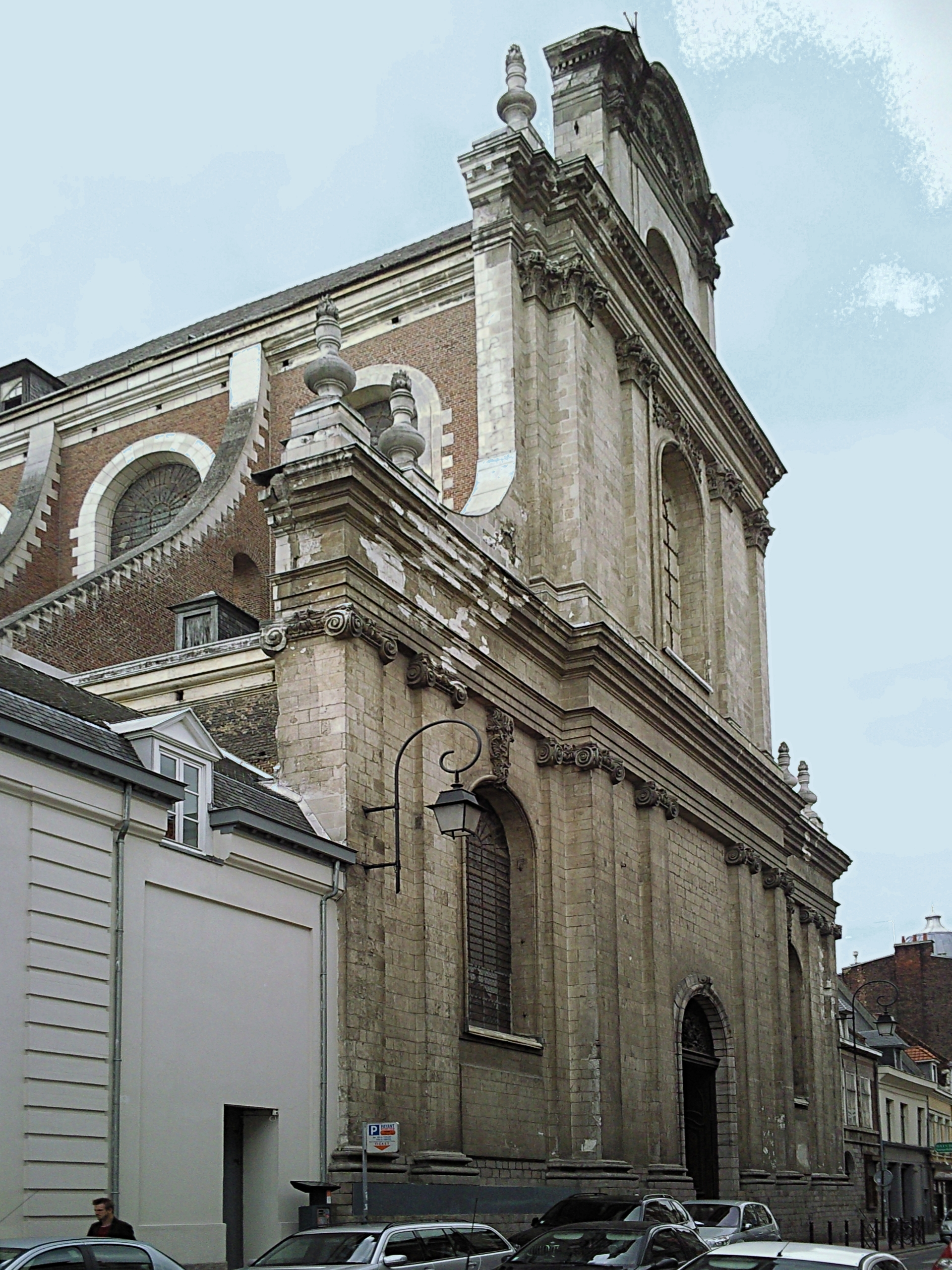
- Church of Saint-Étienne, Lille
- Location: Lille
- Country: France
- Denomination: Roman Catholic Church

History
- Founded: 1743

Architecture
- Heritage designation: Monument historique
- Designated: 1987
- Architect: Dominique Delesalle; François-Joseph Gombert
- Architectural type: church
- Style: Roman Baroque
- Completed: 1748

Specifications
- Height: 57 m

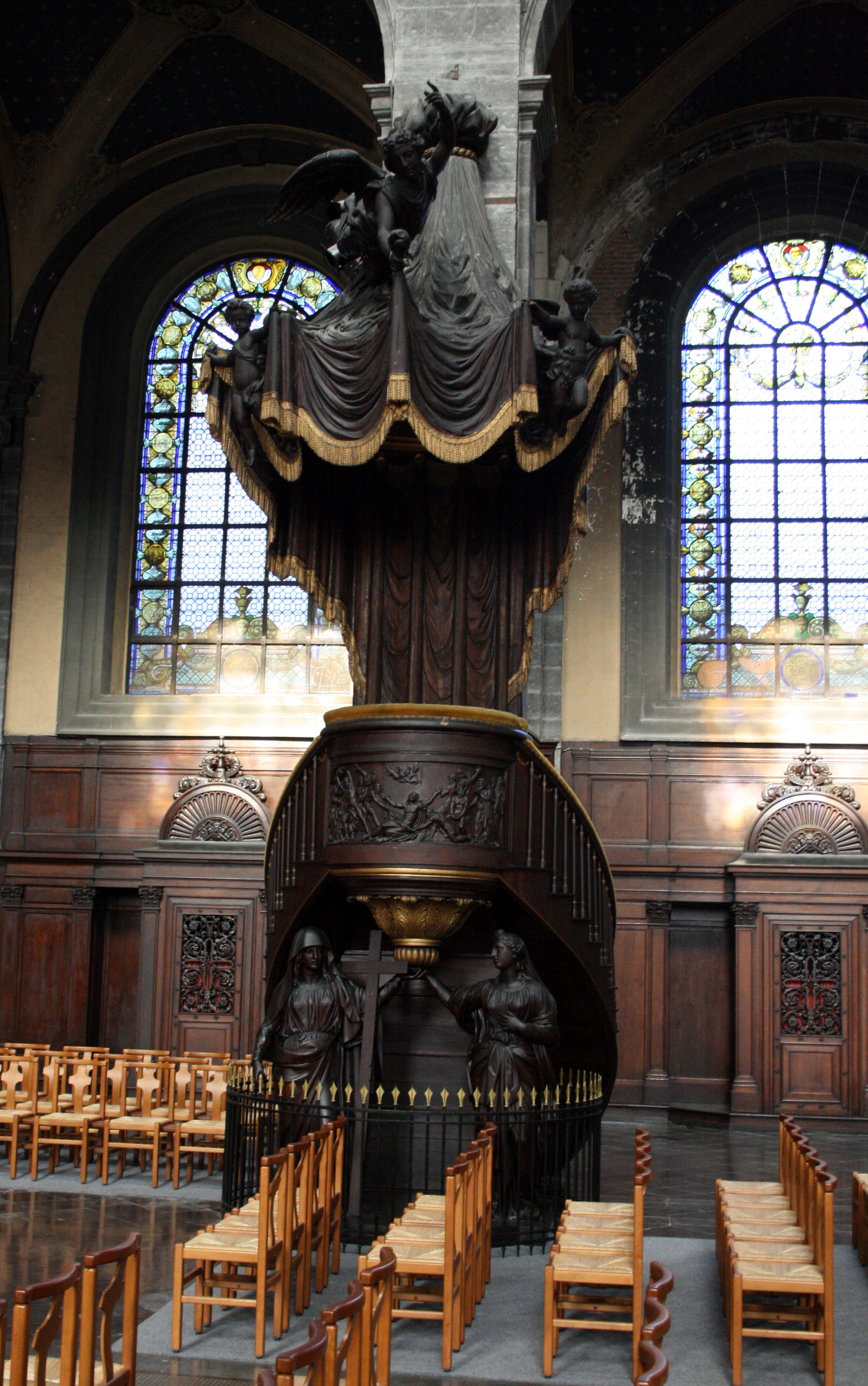
Pulpit by François Rude

The Church of Saint-Étienne (French: Église Saint-Étienne) is a Roman Catholic church located on the Rue de l'Hôpital Militaire in Lille, France. It has been classed as a monument historique since 1987 and is dedicated to Saint Stephen. It is one of the largest Jesuit churches in France.

== History ==
=== First building ===
The first parish church of this name was on the north corner of the city's Grand'Place (as shown by the names of the streets in that area: Rue Saint-Étienne, Rue des débris Saint-Étienne and Rue du curé Saint-Étienne) and mainly dated to the 14th and 15th centuries. It was richly endowed by the Hangouart family, whose main members served the dukes of Burgundy. It was a Dutch-style hall church with two aisles and a nave, with many chapels along both sides of the nave. It was destroyed by fire in 1793 during the Austrian siege of the city, and replaced in 1796 by the present church.

=== Current building ===
The present parish church originated as a Jesuit chapel. The Jesuits set up a base in Lille in 1562 and they were put in charge of the municipal collège built in 1529 on the decision of the city magistrate. The Jesuits' chapel of the immaculate conception (now the parish church of Saint-Étienne) was built from 1605 to 1610, but then destroyed by fire on 8 October 1740. From 1743 onwards François-Joseph Gombert rebuilt it to plans by Dominique Delesalle and, though works were delayed in 1744 by the War of the Austrian Succession and in 1745 by the siege of Tournai, they were finally completed in 1748 and the new building consecrated by the bishop of Tournai in 1750. The Jesuits were expelled from France in 1765, on which the chapel became the chapel of the collège and of the military hospital which took over the collège from 1778.

== Description ==
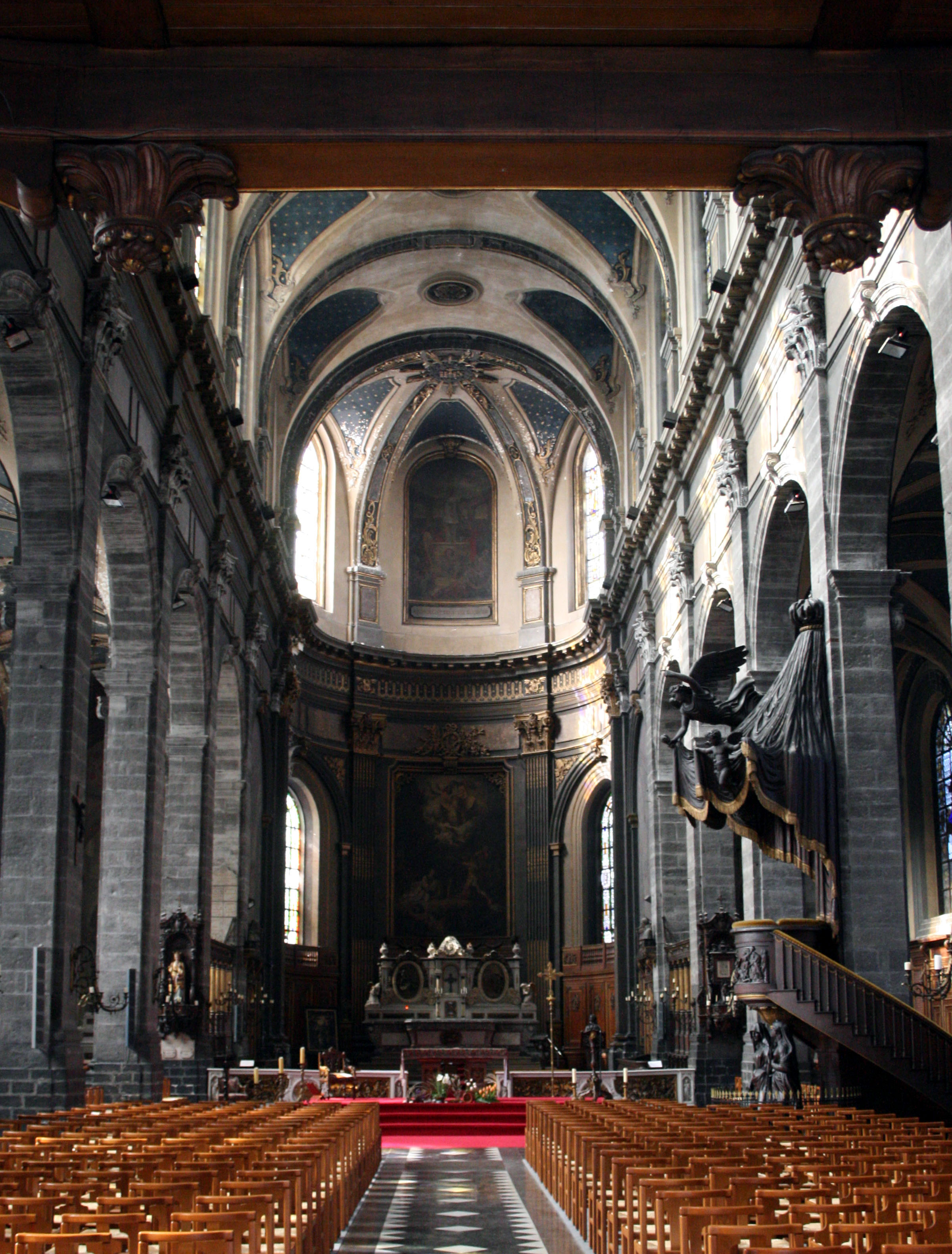

The church's stone façade is 29m high and its height is accentuated by the very straight Rue de l'Hôpital militaire. Its style is resolutely classical and inspired by the Roman Baroque, with two superimposed orders (Ionic order at the bottom, Corinthian order at the top). A 57m high square bell tower topped with a campanile is to the left of the choir. The church's interior is 61m long, sobre, light and on a Latin cross plan. The nave has 7 bays, with side chapels all along the aisles, and the choir extends the nave and ends in a semi-circular apse. The choir and aisles are covered by an ogive vault and the nave by a barrel vault. The black and white marble flooring comes from the former chapel and the stained glass windows by Charles Gaudelet between 1854 and 1862.

The pulpit was carved by the sculptor François Rude between 1825 and 1828. It is made up of a tent topped by an angel and cherubs, with Faith and Hope supporting a vessel adorned with a bas-relief of St Stephen's martyrdom. The 1840 organ was built by the Daublaine Callinet house. It has been modified four times (by Cavaillé-Coll in 1899 then by Mutin in 1901) and now has 39 jeux, 3 keyboards and pedals.

== See also ==
- List of Jesuit sites

== Bibliography ==
- Alain Lottin, Lille, Citadelle de la Contre-Réforme ? 1598-1668.
