= Édouard Liénard =

French painter (1779–1848)

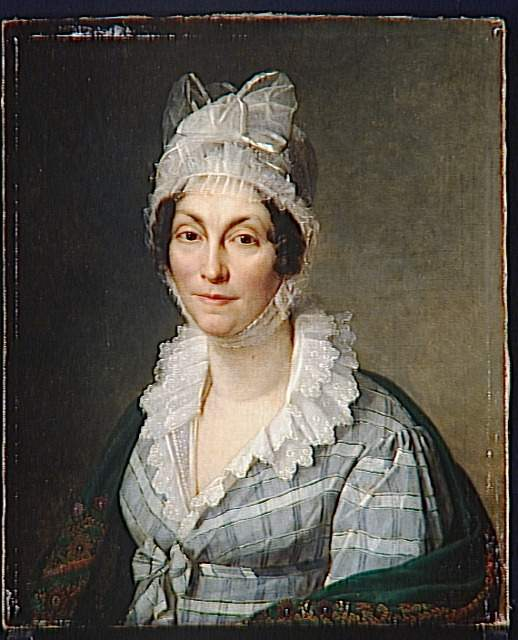
Portrait of Aldégonde Bathilde Mallet (1815)

Jean Auguste Édouard Liénard (1779 in Paris – 10 February 1848 in Lille) was a French painter. He signed his works E.Liénard or J.Liénard.

A student of Regnault, Isabey and David, and worked for a long time as a painter of miniatures and portraits in Lille, where he succeeded François Watteau in 1823 as professor at the école des arts. He also worked for the Manufacture nationale de Sèvres from 1828 to 1833. His own students included Victor Mottez.
