= Notre-Dame-de-la-Croix de Ménilmontant =

- Our Lady of the Holy Cross of Ménilmontant
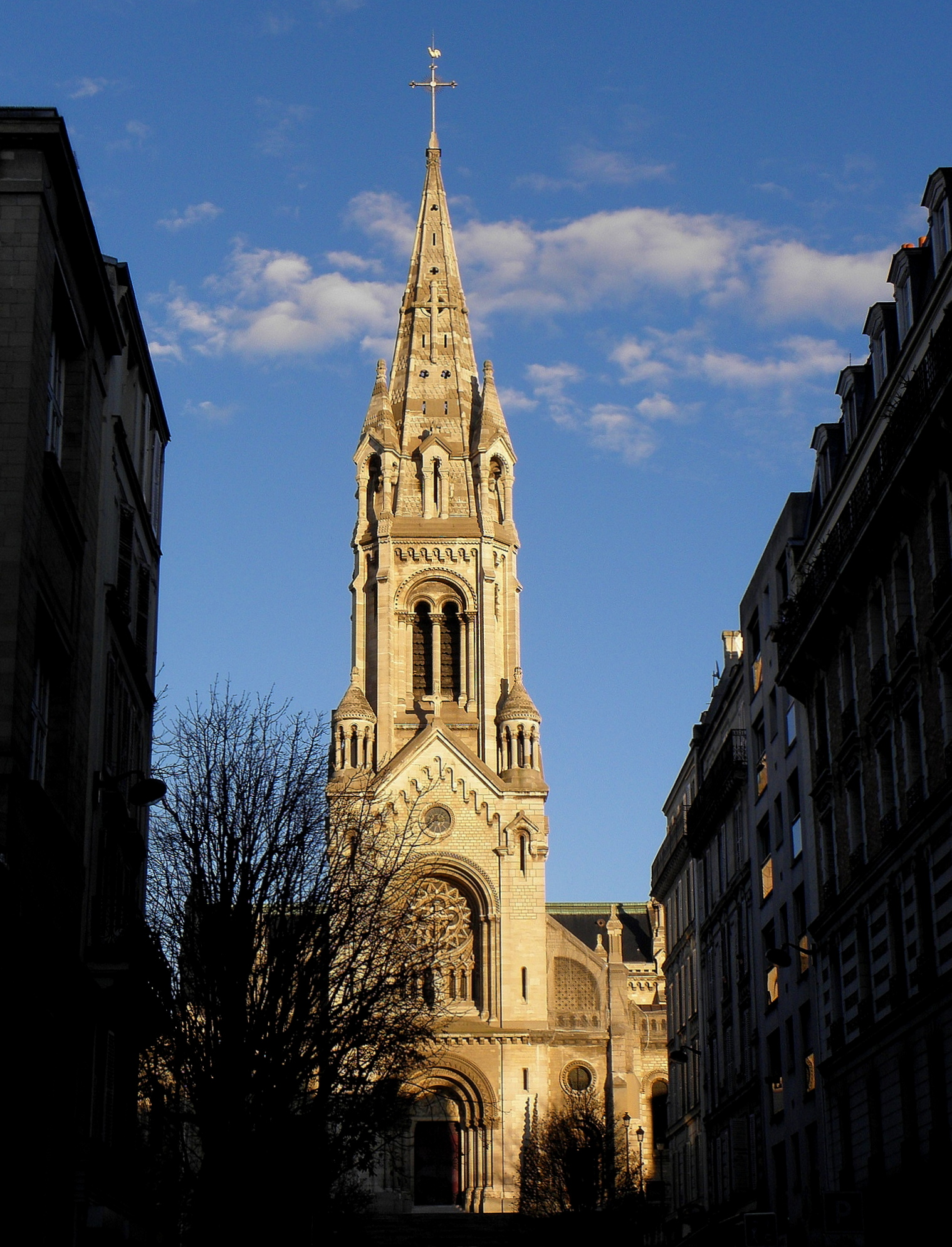
- Notre-Dame-de-la-Croix de Ménilmontant
- 48°52′5.54″N 2°23′12.68″E
- Location: 20th arrondissement of Paris
- Country: France
- Denomination: Roman Catholic Church

History
- Status: Parish church
- Consecrated: 1869

Architecture
- Functional status: Active
- Architect: Antoine Héret
- Architectural type: church
- Style: Neo-Gothic, Neo-Roman
- Groundbreaking: 1863
- Completed: 1880

Specifications
- Length: 97 m (318 ft 3 in)
- Width: 38 m (124 ft 8 in)
- Height: 20 m (65 ft 7 in) in the vault of the nave

Administration
- Archdiocese: Archdiocese of Paris

Notre-Dame-de-la-Croix de Ménilmontant (French pronunciation: [nɔtʁə dam də la kʁwa d(ə) menilmɔ̃tɑ̃]; meaning Our Lady of the Holy Cross of Ménilmontant) is a Roman Catholic parish church located in Ménilmontant, in the 20th arrondissement of Paris, France. It was built between 1863 and 1880. Of exceptional height and length, it is one of the largest churches in Paris.

== History ==
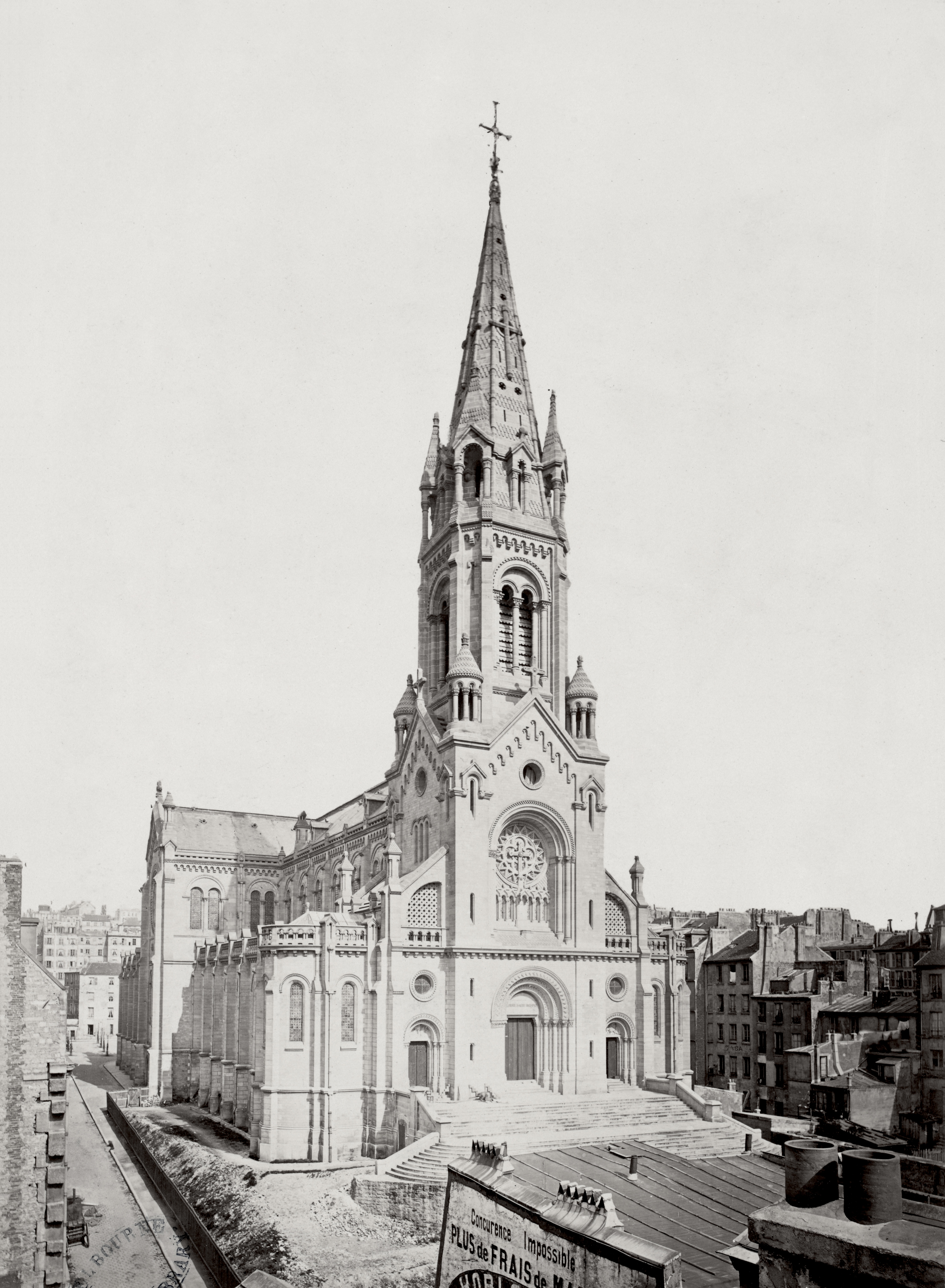
Photograph by Charles Marville (1860s)

Prior to the 19th century, the hamlet of Ménilmontant depended on the parish church of Saint-Jean-Baptiste de Belleville. Responding to population growth in the largely working-class neighbourhood, in 1833 the parish priest commissioned the construction of a larger chapel, and a new parish was established in 1847.

In 1869, Menilmontant was annexed to the city of Paris by Napoleon III. It continued to grow, so construction of a larger church started in 1863, designed by the architect Louis-Jean-Antoine Herét (1821-1899). It was consecrated in 1869, though the building was not yet complete.

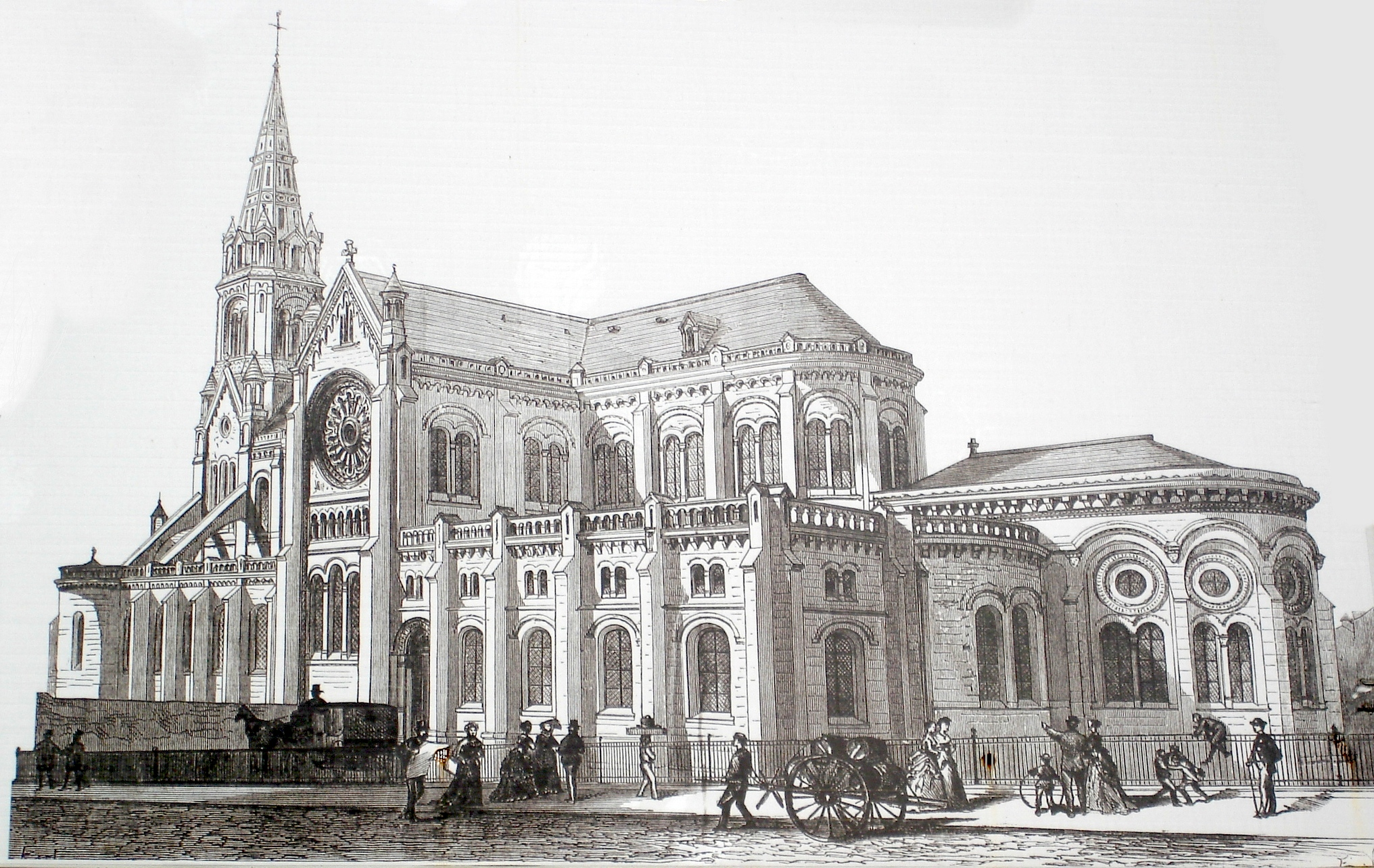
The church at the end of the 19th century

In 1871, during the Paris Commune, the church was closed and turned into a political meeting hall. In a meeting of Commune leaders held in the church on 6 May 1871, during the recapture of Paris by the French army, the Commune leaders voted to execute Georges Darboy, the Archbishop of Paris and a group of priests being held as hostages by the Communards.

Construction of the church was completed in 1880.

== Exterior ==
The church combines elements of Gothic architecture with Romanesque architecture.

The church is unusually large; it is 97 meters long, making it the third-longest church in Paris; 30 meters wide, and 20'9 meters in height up to the vaults of the nave. In volume, it is the fourth largest church in Paris. The bell tower is 78 meters high.

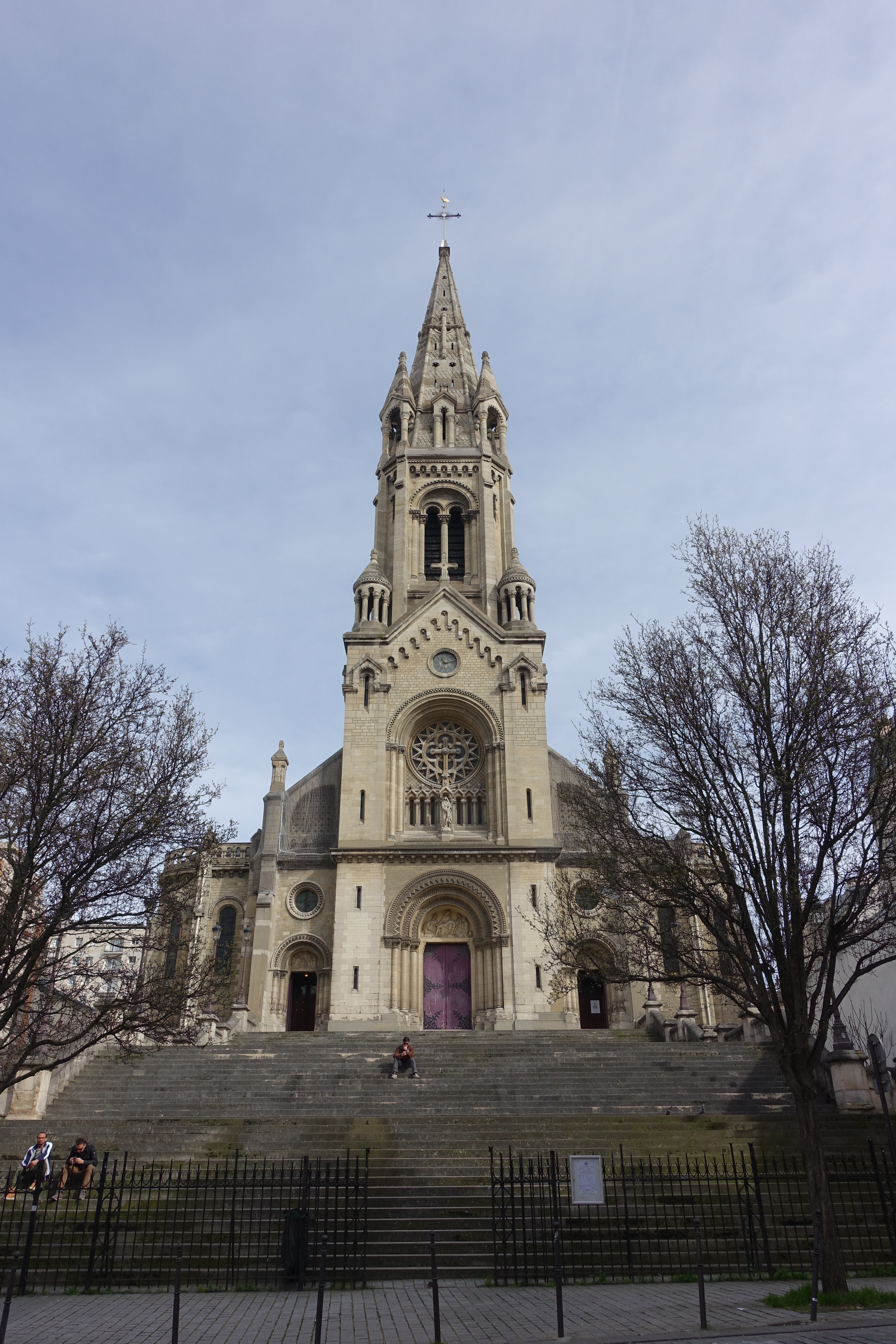
Facade and stairway to the street below

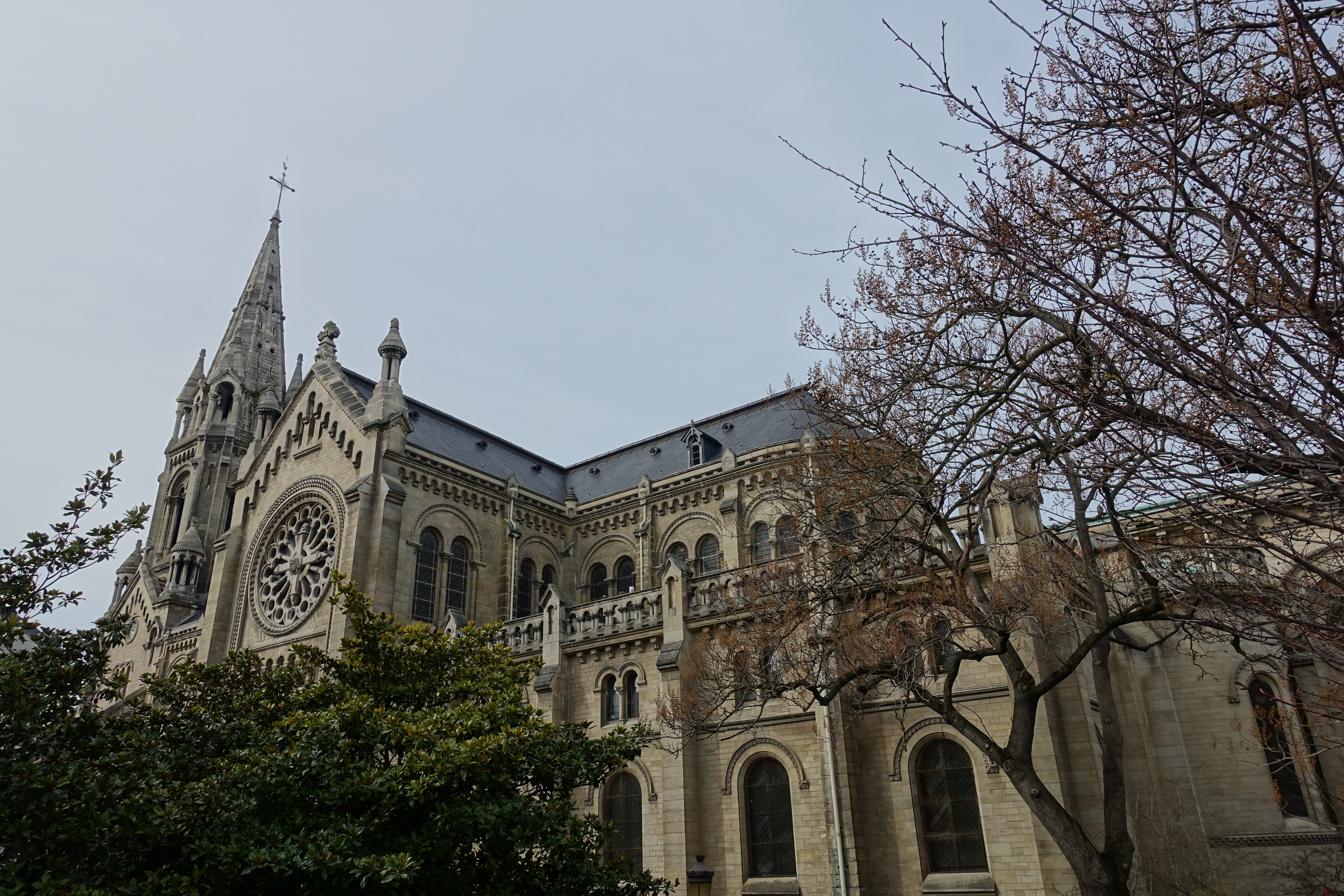
transept and side of nave

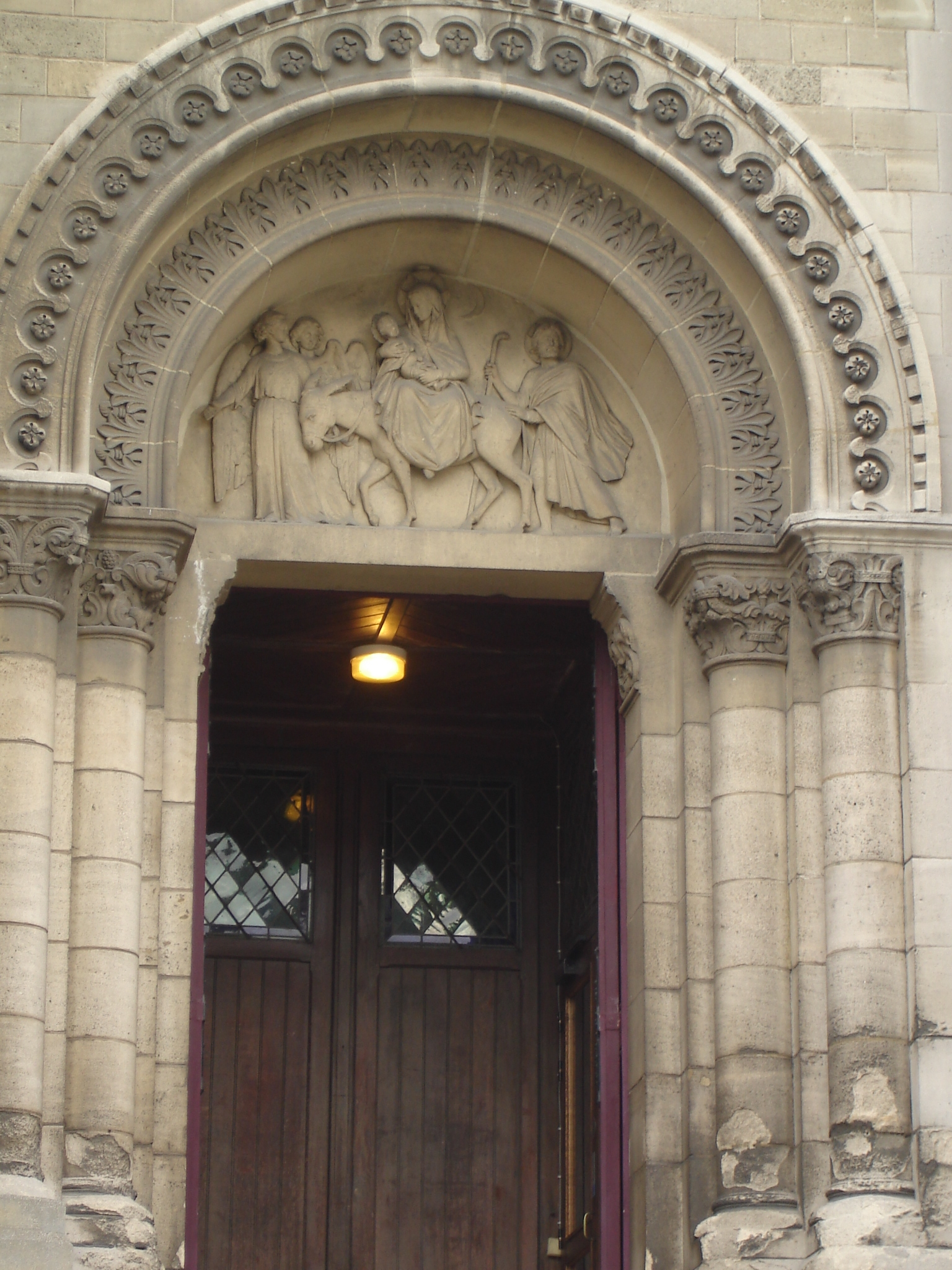
Tympanum of right portal with sculpture of "The flight into Egypt" by Louis Chambard (1811-1891)

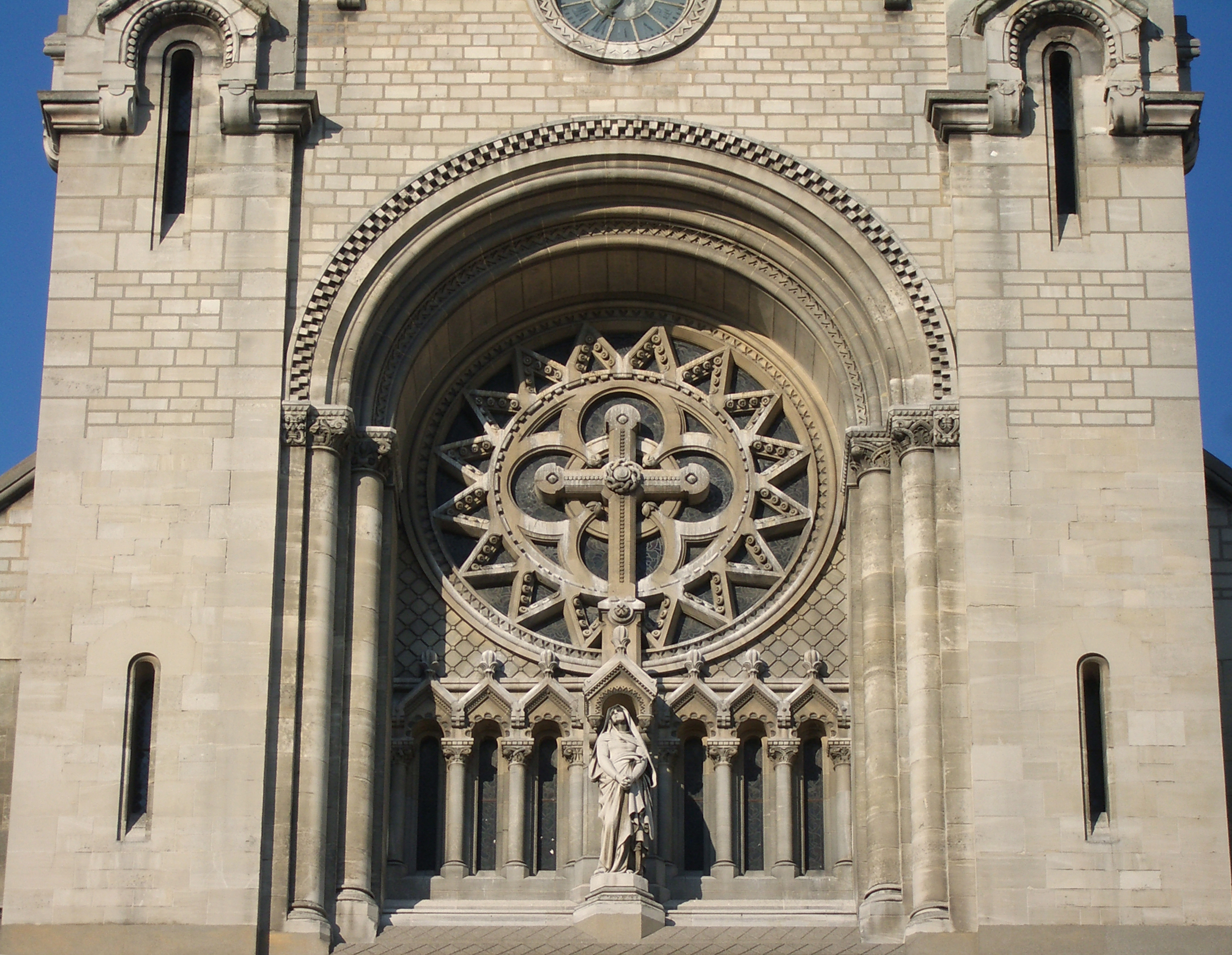
Rose window and statue of the Virgin Mary above the central portal

The site is also unusual, since the church is placed atop a steep hill, a long stairway of fifty-five steps connects the portal of the church with the street below.

== Interior ==
The interior decoration is predominantly neo-Romanesque, presented in the grand scale of earlier Gothic cathedrals. In addition to the classical elements, the interior has one unusual modern feature: the iron ribs supporting the ceiling vaults are fully exposed. The rest of the iron framework of the church is concealed by masonry.

The narthex at the entrance of the church is lined by very tall classical columns topped with Corinthian capitals, with very elaborate traditional sculptures of leaves and flowers, as well as small, sculptured heads of men and women supporting the bases of the rounded arches.

The columns of the arcade have capitals in floral design, as well as smaller heads of Saints. Each column is also decorated with a stylized illustration of the events of the Way of the Cross and the Crucifixion of Christ. Small chapels line the outer aisles behind the arcades. A chapel is devoted to Joan of Arc, decorated with a statue of Joan and a painting of the martyrdom of Saints Crispin and Crispinian, the patron saints of leatherworkers, shoemakers and weavers.

A triforium or passageway is located above the side aisles, and above are bays containing large stained glass windows with geometric designs. The windows were designed to admit a maximum of light. In the apse on the left is a chapel dedicated to Saint-Benoit-Joseph-Labre, patron saint of the homeless.

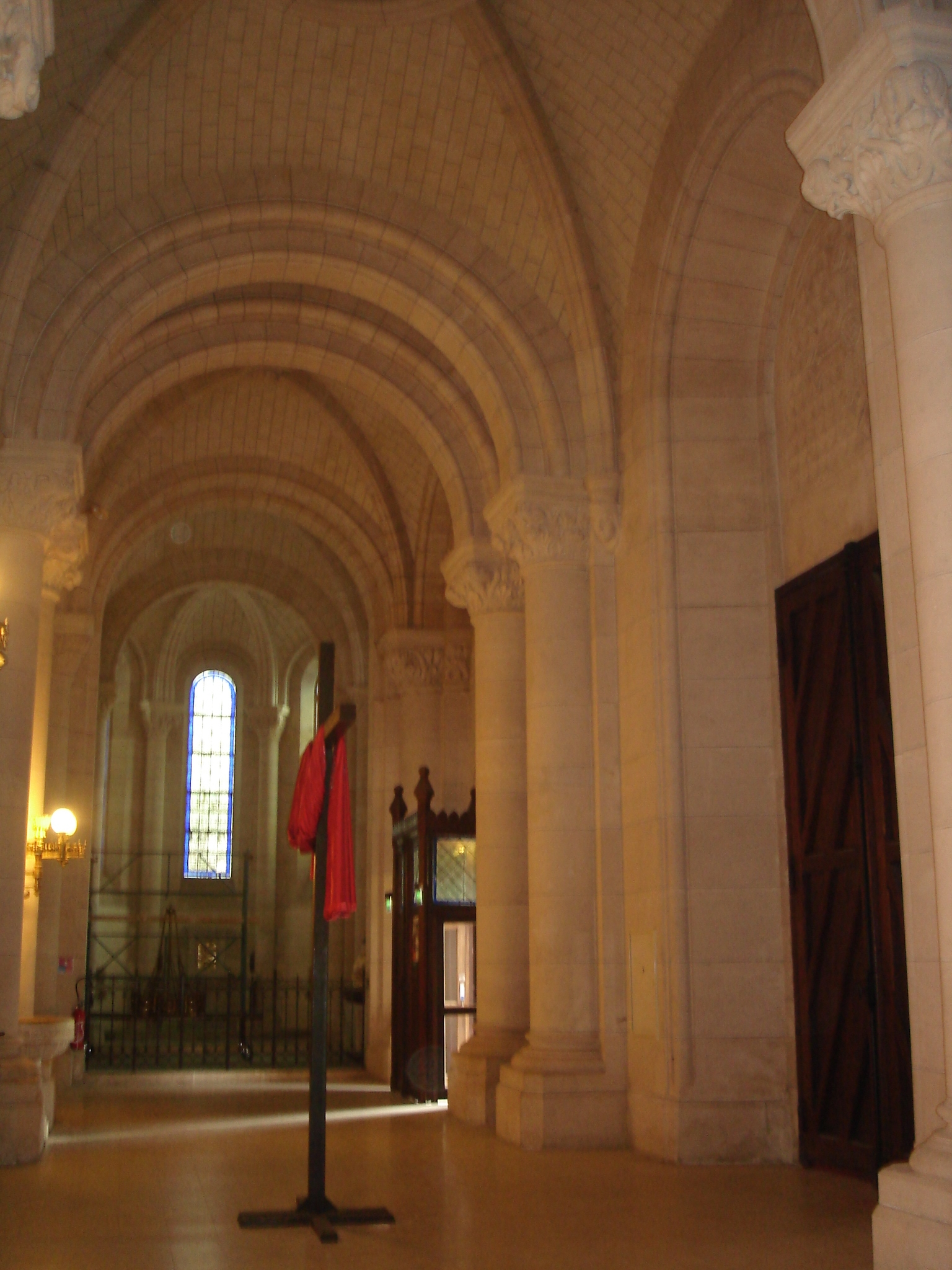
The Narthex inside the entrance

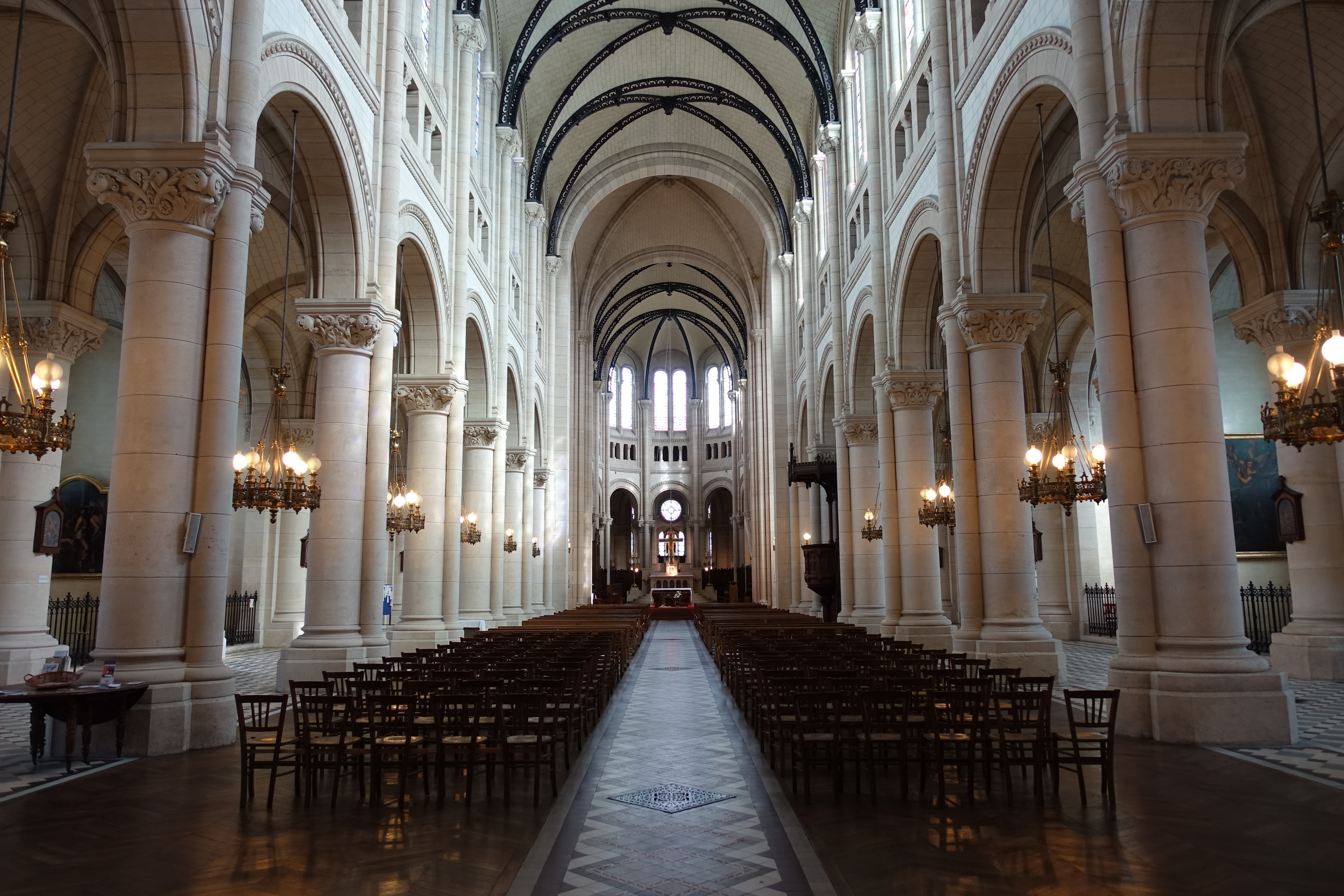
The nave facing the choir

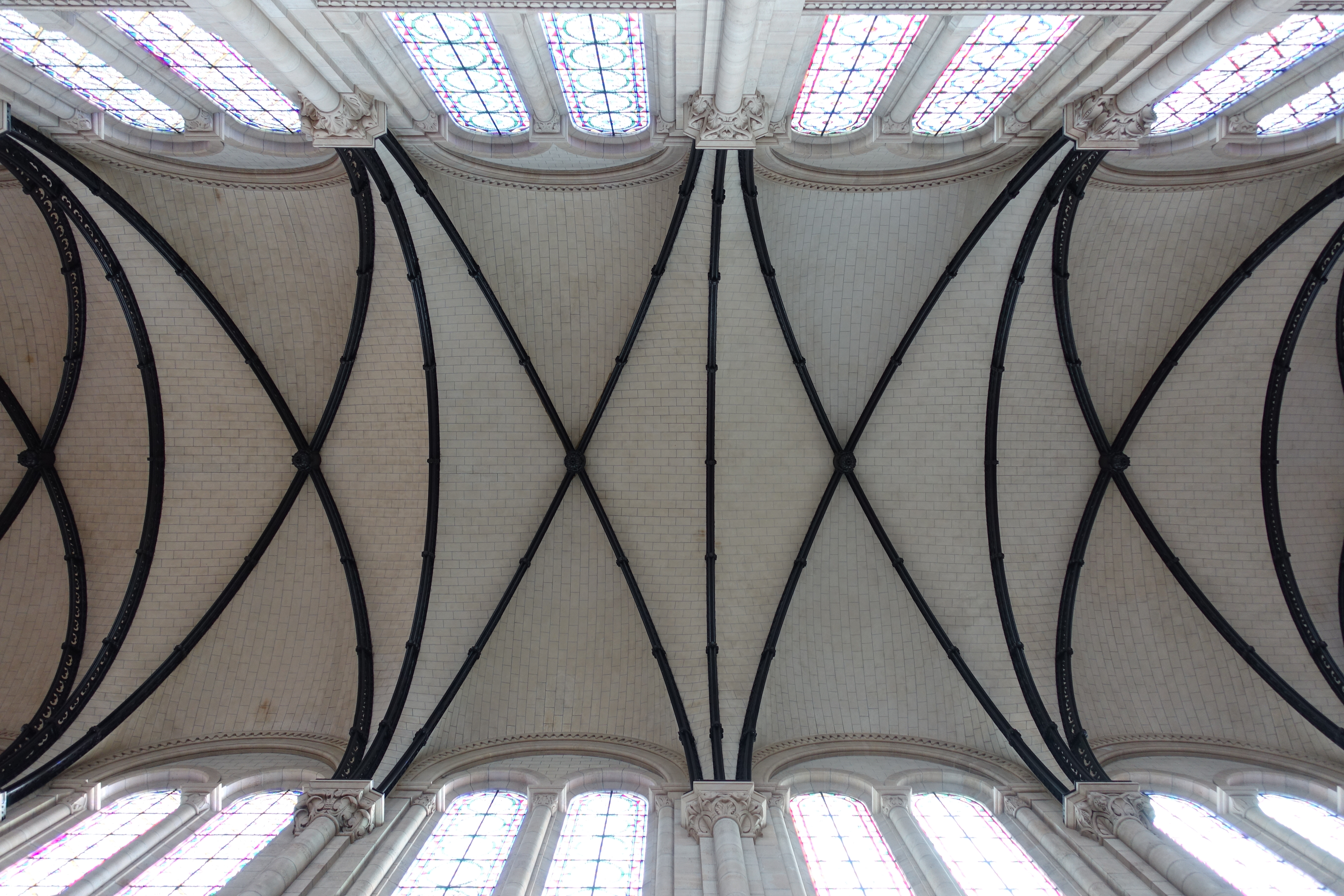
The exposed iron ribs of the vaults

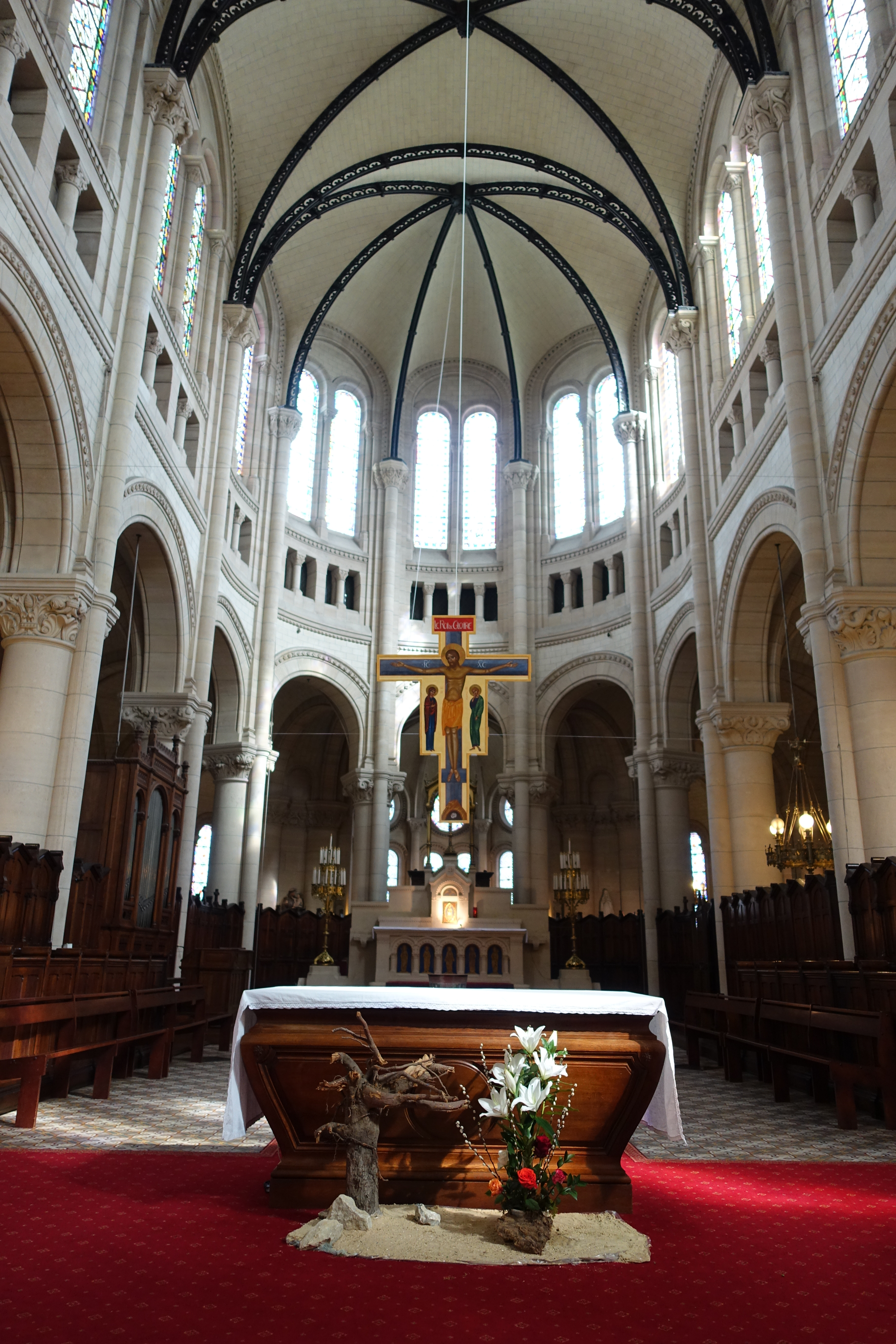
The Choir and altar

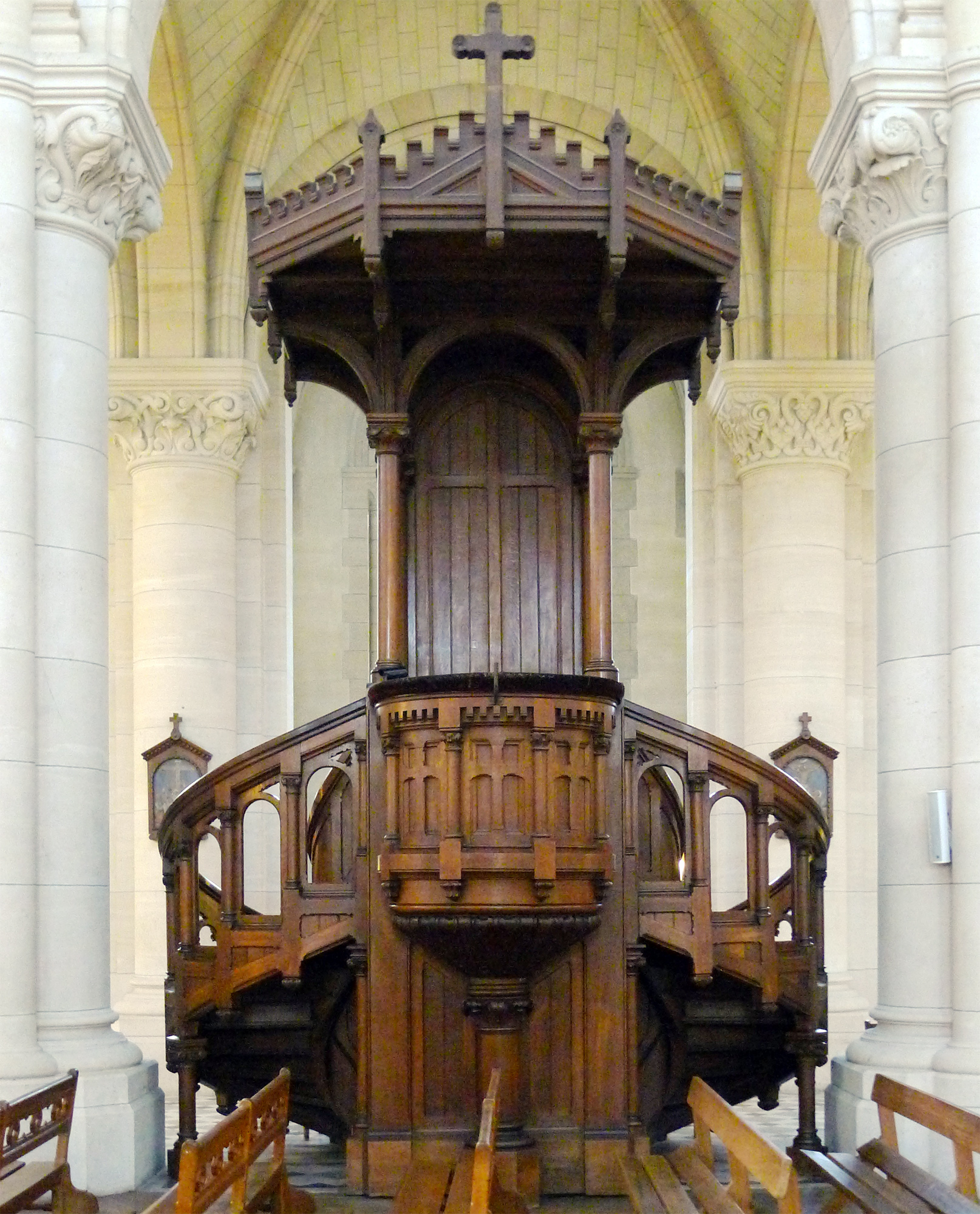
The pulpit in the nave

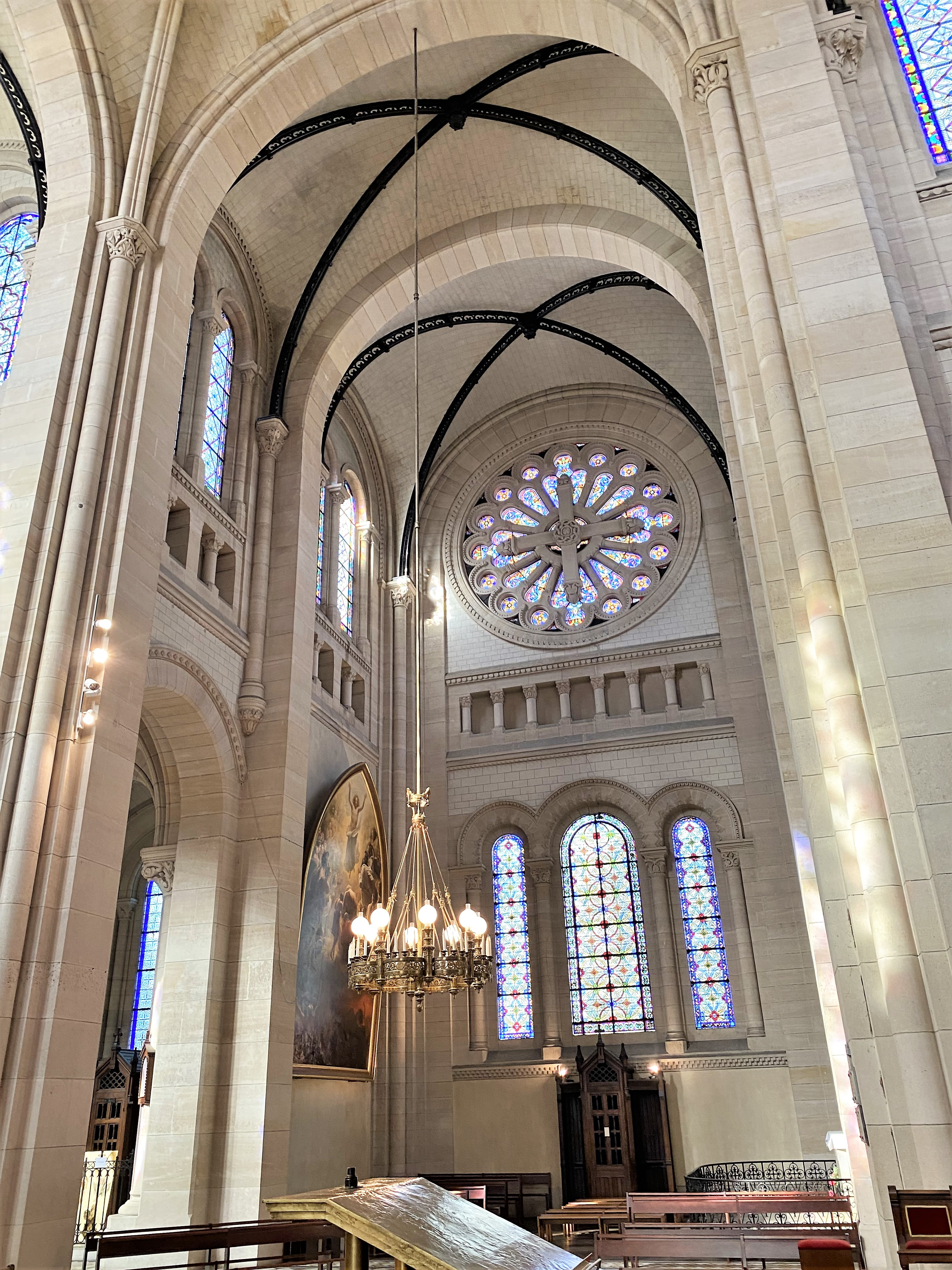
The transept, with small rose window

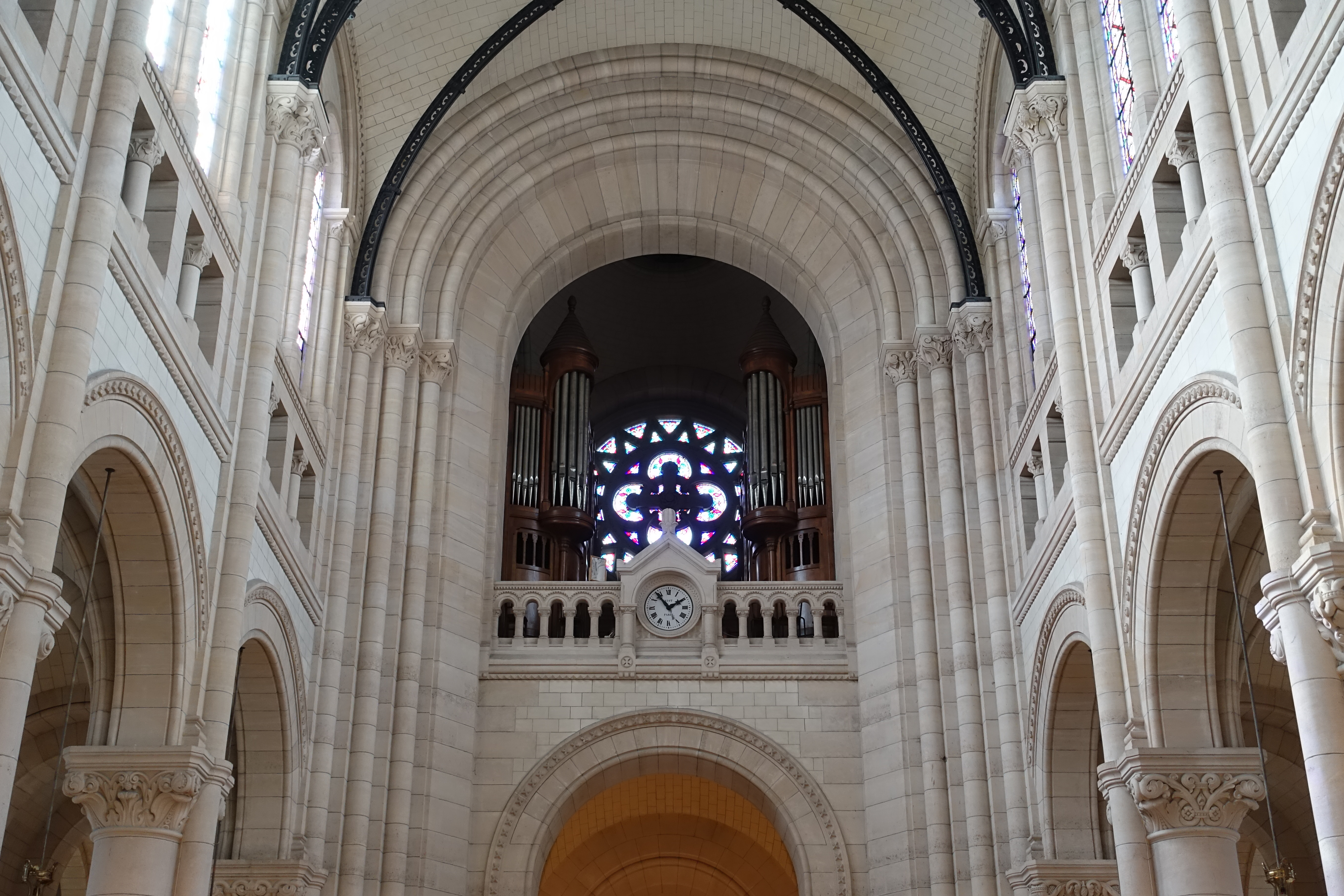
The organ in the tribune over the church entrance

== Art and Decoration ==
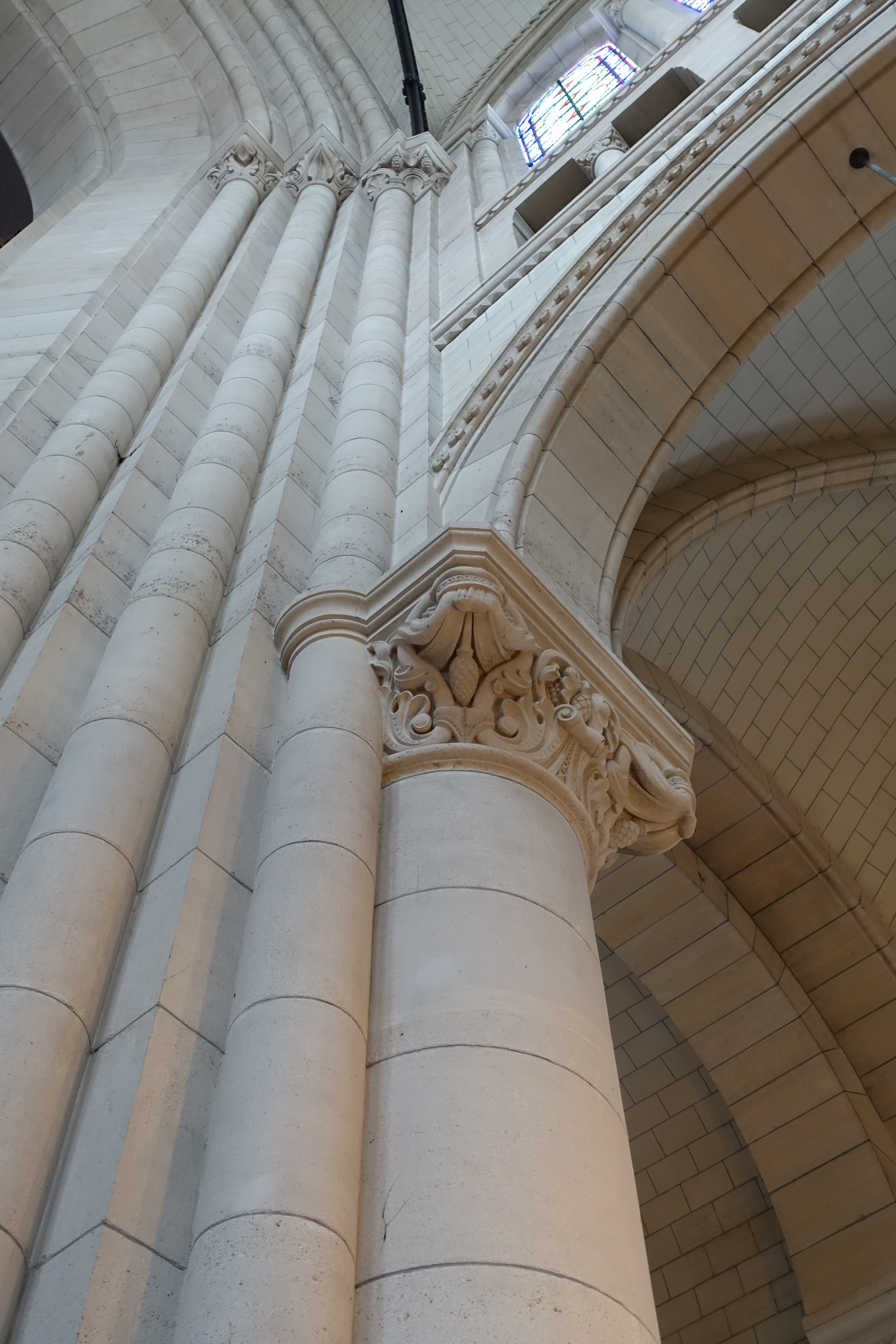
Detail of column capital in the narthex

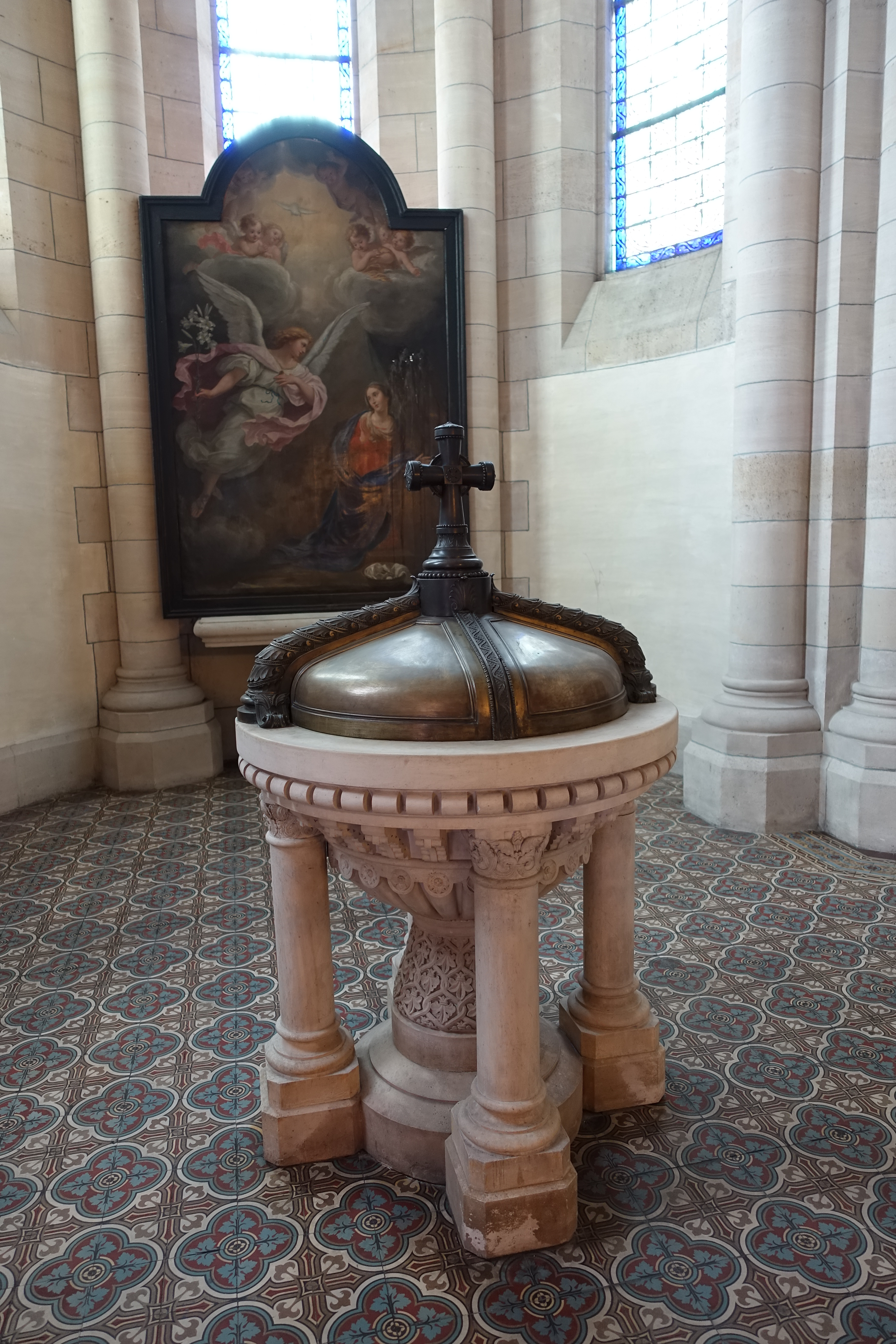
Baptismal Chapel and Font, with painting "The Annunciation

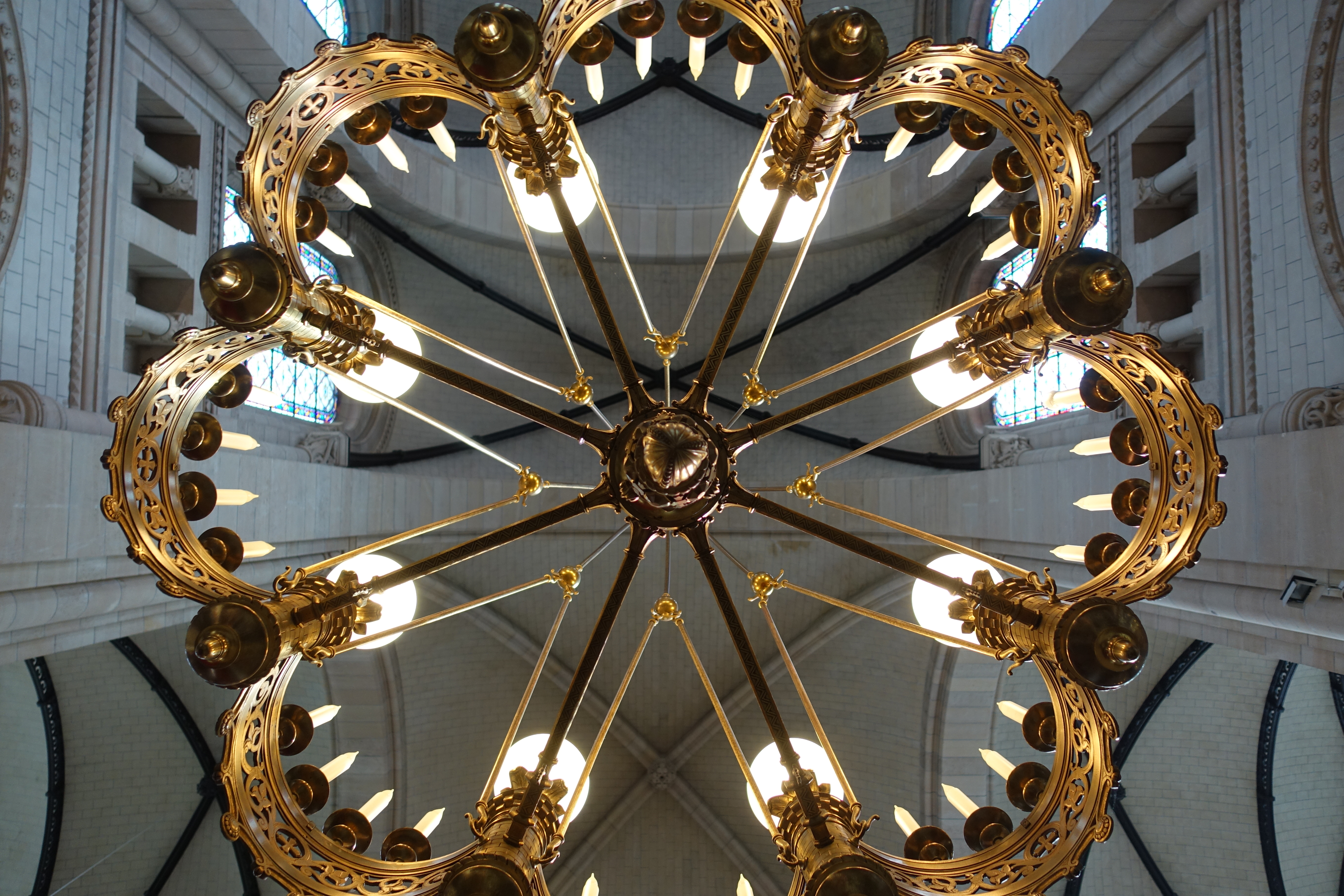
Chandelier in the transept

=== Painting and sculpture ===
The church is filled with paintings and sculpture which illustrate Biblical stories, and are examples of the classical and romantic styles of French religious painting in the mid-19th century.

The statue of the Virgin Mary on the facade and the tympanum sculpture of a Pieta scene over the central portal are the work of Joseph Tournois.

One unusual work which combines painting with sculpture is "Our Lady of the Crucifixion" by Albert Chanot (1881–1963). It is found in the north transept.

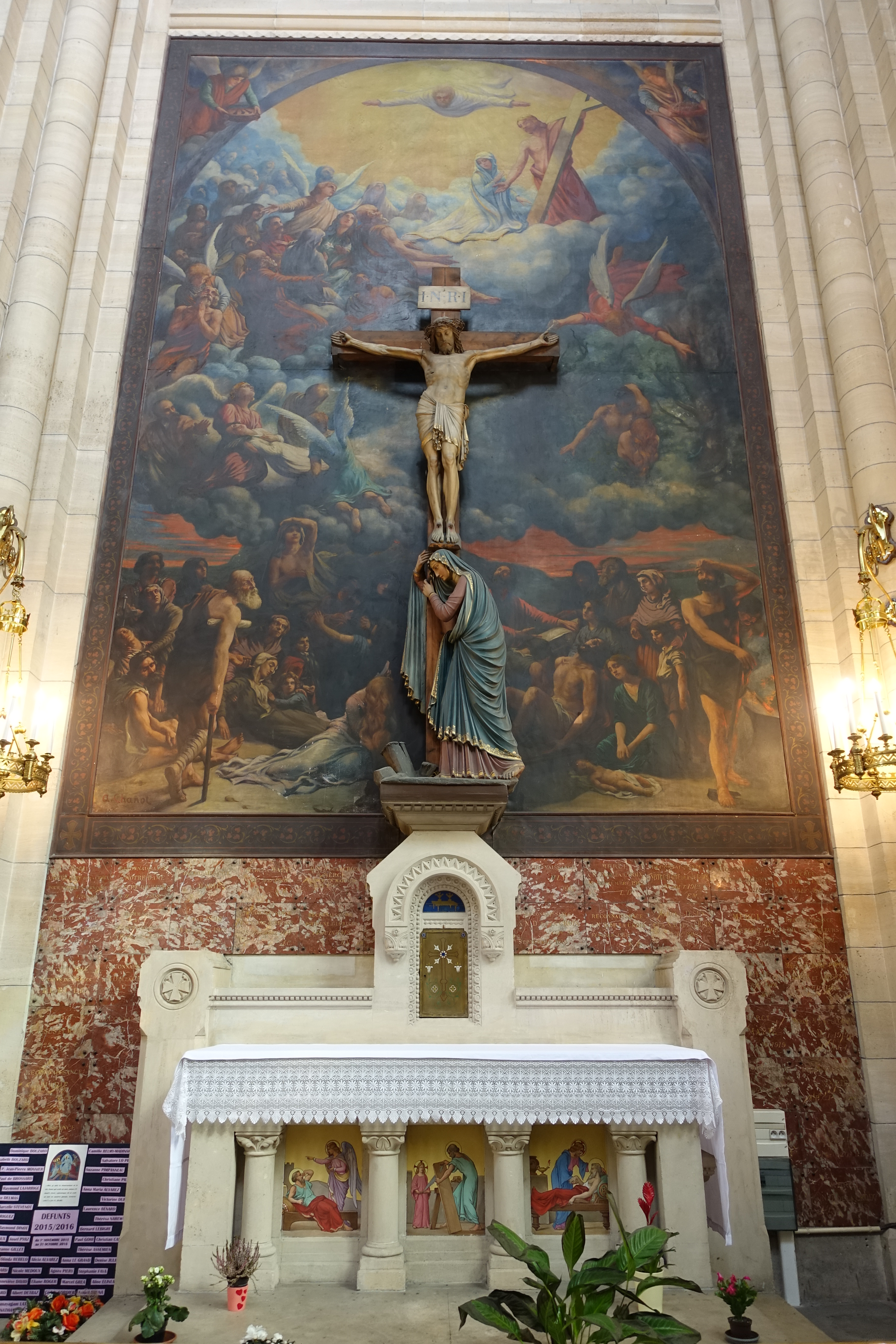
"Our Lady of the Crucifixion" combined sculpture and painting by Albert Chanot (1881–1963)

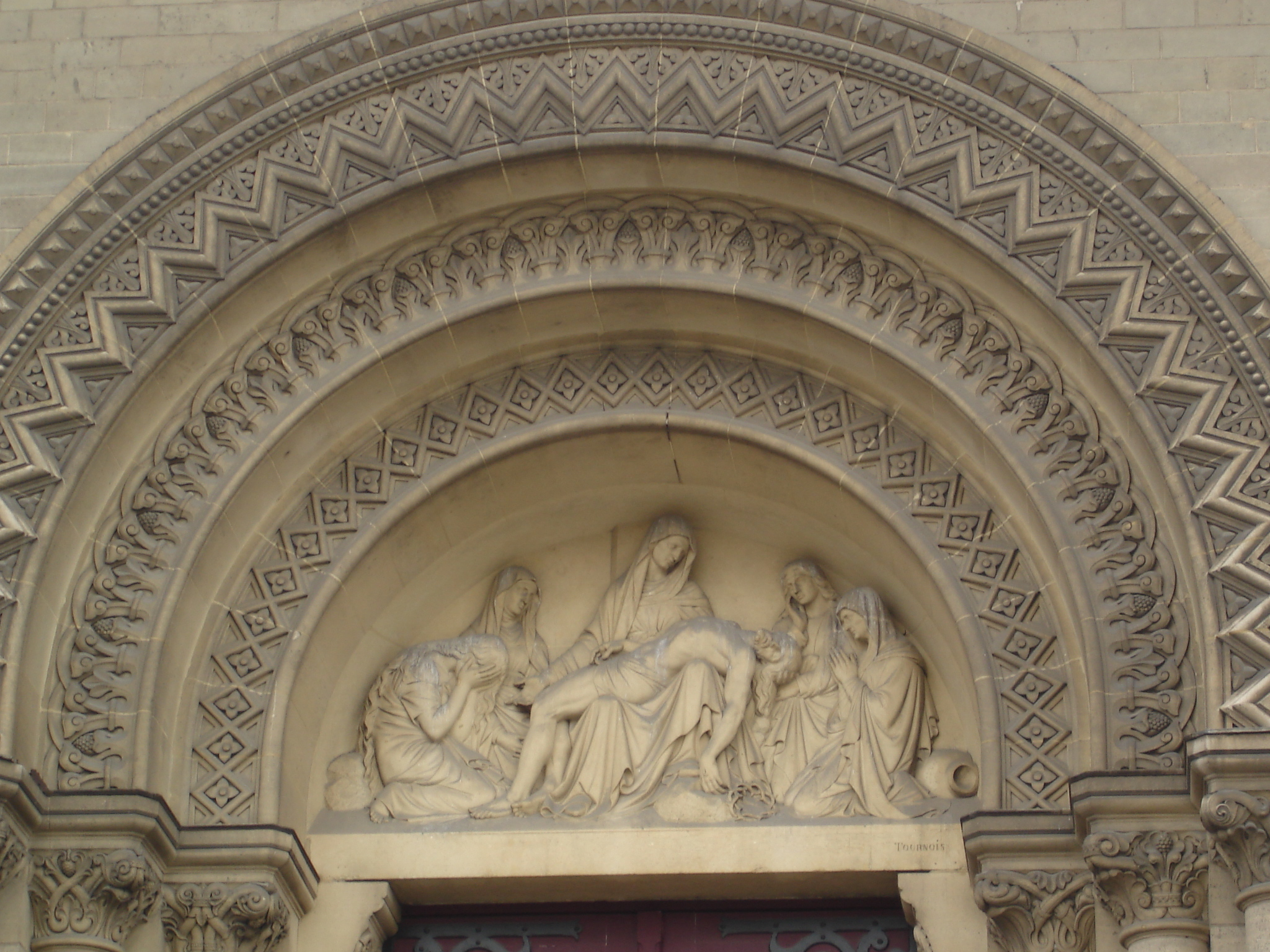
Tymanum of the central portal with sculpture of a Pieta by Joseph Tournois (1830–1891)

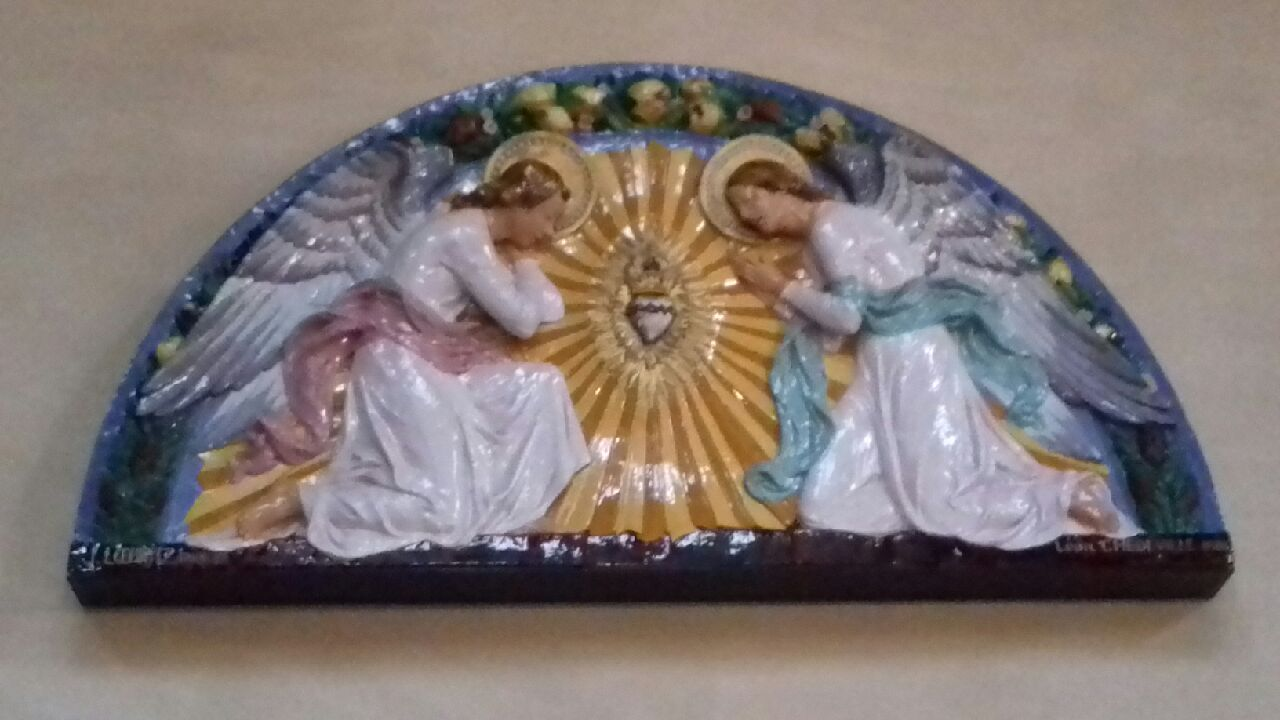
"Two angels adoring the Sacred-Heart", culpture in faience by Leon Chedevill and Jules Loebnitz (1881)

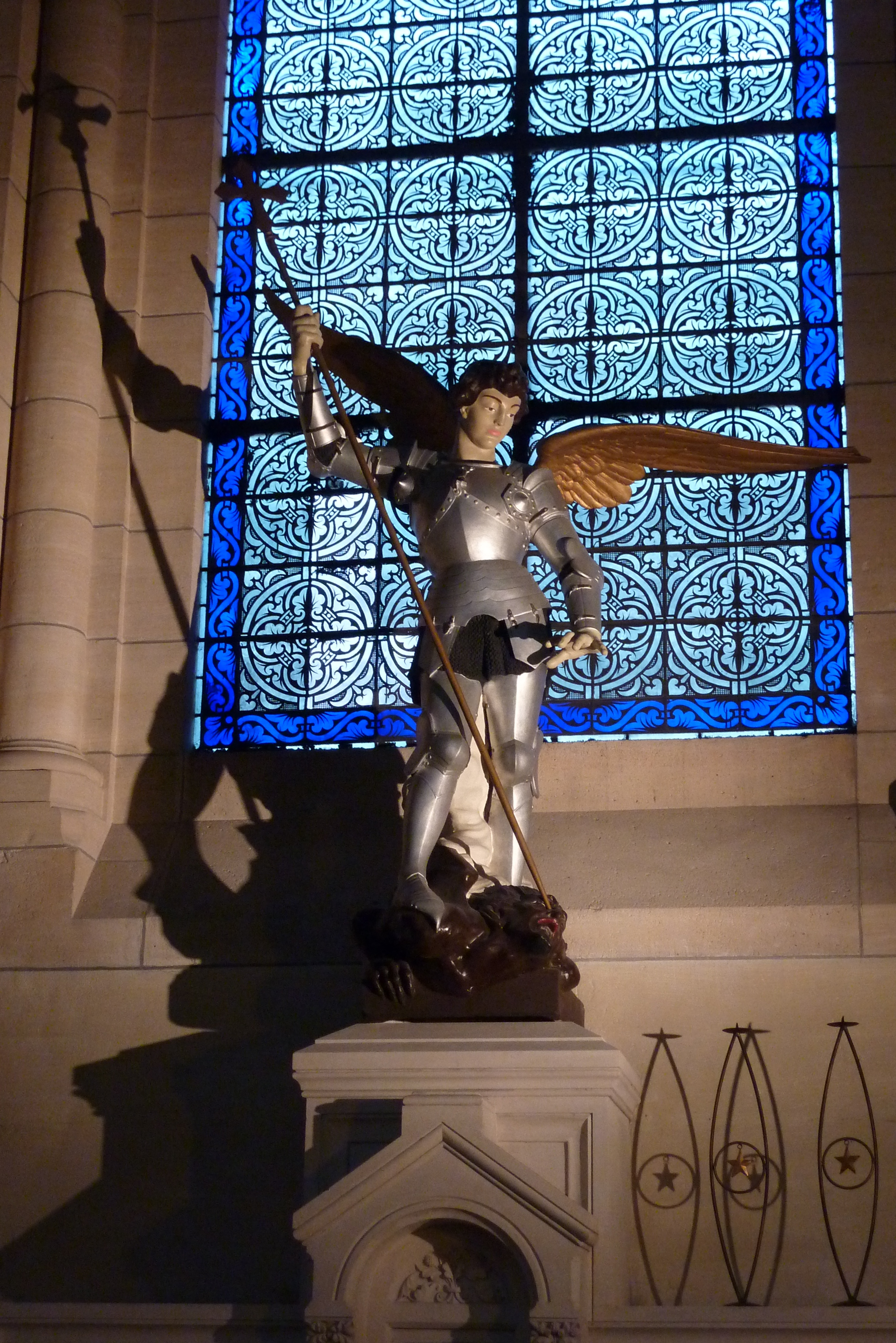
Saint George and the Dragon

=== Stained glass ===
Notre-Dame-de-la-Croix de Ménilmontant is a rare example of a Paris church whose stained glass is entirely decorative, with floral and other abstract designs; there are no history windows or windows depicting Saints or other figures. The windows are designed to bring in a maximum of light and to create a distinct atmosphere.

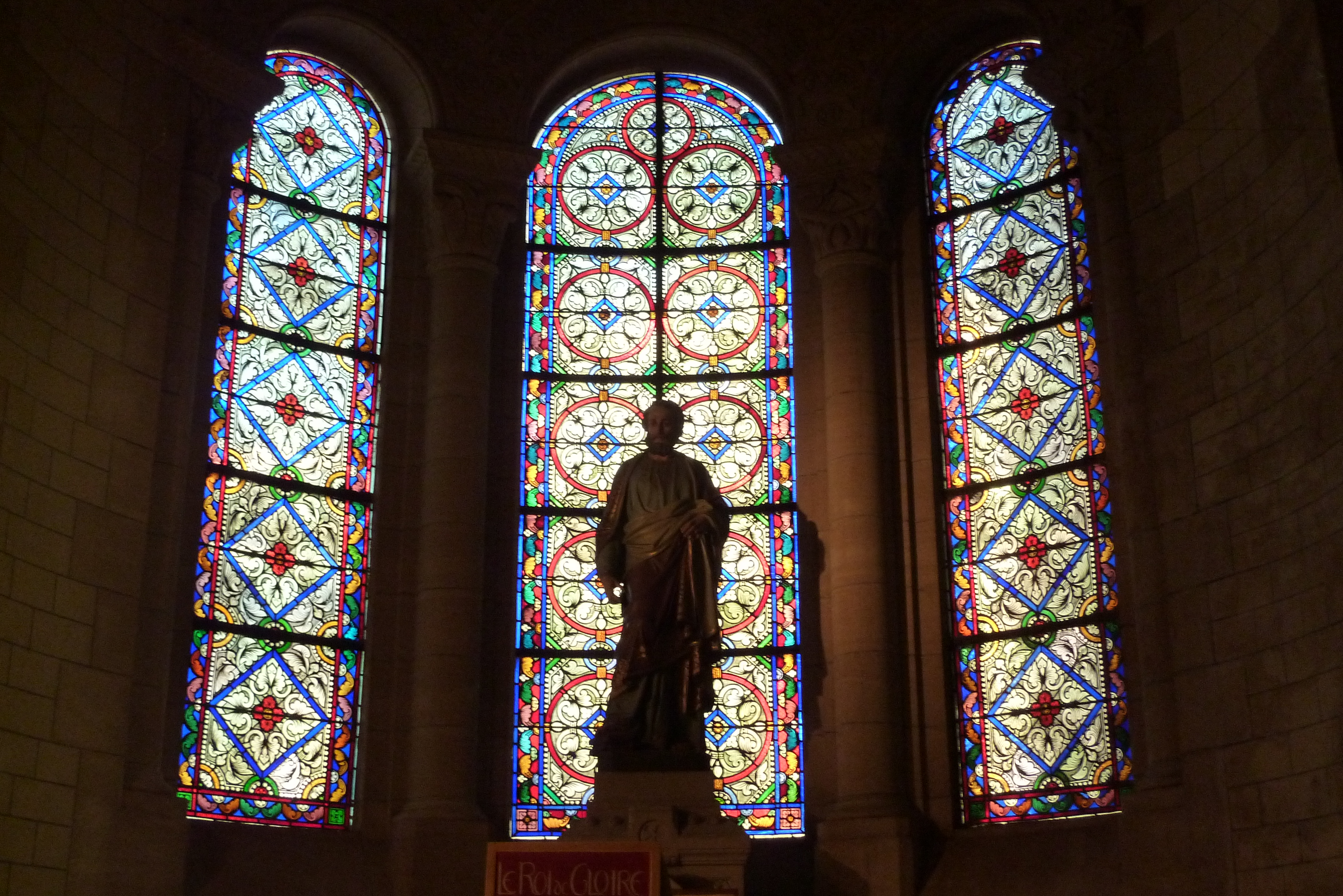
Stained glass in the apse behind the altar

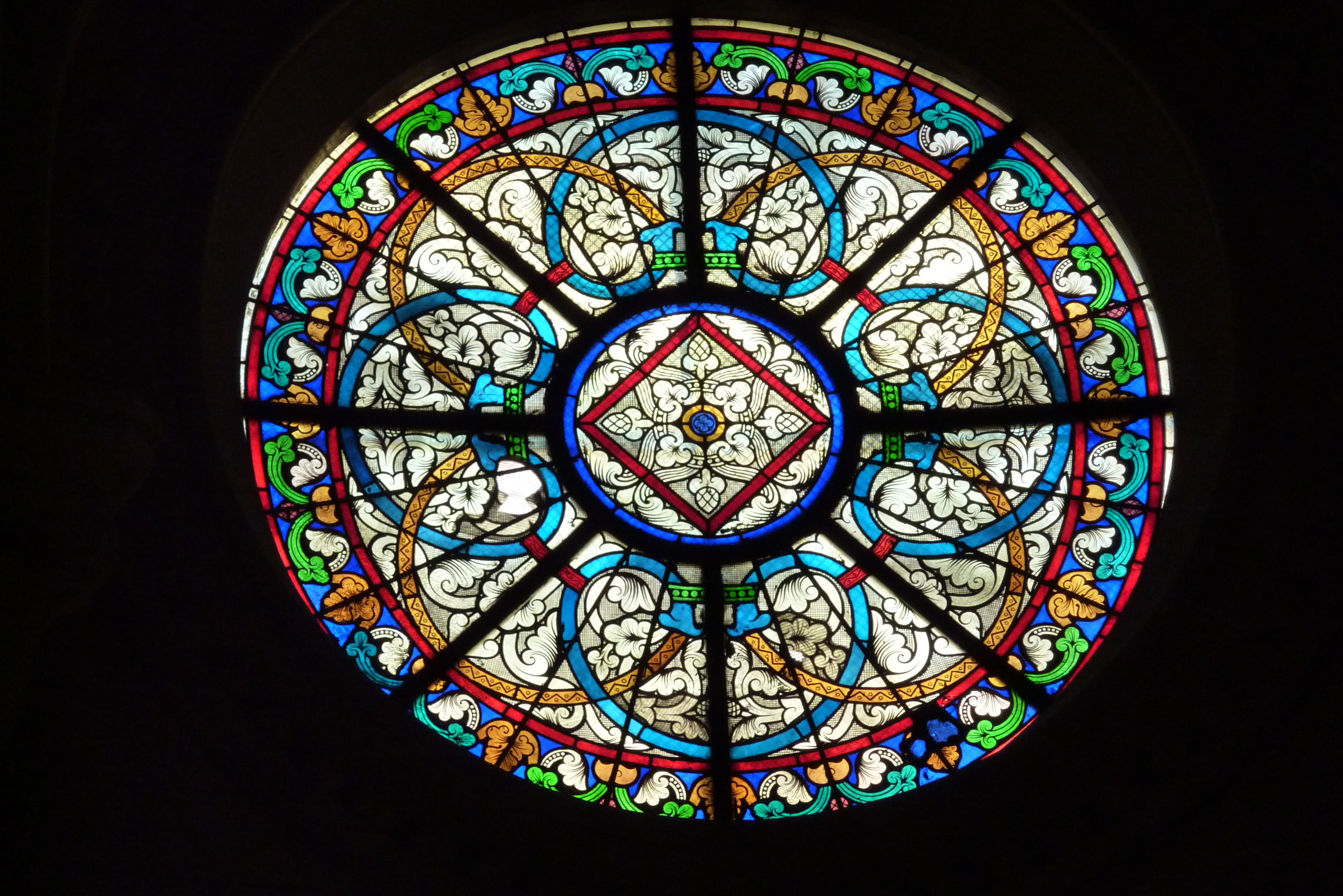
Rose window with floral designs

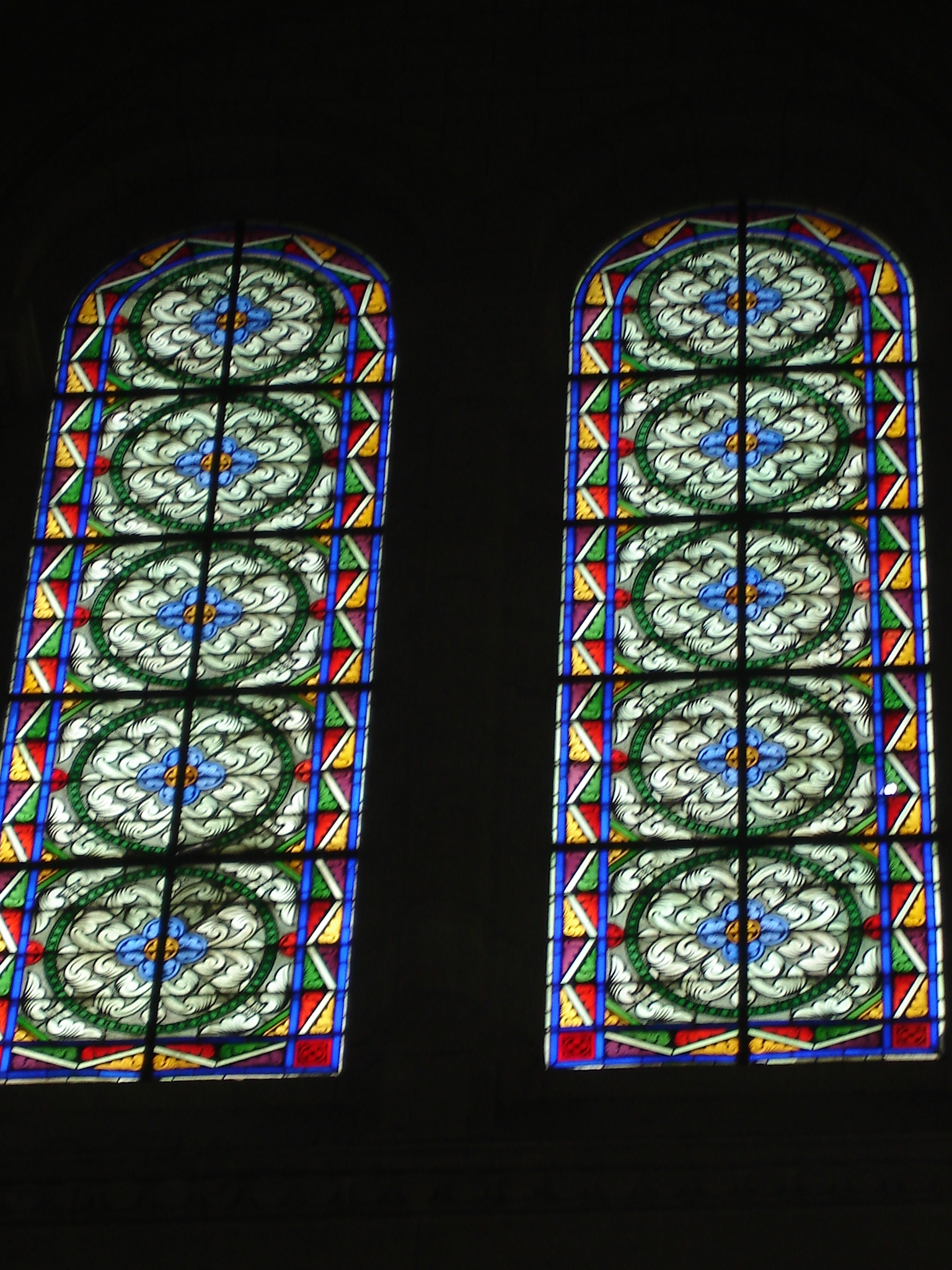
Upper windows in nave

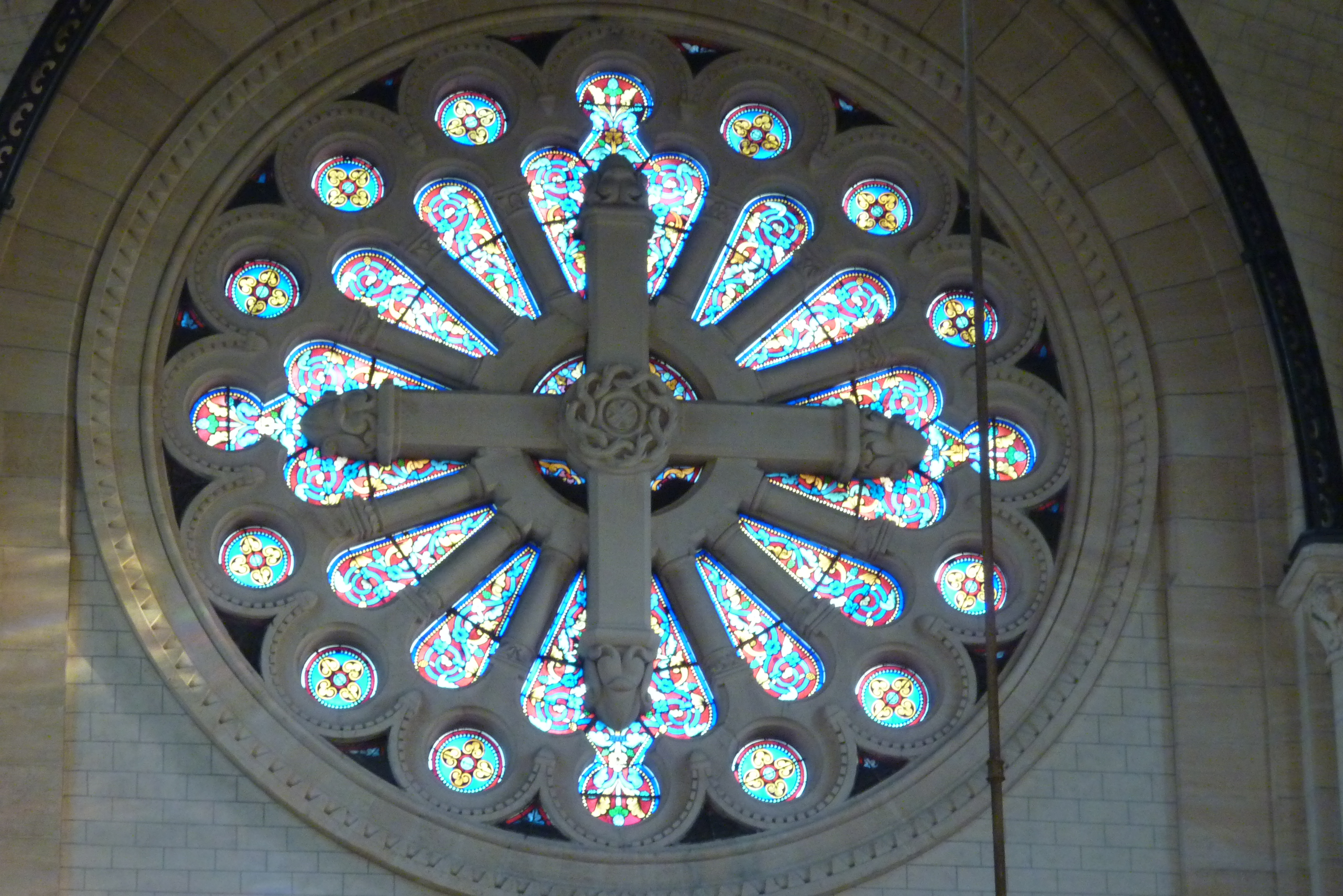
Transept rose window

=== Grand Organ ===
The organ was built by Aristide Cavaillé-Coll from 1872 to 1874. The design of the church presented many difficulties that ultimately meant the organ was not completed as intended. In particular, the rose window required the organ cases to be split between the two sides of the window. The presence of a bell mechanism further hindered construction of the organ. In the end, the intended positive division was never built because it was impossible to route the key mechanism from the console to the pipes. In addition, the console had to be positioned facing the organ rather than facing the church. The third manual on the console was made to play the recit and grand orgue coupled together. When completed, the organ had 26 stops in total. The organist, as of 2023, is Frédéric Denis.

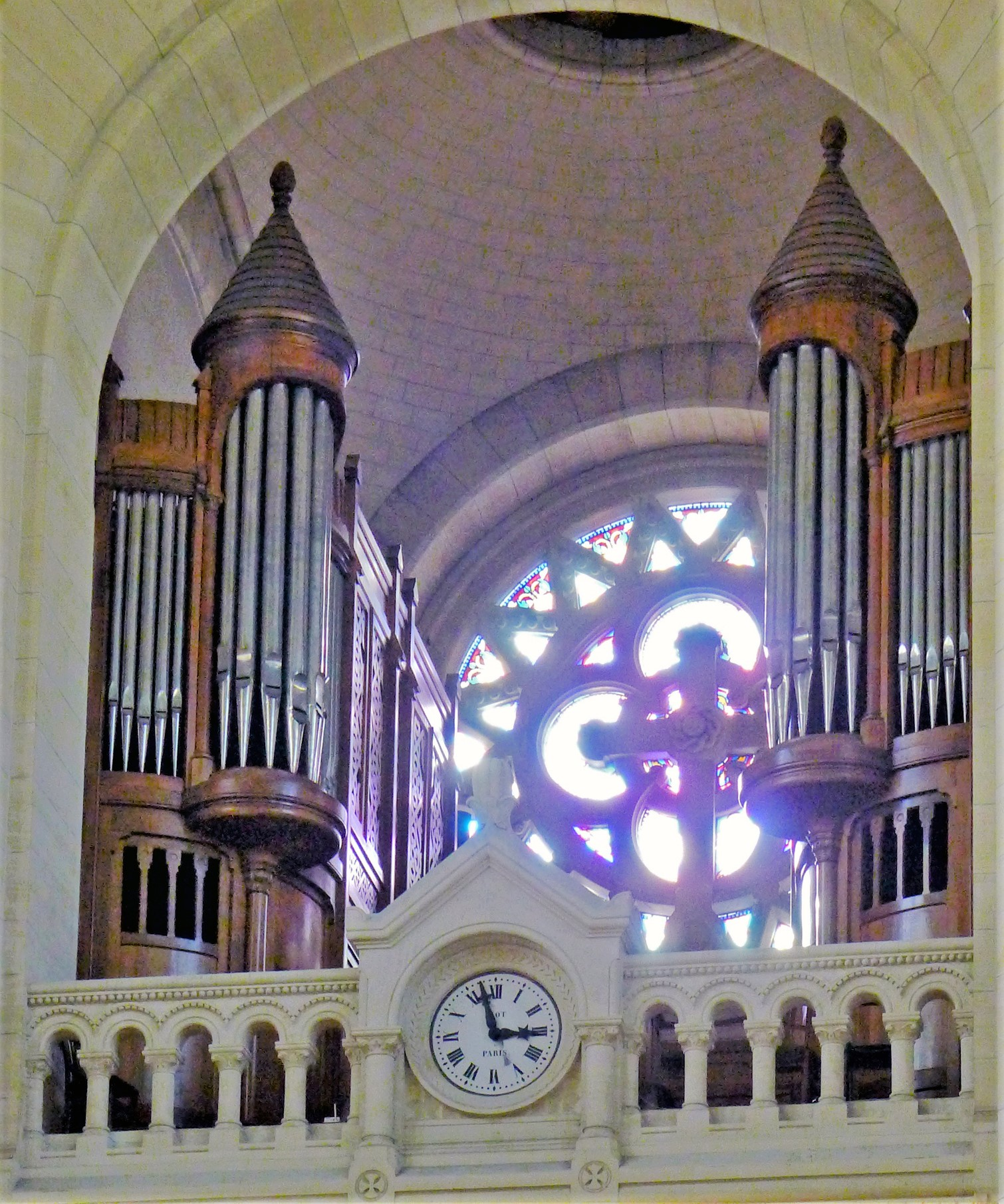
The grand organ in the tribune over the portals

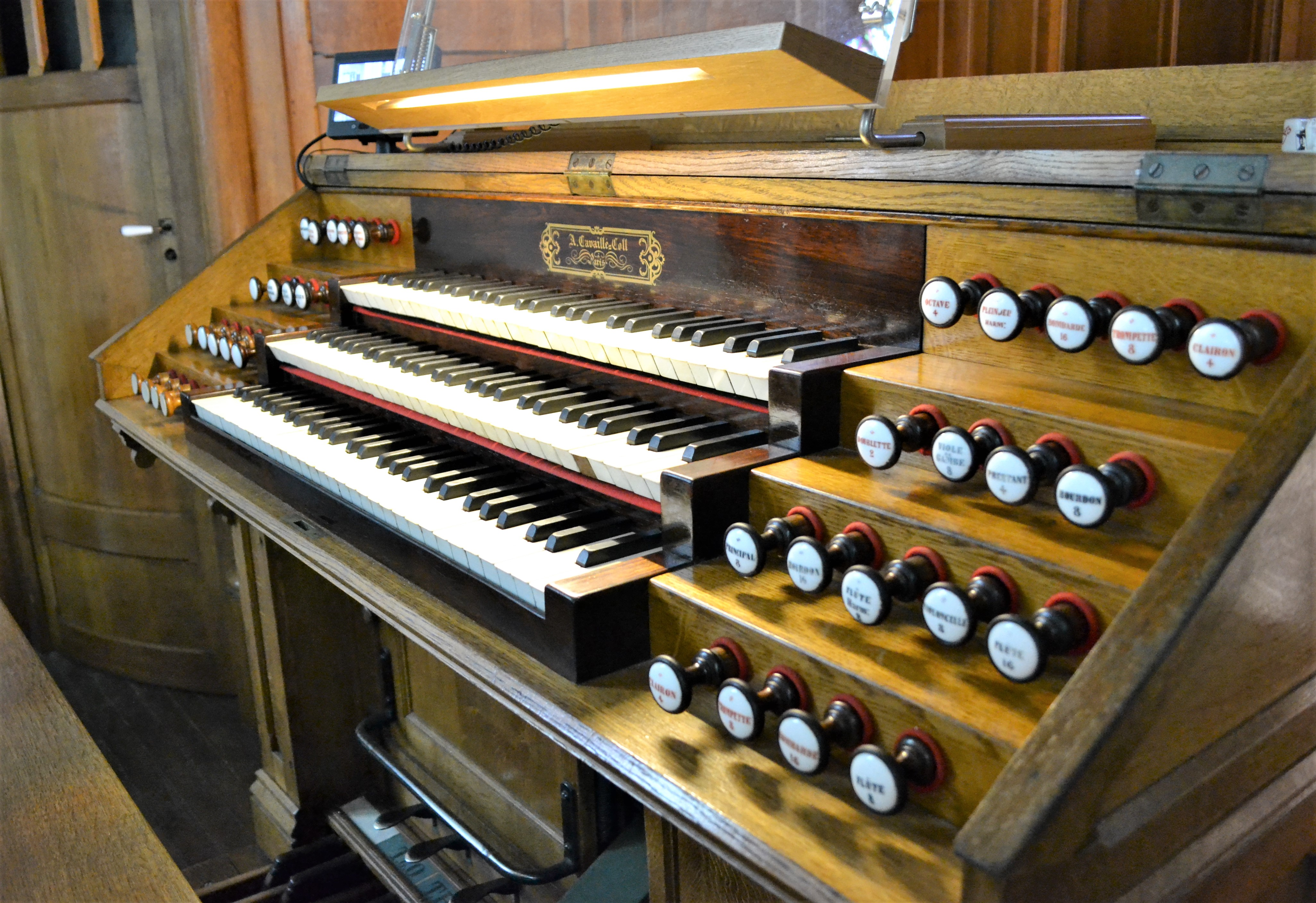
Console of the grand organ
