= Joseph Tournois =

French sculptor

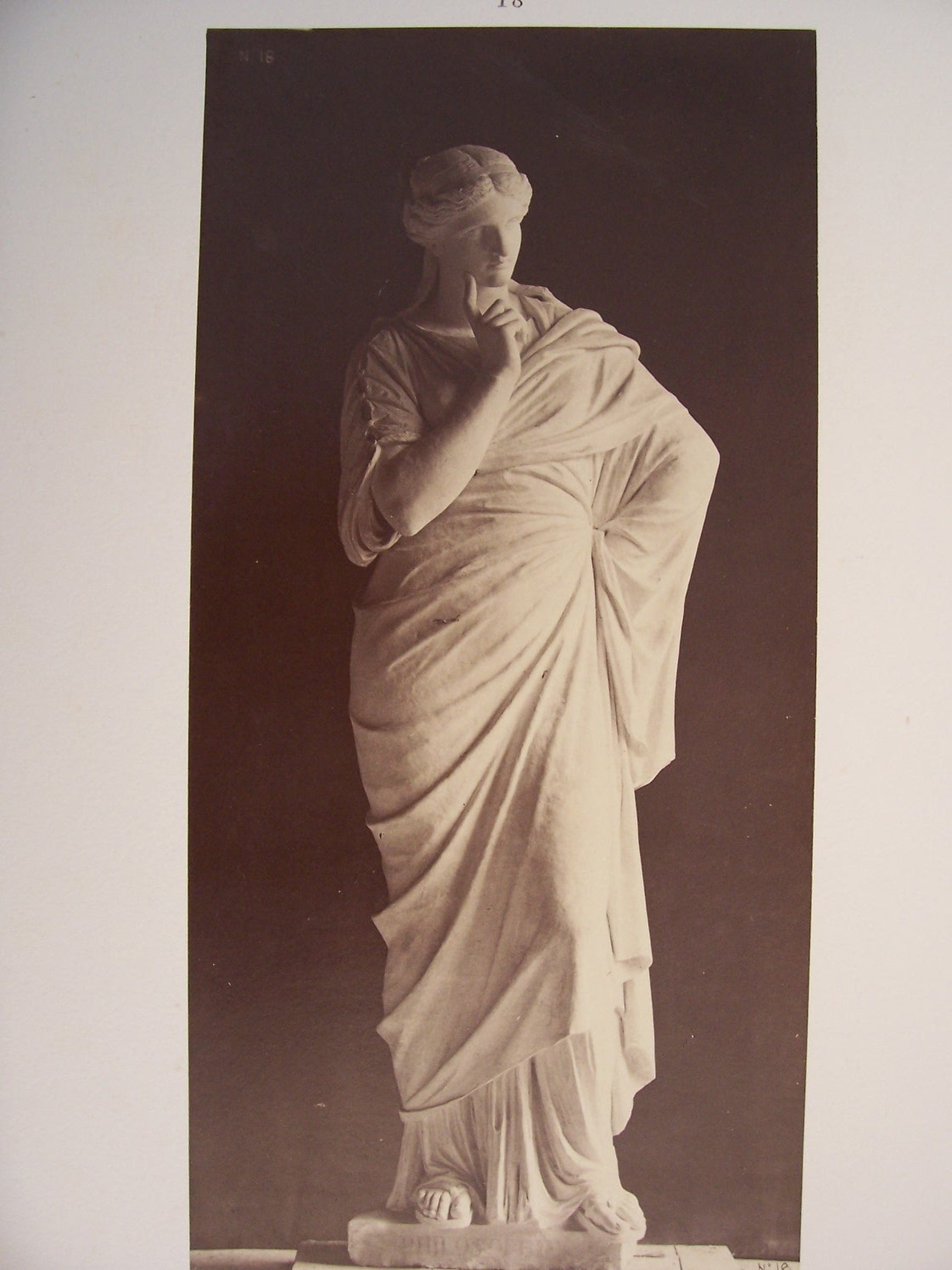
Philosophy, statue by Tournois in the Grand Foyer of the Paris Opera

Joseph Tournois (born in Chazeuil on 18 November 1831, died in Dijon in September 1891) was a French sculptor.

He was the pupil of French sculptors by François Jouffroy and François Rude. He attended the École nationale supérieure des Beaux-Arts, where he created Ulysse blessé à la chasse par un sanglier, a bas-relief with whom he won the first Grand Prix de Rome for sculpture in 1857. Then he moved to Rome and lived in the Académie de France à Rome of Villa Medici, from 27 January 1858 to 31 December 1862.

In 1868, he participated in the Salon des artistes français, with a sculpture in plaster Bacchus inventant la comédie. This work was later acquired by the State and Victor Thiebaut created a copy of the work in bronze. With this sculpture, Tournois participated in 1869 in the Salon de la Culture, then in the Exposition Universelle in Vienna in 1873. The sculpture is currently installed in the Jardin du Luxembourg in Paris.

In 1870, Tournois participated in the Salon des artistes français with a status of Perseus, made in plaster. The work was later owned by the State. In 1875, Tournois made another statue of Perseus, but this time it was in marble.

== Main works ==
- Bust of Armand-Gaston Camus (1740–1804), Palace of Versailles, Versailles
- Perseus, 1875, Musée de Dijon
- Ulysse blessé à la chasse par un sanglier, bas-relief, Musée de l'École nationale supérieure des Beaux-Arts
- Bacchus inventant la comédie, sculpture, jardin du Luxembourg
- Hercules, 1891, colossal statue in gilded bronze, park of Vaux-le-Vicomte
