= List of foreign recipients of the Légion d'Honneur by country =

The following is a list of notable foreign members of the Legion of Honor by their country of origin. The Legion of Honor is the highest decoration in France. and is divided into five degrees (lower to higher): Chevalier (Knight), Officier (Officer), Commandeur (Commander), Grand Officier (Grand Officer) and Grand Croix (Grand Cross).

Membership in the Legion of Honor is restricted to French nationals. Foreign nationals who have served France or the ideals it upholds may, however, receive a distinction of the Légion, which is nearly the same thing as membership in the Légion. Foreign nationals who live in France are submitted to the same requirements as Frenchmen. Foreign nationals who live abroad may be awarded a distinction of any rank or dignity in the Légion.

A complete, chronological list of the members of the Legion of Honor nominated from the very first ceremony in 1804 to now does not exist. The number is estimated at one million. Among them about 3,000 were decorated with the Grand Cross (including 1,200 French).

== Albania ==
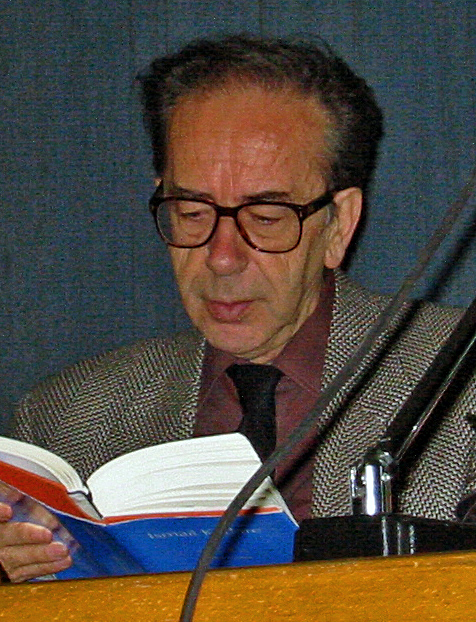
Ismail Kadare

Grand Officer

- Ismail Kadare (2020), a writer
- Iliaz Vrioni, politician

Commander

- Edi Rama (2017), Albanian prime minister

Chevalier

- Fatos Kongoli (2010), a writer

== Algeria ==
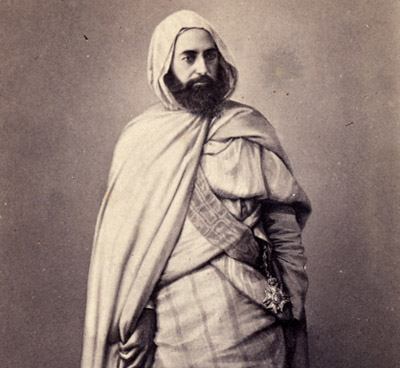
Abdelkader El Djezairi wearing the sash of the Légion d'honneur in 1860

Algeria was part of France from 1830 to 1962

Grand Cross

- Abdelkader El Djezairi (Grand Croix, 1860), religious and military leader. Awarded Legion of Honour for protecting Christians in Damascus during the Syrian crisis of 1860
- Si Kaddour Benghabrit (1939), official and founder of the Muslim Institute of the Great Mosque of Paris
- Djelloul Ben Lakhdar (1856-1940), bachaga of the Larbaa

Chevalier

- Saïd Cid Kaoui (1904), berberologist, lexicographer and interpreter officer of the 1st class.

== Argentina ==
Chevalier

- Adolfo Bioy Casares (1981), writer.
- Ernesto Sabato (Chevalier, 1979; Commandeur, 1987), writer, humanist, physicist, president of the CONADEP
- Juan David Nasio (1999), psychoanalyst, psychiatric physician, writer.

Officier

- Victoria Ocampo (Officier, 1962; Chevalier), writer, critic; founder, publisher and director of Sur, philanthropist.
- Quino (2014), cartoonist, creator of Mafalda

Commander

- Jorge Luis Borges (1983), writer, teacher.

Grand Cross

- Mauricio Macri (2016), president of Argentina

== Armenia ==
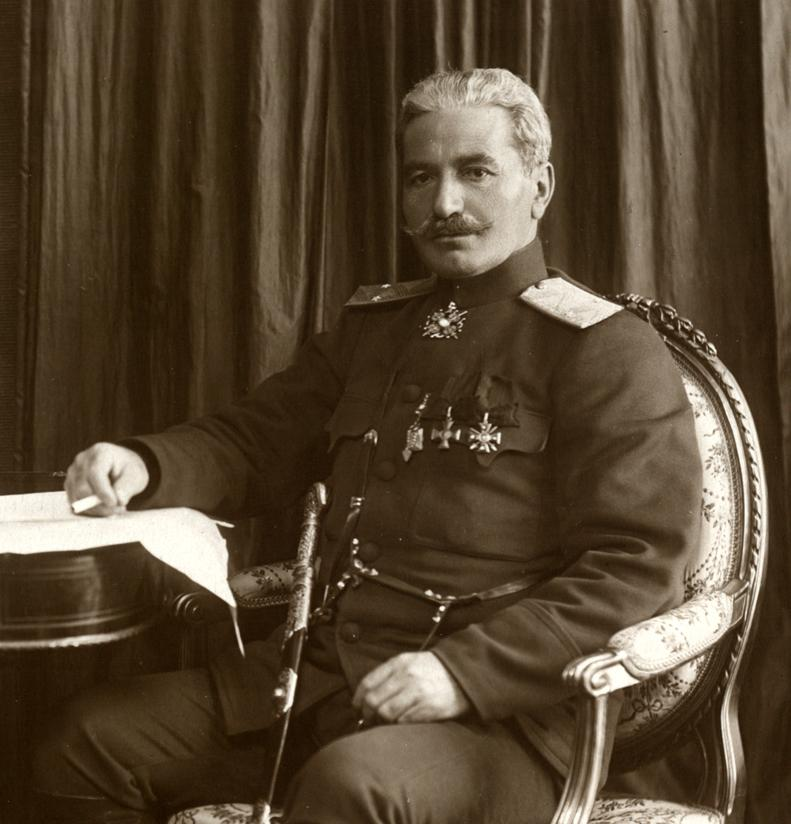
General Andranik Ozanian, Armenian military commander and statesman

Grand Cross

- Robert Kocharyan, (Grand Cross), politician, former president of Armenia
- Serzh Sargsyan (Grand Cross, 2011), politician, former president of Armenia
- Nikol Pashinyan ( Grand Cross, 2026) politician, Prime Minister of Armenia

Grand Officier

- Eduard Nalbandyan (Grand Officier, 2011), diplomat, former Minister of Foreign Affairs

Commander

- Sergei Khudyakov, Marshal of the aviation of Soviet Union

Officier

- Andranik Ozanian, military commander and statesman (1919)
- Aram Karamanoukian, was a Lieutenant General of the Syrian Army
- Ara Güler, was an Armenian photojournalist from Turkey (2000)

Chevalier

- Ara Abramyan, prominent philanthropist, social activist, and businessmen from Russia (2005)
- Ivan Ayvazovsky, Romantic painter who is considered one of the greatest masters of marine art (1857)

Religious Leader

- Karekin II, Catholicos of All Armenians, the supreme head of the Armenian Apostolic Church

== Australia ==
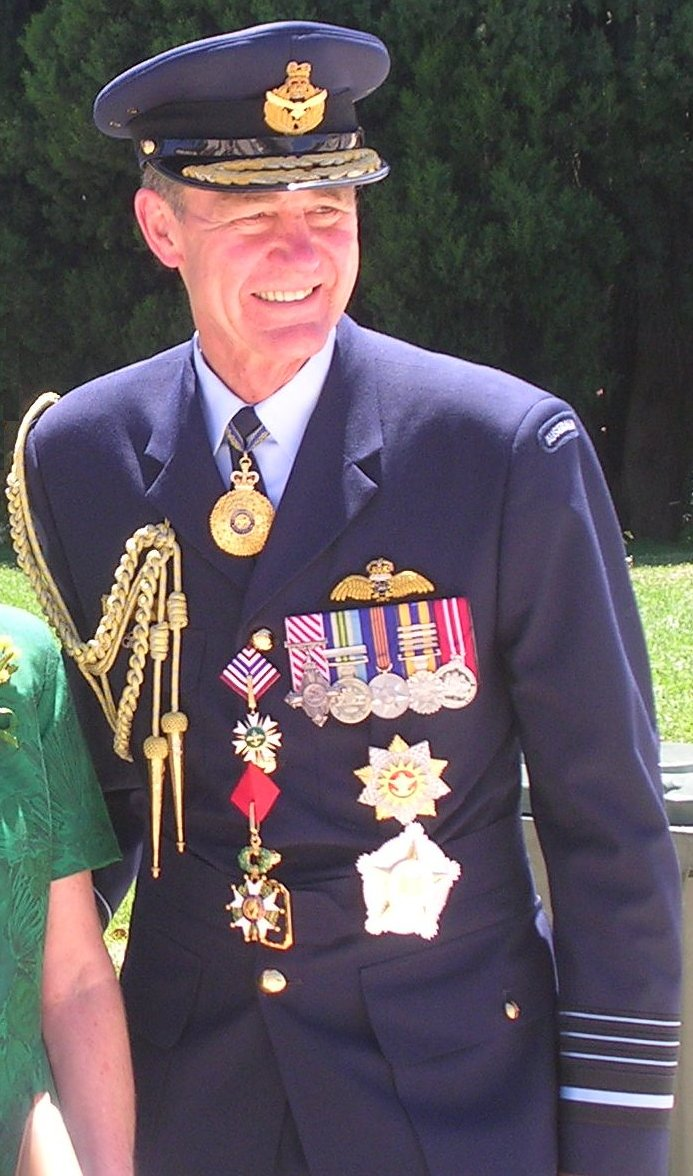
Air Chief Marshal Sir Angus Houston wearing his Légion d'honneur and other insignia in 2009.

Grand Officer

- General Sir John Monash, GCMG, KCB, VD (1919), appointed Grand Officier during World War I

Commander

- Air Chief Marshal Mark Binskin, AC (2017), Chief of the Defence Force, appointed Chevalier in 2015
- Stephen Brady AO CVO (2017), ambassador of Australia to France
- Air Chief Marshal Sir Angus Houston, AK, AFC (2007), former Chief of the Defence Force
- Howard Florey OM FRS FRCP (Commandeur, 1946) pathologist and pharmacologist, known for his role in discovery of Penicillin.
- Sir Ninian Stephen KG, AK, GCMG, GCVO, KBE (1983), Governor-General of Australia

Officer

- Major General Sir John Gellibrand, KCB, DSO & Two Bars (1919), Commander 3rd Australian Division, appointed Officier during World War I
- Major General Sir Thomas Glasgow, KCB, CMG, DSO (1919), Commander 1st Australian Division, appointed Officier during World War I
- Major General Sir Charles Rosenthal, KCB, CMG, DSO, VD (1919), Commander 2nd Australian Division, appointed Officier during World War I
- Ross Steele, AM (2008), for promoting the teaching of French language and culture. Was also appointed Chevalier in 1996
- General Sir Peter Cosgrove, AK, MC, Governor General of Australia
- General David Hurley, AC, DSC (2012), Governor of New South Wales
- Vice Admiral Ray Griggs, AO, CSC (25 March 2014), Chief of Navy
- Dame Marie Bashir, AD, CVO (2014), Governor of New South Wales. Was also appointed Chevalier in 2009
- Lieutenant General David Morrison, AO (July 2014), Chief of Army.
- Vice Admiral Tim Barrett, AO, CSC, RAN (8 April 2017), Chief of Navy.
- Vice Admiral David Johnston, AO, RAN (16 November 2018), Vice Chief of the Defence Force.
- Nancy Wake, partisan of the French Resistance in World War 2

Chevalier

- Lieutenant Colonel Sir Michael Bruxner, KBE, DSO, JP (1917), later to become a prominent NSW politician, was appointed as a Chevalier "in recognition of distinguished services" during the Sinai and Palestine Campaign in the First World War
- Lieutenant General Sir Leslie Morshead, KCB, KBE, CMG, DSO, ED (1919), 33rd Battalion, AIF, appointed Officier during World War I
- James Taylor (1927), Australian Olympic Federation president
- Professor Francis Patrick Donovan AM (1998), appointed Chevalier in recognition of services to the International Court of Arbitration and the relationship between France and Australia.
- Charlie Mance (Age 98) travelled to France in 1998 to receive the medal for serving in France as an ally in World War One.
- Robert Cowper (2004), flying ace of the Second World War
- Tom Hughes, AO, QC (2005), prominent barrister and Attorney-General in the Gorton Government, appointed Chevalier for his contribution as an RAAF pilot in the D-Day landings
- Suzanne Cory, AC (2009), professor of medical research with the Institut Pasteur
- Duncan Kerr, Judge of the Federal Court of Australia (2011)
- Professor Kurt Lambeck AO, FRS, FAA, FRSN, (2013), geoscientist who helped establish the Centre national d'études spatiales (National Centre for Space Studies)
- John Spender KC (2013)
- Edmund Charles Spencer World War I veteran awarded the Légion d'Honneur on the 80th anniversary of the armistice.
- Rear Admiral Michael Noonan, AM, RAN (October 2017), Deputy Chief of Navy
- Gordon Victor Fells Powell (born 1925), Royal Navy, was appointed Chevalier in the Ordre National de la Légion D'honneur in May 2017 in recognition of his service in WWII as a Gunner during the liberation of France at the Normandy D-Day Landings, and the building of the Mulberry Docks.
- Leslie Eric Emmerson, British Army, 43rd Regiment, Bren Gunner, was appointed Chevalier in the Ordre National de la Légion D'honneur in May 2017 in recognition of his outstanding WWII service during the liberation of France both during the Normandy D-Day Landings, and throughout France.

Flight Lieutenant Herbert George‘Bert’ Adams, RAAF Service No. 424504, Bomber Command WWII: 1939-45 star, with a Bomber Command clasp, DFC, National Order of the Legion of Honour.

== Austria ==
Grand Cross

- Ferdinand III (Grand Croix), Grand Duke of Tuscany

Grand Officer

- Friedrich von Beck-Rzikowsky, field marshal, chief of the general staff of the Imperial and Royal Army of Austria-Hungary

Chevalier

- Peter Engelmann, philosopher and publisher (2013)
- Hans Hollein (2003), architect and designer

== Azerbaijan ==
- Mehriban Aliyeva, the first lady of Azerbaijan
- Novruz Mammadov, Prime Minister of Azerbaijan (2019) for his contribution to the cooperation between Azerbaijan and France.

== Bahrain ==
- Mohammed bin Jasim Alghatam, politician, scientist and army veteran received both Chevalier and Commandeur of the Légion d'Honneur

== Bangladesh ==
- Arshad-uz Zaman (first Bangladeshi)
- Loqman Husain (Chevalier, 1980)
- Sayeed Ahmed (1993)
- Muhammad Yunus (Officer, 2004)
- Rasul Nizam (Chevalier, 2004)

== Belgium ==
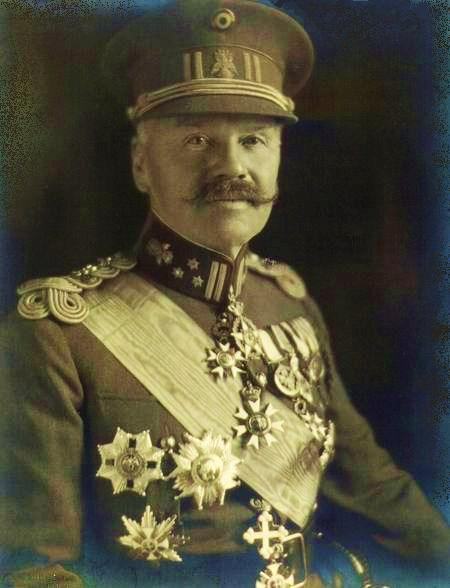
Lieutenant-General Baron Alphonse Jacques de Dixmude

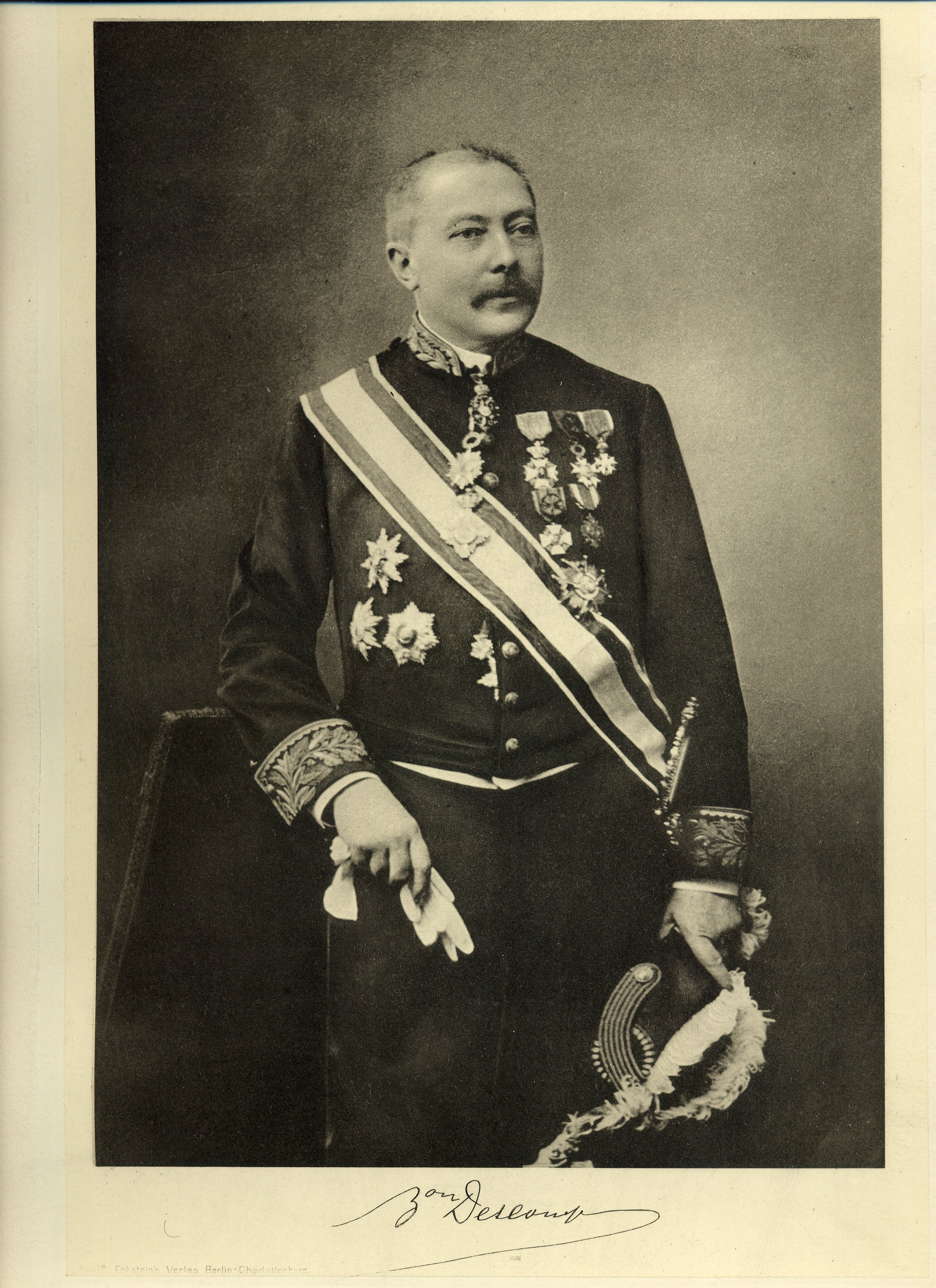
Baron Descamps is wearing the medal on his chest.

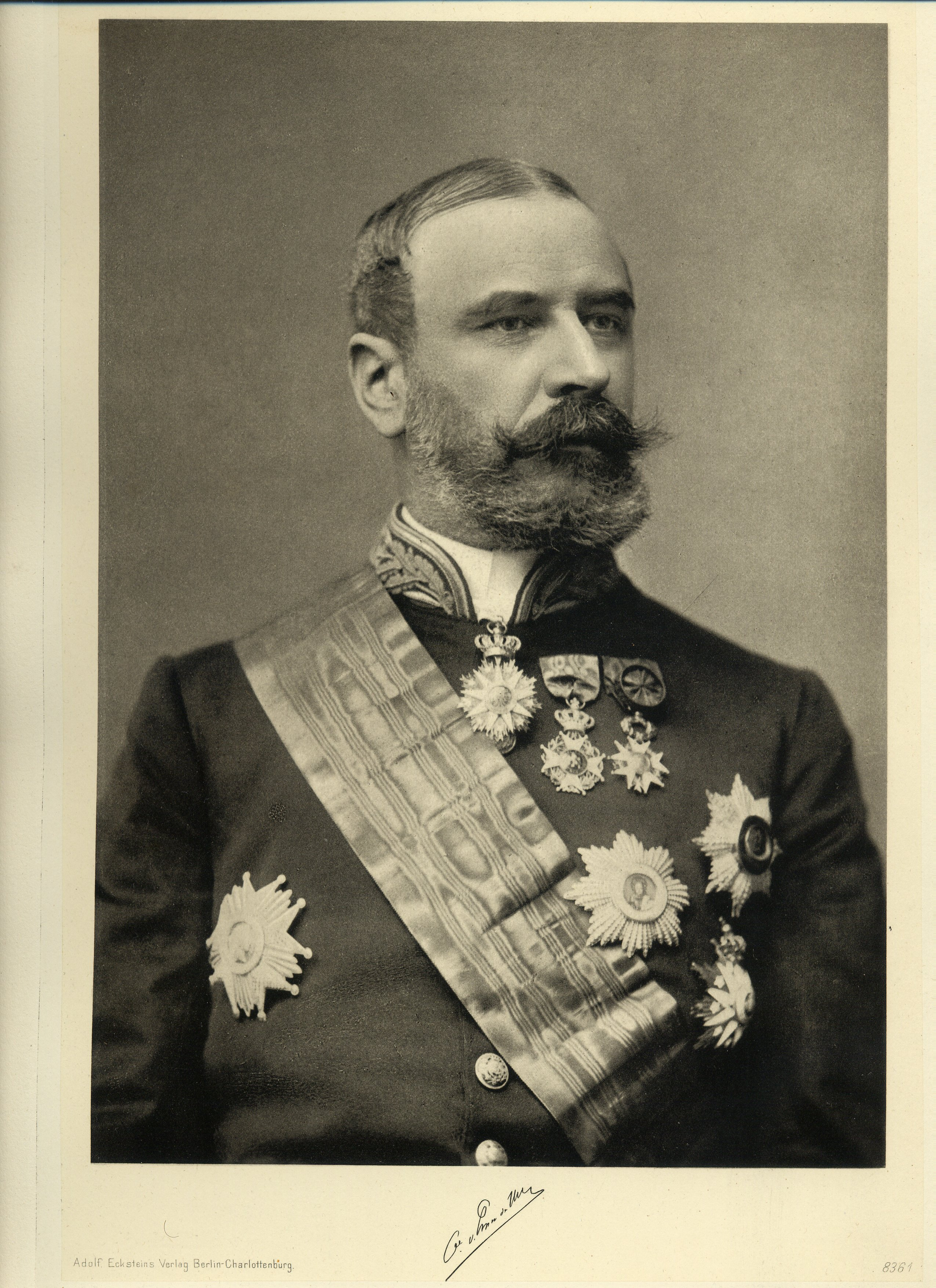
Count de Smet de Naeyer, knight Grand Cross

- Achille Van Acker (Grand Croix), former prime minister
- Albert II, King of the Belgians
- Alfred Belpaire (Grand Officier), locomotive engineer
- Baron Jean-Pierre Berghmans in 2005 (Chevalier), economist and industrialist
- Count Paul Buysse (2011), businessman
- Marie Joseph Charles, 6th Duke d'Ursel, politician
- Alfred Cluysenaar (1878), painter
- Willy Coppens (Commandeur, 1934), flying ace, balloon buster and writer
- Baron Henry Delvaux de Fenffe (Grand Officier), civil servant
- Baron Édouard Descamps (Grand Officier), jurist and politician
- Édouard Empain (Officier, 1900), engineer, financier and industrialist
- Zénobe Gramme (Chevalier) electrical engineer, inventor of Gramme machine
- Roger Lallemand (Commandeur, 1991), former president of the Senate
- Baron Auguste Lambermont (Grand Officier), statesman
- Henri Lavachery (Chevalier, 1935), archaeologist and ethnologist. Awarded Legion of Honour for his work during the expedition to Easter Island.
- Edmund Leburton, former prime minister
- Gérard Leman (Grand Croix), general. Awarded Legion of Honour for his role in defending Liège during World War I.
- Benoît Lengelé (Chevalier, 2019), physician, surgeon and anatomist. Awarded Legion of Honour for performing the first partial face transplant.
- Leopold II (1854), King of the Belgians and founder of Congo Free State
- Charles Liedts (Grand Officier), former president of the Chamber of Representatives
- Anne-Marie Lizin (2005), former president of the Senate
- Jules Malou (Grand Croix) former prime minister
- Wilfried Martens, former prime minister
- Désiré-Joseph Mercier (Grand Croix, 1924) former Archbishop of Mechelen and Primate of Belgium
- Eddy Merckx (Commandeur, 2011), cyclist
- Louis Michel, politician
- Baron Charles-Ferdinand Nothomb (1984), former president of the Chamber of Representatives
- Walter Peeters (Engineer/Economist 2018) Presidential Decree of 31 December 2018, Nr. PRER1827894D, Journal Officiel Republique Française, 12 July 2019
- Louis Raemaekers (Officier) painter, caricaturist and editorial cartoonist for De Telegraaf
- Didier Reynders (Commandeur, 2013), former European Commissioner for Justice
- Marc Roche (2016), journalist
- Count Jacques Rogge (Officier, 2011), former president of the International Olympic Committee
- François van Rysselberghe (Chevalier, 1881), scientist
- Count Paul de Smet de Naeyer, former head of Société Générale de Belgique and former prime minister of Belgium.
- Freddy Thielemans (Officier, 2014), former mayor of the City of Brussels
- 2016:
- Baron Alphonse Jacques de Dixmude, Grand Officer.
- Paul Breyne, Chevalier.
- Baron Auguste Goffinet, Officer.
- Baron Emile-Ernest de Cartier de Marchienne, Officer.
- Baron Paul Janssen, founder of Janssen Pharmaceutica, Officer.
- Knight François-Xavier de Donnea, former mayor of the City of Brussels and Minister-President of the Brussels Region, Officer.
- Knight Antonin de Selliers de Moranville, Chevalier
- the 8th Duke d'Ursel, knight

== Benin ==
- Vicentia Boco, Knight
- Émile Derlin Zinsou (Grand Croix, 1996), former president of Dahomey.

== Bosnia and Herzegovina ==
- Ivan Ceresnjes (1994), head of the Jewish community of Bosnia and Herzegovina, for non-sectarian humanitarian relief work during the Bosnian War.
- Jovan Divjak (2001), Bosnian general and philanthropist
- Vahid Halilhodžić (2004), professional football manager and former football player
- Emerik Blum (1974), was a Bosnian Jewish businessman, philanthropist and politician who served as the 26th mayor of Sarajevo from 1981 to 1983. He founded the Energoinvest company in Sarajevo.

== Brazil ==
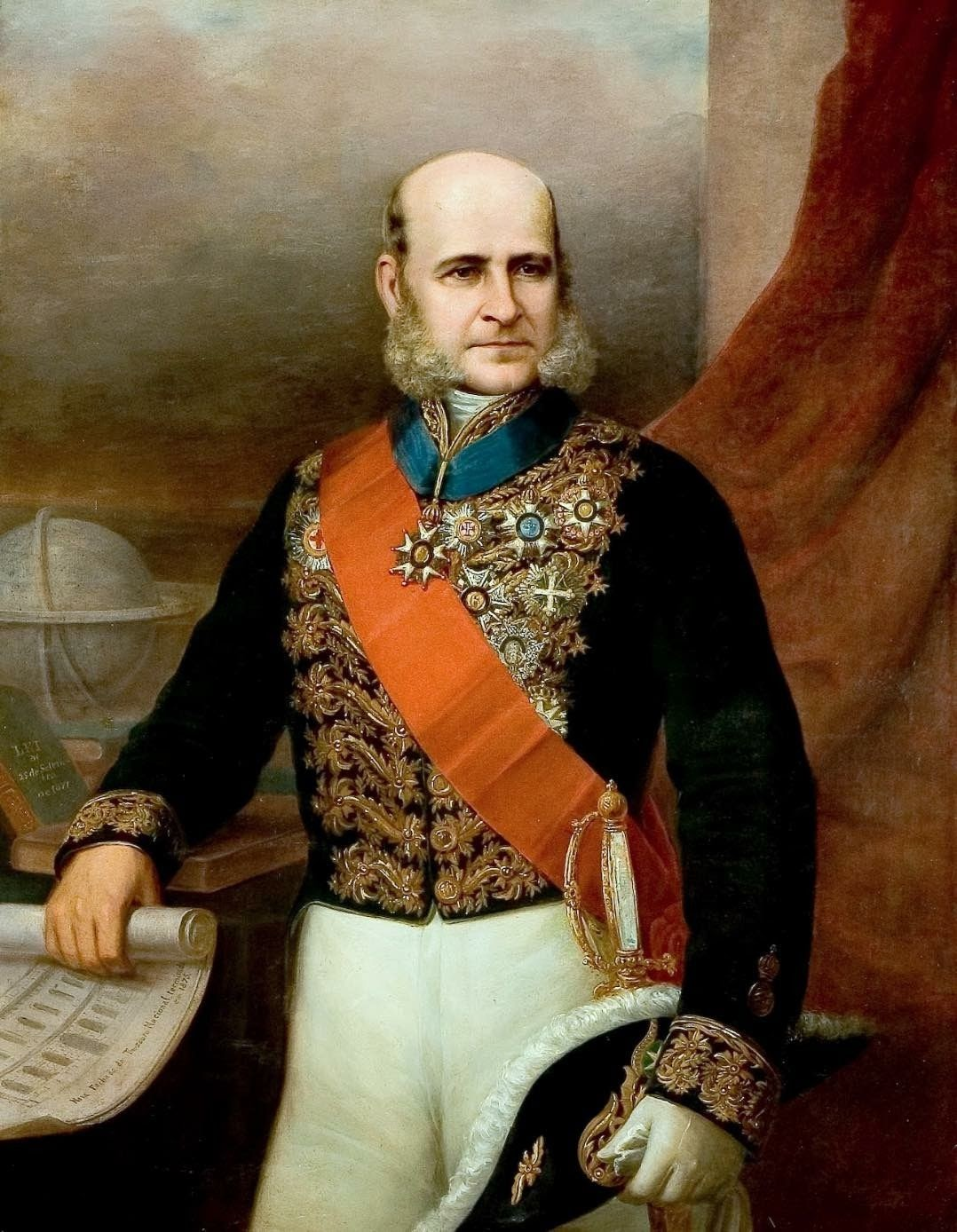
José Paranhos, Viscount of Rio Branco. Wearing the sash of the Légion d'honneur and other orders in 1875.

- Jorge Amado (Commandeur, 1984) writer
- Gilberto Freyre KBE (Commandeur, 1986) sociologist and anthropologist
- João Havelange (Grand Officier, 1998) former president of FIFA
- José Paranhos, Viscount of Rio Branco, was decorated with the Grand Cross
- Pedro de Araújo Lima, Marquis of Olinda, was decorated with the Grand Cross
- Emperor Dom Pedro II was decorated with the Grand Cross
- Epitácio Lindolfo da Silva Pessoa, president, he was decorated with the Grand Cross
- Senator Rodrigo Augusto da Silva, foreign minister in 1889, decorated with the Grand Cross
- Alberto Santos-Dumont (Chevalier, 1904; Commandeur, 1913; Grand Officier, 1929) aeronaut, sportsman, inventor.
- Fernando Henrique Cardoso, president, was decorated with the Grand Cross
- Sergio Cabral Filho, senator and Governor of Rio de Janeiro, was decorated with the Grand Cross.
- José da Costa Carvalho, Marquis of Monte Alegre, regent and prime minister, was decorated with the Grand Cross.

== Brunei ==
- Hassanal Bolkiah (Grand Croix, 1996), Sultan of Brunei

== Burkina Faso ==
=== Chevalier ===
- Christine Kafando (2011), HIV/AIDS activist

== Cambodia ==
- Norodom Prohmbarirak, King of Cambodia, was awarded the Grand Cross in 1872.
- Norodom Sihanouk, king, prime minister, and chief of state of Cambodia, president of the State Presidium of Democratic Kampuchea.
- Sisowath Monivong, King of Cambodia
- Norodom Suramarit, King of Cambodia, awarded the grade of Commander in 1939 and Grand Officer.
- Norodom Sihamoni, current king of Cambodia, awarded grade of Grand Officer.

== Canada ==
- James Cameron, Canadian filmmaker and deep sea explorer appointed Officier de la Légion d'honneur in 2026.
- Jean Chapdelaine, Canadian diplomat and Quebec delegate-general to France.
- Jan de Vries, a Canadian paratrooper from the Second World War and veteran's advocate was named a Chevalier in 2004.
- Harry De Wolf, vice admiral and chief of the Naval Staff and former commanding officer of HMCS Haida
- Céline Dion, singer, appointed Chevalier de la Légion d'honneur
- Michaëlle Jean PC CC CMM CD FRCPSC(hon) (2014), former governor general of Canada. Awarded Grand Croix de la Légion d'honneur for "defending the liberty of the oppressed", her "strong links with France" and "eminent contribution to "Franco-Canadian friendship".
- Beverly McLachlin, Chief Justice of the Supreme Court, was made a Commander of the Legion of Honour by the Government of France in 2008
- Madeleine Meilleur, an Ontarian MPP and Minister Responsible for Francophone Affairs.
- Brian Mulroney, former prime minister of Canada, was presented the Legion of Honour in the rank of Commander, on 6 December 2016 by the French ambassador Nicolas Chapuis in Ottawa
- Blair Neatby, WWII veteran, 17th Duke of York's Royal Canadian Hussars, was awarded the Legion of Honour in the rank of Chevalier in November 2015 for his participation in the liberation of France
- Lance Corporal Joseph Novak, WWII Veteran. Royal Canadian Army Service Corps served in France, Belgium, The Netherlands. Awarded Chevalier de la Légion d'Honneur in 2021.
- Wilder Penfield, a Canadian neurosurgeon.
- Pascal Poirier, author, lawyer and Canada's longest-serving senator, he was honored as a Chevalier de la Légion d'Honneur in 1902.
- Captain George Richardson, World War I member of the Canadian Expeditionary Force, promoted to captain as a result of being the sole survivor in the battle of Saint-Julienin Number 2 Company.
- Arthur Britton Smith, World War II veteran
- Daniel Pauly (Chevalier, 2017), marine biologist. Awarded Chevalier de la Légion d'honneur for research on impact of fisheries on marine ecosystems.
- Donna Strickland CC FRS FRSC HonFInstP (Chevalier, 2017), optical physicist and Nobel Laureate. Awarded Chevalier de la Légion d'honneur in recognition of promoting scientific partnership between France and Canada.
- Harry Kulyk, First World War veteran who served with the 218th Battalion in England, the 6th Canadian Field Ambulance in France.
- Denis Villeneuve, The Quebecois filmmaker received the Chevalier of the Order of Arts and Letters de la Légion d'honneur.
- Fred "Ted" Paisley, Second World War veteran who served with the 1st Hussars in France

== Central African Republic ==
- Jean-Bédel Bokassa (Grand Croix, 1962) former president of the Central African Republic

== China ==
- C. T. Loo (1928). Art dealer
- Ma Chengyuan (1998). Archaeologist, director of Shanghai Museum
- Gong Li (2010). Actress, was appointed Commandeur for contributions to film
- Huai Jinpeng (2012). Scientist, academician and politician, was appointed Knight for contributions to education, science and technology development across China and France.
- Lisa Kishkin (2013)

== Colombia ==
- Ingrid Betancourt (Chevalier, 2008) former senator and anti-corruption activist
- Gabriel García Márquez (Commandeur, 1981), novelist, short-story writer, screenwriter and journalist
- Freddy Padilla de Leon, Colombian Army, General chief of staff of the Colombian Armed Forces, appointed Commandeur on 21 August 2008
- José Luis Esparza Guerrero, Colombian Army, alumnus of the French Ecole de Guerre, appointed Chevalier on 10 November 2015

== Comoros ==
- Said Ali bin Said Omar (Chevalier, 1910), Sultan of Grand Comore. Awarded Legion of Honor for formally abdicating his throne.

== Cuba ==
- Joseph Damingue (1761-1820), aka Hercule, was a major in Napoleon I's army.
- Baron Claudio Brindis de Salas Garrido (1852–1911). Famous violinist and musician.
- Dr. Carlos Finlay (1833–1915). Physician and scientist.
- Rafael Díaz Albertini (1857-1928). Famous violinist.
- Aniceto García Menocal (1836-1908). Civil engineer.
- Mario García Menocal (1866-1941). Cuban president. He received the Grand Cross.
- Gastón Mora y Varona (1863-1938). Lawyer and journalist.
- Dr. Francisco Domínguez Roldán (1864-1942). Politician and physician.
- Eduardo Sánchez de Fuentes (1874-1944). Composer and writer.
- José María Collantes (1877-1943). Lawyer, politician, and writer.
- Guillermo Belt (1903-1989). Diplomat. Mayor of Havana.
- Loipa Araújo (born 1941). Prima ballerina and ballet teacher
- Alicia Alonso (1920-2019). Cuban prima ballerina assoluta.
- Fulgencio Batista (1901–1973). Cuban president and dictator. He received the Grand Cross.
- Eusebio Leal (1942-2020). Historian.
- Josefina Méndez (1941–2007) (Post-mortem). Cuban Prima ballerina.
- Carlos Manuel de Céspedes y Quesada (1871–1939). Cuban president.
- José-Maria de Heredia (1842-1905). Cuban-born poet.
- Emilio Núñez Portuondo (1898–1978). Cuban American politician.
- Gonzalo de Quesada y Aróstegui (1868–1915). Cuban politician.
- Cosme de la Torriente y Peraza (1872–1956). Cuban politician.
- Dr. Joaquín Albarrán (1860–1912). Famous physician.
- Cardinal Jaime Lucas Ortega y Alamino (1936-2019). Cuban Catholic Church.
- Miguel Ángel de la Campa y Caraveda (1882-1965). Diplomat, lawyer and author.
- Juan Emilio Hernández Giró (1882-1953). Cuban painter.
- Dr. Luis Montané Dardé (1849-1936). Cuban physician.
- Joaquín Nin y Castellanos (1879-1949). Cuban musician.
- Alfredo Guevara (1925-2013). Cuban intellectual.
- Eduardo Torres Cuevas (1942-2025). Cuban historian and writer.
- Dr. Rodrigo Alvarez Cambras (1934-2023). Cuban physician.
- Vicente Vérez Bencomo (1953–Present). Cuban scientist.
- Emeterio Santovenia (1889-1968). Cuban intellectual and politician.

== Czech Republic ==
- Marie Chatardová (born 1963). Czech ambassador to France (2010–2016). Commander.
- Ludvík Svoboda (Grand Croix), former president of Czechoslovakia
- Tomáš Prouza (born 1973). Czech state secretary for EU affairs (2014–2017). Chevalier.
- Kateřina Šimáčková (born 1966). Czech Constitutional Court judge (2013–2021). Chevalier.
- Václav Havel (Grand Croix, 1990), former president of the Czech Republic
- Miloš Forman, Chevalier. Filmmaker (2004)
- Dominik Duka, Chevalier. (2012)
- Petr Pavel, Officer. (2012)
- Cyril Svoboda, Officer. (2012)
- Jan Sokol, Officer. (2008)
- Vladimír Špidla, Officer. (2016)
- Václav Malý, Chevalier. (2021)
- Eva Zažímalová, Chevalier. (2022)
- Petra Procházková, Chevalier. (2023)
- Otakar Motejl (2000)

== Dominican Republic ==
- Rafael Trujillo (Commandeur), military commander and dictator.
- Gregorio Luperón (1883), revolutionary, military general and former president of the Dominican Republic.

== Egypt ==
- Taha Hussein (Grand Officer), writer and philosopher
- Mahmoud Fakhry Pasha, ambassador of Egypt to France

Officier

- Mohamed Al-Fayed (1989) businessman. Awarded Legion of Honour for renovating Villa Windsor.

Chevalier

- Hazem Al Beblawi, Egyptian economist
- Abdel Fattah el-Sisi, Egyptian president
- Mona Zulficar, Egyptian lawyer

== Estonia ==
Grand Cross

- Konstantin Päts (1938), Estonian politician
- Lennart Meri (2001), Estonian politician, writer and film director

Grand Officer

- Karl Robert Pusta, Estonian diplomat
- Toomas Hendrik Ilves (2001), Estonian politician
- Siim Kallas (2001), Estonian politician
- Jüri Luik (2001), Estonian politician, Estonian minister of defence 1999-2002

Commander

- Johan Laidoner (1925), Estonian general and statesman
- Kristiina Ojuland (2001), Estonian politician
- Martin Herem (2021), Estonian general, commander of the Estonian Defence Forces since 2018

Officer

- Ain Kaalep (2001), Estonian poet, playwright and translator
- Riho Terras (2013), Estonian politician and former military officer

Chevalier

- Philippe Jourdan (2008)
- Arvo Pärt (2011), Estonian composer
- Rein Oja (2016), Estonian actor, stage director and theatre leader

== Fiji ==
- Sitiveni Rabuka CF OBE MSD (1980, 1995), former president of Fiji. Awarded Chevalier de la Légion d'honneur for his service in UNIFIL. He was promoted to Grand Officier for adopting a pro-French position during 1995-96 French nuclear tests.

== Finland ==
Grand Cross

- Carl Gustaf Emil Mannerheim (1939), military leader
- Kyösti Kallio (1939), president
- Urho Kekkonen (1958), president
- Karl-August Fagerholm (1958), Speaker of Parliament
- Veli Merikoski (1964), minister of foreign affairs
- Mauno Koivisto (1984), president
- Martti Ahtisaari (1999), president
- Tarja Halonen (2005), president
- Sauli Niinistö (2013), president

Commander

- Albert Edelfelt (1899, 1901) realist painter. Awarded Officier de la Légion d'honneur for his Louis Pasteur portrait. Promoted to Commandeur for his work in 1900 Paris Exposition.

== Georgia ==
Chevalier Grand-Croix de la Légion d'Honneur

- Mikheil Saakashvili, former president of Georgia.

Chevalier

- Bidzina Ivanishvili, Georgian politician, businessman, philanthropist and former prime minister of Georgia.

== Germany ==
Grand Cross

- Wilhelm I, German Emperor.
- Angela Merkel (2021), former Chancellor of Germany

Commandeur

- Peter Altmaier (Chevalier, 2004) politician
- Hartmut Bagger
- Karl Lagerfeld (2010), fashion designer
- Armin Laschet (2023), member of the Bundestag and former minister president of North Rhine-Westphalia
- Justus von Liebig, scientist
- Manfred Rommel (Officier, 1998; Commandeur, 2001) former mayor of Stuttgart
- Rudolf Virchow, physician and polymath

Officier

- Johann Wolfgang von Goethe (Chevalier, 1808; Officier, 1818), writer and polymath
- Horst Köhler (1995) former president of Germany
- Annegret Kramp-Karrenbauer (2016) former Minister of Defense
- Rudolf Mößbauer
- Michael Schumacher (2010), former racing driver
- Paul Spiegel
- Richard Strauss (Officier, 1914; Chevalier, 1907) conductor and composer.
- Margarethe von Trotta
- Friedrich Wöhler ForMemRS HonFRSE (1827), chemist. Awarded the Croix d'Officier for isolating aluminium in pure form.

Chevalier

- Peter von Cornelius
- Christoph Eschenbach
- Bernhard Schlink (Chevalier, 2002) lawyer, academic and novelist
- Peter Stein
- Heinrich Strobel, musicologist (1957) appointed Chevalier for his support and promotion of New Music.
- Stephan Toscani (Chevalier, 2013), politician, member of the Landtag of Saarland.

== Greece ==
Grand Cross

- Basil Zaharoff (Chevalier, 1908; Officier, 1913; Commandeur, 1914; Grand Officier, 1918), arms dealer and industrialist

Chevalier

- Ilias Lalaounis, pioneer of Greek jewelry and an internationally renowned goldsmith
- Spyridon Flogaitis, professor of public law at the University of Athens and former judge
- Marianna Vardinoyannis, UNESCO ambassador and head of the Elpida (Hope) Children's Oncology Hospital in Athens
- Dora Bakoyannis, Greek politician
- Yiannis Boutaris, Mayor of Thessaloniki, businessman, winemaker

== Guinea ==
- Dinah Salifou (Chevalier, 1889), last king of the Nalu people.

== Haiti ==
- Lucien Hibbert, Haitian government minister and mathematician, was a Commander in the Légion d'Honneur.

== Hong Kong ==
- Anson Chan (2009), former chief secretary. Awarded Legion of Honour for promoting gender equality, freedom of press and democratic debate
- Wong Kar Wai (2006), director, was accorded the Chevalier de la Légion d'honneur
- Carrie Lam (2015), for her longstanding support for French presence in Hong Kong, as well as for the friendship between France and Hong Kong.
- John Slosar (Chevalier, 2015), former CEO and chairman of Cathay Pacific
- Sir Hormusjee Naorojee Mody, Indian-born Hong Kong businessman and philanthropist. The French government conferred the Legion of Honour on him before June 1911.

== Hungary ==
- Árpád Göncz, former president of Hungary
- Katalin Novák (Chevalier, 2019), former president of Hungary.

== India ==
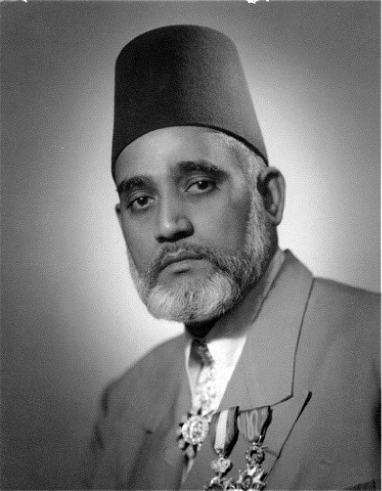
Janab JM Abdul Aziz of Saigon born in Koothanallur wears the Legion on his left among other Orders

Grand Cross

Name	Year awarded	Previous awards	Notability	References
Maharaja Bhupinder Singh of Patiala	1930	Grand Officer: 1918		
Maharaja Jagatjit Singh of Kapurthala	1926			
Narendra Modi	2023		Prime Minister of India	

Grand Officer

Name	Year awarded	Notability	References
Maharaja Pratap Singh of Idar	1918		
Maharaja Hari Singh of Kashmir	1938		
Sardar Hardit Malik	1956	Indian Ambassador to France (1949–1956)	

Commander

Name	Year awarded	Notability	References
J. R. D. Tata	1983	Philanthropist, father of Indian Aviation and former chairman of Tata Sons from 1938 to 1991	
Manna Dey	1985	Musician	
Satyajit Ray	1987	Filmmaker	
Pt. Ravi Shankar	2000	Classical Hindustani composer and musician	
Amartya Sen	2013	Economist and philosopher	
S. H. Raza	2015	Painter	
Ratan Tata	2016	Businessman, investor, philanthropist and former and present interim chairman of Tata Sons	

Officer

Name	Year awarded	Notability	References
Sajjan Singh of Ratlam	1918	Maharaja of Ratlam State	
Gursaran Talwar	1991	Immunologist and founder director of National Institute of Immunology	
Krishnaswamy Kasturirangan	2002	Space scientist and former chairman of Indian Space Research Organisation	
Ela Bhatt	2006	Founder of Self-Employed Women's Association of India	
Rajendra K. Pachauri	2006	Environmentalist, former chairman of Intergovernmental Panel on Climate Change	
Amitabh Bachchan	2007	Actor	
Lata Mangeshkar	2007	Playback singer	
N. R. Narayana Murthy	2008	Businessman and co-founder of Infosys	
Yash Chopra	2008	Film director and film producer	
Yashwant Sinha	2015	Civil servant and politician. Former Minister of Finance and Minister of External Affairs	
Ajay Mathur	2016	Director General of International Solar Alliance	
Shobhana Bhartia	2016	Businesswoman and journalist	
General Joginder Jaswant Singh	2016	Politician and former Chief of Army Staff	

Knight

Name	Year awarded	Notability	References
Harihar Seth	1934	Bengali historian	
S. R. Rana	1951	Political activist	
Pushpa Mittra Bhargava	1998	Scientist, administrator and founder director of Centre for Cellular and Molecular Biology	
Zubin Mehta	2001	Conductor	
Dileep Padgaonkar	2002	Journalist and former editor of The Times of India	
C. N. R. Rao	2005	Chemist and head of the Scientific Advisory Council to the Prime Minister of India	
E. Sreedharan	2005	Technocrat and India's Metroman	
Cedric Prakash	2006	Human Rights and Peace Activist, Journalist	
G. R. Gopinath	2006	Founder and chairman of Air Deccan	
Lata Mangeshkar	2006	Playback singer	
Arun Nanda	2008	Former Executive Director of Mahindra & Mahindra	
Nadir Godrej	2008	Industrialist and managing director of Godrej Industries	
Nallam Venkataramayya	2008	Physician and surgeon	
Deepak Parekh	2010	Businessman and former chairman of HDFC	
Muthuswamy Varadarajan	2010	Civil servant	
Baba Kalyani	2011	Industrialist and Chairman of Bharat Forge	
Rahul Bajaj	2011	Former chairman of Bajaj Group	
N. S. Ramanuja Tatacharya	2012	Sanskrit scholar, author and researcher	
Anjali Gopalan	2013	Executive director, The Naz Foundation India Trust, Advocate for LGBT rights and children and mothers living with HIV.	
Madeleine Herman de Blic	2013	Social worker and humanist	
Shah Rukh Khan	2014	Actor and producer.	
A. S. Kiran Kumar	2016	Space scientist and former chairman of ISRO	
Anand Mahindra	2016	Chairman and managing director of Mahindra & Mahindra	
Kiran Mazumdar Shaw	2016	Entrepreneur, executive chairperson and founder of Biocon	
Manish Arora	2016	Punjabi fashion designer	
Pramod Kapoor	2016	Publisher, founder of Roli Books	
Raj Rewal	2016	Architect	
Raja Mohan	2016	Academic, journalist and foreign policy analyst	
Sakti Burman	2016	Artist	
Bharti Sharma	2017	Activist and former chairperson of Child Welfare Committee, New Delhi	
Prem Shankar Jha	2017	Economist and journalist	
Soumitra Chatterjee	2017	Bengali actor	
Aruna Jayanthi	2018	Businesswoman and former CEO of Capgemini India	
Azim Premji	2018	Founder and chairman of Wipro & Azim Premji Foundation	
Shashi Tharoor	2022	Politician, public intellectual, writer and former diplomat	
Swati Piramal	2022	Vice Chairperson of Piramal Group	
Natarajan Chandrasekaran	2023	Chairman of Tata Sons	
V. R. Lalithambika	2023	Scientist at ISRO	

- Jagadish Chandra Bose, polymath
- S. Bhoothalingam(1983), economist and civil servant

== Indonesia ==
- Soeharto (1921-2008), Grand Croix, president of Indonesia
- Prabowo Subianto (born 1951), Grand Croix, president of Indonesia (2025)
- Hamengkubuwono IX (1912-1988), Grand Officier, Vice President of Indonesia (1987)
- Tjokropranolo (1924-1998), Grand Officier, Governor of Jakarta
- B. J. Habibie (1936-2019), Grand Officier, Minister of Research and Technology of Indonesia (1997)
- Try Sutrisno (born 1935), Commandeur, Commander of the Indonesian National Armed Forces (1989)
- Ali Alatas (1932-2008), Commandeur, Foreign Minister of Indonesia (2003)
- Arrmanatha Nasir (born 1971), Commandeur, Indonesian Ambassador to France, Andorra, Monaco, and the UNESCO (2021)
- Sjafrie Sjamsoeddin (born 1952), Commandeur, Minister of Defense of Indonesia (2025)
- Mochammad Sanoesi, (1935-2008), Commandeur, Chief of the Indonesian National Police
- Mochtar Kusumaatmadja, (1929-2021), Commandeur, Foreign Minister of Indonesia (1989)
- Ignasius Jonan, (born 1963), Chevalier, Indonesian Minister of Transportation (2016)

== Iran ==
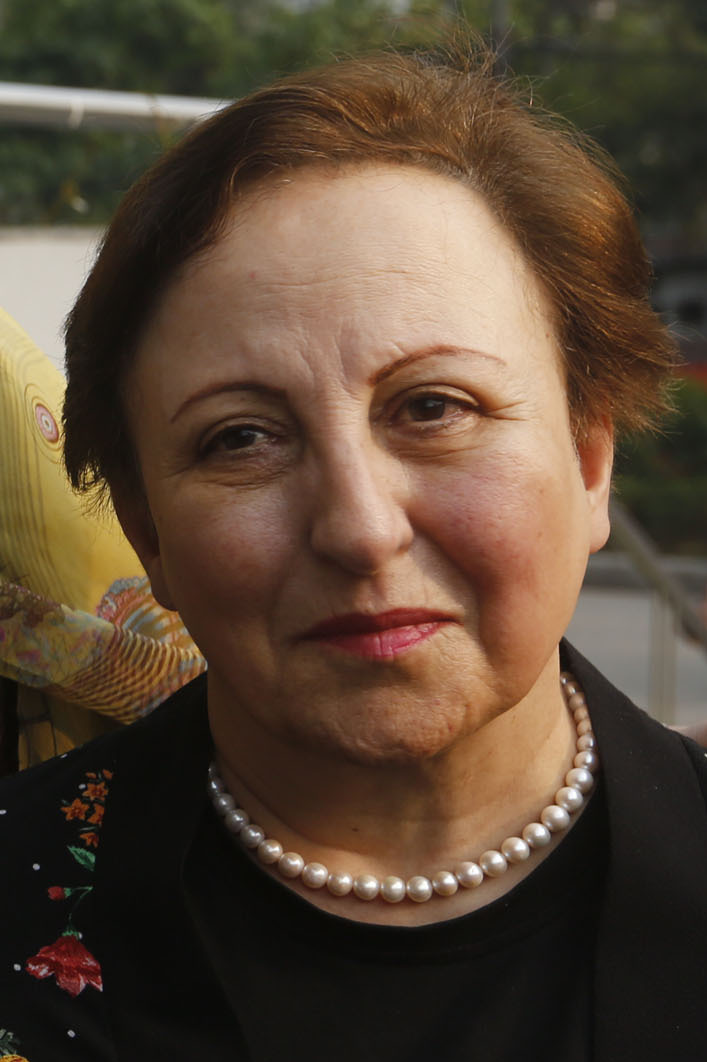
Shirin Ebadi, a human rights lawyer and a Nobel Prize laureate

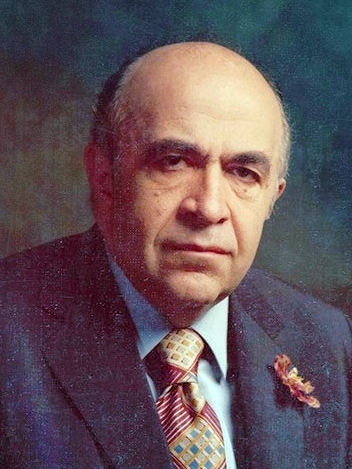
Amir-Abbas Hoveyda, the former prime minister of Iran and secretary-general of the Rastakhiz Party

- Ali Amini (1962), former prime minister; Grand Croix
- Bahram Aryana (1966), former chief of staff of the Armed Forces; Grand Officer
- Safi Asfia, engineer and statesman; Commandeur
- Amir-Abbas Hoveyda (posthumous), former prime minister; Commandeur
- Mohammad Gharib (1954), pediatrician
- Shirin Ebadi (2006), human rights lawyer
- Ahmad Nafisi (1962), mayor of Tehran
- Mohsen Rais, (1947), ambassador and cabinet minister, Grand Officer
- Ali-Akbar Siassi, Iranian intellectual, psychologist and politician, Commandeur.
- Nasrine Seraji (2011), architect
- Gholam Hossein Amirkhani (2017), calligrapher

== Iraq ==
Chevalier

- Talib Shaghati (2017), General, head of the Iraqi Counter Terrorism Service during 2007–2020.
- Abdel-Wahab al-Saadi (2022), General, head of the Iraqi Counter Terrorism Service during 2020–2023.

== Ireland ==
- Patrick James Smyth, Irish revolutionary and politician. Smyth was made a Chevalier in 1871 in recognition of his efforts organising an Irish ambulance service who aided the French Army during the Franco-Prussian War of 1870.
- Joseph O'Kelly (1828–1885), Franco-Irish composer and pianist, "Chevalier" in 1881
- Henri O'Kelly (1859–1938), Franco-Irish composer and church musician, "Chevalier" in 1931
- Edward Westby Donovan, who fought in the Crimean War, was appointed Chevalier de la Légion d'Honneur
- Mary Ryan (15 July 1935), Professor of French at University College Cork, first woman professor on island of Ireland. Awarded the Légion d'Honneur for services to the French language.
- Monsignor Professor Brendan Devlin (November 2001), scholar in the French and Irish languages and rector of the Irish College in Paris, was invested as an Officier de la Légion d'Honneur.
- Alan Dukes (2004), former Irish minister and former leader of Fine Gael is an Officier de la Légion d'Honneur
- Dawood Ishaq "David" Syed (2010), an Irish lawyer was appointed Chevalier (Knight) de la Légion d'Honneur by the French Ministry for Foreign and European Affairs under President Nicolas Sarkozy.
- Mary Lawlor (3 July 2014), founder and executive director of human rights organisation Front Line Defenders was awarded the Insignia of Chevalier of the Legion of Honour on behalf of the French government by French Ambassador to Ireland Mr Jean-Pierre Thebault
- Martin Naughton, Irish businessman, founder of the Glen Dimplex group, and philanthropist was invested as an Officier de la Légion d'Honneur in November 2016
- Barbara Wright (25 September 2019), Professor Emerita of French at Trinity College, Dublin, eminent scholar of French literature and art history, was appointed Chevalier (Knight) de la Légion d'Honneur by French president Emmanuel Macron and awarded the medal by the French Ambassador to Ireland, Stéphane Crouzat.

== Israel ==
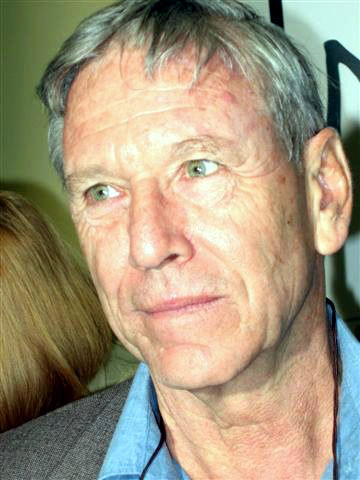
Amos Oz

- Binyamin Amirà (1966), mathematician
- Aharon Nahmias, Paris, (26 April 1989). Was appointed Chevalier, 10–11 Knesset member, Deputy Speaker of the Knesset and mayor of the city of Safed.
- Amos Oz (1997), writer, journalist

== Italy ==
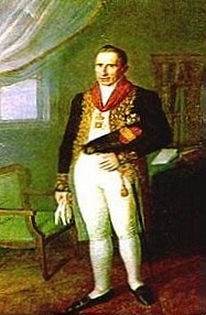
Giustino Fortunato, prime minister of the Kingdom of the Two Sicilies

- Massimo d'Alema (Grand Officier, 2001), former prime minister of Italy
- Michelangelo Antonioni (Chevalier, 1996) director and filmmaker
- Giorgio Armani (Officier, 2010), fashion designer, founder of Armani
- Corrado Augias (1935–2026), Chevalier, 2007. Augias returned the title on 14 December 2020, deeply disappointed by French president Macron giving the same title to Egyptian president Abdel Fattah el-Sisi and in solidarity with Giulio Regeni, killed by the Egyptian regime in 2016.
- Gae Aulenti (Chevalier, 1987), architect and designer
- Monica Bellucci (born 1964), Italian actress and model. She received the Knight of the Legion of Honour on 24 November 2016 by François Hollande.
- Carlo de Benedetti (Officier, 1987; Commandeur, 2015), industrialist, engineer and publisher
- Gilberto Benetton (Chevalier, 2011), businessman, co-founder of Benetton Group
- Giorgio Giacomelli (Chevalier, 1991), diplomat
- Emma Bonino (Officer, 2009), politician
- Claudia Cardinale (Grand Officier, 2019), actress
- Luciana Castellina (born 1929), she returned the title in December 2020, deeply disappointed by French president Macron giving the same title to Egyptian dictator Abdel Fattah el-Sisi and in solidarity with Giulio Regeni, killed by the Egyptian regime in 2016.
- Sergio Cofferati (born 1948), he returned the title in December 2020, deeply disappointed by French president Macron giving the same title to Egyptian dictator Abdel Fattah el-Sisi and in solidarity with Giulio Regeni, killed by the Egyptian regime in 2016.
- Umberto Eco (Chevalier, 1993; Officier, 2003, Commandeur, 2012) historian, literary critic and philosopher
- Federico Fellini (1920-1993), in 1984.
- Giustino Fortunato (1777–1862), was decorated with the Grand Cross
- Enrico Letta (born 1966), National Order - Officer, 25 March 2016.
- Gianni Letta (Chevalier, 2009), former Secretary of the Council of Ministers
- Sophia Loren OMRI (Chevalier, 1991), actress.
- Giovanna Melandri (born 1962), she received the title on 19 September 2003, and returned it in December 2020, deeply disappointed by French president Macron giving the same title to Egyptian dictator Abdel Fattah el-Sisi and in solidarity with Giulio Regeni, killed by the Egyptian regime in 2016.
- Benito Mussolini (Grand Croix, 1923), dictator and former prime minister of Italy
- Riccardo Muti OMRI GCSG (Chevalier; Officier, 2010; Commandeur, 2024), conductor
- Boris PahorOMRI (Chevalier, 2007), Slovene writer.
- Romano Prodi (born 1939), Chevalier, 13 February 2014.
- Cesare Romiti (1923–2020), Officer
- Bernardo Secchi (1934 - 2015, Milan, Italy), a prominent urban planner and architect, he was made a Chevalier in 2010.
- Franca Sozzani (1950-2016), Editor-in-chief of Vogue Italia, was made a Knight of the Legion of Honour in March 2012.
- Valentino (2006) fashion designer, founder of Valentino
- Giuseppe Verdi (1813-1901), Grand-Croix, 1894.
- Alessandro Volta (1745-1827), Chevalier, 26 August 1806

== Ivory Coast ==
- Tidjane Thiam (Chevalier, 2011) businessman, former CEO of Credit Suisse and Prudential

== Japan ==
Of 1,500 non-French recipients, 1/10 are Japanese

- Akihito, the Emperor Emeritus, was appointed Grand Croix
- Chiaki Mukai (2015), the first female Asian astronaut, was appointed Chevalier
- Mikitani Hiroshi (2014), entrepreneur and founder of Rakuten
- Riyoko Ikeda (2009), author of the popular manga series The Rose of Versailles, was appointed Chevalier in 2009.
- Kiyoshi Sumiya, was appointed Commandeur in 1994
- Toyoda Shoichiro (2005), former chairman of Toyota Motor Corporation, was appointed Commandeur in 1998, Grand Officier in 2005

== Jordan ==
- Awn Al-Khasawneh, former prime minister of Jordan, former judge and vice-president of the International Court of Justice, Grand Officier.
- Abdullah Ensour, economist who was Prime Minister of Jordan between October 2012 and May 2016; has held various cabinet positions in Jordanian government in addition to being prime minister
- Dina Kawar, a binational Jordanian diplomat who was the ambassador of Jordan to France in 2003

== Kenya ==
- Wangari Maathai (2006) social, environmental and political activist

== Kuwait ==
- Sabah Al-Ahmad Al-Jaber Al-Sabah (30 November 2006)
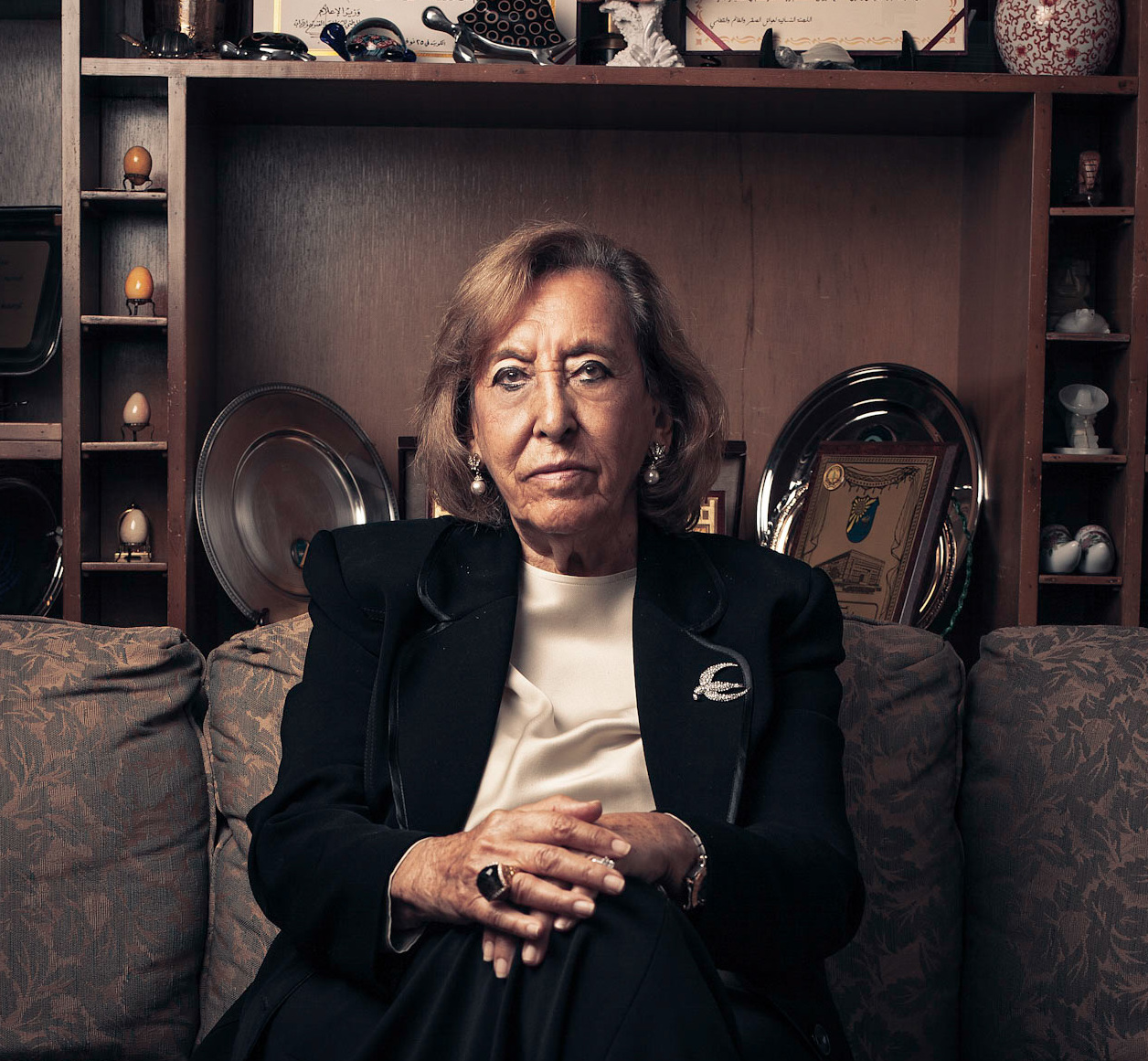
- Lulwah Al-Qatami
  Lulwah Al-Qatami, educator and activist, first woman from Kuwait to attend university overseas, Nobel Peace Prize nominee, former director of the Women's College of Kuwait University.

== Lebanon ==
- Fairuz, (1998 and 2020) singer.
- Jamil Al Sayyed, (Commandeur; 2002) Major General, former director general of the General Directorate of General Security and current member of parliament.
- Adnan Kassar, businessman, former head of International Chamber of Commerce (ICC) and former cabinet minister
- Nawaf Salam, diplomat.
- Ayman Hariri (Chevalier), businessman
- Rafic Hariri (Grand Croix), businessman and former prime minister of Lebanon
- Saad Hariri, (2007) politician
- Ziyad Baroud, (officier; 2011) former Minister of Interior and Municipalities and prominent civil society activist
- May Arida (Knight, 1978), supporter of the arts and international exchange.
- Lamia Moubayed Bissat (Knight, 2015)
- Melhem Karam (1985), journalist
- Giselle Khoury (2019), journalist
- Jihad Azour (2011), economist and politician.

== Liberia ==
- Ellen Johnson Sirleaf (Grand Croix, 2012), former president of Liberia.

== Luxembourg ==
- Jean-Claude Juncker (Grand Officier, 2002) former prime minister of Luxembourg and president of the European Commission

== North Macedonia ==
- Jadranka Chaushevska Dimov, (2025 Commandeur de la Légion d'honneur), diplomat, former ambassador to France and permanent delegate to UNESCO.
- Nano Ružin (2012) Professor of political sciences, Macedonian Ambassador to NATO and presidential candidate of the Liberal Democratic Party of Macedonia (LDP) in 2009.
- Luan Starova, (2017), writer, translator, diplomat

== Madagascar ==
- Marie-Louise, last heiress apparent to the throne of the Kingdom of Madagascar. Awarded Legion of Honour for her medical services during World War II.
- Ranavalona III (Grand Croix, 1888), last sovereign of the Kingdom of Madagascar.
- Philibert Tsiranana (Grand Croix, 1960) former president of Madagascar

== Malaysia ==
- Admiral Mohammad Anwar Mohammad Nor, Chief of Defence Force of Malaysia (2007)
- Mizan Zainal Abidin of Terengganu (2010), 13th King of Malaysia, was appointed Commander of the National Order of the Legion of Honour
- Ambiga Sreenevasan (2011), a Malaysian lawyer who served as the president of the Malaysian Bar Council.
- Michelle Yeoh (Chevalier, 2007; Officier, 2012), actress, dancer, and model. Awarded Chevalier in 2007 for contributions of films and media,
- Sharafuddin of Selangor (2012), 9th Sultan of Selangor, was appointed Commander of the National Order of the Legion of Honour.
- Tony Fernandes (2013), co-founder of budget airline AirAsia, was appointed Commander of the National Order of the Legion of Honour
- Marina Mahathir (2016), Malaysian socio-political activist and writer, was conferred the Chevalier de la Légion d'Honneur by the French government for "her voice and charisma to many causes", citing her work with the Malaysian AIDS Council and with migrants
- Muhammad V of Kelantan (2017), 15th King of Malaysia
- Admiral Ahmad Kamarulzaman, Chief of Royal Malaysian Navy (2018)
- General Affendy Buang, Chief of Defence Force (2020) conferred Commandeur Legion d'Honneur on 19 May 2026

== Mali ==
- Aguibu Tall, Faama of Dinguiraye and Macina

== Mauritius ==
Grand Officer

- Seewoosagur Ramgoolam (1973)
- Navin Ramgoolam (2006)

Commander

- Gaëtan Duval (1973)

Officier

- Beergoonath Ghurburrun (2009)

== Mexico ==
Grand Cross

- Octavio Paz (1994) poet and diplomat

Grand Officer

- Mariano Francisco Saynez Mendoza (2010), Admiral

Officer

- Jorge Armando Barriguete Meléndez (2010), physician
- Gael García Bernal (2026), actor

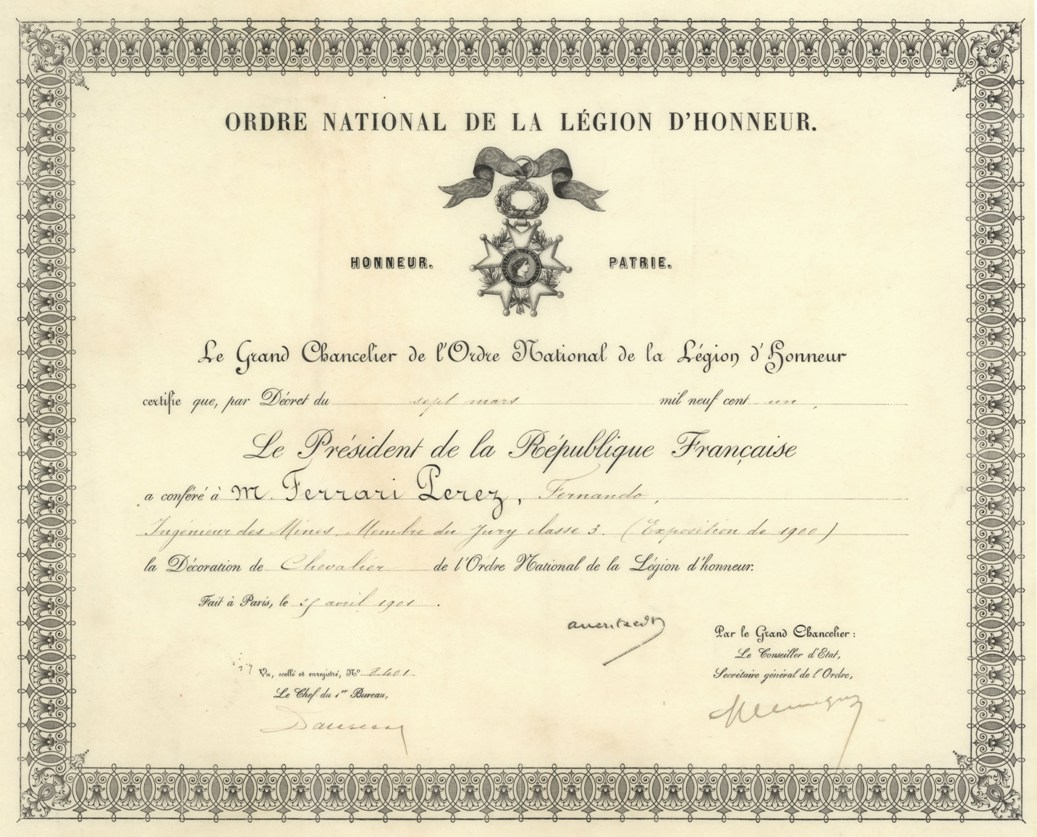
1901 – Caballero – Légion d'honneur – Fernando Ferrari Pérez

Chevalier

- Fernando Ferrari-Pérez (1901), naturalist, photographer, statesman.
- José María Cajica Camacho (1954), jurist.
- Manuel Mondragón, General.
- María Félix (1996), actress
- Jesús Kumate Rodríguez, physician
- Guadalupe Loaeza (2003), writer.
- Jacobo Zabludovsky (2004), journalist
- Salma Hayek (2012), actress
- Mario J. Molina (2012), chemist
- Carmen Aristegui (2012), journalist
- Bernardo Gómez-Pimienta (2007)
- Octavio Paredes López (2013)
- Gabriela Cuevas (2017)
- Agustín Flakito Acosta Azcón (2022)
- José Sarukhán Kermez (2025), scientist

== Monaco ==
- Louis II (Grand Croix), former Prince of Monaco
- Rainier III (Chevalier), former Prince of Monaco

== Morocco ==
Grand Cross

- Thami El Glaoui (1925), Pasha of Marrakesh

== Nepal ==
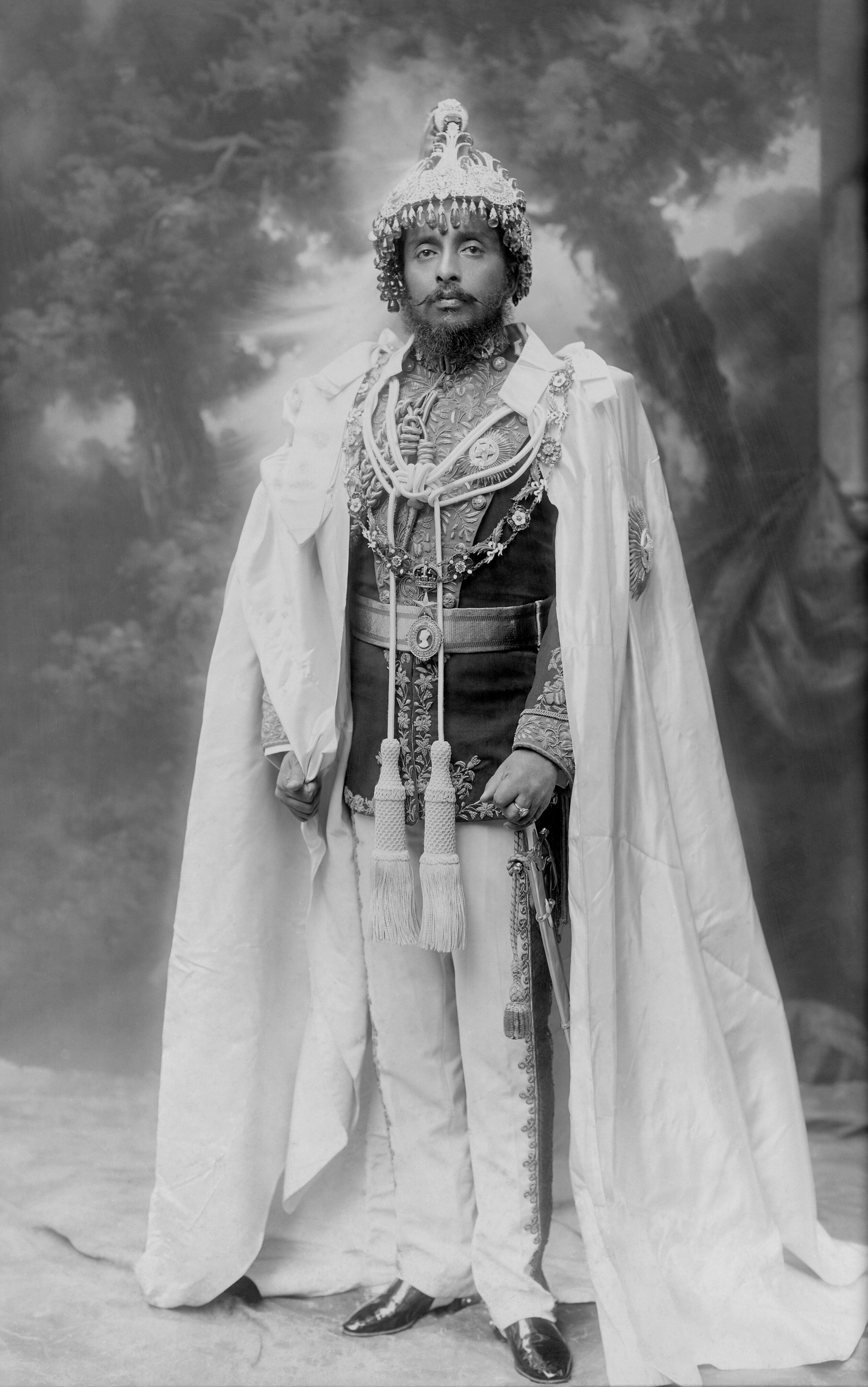
Chandra Shamsher

Grand Cross

- King Tribhuvan of Nepal (1954)
- King Mahendra of Nepal (1956)
- King Birendra of Nepal (1983)
- Maharaja Chandra Shamsher Jang Bahadur Rana, Prime Minister of Nepal (1929; Grand Officer: 1925)
- Maharaja Juddha Shamsher Jang Bahadur Rana, Prime Minister of Nepal (1934)
- Maharaja Mohan Shamsher Jang Bahadur Rana, Prime Minister of Nepal (1949)
- Maharajkumar Shanker Shamsher Jang Bahadur Rana, Ambassador to France (1949)

Grand Officer

- Maharajkumar Kaiser Shumsher Jang Bahadur Rana, Director-General of Foreign Affairs (1934)

== Netherlands ==
Grand Cross

- Willem-Alexander of the Netherlands (2014), King of the Netherlands
- Queen Máxima of the Netherlands (2022)
- Willem Drees (1954), Prime Minister of the Netherlands
- Joseph Luns (1954), diplomat, Minister of Foreign Affairs and the 5th secretary general of NATO.
- Carel Hendrik Ver Huell (1806), Dutch (and later French) admiral who served in the Napoleonic Wars

Commander

- Hans van Mierlo (1999), politician, Minister of Defence, Minister of Foreign Affairs, Deputy Prime Minister and founder of Democrats 66

Officer

- David Hendrik Chassé (1830/1832), general
- Hella Haasse (2000), writer
- Ernst Hirsch Ballin (2014), politician, Minister of Justice and Minister of the Interior and Kingdom Relations
- Mark Rutte (2023), Prime Minister of the Netherlands
- Maria van der Hoeven (2008), politician and executive director of the International Energy Agency
- Leo van Wijk (2005), executive, and former president and CEO of KLM and vice-chairman of Air France-KLM
- Jannie Brombacher (1984), major in Royal Netherlands Army.
- Willem Visser 't Hooft (1959), theologian and former secretary general of the World Council of Churches

Chevalier

- Geert Mak (2009), Dutch journalist and a non-fiction writer
- Winy Maas (2011), Dutch architect and Urban planner

== New Zealand ==
Grand Officer

- William Fergusson Massey (1921), former prime minister, appointed Grand Officier in recognition of New Zealand's contribution during World War I

Commander

- Sir Francis Dillon Bell KCMG CB MLC (1889), politician and New Zealand representative at the 1889 Paris World fair and exhibition
- Lieutenant Colonel James Waddell (1920), officer in the French Foreign Legion during World War I. Appointed Chevalier in 1915, and Officier in 1917
- Air Marshal Sir Charles Roderick Carr KBE, CB, DFC, AFC (1945), for service as Deputy Chief of Staff (Air) Allied Supreme Headquarters France during World War II
- Sir Archibald McIndoe CBE FRCS (1946), plastic surgeon who worked for the Royal Air Force rehabilitating badly burned aircrew during World War II
- Jean Robertson McKenzie CBE (1956), diplomat and first chargé d'affaires to the newly opened New Zealand diplomatic post in Paris
- Air Chief Marshal Sir Denis Hensley Fulton Barnett GCB CBE DFC (1958), for service as Commander of the Allied Air Task Force for Operation Musketeer during the 1956 Suez Crisis

Officer

- Thomas William Hislop (1889), politician and New Zealand representative at the 1889 Paris World fair and exhibition
- Sir Walter Lawry Buller KCMG (1889), politician, naturalist and ornithologist who displayed at the 1889 Paris World fair and exhibition
- Major General George Napier Johnston CB CMG DSO (1917), New Zealand Army officer and Commander New Zealand Division Artillery in France during World War I
- Major General Sir William Livingston Hatchwell Sinclair-Burgess KBE CB CMG DSO (1917), a New Zealand Army Officer attached to the Australian Army Artillery in France during World War I
- Major General Sir Andrew Hamilton Russell KCB KCMG (1919), New Zealand Army officer and Commander of the New Zealand Division on the Western Front during World War I
- Colonel Sir James Allen GCMG KCB (1922), Minister of Defence during World War I
- Air Marshal Sir Arthur "Mary" Coningham KCB KBE DSO MC DFC AFC (1943) for service as Air Officer Commanding-in-Chief 2nd Tactical Air Force in France during World War II
- Nancy Wake AC GM (1988), member of the French Resistance and Special Operations Executive during World War II. Appointed Chevalier in 1970
- Professor John Dunmore CMNZ (2007), academic, author on French history in the Pacific and long-time president of the New Zealand Federation des Alliances Francaises

Chevalier

- Jean Michel Camille Malfroy(1889), New Zealand representative at the 1889 Paris World fair and exhibition.
- Major General Robert Young KCB CMG DSO (1916), New Zealand Army officer in recognition of services on Gallipoli
- Henry William F. Trousselot (1860 - 1926) for twarting a mutiny. C. 1875. At the time Trousselot was a young Englishman (born in Channel Islands) but later emigrated and settled in New Zealand. Trousselot Park in Kaiapoi, (Canterbury) is named after him.
- Major Norman Frederick Hastings DSO (1916), New Zealand Army officer in recognition of services on Gallipoli
- Major General Sir George Spafford Richardson KBE (1916), New Zealand Army officer attached to the Royal Navy Division on Gallipoli
- Major Thomas Broun (1917), believed to be belated award for relief of the besieged French Settlement at Pondicherry during the Indian Mutiny in 1857.
- Brigadier General Robert O'Hara Livesay CMG DSO (1917), British Army officer attached to the New Zealand Division on the Western Front during World War I
- Lieutenant James Lloyd Findlay MC (1917), New Zealand officer with the East Surrey Regiment on the Western Front during World War I
- Lieutenant Colonel Cuthbert Trelawder MacLean DSO MC (1918), a New Zealand Royal Flying Corps and Royal Air Force officer during World War I
- Lieutenant Colonel Charles Hellier Davies Evans DSO (1919), Commander of the New Zealand Cyclist Corps on the Western Front during World War I
- Brigadier James Hargest CBE DSO & 2 bars MC ED MP (1919), New Zealand Army officer on the Western Front during World War I
- Colonel Robert Logan CB (1919), New Zealand Army officer and Administrator of Samoa during World War I in "recognition of valuable services"
- Colonel Sir Robert Heaton Rhodes KCVO KBE VD (1920), politician and special commissioner to the Red Cross during World War I
- Major General Alfred William Robin KCMG CB (1922), Commandant of New Zealand Military Forces during World War I
- John Alexander (1934), president of the Auckland Branch of the Navy League and host of French Warship visits to Auckland
- George William Hutchison (1934), Mayor of Auckland City and host to French Naval visits to Auckland
- Bishop Francis William Mary Redwood (1934), Roman Catholic Archbishop of Wellington, Metropolitan of New Zealand
- Miss Jean Gardner Batten CBE OSC (1936), aviator
- Commander Charles Henry Tarr Palmer (1938), president of the Auckland Branch of the Navy League of New Zealand and host to French Warship visits
- Sir Ernest Hyam Davies (1938), Mayor of Auckland City and host to French Naval visits to Auckland
- Bishop James Michael Liston CMG (1938) Roman Catholic Bishop of Auckland during the centenary of the Catholic Church in New Zealand
- Sir Carrick Hey Robertson (1938), surgeon
- Air Vice Marshal William Vernon "Bill" Crawford-Crompton CB CBE DSO & Bar DFC & Bar (1944), New Zealand-born pilot and air ace of the Second World War
- Patrick Joseph Twomey (1956), marist brother and leprosy fund raiser
- Doctor Roy Granville McElroy CMG (1970), Honorary Consular Agent of France in Auckland from 1948 to 1972.
- Doctor Leslie Cecil Lloyd Averill (1973), first up the ladder during the liberation of Le Quesnoy in 1918, in commemoration of World War I
- Bright Ernest Williams (1998), veteran of the Western Front in commemoration of the 80th anniversary of the end of World War I
- Darrell Tryon (2004), linguist. Awarded Legion of Honour for promoting Franco-Australian scientific collaboration.
- Squadron Leader John Gordon Pattison DSO DFC (2004), World War II fighter pilot in commemoration of the 60th anniversary of the Normandy landings
- Dame Fiona Judith Kidman DNZM OBE (2009) novelist, poet, scriptwriter and short story author
- Te Rongotoa "Tia" Barrett (2011), diplomat
- Phyllis Latour MBE (2014), SOE agent

== Nigeria ==
- Mike Adenuga is a Nigerian billionaire businessman, and the third richest person in Africa, awarded in 2018.
- Phillip Asiodu is a Nigerian politician.
- Wole Soyinka CFR HonFRSL (1989) playwright, novelist, poet and essayist

== Norway ==
Grand-Croix

- Haakon VII of Norway
- Harald V of Norway
- Olav V of Norway

Grand Officer

- Claus Helberg
- Otto Ruge

Commander

- Arne Dagfin Dahl
- Thorbjørn Jagland
- Erik Kristoffersen

Officer

- Theodor Broch
- Col. Birger Eriksen, for the Battle of Drøbak Sound in 1940 during World War II
- Ole Henrik Moe

Chevalier

- Eyvind Hellstrøm Norwegian chef and former owner of a two-Michelin-starred restaurant in the city of Oslo. He received the honor because he has been positive about France for a long time and promoted the country and its culture and been an advocate for French values through his work as chef and a number of books written
- Asbjørn Aarnes Hans Reidar Holtermann
- Kristian Løken
- Thorvald Nilsen
- Arne Sunde
- Odd Isaachsen Willoch

== Pakistan ==
- Saeed Akhtar Malik, former naval officer, former aide de camp to the second president of Pakistan Ayub Khan, former director For Regional Bureau of Eastern Europe WFP (World Food Programme) current leader of Bright Star Mobile Library (BSML).
- Mian Hayaud Din HJ MBE MC, military officer and former chief of General Staff. Awarded Legion of Honour for his services in the First Indochina War.
- Ahmad Hasan Dani, intellectual, archaeologist, historian, and linguist, awarded in 1998
- Asma Jahangir, prominent Pakistani legal expert and human rights activist, awarded in 2014
- Nawab Ashiq Hussain Qureshi, cricketer, honorary French consul general in Lahore 2008–2018.
- Muhammad Amjad Khan Niazi, admiral and current chief of Naval Staff of the Pakistan Navy
- Rao Qamar Suleman, air chief marshal, chief of air staff, (Pakistan Air Force) 2009-2012.

== Palestine ==
- Aqil Agha (1861), strongman. Awarded Legion of Honour for protecting Christians in Galilee and Nazareth during the Syrian crisis of 1860.

== Panama ==
- Roberto Roy, Minister of Canal Affairs of Panama

== Paraguay ==
Commander

- Francisco Solano López, military and statesman. Awarded by Napoleón III in 1854 for eminent merits.

Chevalier

- Augusto Roa Bastos, writer.

== Peru ==
- Manuel Pulgar-Vidal, lawyer.

== Philippines ==
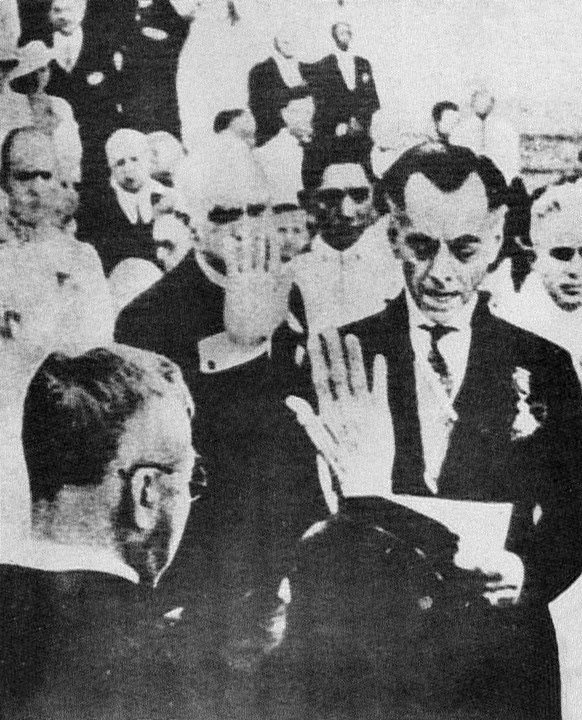
Commonwealth President Manuel Quezon wearing the Legion of Honor during his inauguration in 1935.

Grand-Croix

- Corazon C. Aquino, president
- Teodoro Benigno, journalist
- Jose de Venecia Jr., Speaker of the House of Representatives
- Manuel L. Quezon, President of the Commonwealth of the Philippines
- Fidel V. Ramos, president
- Carlos P. Romulo, Minister of Foreign Affairs

Grand Officer

- Elpidio Quirino, president

Commander

- Leticia Ramos-Shahani, Senator

Officer

- Basilio Valdes, Secretary of National Defense
- Arsenio Luz (1932), director-general of the Philippine Carnival, businessman, and representative of the Philippines at the 1931 Paris Colonial Exposition
- Luis Antonio G. Tagle, pro-prefect for the Section of First Evangelization, Dicastery for Evangelization
- Ramon S. Ang, chairman, San Miguel Corporation

Chevalier

- Pura Santillan-Castrence, writer and diplomat
- Romulo Espaldon, rear admiral and diplomat, named chevalier of the Légion d'honneur by decree of August 30, 1978 for his efforts in bringing peace to Southern Philippines and for his role in the rescue of abducted French diplomat Pierre Huguet
- Loren Legarda, Senator
- Max Soliven, journalist
- Roberto de Ocampo, former Secretary of Finance (1994–1998)

== Poland ==
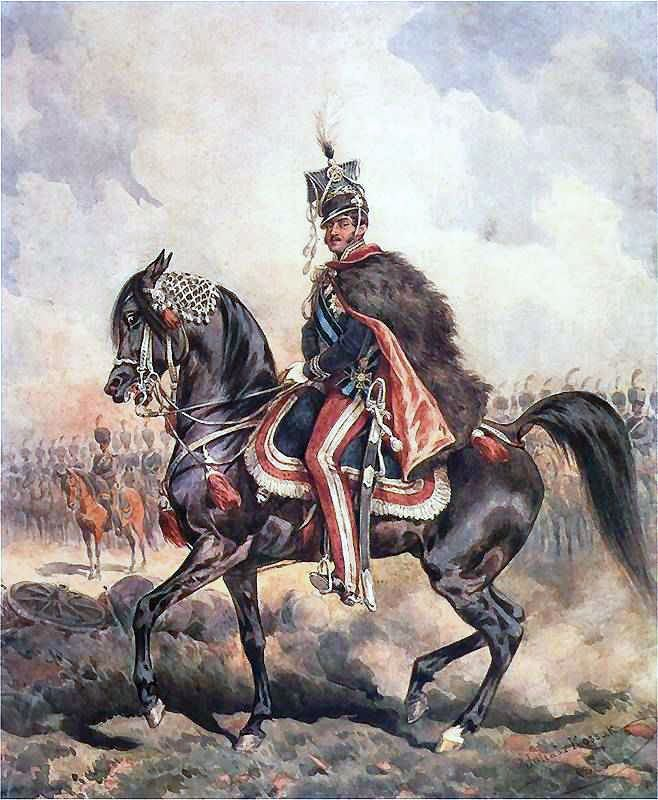
Painting of Józef Poniatowski on horse

More than 400 Poles have received the award. Some of the most notable recipients include:

- Roman Abraham, general
- Wladyslaw Anders, WWII general
- Józef Beck, Minister of Foreign Affairs
- Władysław Bartoszewski, politician
- Count Xavier Branicki, financier and patron of the arts, philanthropist
- Edward Gierek, politician
- Agenor Maria Gołuchowski, statesman
- Henryk Jabłoński, historian
- Bronisław Komorowski, President of Poland
- Aleksander Kwaśniewski, President of Poland
- Tomasz Lubienski, officer in Napoleon's army
- Tadeusz Mazowiecki, Prime Minister of Poland
- Aleksander Piotr Mohl, diplomat
- Ignacy Mościcki, President of Poland
- Ignacy Jan Paderewski, pianist and politician
- Józef Piłsudski, statesman, military leader
- Józef Poniatowski (Grand Croix, 1807) military general, Marshal of the Empire
- Radosław Sikorski, Minister of Foreign Affairs
- Władysław Sikorski, Prime Minister of Poland
- Andrzej Wajda, film director
- Lech Wałęsa (Grand Croix, 1991), President of Poland

== Portugal ==
- Francisco Manuel de Melo Breyner, 4th Count of Ficalho, Chevalier of the Légion d'Honneur
- António Cabreira, scholar, was awarded the Chevalier of the Légion d'Honneur by decree of 8 January 1903
- António Egas Moniz, Commandeur of the Légion d'Honneur
- Alberto Girard, Officier of the Légion d'Honneur
- Aníbal Milhais, Soldier in World War 1 was awarded the Chevalier of the Légion d'honneur on the battlefield
- José Saramago (Officier, 1999) writer
- Henrique Gouveia e Melo (Officier, 11 November 2024), Naval officer

== Qatar ==
- Abdullah bin Nasser Al Thani, 19 November 2009
- Jassim Saif Al Sulaiti, Qatari Minister of Transport

== Romania ==
Romanian royal family

- King Ferdinand I – Knight Grand Cross
- Queen Marie – Dame Grand Officer (1918)
- Maria, Queen Mother of Yugoslavia – Knight Grand Cross (1959)
- King Michael I – Knight Grand Cross (1944)
- Crown Princess Margareta – Knight (2009)

Kingdom of Romania

- General Constantin Prezan – Grand Officer (1917)

Republic of Romania

- President Nicolae Ceaușescu – Honorary Knight Grand Cross (revoked)
- Corneliu Coposu – Grand Officer (1995)

== Russia ==
- Pavel Akimovich Ovchinnikov (1867), Russian court jeweller
- Ivan Aivazovsky (Chevalier, 1857; Commandeur, 1887) painter. Awarded Chevalier de la Legion d'honneur for his work in Exposition Universelle
- Osip Komissarov, peasant-born hatter's apprentice, for saving Alexander II (1866)
- Theodor Avellan, admiral in Imperial Russian Navy (1893)
- Aleksey Lobanov-Rostovsky, minister of foreign affairs of the Russian Empire (1895)
- Lazar Brodsky, businessman and philanthropist (1900)
- L. L. Zamenhof, physician, creator of Esperanto (1905)
- Ivan Poddubny, professional wrestler (1911)
- Ivan Pavlov, experimental neurologist known for his discovery of Pavlovian conditioning (1915)
- Ilya Ehrenburg (Chevalier, 1945) revolutionary, writer, historian and journalist
- Rodion Malinovsky, a Soviet military commander in World War II and Defense Minister of the Soviet Union in the 1950s and 1960s (1945, Grand Officer)
- Maya Plisetskaya, ballerina (1986)
- Gury Marchuk, former president of USSR Academy of Sciences (1988).
- Nikita Mikhalkov, actor and director (Officer in 1992, Commander in 1994)
- Gennady Rozhdestvensky, conductor (2003)
- Lyudmila Alexeyeva, human rights activist (2007)
- Anatoly Perminov, rocket scientist (2010)
- Mikhail Prokhorov (Chevalier, 2011) businessman and politician
- Vladimir Spivakov, violinist and conductor (Chevalier in 2000, Officer in 2011)
- Mikhail Gromov, pilot, air forces commander
- Aleksandr Ivanchenkov, cosmonaut
- Irina Antonova, director of the Pushkin Museum
- Aleksandr Viktorenko, cosmonaut
- Yury Osipov, mathematician
- Yevgeniy Chazov, physician
- Zhores Alferov, physicist
- Mikhail Piotrovsky, director of the State Hermitage Museum
- Pavel Lungin, director
- Viatcheslav Moshe Kantor, Jewish leader, philanthropist and businessman
- Sergei Kovalev, human rights activist
- Vladimir Putin, president of the Russian Federation (2006)

== Saudi Arabia ==
- Prince Muhammad bin Nayef (2016)

== Senegal ==
- Abdoulaye Wade, former president of Senegal

== Serbia ==
- King Peter I, King of Serbia, was awarded Grand Cross and became the ruler of the new country: Kingdom of Serbs, Croats and Slovenes (later renamed Kingdom of Yugoslavia)
- Ivan Čolović (Chevalier, 2001) Serbian ethnologist, anthropologist, writer and publisher
- Veran Matić (2009) journalist and editor-in-chief of B92, "for the fight he has always led for independence and freedom of the media"
- Emir Kusturica (Chevalier, 2011), filmmaker
- Dragoljub Mićunović (Officier, 2013), politician, philosopher
- Olja Bećković (2014), journalist, actress and television presenter for "her exceptional professional path, courage, and fearlessness"
- Alexander, Crown Prince of Serbia (Commandeur, 2015), Crown Prince of Serbia, "for his contribution in democratization of Serbian society"
- Čedomilj Mijatović, ambassador, politician and academic
- Veselin Čajkanović, classical scholar, philosopher, ethnologist, religious history scholar, and Greek and Latin translator.
- Milan Kašanin, art historian and writer
- Pavle Savić, scientist and Nobel Prize candidate
- Milunka Savić
- Dragutin Gavrilović, military officer
- Živojin Mišić, field marshal
- Alexander I of Yugoslavia
- Predrag Koraksić Corax, political caricaturist
- Borka Pavićević, political and NGO activist
- Pavle Beljanski, lawyer and diplomat
- German, Serbian Patriarch
- Sonja Licht, NGO activist
- Aleksandar Tišma, writer
- Mira Trailović, dramaturg and one of the most distinguished theatre directors in the history of Serbian and Yugoslav theatre
- Svetlana Velmar-Janković, writer
- Ljubica Gojgić, journalist

== Singapore ==
- David Marshall (1978), first chief minister of Singapore, first Singaporean ambassador to France
- Tan Boon Teik (1998), former attorney-general of Singapore, was appointed an Officer for contributions towards increasing commercial ties between France and Singapore as co-chairman of the France–Singapore Business Council.
- Lim Kim Choon (2004), former Chief of the Republic of Singapore Air Force.
- Su Guaning (2005), president emeritus of Nanyang Technological University.
- Lam Khin Yong (2017), Acting Provost, Chief of Staff and Vice President (Research) of Nanyang Technological University, Singapore, appointed Knight
- Ng Eng Hen (2018), Minister of Defence of Singapore since 2011, appointed Officer
- Tan Chorh Chuan (2022), Chief Health Scientist, appointed Knight for outstanding contributions in health and science
- Leo Yee Sin (2022), executive director of the National Centre of Infectious Diseases, appointed Knight
- Laurient Rénia (2022), director of the Respiratory and Infectious Diseases Programme at the Lee Kong Chian School of Medicine at Nanyang Technological University, appointed Knight
- Tan Eng Chye (2022), president of the National University of Singapore, appointed Knight
- Ng Kok Song (2004), president hopeful, appointed Knight

== Slovakia ==
- Milan Rastislav Štefánik (1914) politician, diplomat, astronomer, Minister of War of Czechoslovakia. Awarded Legion of Honour for his scientific contributions.

== South Africa ==
- André Brink OIS (1982) novelist, essayist, poet, known for his contributions to Afrikaans literature
- Miriam Makeba (Commandeur, 2002), singer, songwriter, actress and civil rights activist
- Desmond Tutu (Grand Officier, 1998), bishop and human rights activist.

== South Korea ==
Grand Officer

- Yang Ho Cho, Chairman of Hanjin Group was awarded in 2015

Commander

- Lee Kun-Hee, Samsung chief executive officer was awarded in 2006.

Chevalier

- Myung-whun Chung, Conductor was awarded the honor in 1992
- Song Young-gil, South Korean Politician was the chairman of Parliamentary Friendship Group with the Republic of France from 2004 to 2008
- Kim Hong-nam, former director of the National Museum of Korea was awarded in 2008
- Chey Tae-won, group chairman of SK and Chairman of the Korean Chamber of Commerce and Industry, awarded in June 2022

== Spain ==
Grand-Croix

- Felipe VI of Spain
- Juan Carlos I of Spain
- Queen Sofía of Spain
- Salvador de Madariaga, diplomat, writer and historian
- Eduardo Propper de Callejón, diplomat in 1941

Grand Officer

- Carlos Ibáñez e Ibáñez de Ibero, marquis of Mulhacén, geodesist, first president of the International Committee for Weights and Measures for his contribution in dissemination of the metric system among all nations
- Imeldo Serís-Granier y Blanco in 1885
- Juan Antonio Samaranch, former president of the International Olympic Committee.

Commandeur

- Fernando Alejandre, Chief of the Defence Staff.
- Francisco Franco (Officier, 1928; Commandeur, 1930), military general and dictator
- Leonardo Torres Quevedo (Commandeur, 1922), civil engineer, mathematician and inventor.

Officer

- Julián Marías, philosopher, essayist and former Senator
- Paco Rabanne (2010), fashion designer

Chevalier

- Carlos Palanca Gutiérrez (1859)
- Isaac Albeniz (composer) (1909)
- Julio Iglesias (Chevalier, 2007) singer
- Miguel Induráin (Chevalier, 1993) cyclist
- Manuel Quiroga, violinist, composer and artist, appointed a Chevalier in 1931

== Sri Lanka ==
Commander

- Chandrika Kumaratunga

Officer

- Professor Mohan Munasinghe
- Professor Malik Peiris

== Sweden ==
Grand-Croix

- King Carl XVI Gustaf of Sweden, appointed with the Grand Cross
- Queen Silvia of Sweden
- Hjalmar Hammarskjöld
- Arvid Lindman
- Axel Rappe
- Knut Agathon Wallenberg

Grand Officier

- Carl August Ehrensvärd
- Bengt Nordenskiöld
- Pablo Casals (Grand Officier, 1946), cellist, composer and conductor

Commandeur

- Carl Bildt
- Fredrik Ramel
- Håkan Syrén

Officier

- Harald Cramér
- Birgitta Ohlsson, appointed 23 January 2017

Chevalier

- Max von Sydow
- Rikard Wolff
- Lars Levi Laestadius
- Gunilla Svantorp
- Annelie Johansson

== Switzerland ==
- Bruno Ganz (Chevalier, 2007), actor
- Charles Morerod (Chevalier, 2013), bishop of Lausanne, Geneva and Fribourg
- Elisabeth Eidenbenz (Chevalier, 2017) teacher, known for saving refugees from Nazi Germany and Francoist Spain during World War II.
- Eugene Burnand (Chevalier, 1892; Officier, 1920) painter and illustrator
- Pascal Couchepin (Officier, 2011) former president of the Swiss Confederation. Awarded Legion of Honour for promoting France-Switzerland relations
- Sepp Blatter (Chevalier, 2004), former president of FIFA

== Taiwan ==
- Ang Lee, February 2021.

== Thailand ==
Grand-Croix

- King Mongkut (1865)
- King Chulalongkorn (1909)
- Prince Bhanurangsi Savangwongse (1926)
- Prime Minister Pridi Banomyong (1939)
- King Bhumibol Adulyadej (1960)
- Field Marshal Sarit Thanarat (1961)
- Queen Sirikit (1960)
- King Vajiralongkorn (2026)

Grand Officer

- Second King Pinklao (1865)
- Prince Damrong Rajanubhab (Grand Officier, 1891) Thai prince, statesman, reformer, historian and intellectual.
- Princess Galyani Vadhana (2007)
- Princess Sirivannavari (2026)

== Turkey ==
- Leyla Alaton, businesswoman and art collector, member of the board of Alarko group of companies, appointed as Chévalier in 2014
- İhsan Doğramacı (1915–2010), paediatrician, entrepreneur, philanthropist, educationalist, and college administrator, Officier de la Legion d'Honneur (1977).
- Ara Güler (1928-2018), photojournalist, appointed Officier des Arts et des Lettres in 2000
- Yaşar Kemal (1923–2015), writer, human rights activist (Commandeur, 1984; Grand Officier, 2011)

== Ukraine ==
- Oleg Sentsov (2023) cinematographer, film director
- Volodymyr Zelenskyy (2023)
- Oksana Zabuzhko (2023) writer, literaturer
- Lina Kostenko (2022) poet, literaturer
- Andrii Goncharuk (2010) diplomat

== United Arab Emirates ==
- Abdulaziz Nasser Al Shamsi (1999), Emirati ambassador to France from 1995 to 1999.
- Princess Haya bint Al Hussein (2014)

== United Kingdom ==
The Légion d'Honneur was awarded to 746 members of the British Armed Forces during the Crimean War, 1854–1856.

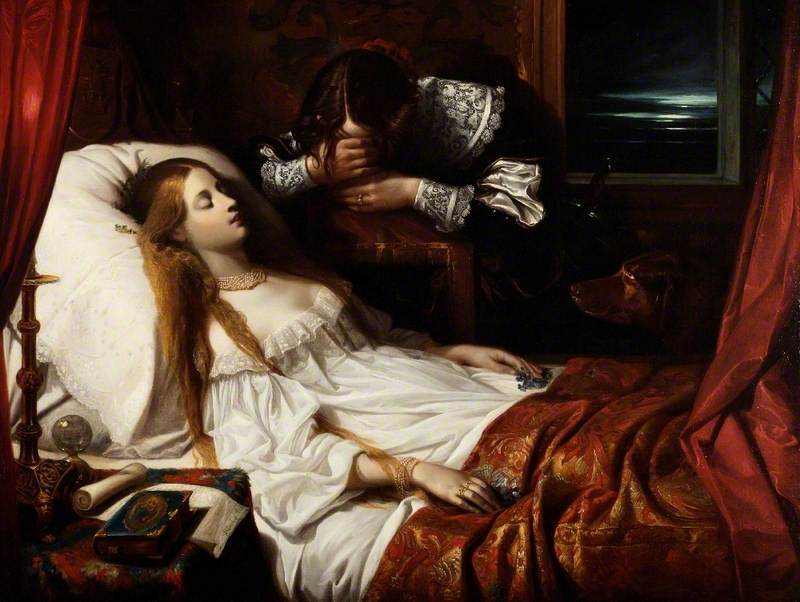
The Bride of Death by Thomas Jones Barker, commissioned by Louis Philippe I in 1839 for his daughter, Princess Marie; now in the Victoria Art Gallery.

A–C

- Henry Allingham (2003, 2009), the world's oldest man at his death and the second oldest war veteran of all time; appointed Chevalier in 2003 and promoted to Officier in 2009
- Edward Victor Appleton (Officier), physicist, known for his work on the ionosphere
- Vera Atkins CBE (Commandeur, 1987), Special Operations Executive agent
- Lionel Barber, Chevalier de la Légion d'honneur, for European journalism
- Thomas Jones Barker (awarded c. 1839), painter to Louis Philippe I
- Norman Bartlett, (Chevalier de la Légion d'honneur, 2025), Royal Navy, D-Day veteran
- Beecham, Sir Thomas, Commandeur, awarded 1937 for services to French music
- Captain Ralph Beauclerk, later Marqués de Valero de Urría, Chevalier de la Légion d'honneur (1945)
- Lowthian Bell FRS (Officier, 1878) ironmaster and politician. Awarded Legion of Honour for his services as Juror at the Centennial Exposition
- General Sir Henry Bentinck, Commandeur de la Légion d'honneur
- Lt-Cdr Richard Bevan (1919), for services during the Gallipoli Campaign
- Thomas A Bird, DSO, MC & Bar (2004), for leading a Rifle Brigade relief column through enemy lines into the desert citadel of Bir Hakeim, which enabled the 1st Free French Brigade to break out of the German encirclement on the night on 10/11 June 1942.
- Sir Robert Bird, 2nd Baronet (Chevalier, 1947) politician
- Thomas Brassey, civil engineer
- Jeremy Brett(1933-1995), Actor, he received the Légion d'honneur in 1994 for his portrayal of Sherlock Holmes in the series broadcast by ITV. A ceremony was held for this purpose at Manchester, where the episodes were filmed, honouring the tenth and final year of Brett bringing Holmes to life as well. The ceremony was recorded by the Sherlock Holmes Society of France. Moreover, as mentioned in Sir Arthur Conan Doyle's short story "The Adventure of the Golden Pince-Nez", the character himself is a Chevalier de la Légion d'honneur, having been awarded by the president of France for capturing an assassin.Sherlock Holmes#cite note-39
- Annie Brewer was awarded the Legion d'honneur for service as a nurse with the French Red Cross in WW1
- Alan Burns, 4th Baron Inverclyde, Commandeur de la Légion d'honneur
- Don Butt, Chevalier de la Légion d'honneur (2025)
- George Callaghan (1918), Admiral of the Fleet, appointed a Grand Officier of the Order
- Edward Cavendish, 10th Duke of Devonshire, Chevalier de la Légion d'honneur
- George Lenthal Cheatle, Chevalier de la Légion d'honneur (1935)
- The 1st Marquess of Cholmondeley, Chevalier de la Légion d'honneur
- Sir Winston Churchill, Grand-Croix de la Légion d’honneur 1958. Prime Minister of Great Britain 1940-45, 1951-55. Honoured for his extraordinary leadership and defence of Europe during WWII.
- Sean Connery (Chevalier, 1987) actor
- Cyril Connolly (Chevalier) literary critic and writer
- Sir John Henry Corke, Chevalier de la Légion d'honneur for his war work during World War I
- Yvonne Cormeau MBE CdeG, SOE agent
- Major Benjamin Cowburn, MC (and Bar), Croix de Guerre, appointed Chevalier de la Légion d'honneur
- Thomas Russell Crampton (Officier) engineer, known for laying the first submarine electric telegraph cable and inventing Crampton locomotive
- Bill Cross (2015), British Army soldier who fought in Normandy in the days after D-Day

D–J

- John Edward Davis British Army (1998), appointed Chevalier for service during the First World War alongside other remaining survivors including Harry Patch, was one of the last surviving combatants and the last Kitchener Volunteer to die.
- Peter Dillon (Chevalier, 1829), explorer. Awarded Legion of Honour for discovering the fate of the La Pérouse expedition
- Maurice Edelman MP, promoted Officier of the Légion d'honneur in 1960, having been appointed Chevalier in 1954
- Lieutenant Colonel (Temp. Brigadier General) William Rushbrooke Eden, appointed Officier in 1917 for services on the Macedonian Front.
- Major-General Sir David Egerton, Chevalier de la Légion d'honneur (1945);
- T. S. Eliot (Officier) poet, essayist, playwright
- Noble Frankland (2016), appointed Chevalier de la Légion d'honneur for his role in flying 27 sorties with 50 Squadron Bomber Command in support of the liberation of France, including two on D-Day
- Ernest Gambart, art dealer and publisher, appointed Officier de la Légion d'honneu (1894)
- Henry Fynes Clinton, Officier de la Légion d'honneur;
- Field Marshal Herbert Kitchener KG KP GCB OM GCSI GCMG GCIE PC (Grand Cross, 1902), awarded with the Grand Croix de la Légion d'honneur
- Sir John Gielgud, OM, CH (Chevalier Knight, 1960)
- Alfred Goddard, 6th Airborne Armoured Recce Regiment, awarded Legion d’honneur (Chevalier rank), for his in involvement in the liberation of France during the second world war, specifically for his part in the D-Day landings in June 1944.
- Douglas Gordon, appointed Commandeur de la Légion d'honneur;
- Graham Greene OM CH (Chevalier, 1967), appointed Chevalier de la Légion d'honneur
- Nubar Gulbenkian (Commandeur), businessman and socialite
- Sir Douglas Haig, appointed Grand Officier in May 1915 and Grand Croix in February 1916
- J. B. S. Haldane FRS (1937), scientist. Awarded Chevalier de la Légion d'honneur for his "scientific services to France".
- Sir Amos Hirst (1953), chairman of the Football Association (FA), awarded to celebrate the FA's 90th Anniversary
- William Jackson Hooker KH FRS FRSE FLS DCL (1855), botanist. Awarded Chevalier de la Légion d'honneur for "services rendered to natural sciences".
- Lieutenant Colonel Ewart Horsfall, Chevalier for activity in Royal Flying Corps in 1916, businessman and Olympic rower
- Major-General Sir James Murray Irwin (officier, 1920) high-ranking military doctor during World War I
- Sir Elton John (2019), was made Chevalier de la Légion d'honneur by French president Emmanuel Macron
- Sir Gladwyn Jebb (1957), 1st Baron Gladwyn, Grand Croix de la Légion d'honneur
- J. P. Knight (1878) railway engineer, inventor of traffic light

K–P

- Nasser David Khalili awarded the rank of Officier in the Légion d'honneur by President Francois Hollande for his work in the pursuit of peace, education and culture among nations
- Roger Landes CDeG MC (Officier, 1992), SOE agent. Awarded Legion of Honour for his war services.
- John Langdon, Commander of the National Order of the Légion d'honneur, Royal Marine officer at D-Day, later became an Anglican priest
- Sir Edward Leigh MP, appointed Officier de la Légion d'honneur in 2015;
- Joseph Locke FRSA (Officier) civil engineer
- Major Gerald Loxley AFC RAF, appointed Chevalier de la Légion d'honneur in 1919
- Darnton Lupton, Mayor of Leeds 1844
- Lieutenant Colonel Robert "Paddy" Blair Mayne, Northern Irish British Army officer, and founding member of the SAS.
- Sir Paul McCartney MBE (Officier, 2012), singer, songwriter, musician, former member of the Beatles
- Admiral Francis Mitchell, in recognition of military service during WWI
- Nancy Mitford (Chevalier 1972) for her contribution to French literature and historical biography
- Eric Peter Molyneux, appointed Chevalier de la Légion d'honneur in 2021, in recognition of service during Normandy landings
- Lord Monks (2014), former General-Secretary of the Trades Union Congress 1993–2003, Secretary-General of the European Trade Union Confederation 2003–2011
- Field Marshal Bernard Law Montgomery, 1st Viscount Montgomery of Alamein KG GCB DSO PC DL (Grand Croix, 1945), British Army officer
- Colonel Sir Thomas Andrew Alexander Montgomery-Cuninghame, 10th Baronet, awarded the Légion d'honneur in 1919 by the president of the French Republic
- Christopher Nevinson, artist, awarded Chevalier of the Légion d'honneur in 1938
- Chris Norman (2015), for subduing the gunman of the 2015 Thalys train attack
- Harry Patch (1998, 2009), Britain's last surviving First World War Veteran, appointed Chevalier 1998 and promoted Officier in 2009

Q–V

- Jim Radford, appointed Chevalier of the Légion d'honneur in October 2015 "in recognition of his steadfast involvement in the Liberation of France during the Second World War"
- Richard Redmayne KCB MICE MIMM FGS (Chevalier, 1918), civil engineer.
- Paul Richey, Chevalier de la Légion d'honneur in 1980;
- Michael Rose KCB CBE DSO QGM (1995), British Army officer. Awarded Commandeur de la Légion d'honneur for commanding United Nations Protection Force in Bosnia.
- J. K. Rowling (Chevalier, 2009), author and philanthropist
- Dame Kristin Scott Thomas, Chevalier de la Légion d'honneur;
- Sydney Vincent Sippe (1914), pilot, raid on German Zeppelin factory in November 1914
- Lord Slynn of Hadley GBE GCStJ, Chevalier de la Légion d'honneur;
- The 12th Duke of St Albans, Chevalier de la Légion d'honneur;
- Vice-Admiral Sir Victor Stanley, Chevalier de la Légion d'honneur;
- Keir Starmer, Grand Officier de la Légion d'honneur (2026)
- Llewelyn Robert Owen Storey, physicist, Chevalier de la Légion d'honneur (1966);
- James H. Sutherland, appointed Chevalier of the Légion d'honneur, for conspicuously good service as Special Guide to the Nyasaland Field Force.
- Sir John Sulston, (2004) Officier de la Legion d'honneur;
- Joseph Swan FRS (Chevalier, 1881), physicist and inventor, known for developing incandescent bulb and dry photographic plate
- Susan Travers (1996); Served in the French Red Cross as a nurse and ambulance driver during Second World War. She later became the only woman to officially join the French Foreign Legion, and served in Vietnam, during the First Indochina War.
- Violet Trefusis (1950), writer and socialite, appointed Chevalier de la Légion d'honneur;
- Ninette de Valois (1950), appointed Chevalier of the Légion d'honneur
- Lise Villemeur MBE CdeG, SOE agent

W–Z

- Air Chief Marshal Sir Augustus Walker, WWII pilot and former Inspector-General of the RAF
- Sir Herbert Ashcombe Walker, General Manager of the London and South Western Railway, appointed a Grand Officier of the Légion d'honneur
- Arthur Wallis-Myers (Chevalier, 1932), English tennis correspondent, editor, author and player.
- Herbert Ward (Chevalier, 1911) sculptor
- Betty Webb, Bletchley Park code breaker during WWII, appointed Chevalier of the Légion d'honneur.
- The 8th Duke of Wellington KG, Officier de la Légion d'honneur
- Rebecca West (Chevalier, 1957) author, journalist, literary critic and travel writer
- Robert Whitehead (1884) engineer, known for developing the first self-propelled torpedo
- Sir Frank Williams, founder of the Williams F1 Team, appointed Chevalier of the Légion d'honneur
- Wing Commander Forest Frederick Edward Yeo-Thomas (Commandeur), SOE agent

== United States ==
=== Individuals ===
The individuals listed below are among the approximately 10,000 Americans who have been so honored:

A–B

- Virginia d'Albert-Lake (Chevalier, 1989), member of French Resistance during World War II. Awarded Legion of Honour for her war services.
- John White Alexander (Chevalier, 1901), artist and muralist
- Edwin Armstrong (1919), electrical engineer and inventor. Awarded Chevalier de la Légion d'honneur for co-inventing superheterodyne receiver.

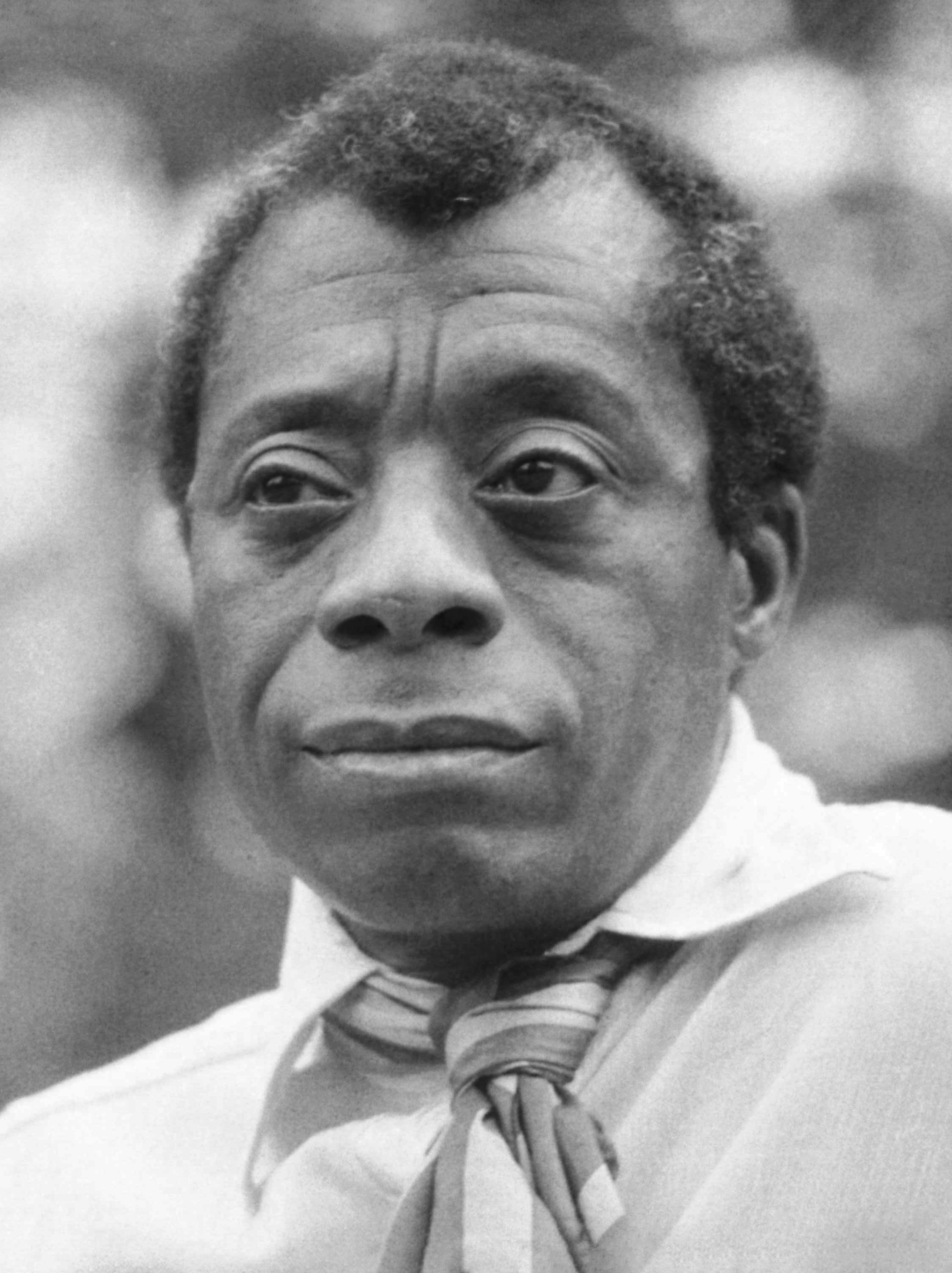
James Baldwin

- Frank Lusk Babbott, philanthropist
- Josephine Baker, an entertainer, activist, and French Resistance agent
- James Baldwin (Commandeur, 1986), writer and civil rights activist
- John William Barker (1920), U.S. Army brigadier general
- Paul Wayland Bartlett (1924) sculptor
- David Belasco (Chevalier, 1924), theatrical producer, impresario, director and playwright. Awarded Legion of Honour for his "distinguished services to the cause of art".
- Alexander Graham Bell (1847) inventor of the telephone
- Sosthenes Behn (Chevalier) businessman, founder of ITT and co-founder of Claro Puerto Rico
- Marc Benioff (Chevalier, 2022), co-founder, chairman and CEO of Salesforce
- Leonard Bernstein (Commandeur, 1986) conductor and composer
- Ramón Emeterio Betances (Chevalier, 1887) independence advocate, physician and diplomat. Awarded Legion of Honour for his contributions to medical research.
- Jeff Bezos (2023), founder of Amazon
- Susan Blumenthal (Chevalier, 2025), Rear Admiral (ret), U.S. Asst. Surgeon General, physician, Ambassador, Institut Curie. Awarded Legion of Honor for her pioneering contributions in women’s health, global health, and the fight against cancer.
- Kathryne Bomberger, director-general of the International Commission on Missing Persons (ICMP)
- Arnaud de Borchgrave (Chevalier, 2014), journalist specializing in international politics and former editor in chief of The Washington Times.
- Joseph Brodsky (1991), poet and essayist
- Arlester Brown (2024), U.S. Army soldier, D-Day veteran
- John Nicholas Brown Philanthropist
- Eugene Bullard (1959) First African-American military pilot, Lafayette Flying Corps WWI
- Benjamin Crowninshield Bradlee (2007), received it for being the Press Attache of News Week in Paris.
- Charles H. Burke (1932) Congressman, Commissioner of the Bureau of Indian Affairs, and representative of the U.S. mainland for the 1931 Paris Colonial Exposition
- Rear Admiral Richard E. Byrd (Chevalier 1926), (Commandeur 1929) Leader of the first flights over the North Pole and South Pole

C–D

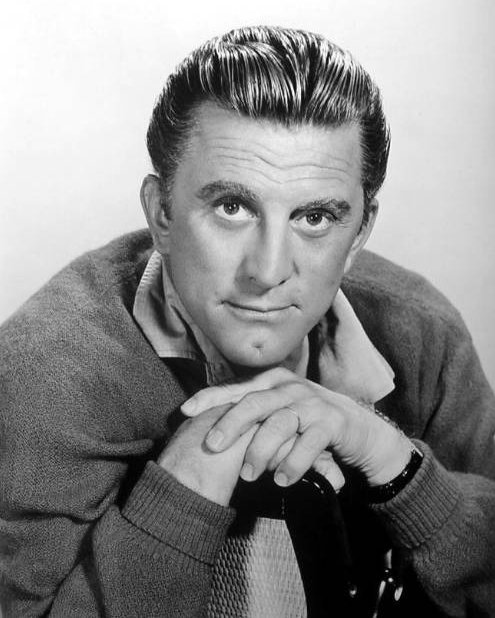
Kirk Douglas

- Alexander Calder (Commandeur, 1974), sculptor
- Julia Child (November 2000)
- Steven Clemons, Chevalier (October 2021) journalist, editor, foreign policy expert for his contributions in the field of foreign affairs and international diplomacy.
- Rita R. Colwell (Chevalier, 2017), microbiologist, former director of National Science Foundation
- Francis Ford Coppola (Officier, 2007) film director
- Bette Davis film actress.
- Miles Davis jazz musician
- Marlene Dietrich German-born actress and singer, for her work improving morale on the front lines of WWII
- Walt Disney (8 Jan 1936) cartoon animator and producer.
- Donald Wills Douglas Jr. industrialist, for his contributions to aviation
- Kirk Douglas (1985) actor
- Charles Durning, European Theater of World War II, also, US Silver Star, US Bronze Star Medal with Valor Device, 3 US Purple Hearts
- Bob Dylan (2013) musician, singer-songwriter, artist, and writer

E

- Clint Eastwood (2009) actor, film director, film producer and composer
- Thomas Edison (Chevalier, 1878; Officier, 1882; Commandeur, 1889) Inventor and businessman.
- Dwight D. Eisenhower, Grand-Croix (1943) five-star general in the United States Army, 34th president of the United States, Supreme Commander of the Allied forces in Europe during World War II, and the supreme commander of NATO
- Charles William Eliot (1903, Officer and 1924, Commander), longest-serving president of Harvard University, transformed it into the research powerhouse that it is known as today.
- Muriel Engelman (Chevalier, 2018), second lieutenant, U.S. Army Nurse Corps in World War II, spending several months of her two-year service near the front lines at the Ardennes (Battle of the Bulge) treating American and Allied soldiers.
- Steven Erlanger (Chevalier, 2016), journalist.

F

- Samuel Morse Felton Jr. railroad executive who was in charge of organization and dispatch to France of all American railway forces and supplies for the Western Front of World War I.
- Mayhew Foster (2009) World War II soldier who flew Hermann Göring from Austria to Germany, where Göring stood trial for war crimes at Nuremberg
- Simon Flexner, Commandeur (1923), Physician, administrator and professor of experimental pathology.
- Varian Fry (Chevalier, 1967), operated a refugee network from Marseille which helped over 2,000 people escape the Holocaust in 1940–41.

G

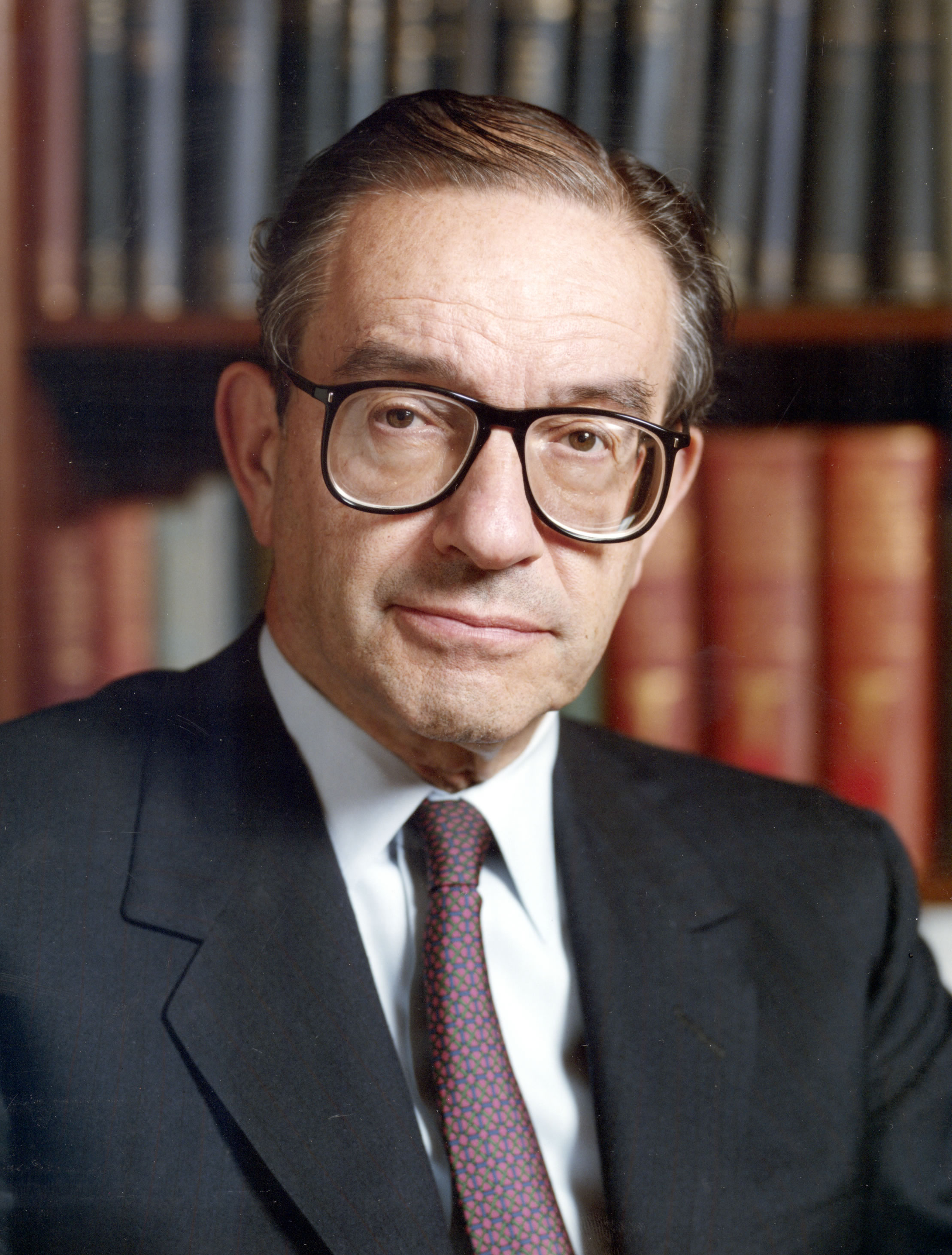
Alan Greenspan

- John Kenneth Galbraith (Commandeur, 1986) economist and diplomat
- Jeanne Gang (2015), architect
- Ralph Gibson, photographer, appointed Knight of the Order of the Legion of Honor (2018).
- Grace Gassette, artist who designed orthopedic devices for wounded soldiers in World War I
- Rick Goings, Chairman Emeritus Tupperware Brands, for his dedication to the role of women and children in developing countries (2010)
- Charles Goodyear (1855) chemist and manufacturing engineer, known for inventing vulcanized rubber
- Bart Gordon, Officer (2012), US representative from Tennessee
- Susan Graham, Chevalier, Mezzo-soprano
- Maurice R. "Hank" Greenberg (2014), business executive, for military service in the European Theater during World War II
- Alan Greenspan, economist and Chairman of the US Federal Reserve
- William Remsburg Grove (Officer 1919), US Army, Quartermaster Corps, for World War I service.

H

- Philip Habib, Under Secretary of State for Political Affairs, special envoy to the Middle East
- Pamela Harriman (Grand Croix, 1997), former United States Ambassador to France.
- Harry B. Harris Jr. (2018) Commander, U.S. Pacific Command and designated U.S. Ambassador to the Republic of Korea
- Michael Heidelberger (Chevalier, 1966), immunologist known for discovering the proteinaceous nature of antibodies.
- John Philip Hogan (Chevalier, 1919), lieutenant colonel (US Army) for World War I service
- Stuart Holliday (2022), United States Ambassador for Special Political Affairs at the United Nations (2003-2005)
- Thomas E. Horn (2021), Honorary Consul of Monaco in San Francisco
- Elias Howe (1867), inventor of the sewing machine
- Robert E. Hunter, US Ambassador to NATO

I

- Daniel Inouye (2007), US senator from Hawaii. US Army captain with the 442nd RCT during World War II

J

- Charles Thomas Jackson physician and scientist who was active in medicine, chemistry, mineralogy, and geology.
- Jesse Jackson (2021) civil rights leader
- Quincy Jones (2001), record producer and musician
- Ira Joralemon (1918), geologist and mining engineer, served on Billy Mitchell's staff in the United States Army Air Service during World War I

K

- Otto Kahn, German-born, patron of the arts
- Bentley Kassal World War II Veteran.
- Philip Kearny, was the first American recipient for his service during the Battle of Solferino.
- Helen Keller (Chevalier), author, disability rights advocate, political activist and lecturer
- Thomas Keller, American chef
- Gene Kelly (Chevalier, 1960) dancer, actor, director and choreographer. Awarded Legion of Honour for developing Pas de Dieux for the Paris Opera Ballet.
- Arthur E. Kennelly (Chevalier, 1922) electrical engineer
- Jeong H. Kim (2013), president of Bell Labs (2005–2013), in recognition of his exceptional accomplishments and exemplary commitment to French-American friendship
- Young-Oak Kim, Officier (2005), US Army Colonel; Battalion Operation Officer of the 100th bn/442nd RCT during the campaigns for Bruyères and Biffontaine
- Jacques Paul Klein, Under-Secretary-General of the United Nations
- Blanche Knopf Officier (1960), publisher, in recognition of her work publishing French literature
- William A. Knowlton, US Army general
- C. Everett Koop (1980), Surgeon General of the United States
- Lawrence D. Kritzman (2012) John D. Willard Professor of French, Comparative Literature, and Oratory Dartmouth

L

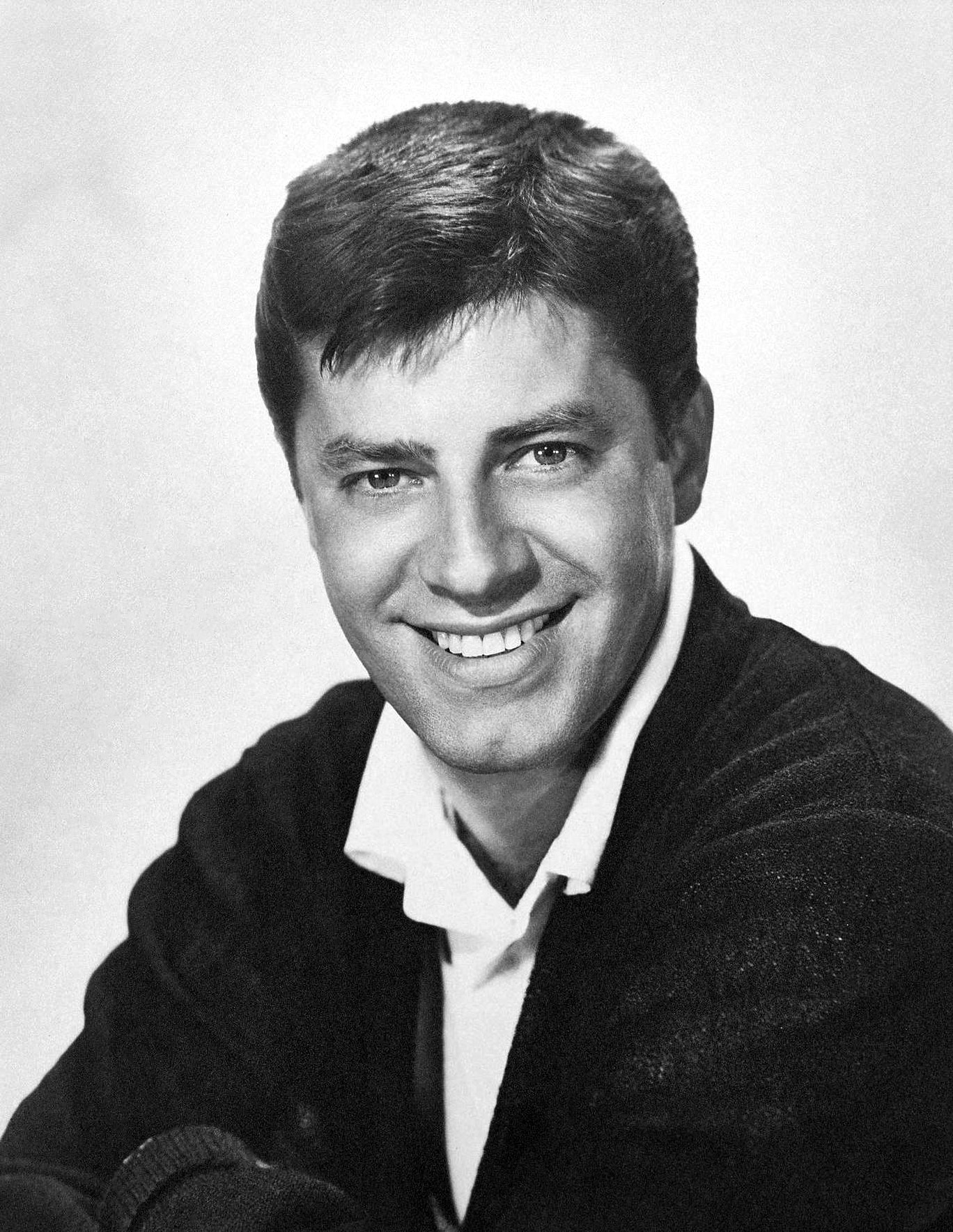
Jerry Lewis

- Karl Landsteiner ForMemRS (Chevalier, 1911), immunologist known for discovering ABO blood types, Rh factor and poliovirus.
- Ralph Lauren (Chevalier, 2010), fashion designer, founder of Ralph Lauren
- Henry Louis Larsen, commander of the 3rd Battalion 5th Marines during World War I and later Governor of Guam
- John Leahy, Chief Sales Officer at Airbus was named an Officer of the Order in March 2012
- John C. H. Lee, Lieutenant General, U.S Army, Commanding General Com-Z and Army Service Forces, European Theater
- John A. Lejeune, Lieutenant General, U.S. Marine Corps, Commander of 4th Marine Brigade, then U.S. Army 2nd Infantry Division during World War I
- Lyman Lemnitzer, US Army General, Supreme Allied Commander for Europe.
- Salmon O. Levinson (Chevalier, 1934) attorney, known for drafting the Kellogg-Briand Pact
- Jerry Lewis (1984) Commandeur (2006)
- A. J. Liebling (Chevalier, 1952) journalist. Awarded Legion of Honor for his war reporting during World War II
- Charles Lindbergh, aviator
- Henry Cabot Lodge Jr., diplomat and politician
- David Lynch, filmmaker
- Alexander Lyons (Chevalier, 1919), rabbi

M

- Douglas MacArthur, Grand-Croix. General, Chief of Staff of the United States Army, and field marshal of the Philippine Army
- John F. Madden, (Officier, 1919), U.S. Army brigadier general
- Donald Malarkey (2009) U.S. Army, Easy Company, 2nd Battalion, 506th Parachute Infantry Regiment, 101st Airborne Division, U.S. Army
- Paul Bernard Malone, U.S. Army general
- Mary Margaretta Fryer Manning (1900), president-general of the Daughters of the American Revolution and U.S. Commissioner to the Exposition Universelle.
- Wynton Marsalis (2009), (US), trumpeter and composer
- George C. Marshall, Grand-Croix. General Chief of Staff of the United States Army. US Secretary of State, and Secretary of Defense.
- Knox Martin, painter, sculptor and muralist, Chevalier (2016), for his contribution to the liberation of France during World War II.
- Hiram Maxim (Chevalier, 1878) inventor, known for creating Maxim gun. Awarded Legion of Honour for developing an electric pressure regulator.
- Paul Goodloe McIntire, investor and philanthropist, for founding a tuberculosis hospital in France.
- Luke McNamee, Admiral, 10th and 12th Naval Governor of Guam, head of the Battle Fleet, and 21st Director of the Office of Naval Intelligence
- William A. McNulty, Chevalier (1945), colonel (US Army), WWII field commander
- Robert Andrews Millikan (Commandeur, 1936), Experimental physicist.
- Liza Minnelli (Chevalier, 1987; Officier, 2011) actress, singer and dancer
- Maurice Meyers (2010), U.S. Army, Third Infantry Division, Seventh Army. Awarded for his heroic actions at the Colmar Pocket and at the crossing of the Rhine River, during WWII.
- Vincente Minnelli (Commandeur, 1986) director
- Billy Mitchell, Commandeur. United States Army Air Service Brigadier General.
- Anne Morgan (Officier, 1924; Commandeur, 1932) philanthropist. Awarded Legion of Honor for providing relief aid to France during World War I.
- Toni Morrison (2010) novelist
- Samuel Morse (Chevalier, 1856) inventor and painter, known for co-developing the Morse code
- Michael Mullen (2007) 17th chairman of the Joint Chiefs of Staff
- Audie Murphy, the most decorated US soldier of World War II
- James Mynatt (2017) Army Air Corps, 848th Bomb Squadron, 490th Bombardment Group, ultimately flew 35 missions, his first piloting a B-24 bomber over Normandy on D-Day

N

- Joseph Napolitan (2005), political consultant
- Simon Newcomb (Officier, 1896), astronomer and mathematician
- Chester W. Nimitz, Grand-Croix. US Navy Fleet Admiral – Commander of the U.S. Pacific Fleet during World War II.
- Robert de Niro (Chevalier, 1997), actor

O–Q

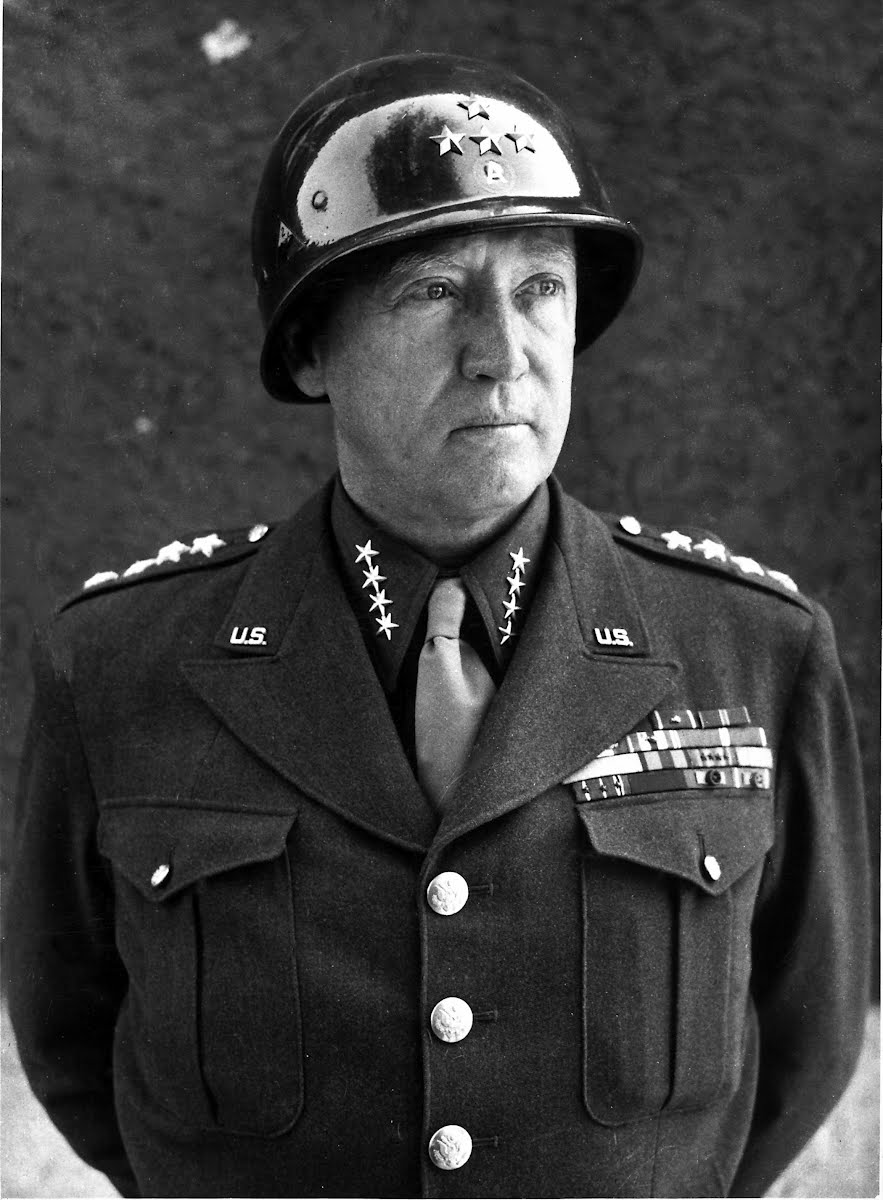
George S Patton

- Robert O'Brien (2022) former National Security Advisor, helped free two French hostages
- Edwin B. Parker, member of the War Industries Board and arbiter with Germany, Austria and Hungary following World War I
- Robert Parker Officier (2005), wine critic
- Mason Patrick, major general, US Army, and Chief of US Army Air Corps
- George S. Patton, Commandeur. US Army general
- Gregory Peck (Commandeur, 1995) actor
- Ernest Peixotto, captain/artist, US Army Corps of Engineers – WWI (presented 1921 Chevalier raised to Officer 1926)
- Claiborne Pell (1960) United States senator
- Paul Pennoyer Sr., Colonel, lawyer, diplomat and member of the Morgan family.
- Lafayette G. Pool, S/Sgt, US Army 3rd Armored Division, US tank ace credited with over 1,000 kills, 250 German prisoners of war taken, 12 confirmed tank kills and 258 total armored vehicle and self-propelled gun kills
- Colin Powell, US Secretary of State, US Army General
- William Wilson Quinn, US Army Lieutenant general. responsible for the U.S. 7th Army's capture of Hermann Göring, Assistant Chief of Staff of the CIA

R

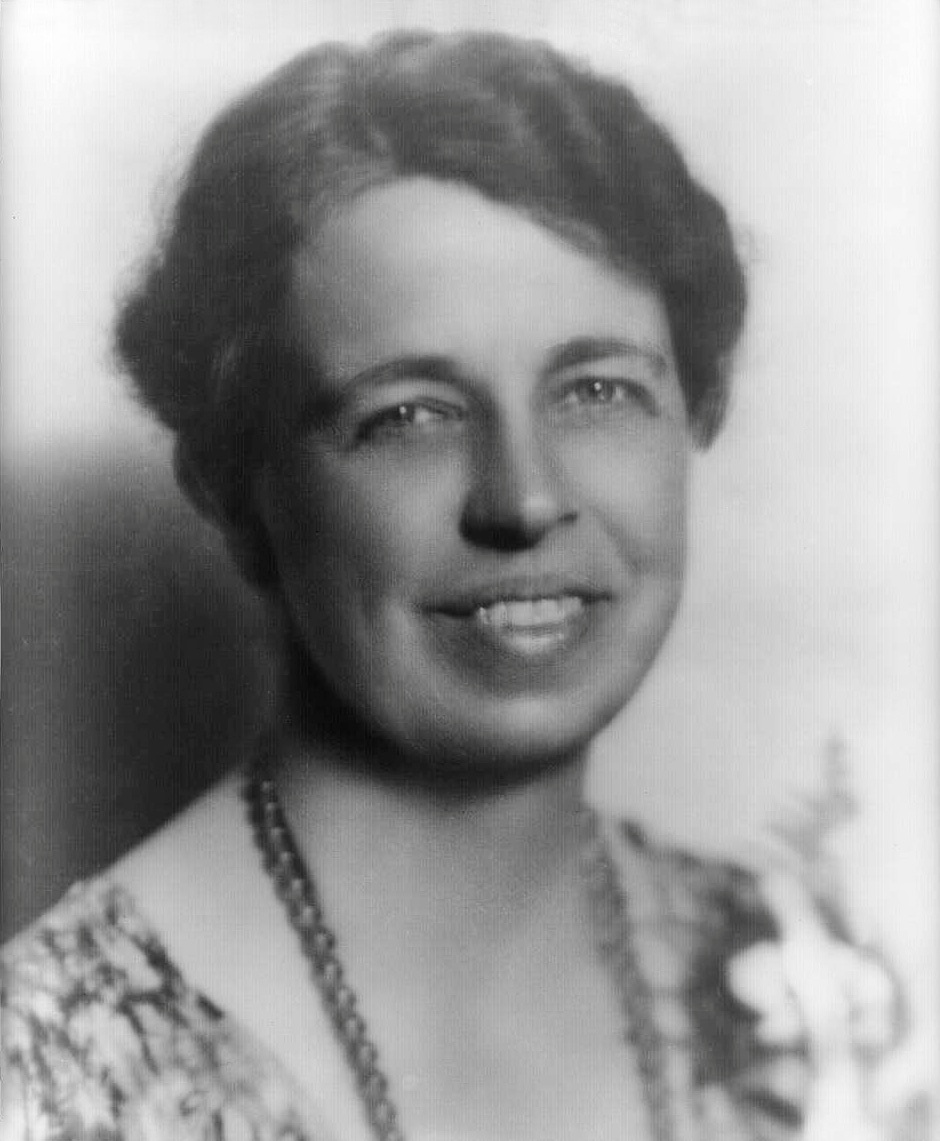
Eleanor Roosevelt

- Albert B. Randall Chevalier (1918). Commodore of the United States Lines for his part in bringing convoys of troop transports to France during WWI.
- Robert Redford (2010) actor
- Raj Reddy (1984) for his work on artificial intelligence and computer literacy
- Alexander H. Rice Jr., Commandeur. Doctor, for his medical services in France during World War I
- C. Allen Thorndike Rice (1879) for Charnay Expedition to explore and photograph Mayan ruins in Mexico and Guatemala
- Charles Rivkin, Commandeur (2013). Current U.S. Assistant Secretary of State for Economic and Business Affairs and former U.S. Ambassador to France
- John J. Roach (2017), a United States Army forward artillery observer during World War II
- Paul Craig Roberts, former U.S. assistant secretary for economic policy
- Rufus Roger Roberts, for his services during World War II
- Lowell Ward Rooks, American army officer
- Eleanor Roosevelt (1951), Commandeur
- Philip Roth (Commandeur, 2013) novelist, short story writer

S

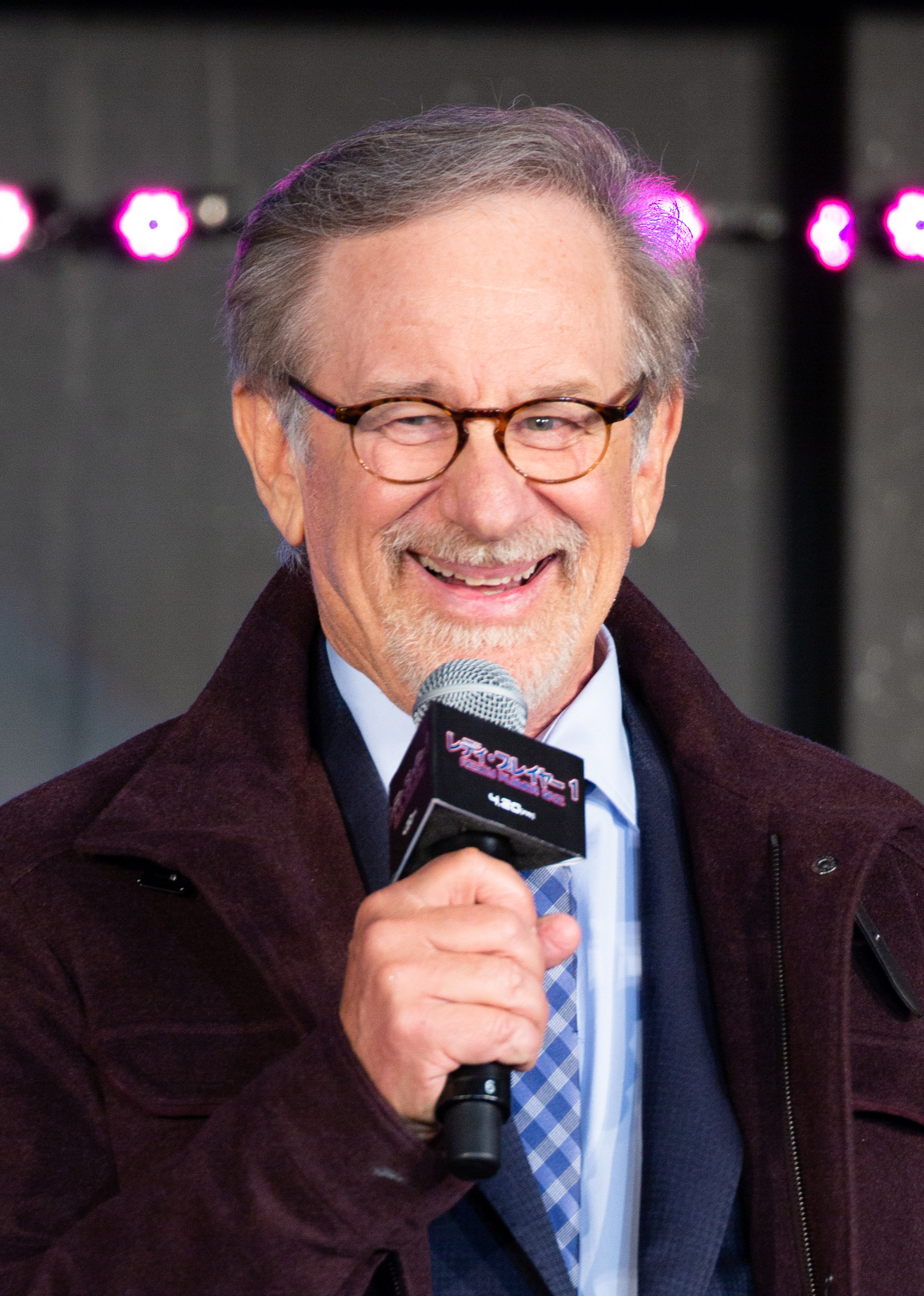
Steven Spielberg

- Raymond Sackler (1989) Officier (2013). MD, physician, entrepreneur, philanthropist.
- Anthony Sadler (2015) for subduing the gunman of the 2015 Thalys train attack
- Charles E. de M. Sajous, pioneer of endocrinology who studied in Paris
- J. D. Salinger, author. Awarded legion of Honour for his war service
- Pierre Salinger (1978), journalist and former United States senator
- David Sarnoff (Chevalier, 1935; Officier, 1940; Commandeur, 1947) businessman, known for pioneering commercial development of radio and television
- Charles Schepens ophthalmologist and member of the French Resistance
- Raymond F. Schinazi (2018) professor, researcher, entrepreneur, philanthropist, and a world-renowned leader in the field of nucleoside chemistry and antiviral drug research awarded for his pioneering work on HIV, hepatitis B and hepatitis C.
- Arnold Schwarzenegger (2011) bodybuilder, actor, businessman, politician
- Martin Scorsese (2005) film director and advocate of film preservation
- Igor Sigorsky (Chevalier, 1960) aviator, known for developing the first successful mass-produced helicopter.
- Ruth Simmons (2013) for "a career dedicated to being a visionary leader in academia"
- Franklin Simon, co-founder of Franklin Simon & Co., for doing more than anyone to put American women in French clothing
- Alek Skarlatos (2015) for subduing the gunman of the 2015 Thalys train attack
- Belle Skinner (1921) businesswoman and philanthropist, for her role in reconstruction after the First World War
- Anne-Marie Slaughter (2021) US legal scholar and social scientist, university executive, government official, public intellectual, and civil society leader
- Campbell Bascom Slemp (1932) Virginian congressman and commissioner general of the United States to the 1931 Paris Colonial Exposition
- Elissa Slotkin (2023) politician and national security official, awarded "in recognition of her role as Assistant Secretary of Defense for International Security Affairs under the Obama administration"
- Patti Smith Poet/Author/Musician.
- Steven Spielberg (Chevalier, 2004; Officier, 2008) film director/producer
- Spencer Stone (2015) for subduing the gunman of the 2015 Thalys train attack
- Col. William Howard Stovall DC/S, USSTAFE, WWII, awards ceremony for 2nd Air Division, May 1945.
- Barbra Streisand singer, actress, songwriter, and director
- Sully Sullenberger Officier (2011) US Airways Pilot who successfully landed on the Hudson River, preserving the lives of all 155 individuals on board
- Bruce Sundlun (1977) Governor of Rhode Island. Recognized for his work with the French Resistance during World War II

T

- Frank Tangherlini, (2026), Theoretical Physicist, U.S. Army Infantryman WW II, 506th PIR, 101st Airborne Div., Battle of the Bulge, Siege of Bastogne, and Battle of Alsace veteran (awarded at 102 years of age).
- Henry Ossawa Tanner (1923), U.S. born, French-based artist who worked with the [American Red Cross] and the French government during World War I
- David W. Taylor, US Navy rear admiral
- John Thomas Taylor (1937), Army veteran of World War I (and later World War II) who was a lobbyist for the American Legion
- Joe Thompson (2012) Army veteran, for World War II combat service in France.
- Max Thorek (1935), surgeon and humanitarian
- Morris C. Troper (1939), European director of the American Jewish Joint Distribution Committee, for relief work in France
- Marvin Traub (Chevalier, 1986), businessman, former CEO and president of Bloomingdale's
- Edward Tuck (1929) financier, diplomat, and philanthropist. Awarded the Grand Cross of the Legion of Honor.

U–W

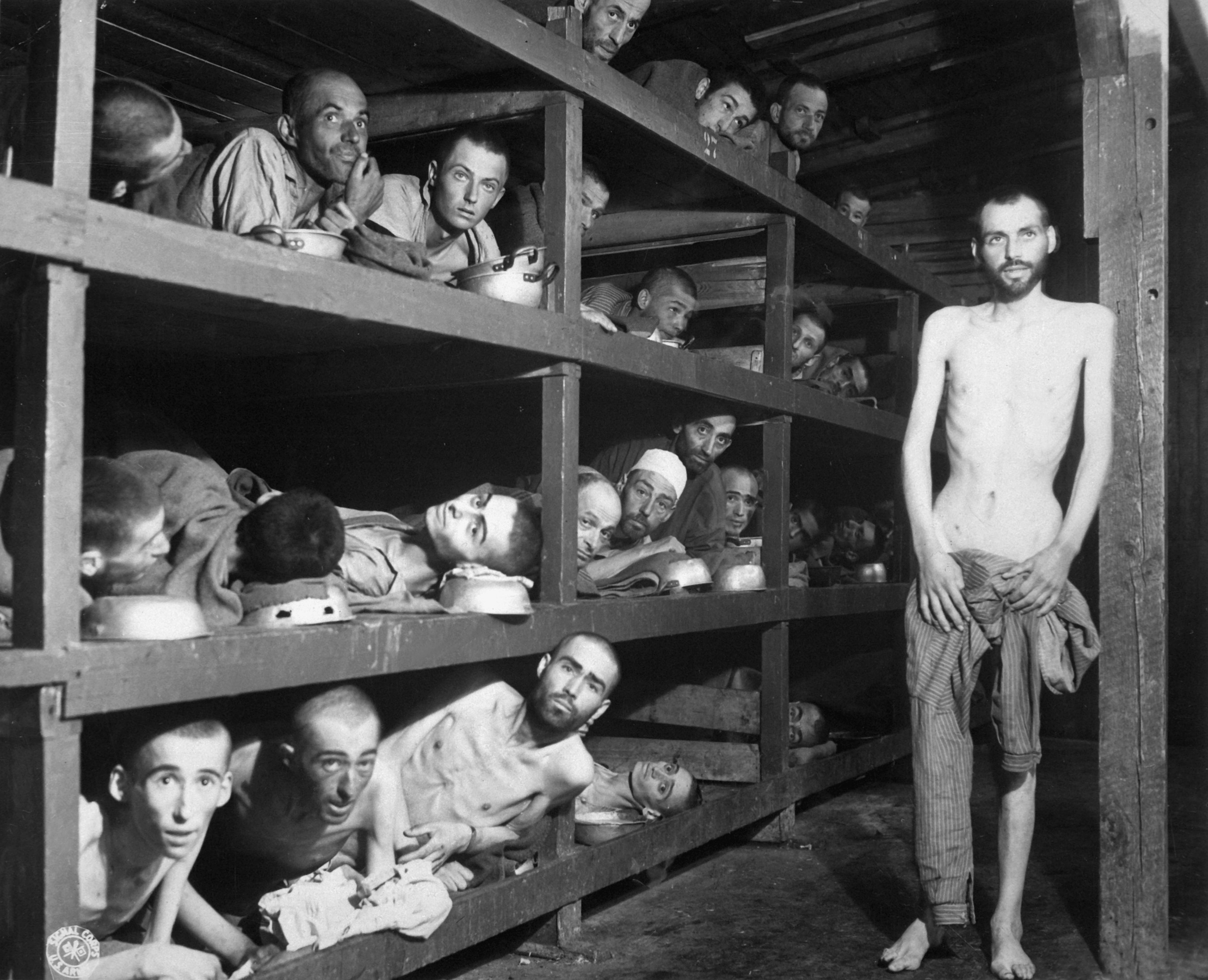
Buchenwald concentration camp, photo taken 16 April 1945, five days after liberation of the camp. Elie Wiesel is in the second row from the bottom, seventh from the left, next to the bunk post.

- Ann Madison Washington (1932) Official hostess at the 1931 Paris Colonial Exposition
- Tony Vaccaro (1994) U.S. war photographer
- Melvin Van Peebles (2001) filmmaker, writer, and artist
- Harvey Weinstein (2012) film producer and film studio executive The French government said in October 2017 that it had started the process of revoking Mr. Weinstein's medal (see also Weinstein sexual abuse allegations)
- Orson Welles Commandeur (1982)
- Eudora Welty (1995) short story writer, novelist and photographer
- Justin DuPratt White Chevalier (1919) for legal services securing munitions to France and Britain during World War I
- Elie Wiesel Commandeur (1984) Grand-Officier (1990) Grand-Croix (2000), Holocaust survivor and author, Nobel Laureate.
- Marion Wiesel Chevalier (1991) Officer (2000) Commandeur (2007), Holocaust survivor, translator, and philanthropist.
- Shelby Westbrook (2013) for his aerobatic heroism in Operation Dragoon in Southern France during WWII. As a Tuskegee Airman, one of the few Black Americans to be so honored.
- George Westinghouse, engineer and entrepreneur, known for creating railway air brakes and founding Westinghouse Electric Corporation
- William Westmoreland (1945) Commanded US forces during the Vietnam War
- Robert E. Wood (1932) Brigadier general, president of Sears Roebuck, reproduced Mount Vernon in Paris for the 1931 Colonial Exposition
- Oliver Wright (Chevalier, 1909; Officier, 1924) inventor, known for inventing and flying the first successful airplane
- Wilbur Wright (Chevalier, 1909) inventor, known for inventing and flying the first successful airplane
- Greg Wyler (2018) for entrepreneurship in satellite networking to close the digital divide.

X–Z

- Charles E. "Chuck" Yeager (Chevalier, 2003), brigadier general, USAF and flying ace. Awarded Legion of Honour for his service in World War II.
- Alvin York (1918) corporal while fighting for the AEF, for service in France.
- Elias Zerhouni (2008) M.D., director of the National Institutes of Health
- Ahmed Zewail (Chevalier), chemist, known for his work in femtochemistry

=== Institutions/organizations ===
- United States Military Academy
- United States Naval Academy
- United States Army, 371st Infantry Regiment
- United States Army, 442nd Regimental Combat Team

== Uruguay ==
- Hugo Batalla (1926-1998), Uruguay politician and Vice president of the Republic.
- China Zorrilla (Chevalier, 2008) actress
- Laetitia d'Arenberg (Chevalier, 2009), businesswoman and socialite

== Venezuela ==
- Simon Planas (1855), politician
- Juan Jose Flores (1868), Venezuelan born, President of Ecuador
- Reynaldo Hahn (1937), composer
- Arturo Uslar Pietri (1990), intellectual, lawyer, journalist, writer, television producer and politician.
- Sofia Imber, journalist, founder of the "Museo de Arte Contemporáneo de Caracas" (Contemporary Art Museum of Caracas)
- Jacinto Convit (2011), physician and scientist, known for developing a vaccine in an attempt to fight leprosy and his studies to cure different types of cancer.
- Jose Antonio Abreu (2007), conductor, composer, founder of El Sistema
- Carlos Cruz-Diez (2012), kinetic and op artist.

== Vietnam ==
- Cao Xuân Dục (Officier, 1912) scholar, historian-mandarin, court adviser.
- Tô Lâm (Grand-croix, 2026) General Secretary of the Communist Party of Vietnam, President of Vietnam.

== Yemen ==
- Amat Al Alim Alsoswa, the United Nations assistant secretary general, assistant administrator of United Nations Development Programme (UNDP) and director of its regional bureau for Arab states. She was awarded officier in the Order of the Légion d'Honneur
- Khadija Al Salami, film producer

== Yugoslavia ==
- King Alexander I of Yugoslavia, was awarded Grand Cross
- Maria of Yugoslavia, consort of King Alexander I of Yugoslavia, was awarded Grand Cross
- Vladimir Cukavac, general of the Royal Yugoslav Army, was awarded in 1934
- King Peter of Yugoslavia II, son of the King Alexander I of Yugoslavia, was awarded Grand Cross
- Josip Broz Tito, Grand Cross was awarded on 7 May 1953
- Petar Zdravkovski, general consul of Yugoslavia in Marseilles (1954–1957) was awarded officier in the Order of the Légion d'Honneur on 7 May 1953
- Liljana Todorova, (1983), philologist, University professor, diplomat
- Branko Mamula, Minister of defence SFRY, was awarded Grand Oficier

== Other countries ==
- Czechoslovakia – Tomáš Garrigue Masaryk, President of Czechoslovakia, Edvard Beneš, President of Czechoslovakia, Antonín Hasal, Czechoslovak Army general,
- Moldova – Maia Sandu, President of Moldova since 2020, Grand Cross
- Myanmar – Aung San Suu Kyi, politician, Pro-democracy leader; won 1991 Nobel Laureate in peace. Awarded the honor by French Foreign Minister Alain Juppé on 16 January 2012
- Paraguay – Francisco Solano López, grand marshal and president of his country during 1862–1870, received in 1854 the Grand Cross of the Legion of Honour in the degree of Commandeur for military service
- Philippines – Fidel V. Ramos, former president of the Philippines and Korean War veteran
- Russia – Gérard Depardieu French-born actor, citizen of the Russian Federation
- Slovakia - Mária Krasnohorská. Slovak ambassador to France (2001-2007)
- Uzbekistan – Shavkat Mirziyoyev president of Uzbekistan „Ўзбекистон Президенти Фахрий легион ордени билан мукофотланди“.president.uz
