= Société d'aquarellistes français =

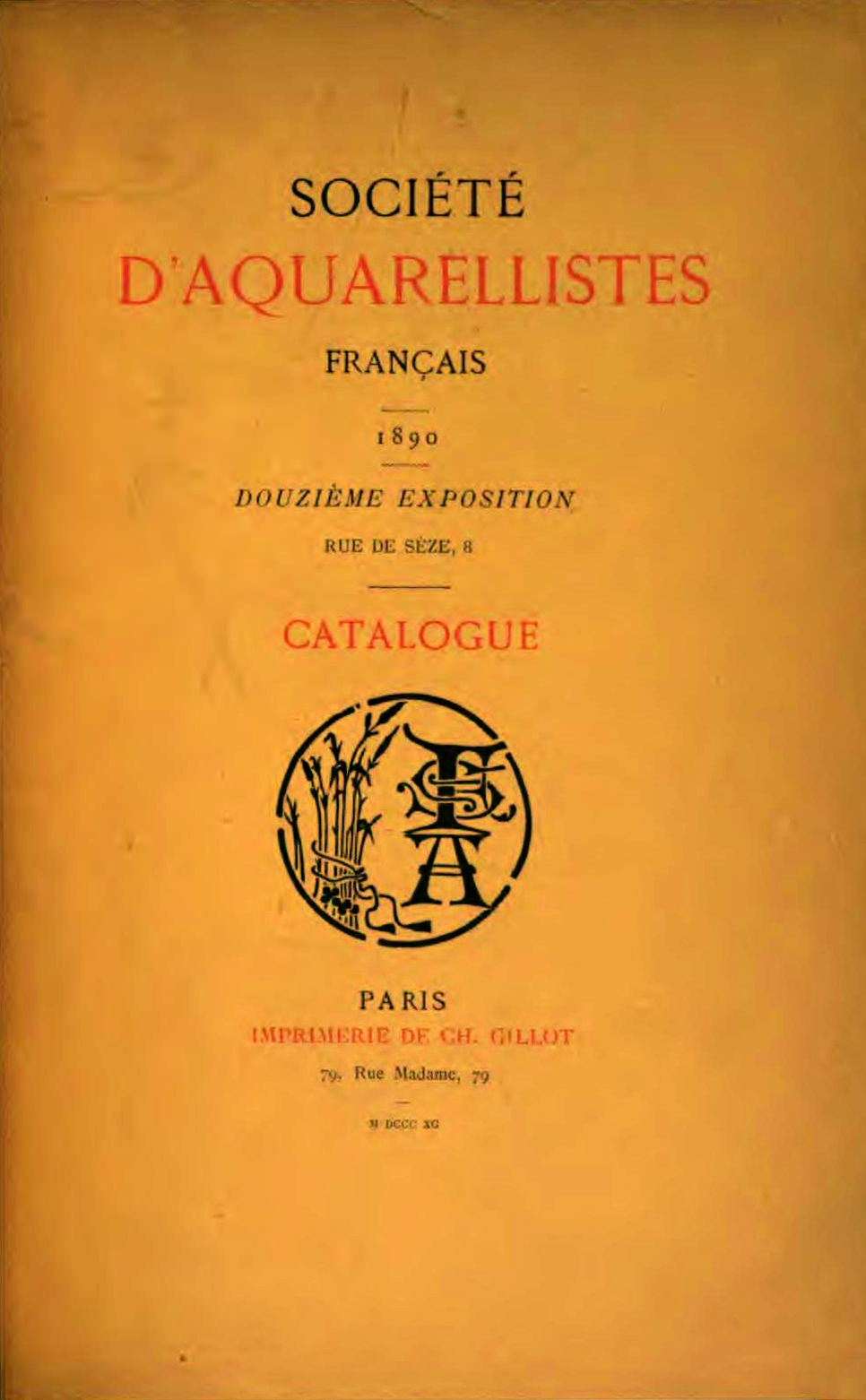
- Cover of the catalogue of the twelfth exhibition of the Société d'aquarellistes français, Paris, 1890
- Formation: 1879
- Dissolved: 1896
- Type: artistic association

The Société d'aquarellistes français (English: Society of French Watercolourists), often in uncontracted form as Société des aquarellistes français, was an association of painters in watercolour in nineteenth-century France. It held annual exhibitions of works by members; the first of these was held in the gallery of Paul Durand-Ruel at 16 rue Laffitte, Paris, in 1879. The society ceased to be active in 1896.

== Members ==
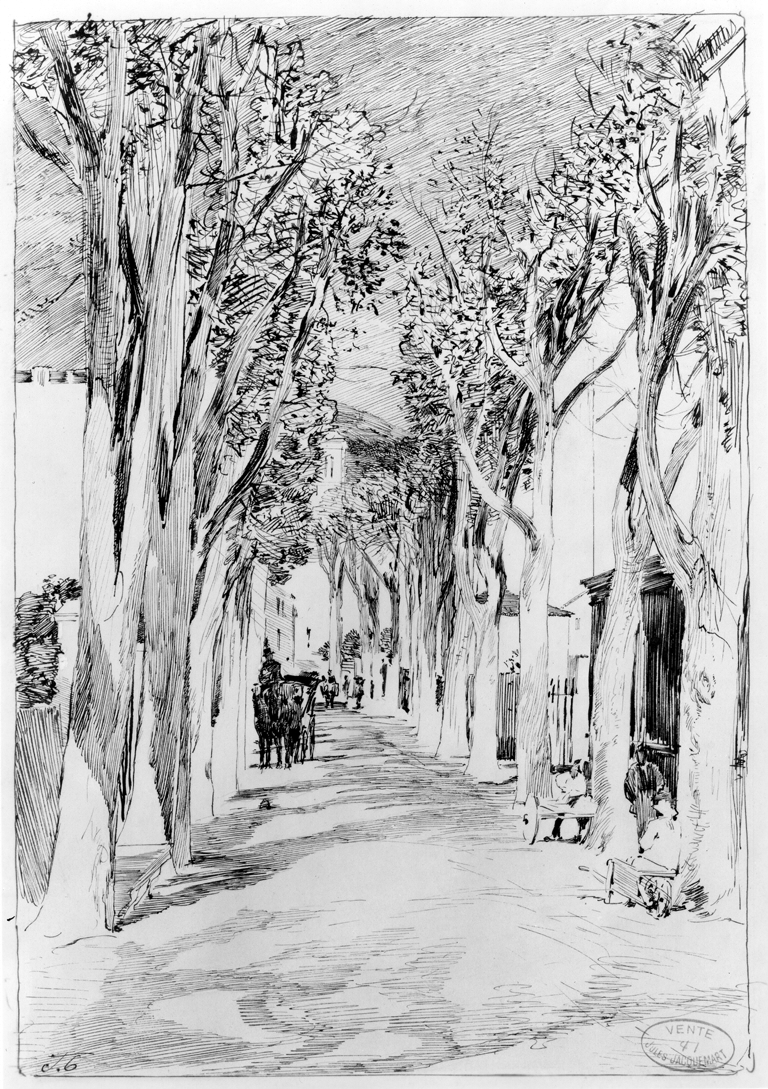
Jules-Ferdinand Jacquemart, Les Platanes en Hiver, Route de Nice, shown in the first exhibition of the Société d'aquarellistes français in 1879

In 1879, the honorary members of the society were:

- Prince de Joinville
- Édouard André
- Emmanuel Bocher
- Maurice Cottier
- Auguste Dreyfus
- Alexandre Dumas
- Viscount Étienne de Ganay
- Viscount Henri Greffulhe
- Alfred Hartmann
- Baron Edmond de Rothschild
- Count Samuel Welles de la Valette

In 1879, the ordinary members were:

- Henri Baron
- Charles-Édouard de Beaumont
- Édouard Detaille
- Gustave Doré
- François-Louis Français
- Ferdinand Heilbuth
- Eugène Isabey
- Jules Jacquemart
- Roger Jourdain
- Louis-Eugène Lambert
- Eugène Lami
- Louis Leloir
- Maurice Leloir
- Madeleine Lemaire
- Baroness Charlotte de Rothschild
- Jehan Georges Vibert
- Jules Worms

By 1890 the membership had expanded to include:

- Emile Adan
- Jean Béraud
- Albert Besnard
- Gaston Béthune
- Emile Boilvin
- Léon Bonnat
- Maurice Boutet de Monvel
- John Lewis Brown
- Jean-Charles Cazin
- Max Claude
- Georges Claude
- Benjamin-Constant
- Maurice Courant
- Robert de Cuvillon
- Charles Édouard Delort
- Guillaume Dubufe
- Ernest Duez
- Nicolas Escalier
- François Flameng
- Émile Friant
- Victor Gilbert
- Lucien Gros
- Henri Harpignies
- Pierre-Georges Jeanniot
- Roger Jourdain
- Eugène Lambert
- Jean-Paul Laurens
- Julien Le Blant
- Léon Lhermitte
- Auguste Loustaunau
- Albert Maignan
- Adrien Marie
- Charles Meissonier
- Eugène Morand
- Adrien Moreau
- Aimé Morot
- Charles Olivier de Penne
- Paul Pujol
- James Tissot
- Edmond Yon
- Henri Zuber
