= Ferdinand Heilbuth =

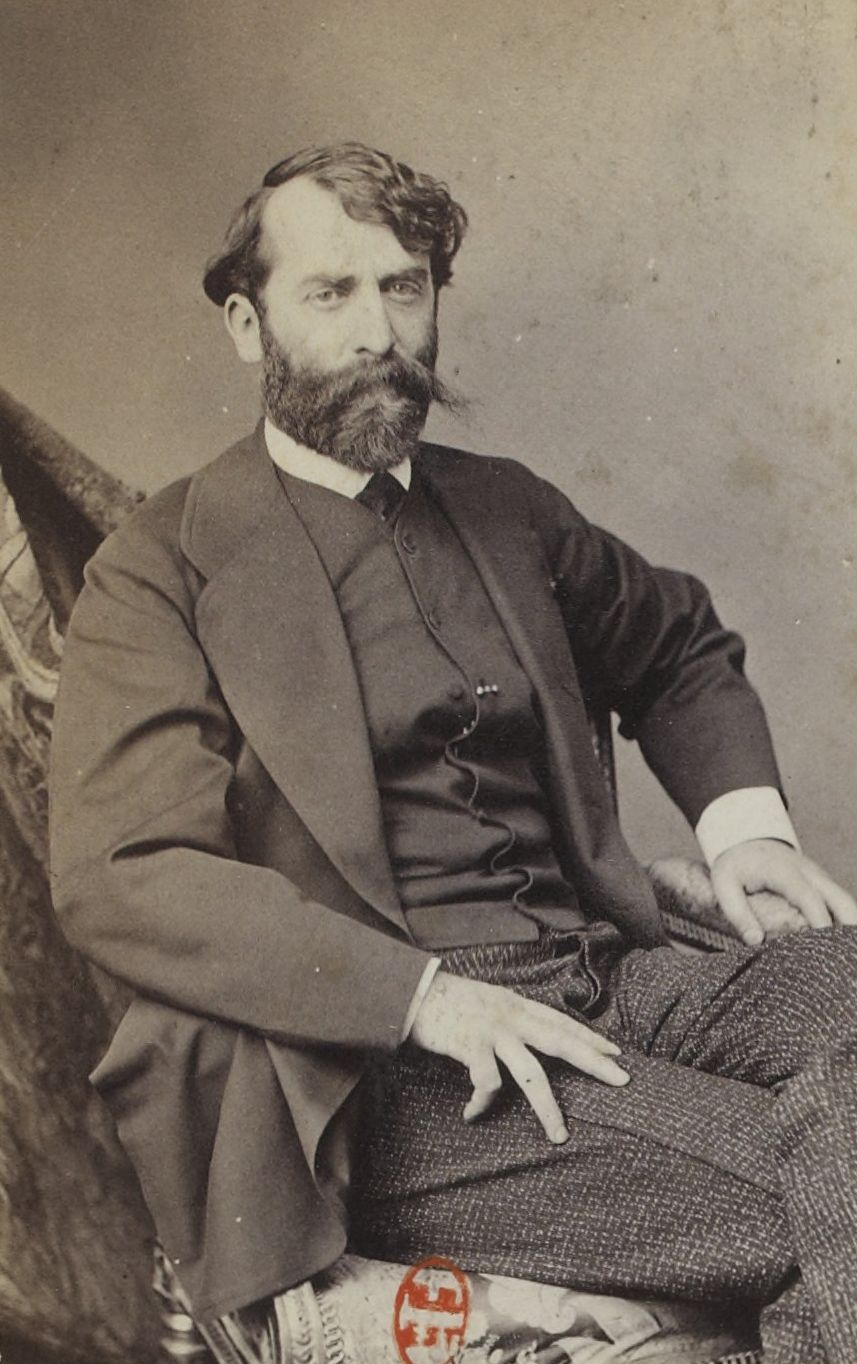
Ferdinand Heilbuth; by Robert Jefferson Bingham

Ferdinand Heilbuth (27 June 1826, Hamburg - 19 November 1889, Paris) was a French painter; originally from Germany.

== Biography ==
His father, also named Ferdinand Heilbuth, was a Rabbi. He initially pursued rabbinical studies but, after a visit to Antwerp in 1843, he decided to devote himself to art.

He arrived in Paris in 1848 and enrolled at the workshop of Paul Delaroche, which was later taken over by Charles Gleyre. In 1850, finding himself penniless, he took up temporary residence with two political refugees from Germany. They shared a small apartment in Montmartre. He had his first showing at the Salon of 1853.

Between 1853 and 1855 he paid several visits to Rome. At first, he focused on historical paintings, but soon switched to more colorful genre scenes. He was awarded medals at the Salon of 1857, Salon of 1859 and Salon of 1861. In 1863, his works were presented at the Boston Athenæum.

In 1870, during the Franco-Prussian War, he went to live in London. There, he exhibited at the Royal Academy and the Grosvenor Gallery. He returned to Paris 1874 and became a French citizen in 1879. He was named an Officer in the Legion of Honor in 1881.

During that time, he began creating watercolors and became a founding member of the Société d'aquarellistes français. He would also be increasingly influenced by Impressionism.

He died in 1889, at his mansion on the Rue Ampère, which had been built for him in 1882 by the architect Gustave Adolphe Gerhardt He was interred at the Cimetière du Père-Lachaise.

== Selected paintings ==
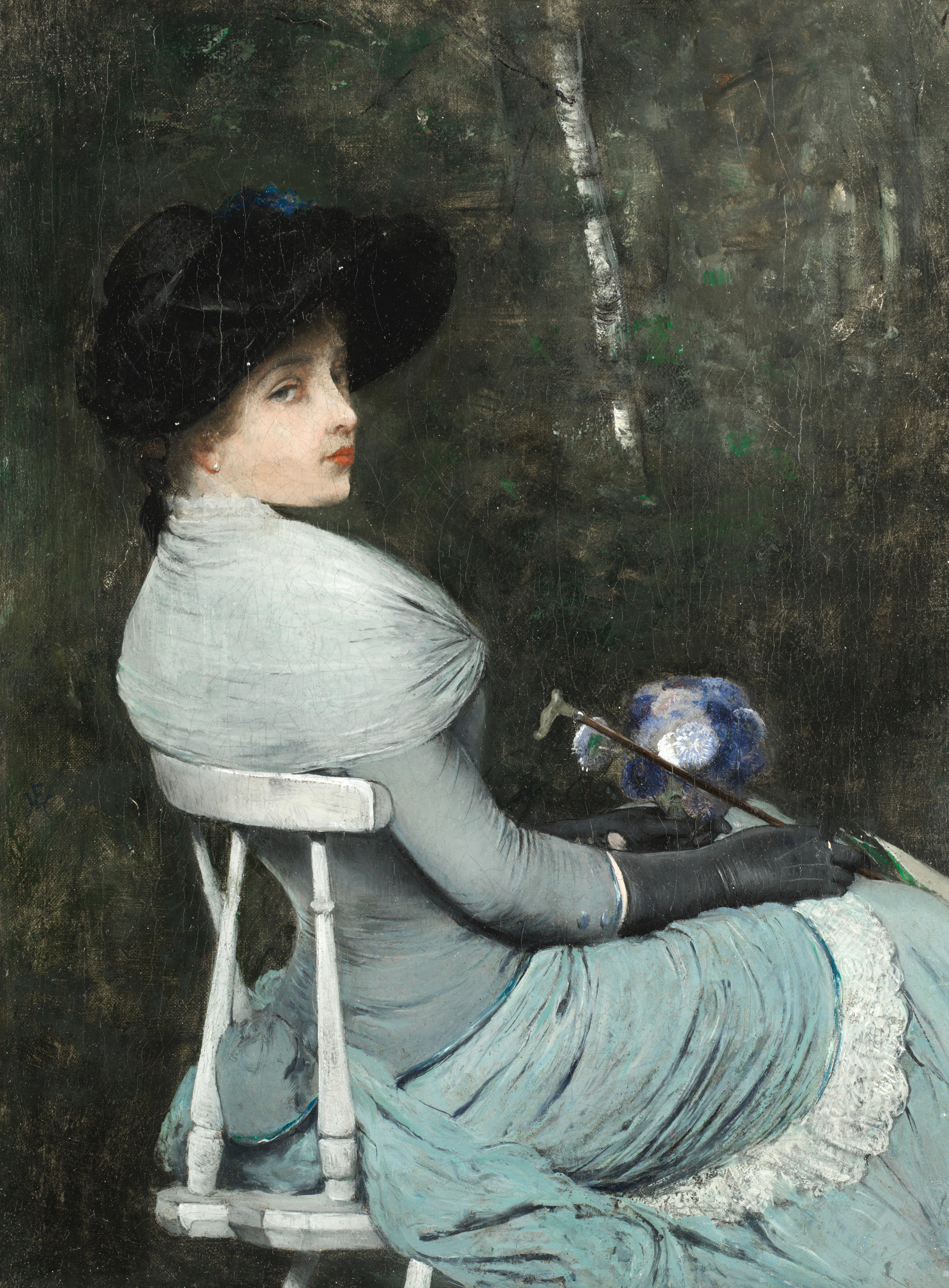
The Blue Dress

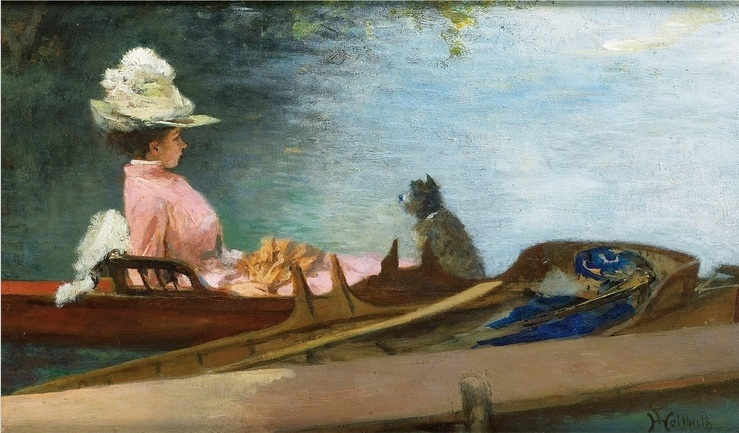
Summer on the River

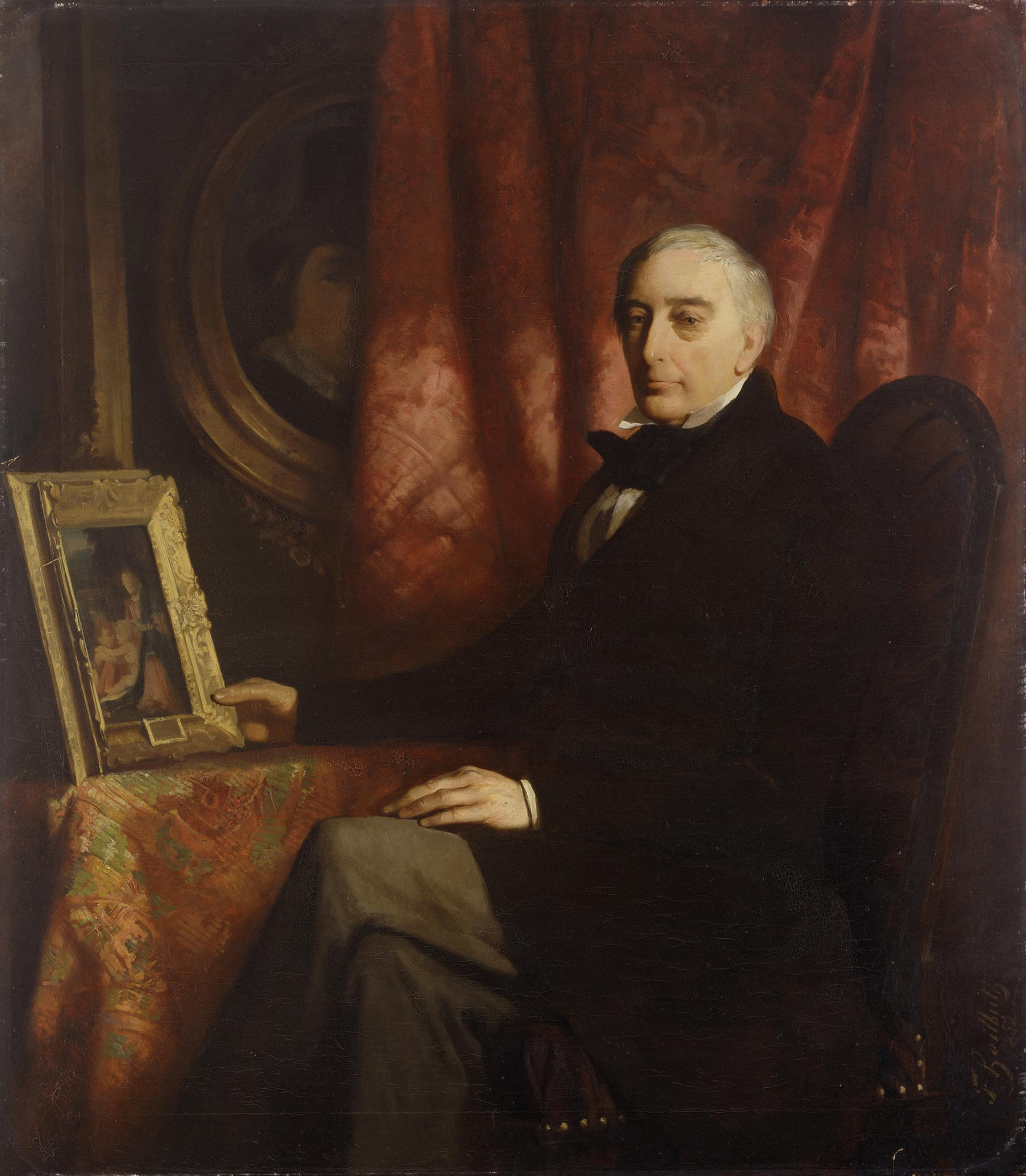
Portrait of Nicolaus Hudtwalcker

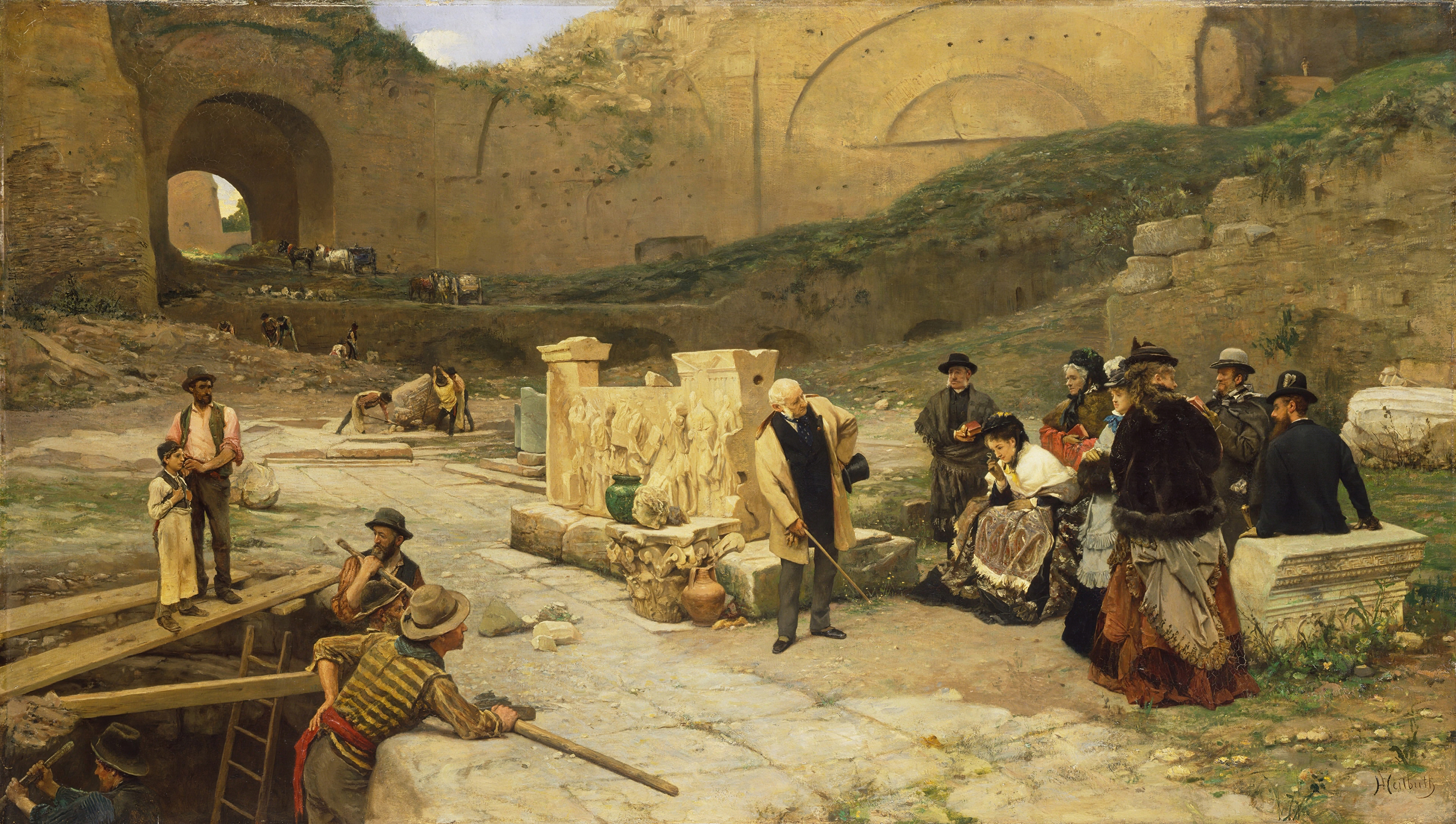
Excavations in Rome

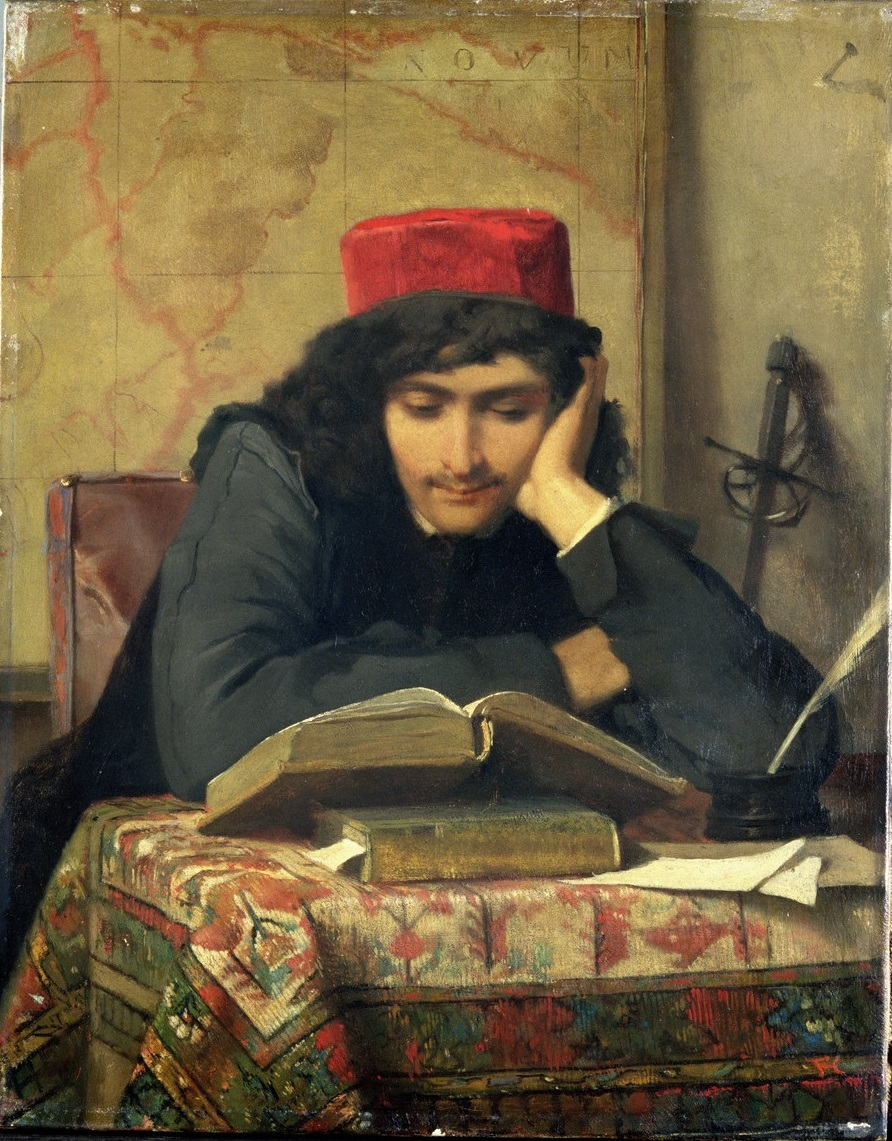
The Reader
