= Jean Gigoux =

French painter

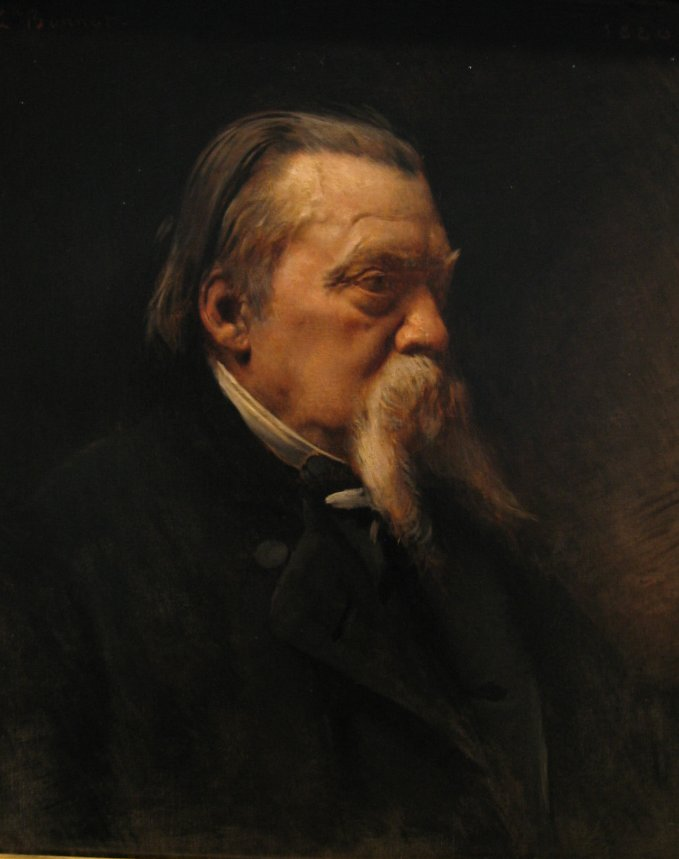
Jean Gigoux (1880); portrait by Léon Bonnat

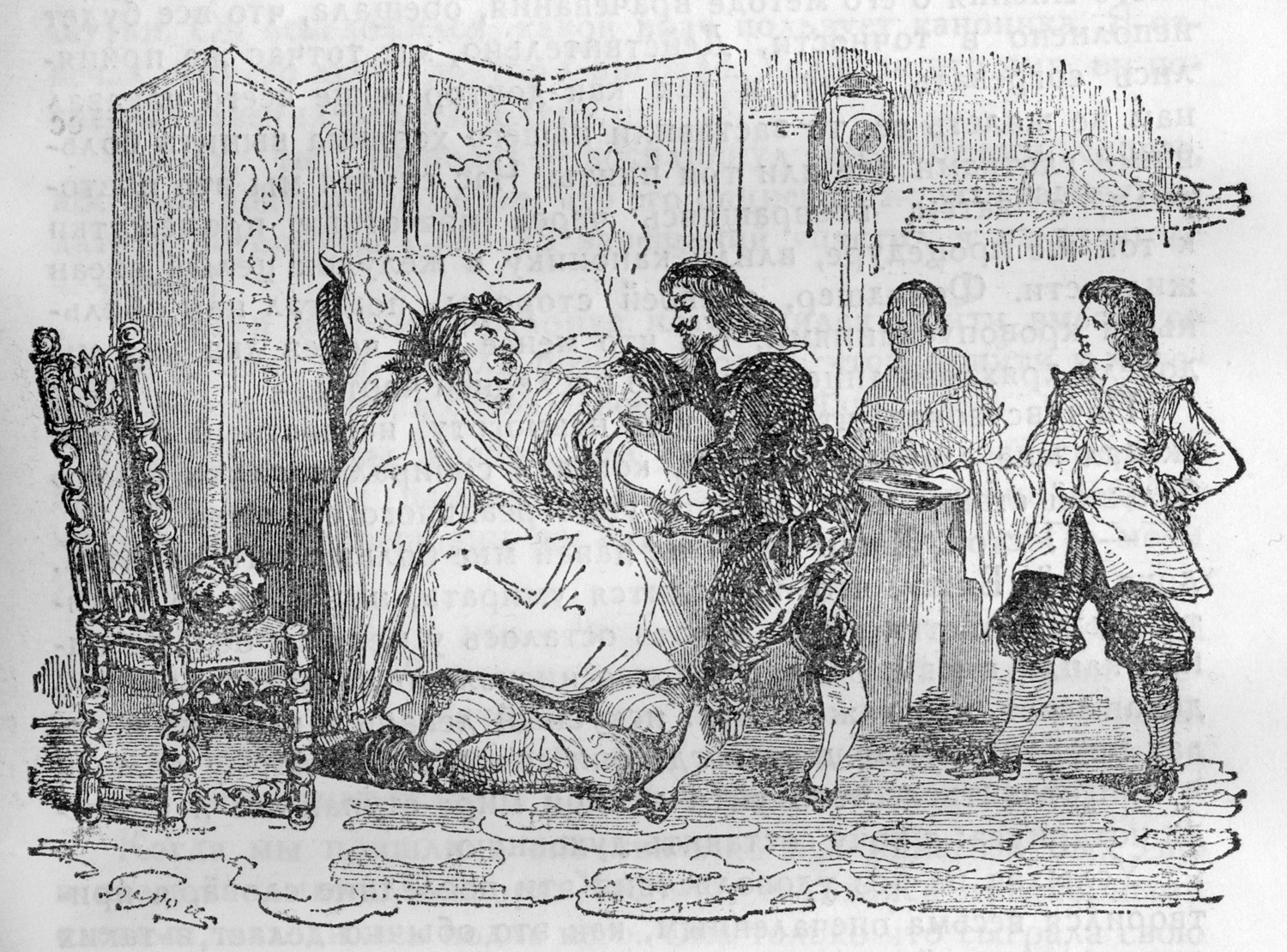
Illustration from Gil Blas

Jean François Gigoux (6 January 1806, Besançon – 11 December 1894, Paris) was a French painter, lithographer, illustrator and art collector.

== Biography ==
His father, Claude Étienne Gigoux, was a blacksmith, originally from Seveux (Haute-Saône). He began his artistic studies at the École régionale des beaux-arts de Besançon, then transferred to the École des Beaux-Arts of Paris in 1828, where he studied with Théodore Géricault and Jean-Baptiste-Camille Corot, who helped him finance a study trip to Italy. In 1831, he had his debut at the Salon of 1831.

In 1833, he became a contributor to Le Magasin pittoresque. Two years later, he created several hundred woodcuts for Gil Blas by Alain-René Lesage, which brought him a great deal of notoriety. He was named a Chevalier in the Legion of Honour in 1842. Several of his students became well-known; notably Henri Baron, Léopold Flameng and François-Louis Français.

Despite his professional successes, he may be best remembered for taking Ewelina Hańska, the widow of Honoré de Balzac, as his mistress.

He died in Paris in 1894, having bequeathed more than 3000 drawings and 460 paintings to the Musée des Beaux-Arts et d'Archéologie de Besançon, making him one of their four principal donors. A monument has been erected at his tomb in the Champs-Bruley cemetery in Besançon.

A retrospective exhibit of his work was held at the Musée des beaux-arts de Rouen in 2007–2008. His works may also be seen at the Musée des Beaux-Arts de Rouen, the Musée des beaux-arts de Chambéry, Musée Magnin and the Louvre.
