= François-Louis Français =

French artist known for painting and printmaking (1814–1897)

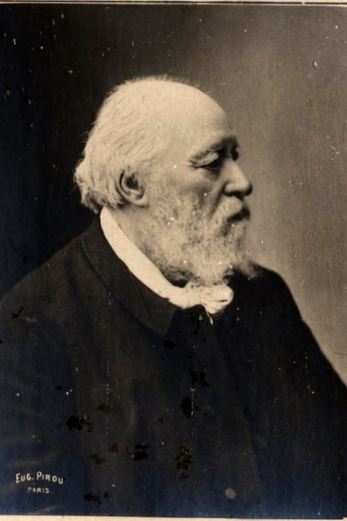
- Born: François-Louis Français; 17 November 1814; Plombières-les-Bains, Vosges
- Died: 18 May 1897 (aged 82); Plombières-les-Bains
- Education: Jean Gigoux
- Known for: Oil painting, watercolours, print-making
- Notable work: Orphée (1863), Bois sacré (1866), Le Ruisseau du Puits-Noir (1875)
- Movement: Naturalism, landscape, illustration.
- Awards: Légion d'honneur - Chevalier (Knight) (1853); Legion d’honneur – Officier (Officer) (1867)
- Patrons: Paul Lagarde, Alfred Hartmann

François-Louis Français (French pronunciation: [fʁɑ̃swa lwi fʁɑ̃sɛ]; 1814–1897), usually known as Louis Français, was a French painter, lithographer and illustrator who became one of the most commercially successful landscape painters of the 19th century. A former pupil of Gigoux, he began his career by studying lithography and wood engraving, becoming a prolific illustrator and printmaker. His work as an illustrator is to be found in around forty books and numerous magazines from the late 1830s to the 1860s. Français also produced a large number of pen and ink drawings, enhanced by sepia, notable for their attention to detail and for their technical adroitness and conciseness.

Français is associated with the Barbizon School of painting, a movement to represent art in nature in a Romantic, Realist context. In 1836 whilst at Barbizon he met the landscape painter Camille Corot and began a ten-year association as a friend and acolyte. Français's paintings possess some of the prominent features of the work of Corot in his use of tonal colours, loose brushwork and an emphasis on softness of form. Français exhibited first at the Paris Salon in 1837 and regularly thereafter until his death in 1897. He lived from 1846 to 1849 in Italy, where he experimented with a brighter palette. His work developed neo-classical sentiments with mythical creatures appearing within a realist landscape. Whilst this bought him commercial success it alienated some critics who were harsh in their judgement of his work. A well respected and decorated artist within France, he was also internationally well known during his lifetime exhibiting abroad in Geneva and London but following his death in 1897, his reputation declined and there are relatively few of his paintings on show in public galleries beyond France.

== Early years ==
François-Louis Français was born in Plombières-les-Bains in the Vosges region on 17 November 1814. He was the son of Jean Français, a mercer and Marie-Anne Français (née Vançon). He showed aptitude in drawing from an early age and attended classes in Plombières. His family wished to encourage him and in 1829 found him a job in a bookshop in Paris where he could build up contacts with a view to becoming an illustrator. Initially he worked as a copyist, produced caricatures and drew models at the Académie Suisse. In 1831 he began studying painting and his first known landscapes are from this period . It was a period of struggle during which he made a precarious living mainly by drawing on stone and designing woodcut vignettes for book illustration. The publishing firm of Paulin employed him and in 1833 offered Français the opportunity to illustrate some of the ornate letters in Alain-René Lesage's Histoire de Gil Blas de Santillane published in January 1835. The main illustrator of Lesage's work was Jean Gigoux, an eminent painter and illustrator and impressed by Français' potential he invited him to work at his Parisian atelier.

== Illustrator and printmaker ==
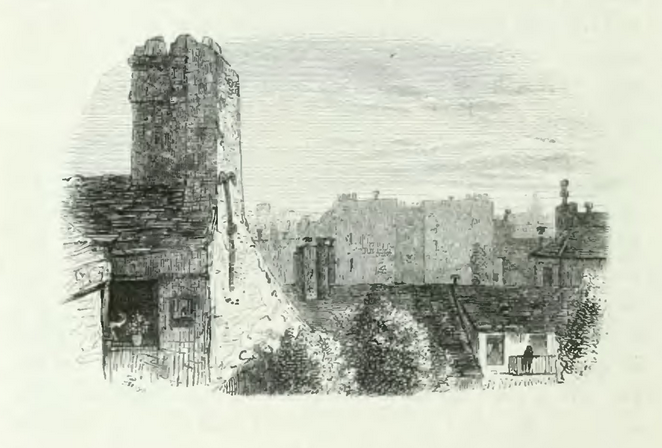
Illustration from novel by George Sand, "Le Diable à Paris". Paris, (1845)

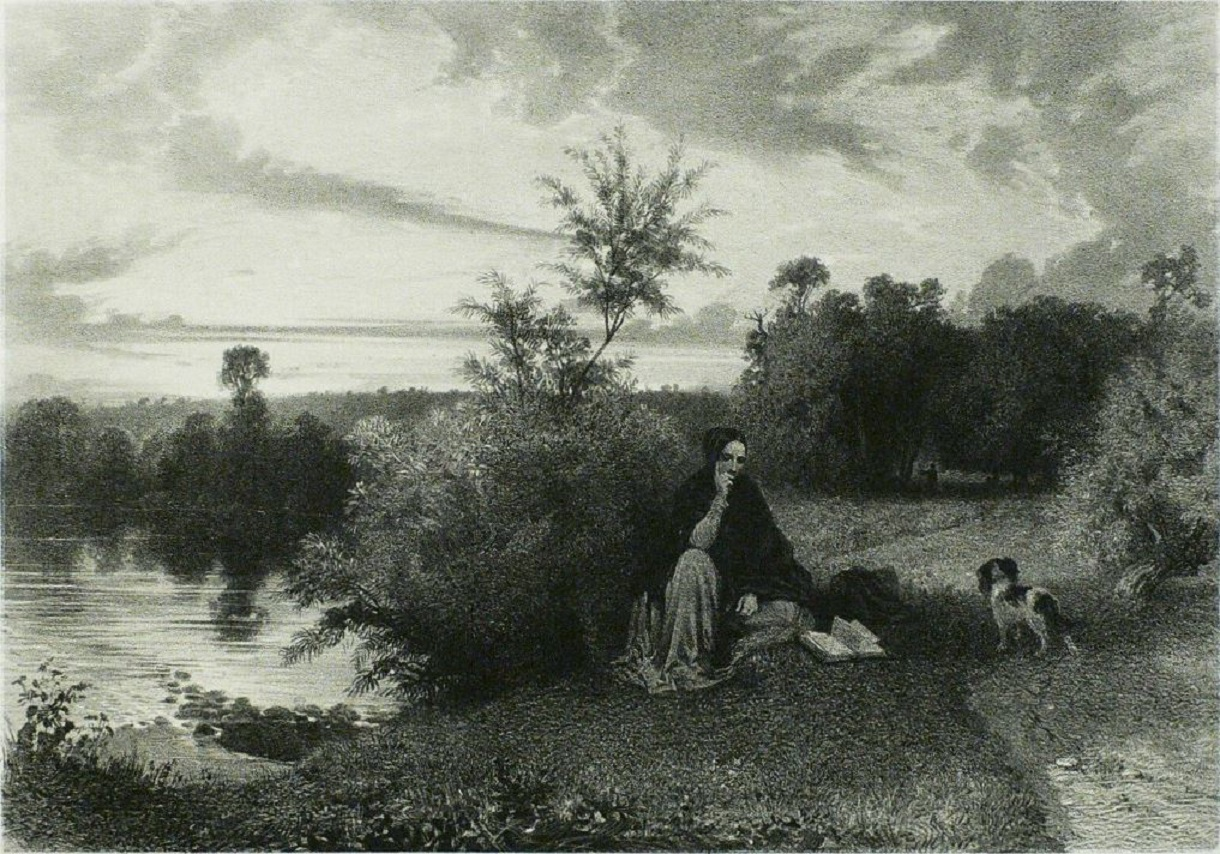
An early lithograph by Français

As an illustrator Français had a long career, until 1860, during which he drew vignettes for numerous books and magazines. It was a lucrative occupation and allowed financial security whilst he simultaneously developed his painting techniques. His illustrations for a new edition of Bernardin's romantic novel Paul et Virginie in 1835 were recognised as a high watermark of romantic illustration and began a profitable and prolific collaboration with the wood-engraver Tony Johannot, the culmination of which was around two hundred vignettes, including around fifty landscapes. He worked with his friends Henri Baron and Célestin Nanteuil on illustrations for Les Artistes anciens et modernes. Together they founded the revue Les artistes contemporains and worked in collaboration on numerous engravings for the publishing firm Bertauts, often using the monogram B.N.F. to identify their ownership.

A noteworthy commission were the illustrations in L'abbé Jean-Jacques Bourassé's La Touraine. Histoire et monuments where Français provided forty wood engravings, five engraved plates and eleven beautiful ornate letters, for which he and his collaborator Karl Girardet, earned a gold medal at the Exposition Universelle in 1855. Amongst the many prints that he supervised were those done after Corot's landscape, Sunset (1840), Diaz's Bathers (1847) and several of his own paintings. Many prints were reused, for example, Un Chemin (A Road) was first published in Paris by Augustin Challamel for the Paris Salon of 1842. Ten years later a second state was published by Marchant for the series, Les Peintres vivants .

== Painting career ==
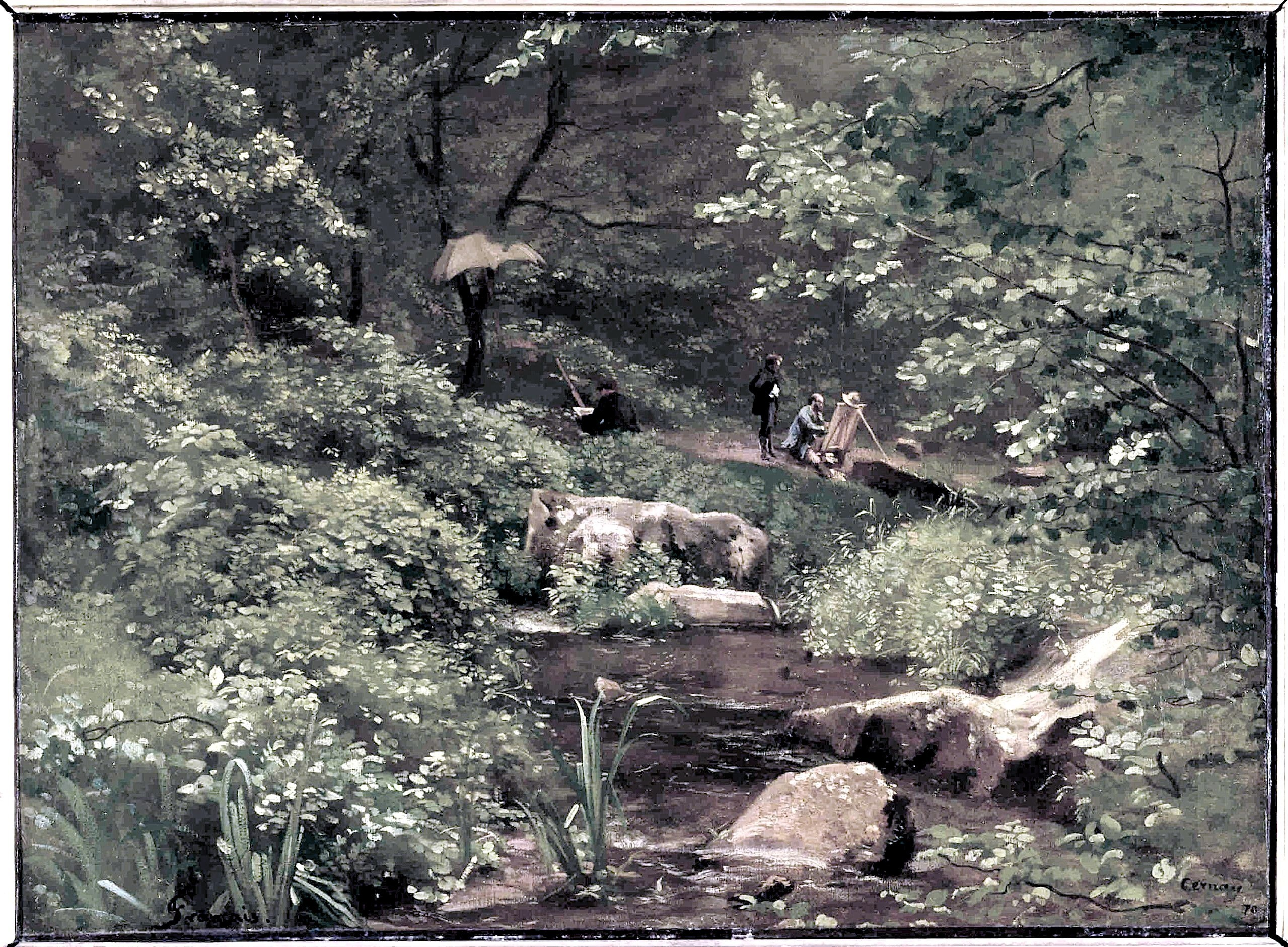
Les peintres au Vaux-de-Cernay, (1870)

In 1834 Français went to live at Barbizon and painted in the nearby Forest of Fontainbleu. He was part of the Barbizon school of artists dedicated to painting directly from nature, often en plein air, who settled in the area around the Auberge Ganne Inn. In a radical departure from formalism in art, nature itself became the subject of the painting. as many artists met at the Inn to discuss ideas and to set forth to paint in the Forest. Français met and befriended fellow artist Louis Cabat and in 1836 he became acquainted with Camille Corot, eighteen years older than Français and with whom he formed a strong personal bond of friendship and as a personal adviser, who was willing to offer technical advice and to introduce Français to some influential people. Under Corot's influence Français developed a style of landscape painting using tonal colours to express light that are reminiscent of Corot. Français was never able to capture Corot's delicacy at depicting the human form but he developed exponentially into a fine landscape painter, albeit one that maintained an element of formalism. This formality was not surprising from a student of Gigoux but Français is known to have studied and admired the work of the early baroque painter Claude Lorrain’s work at The Louvre. The occasional use of neo-classical subjects and the placing of mythological figures within the landscape that Français sometimes adopted bear a resemblance to the oeuvre of Lorrain.

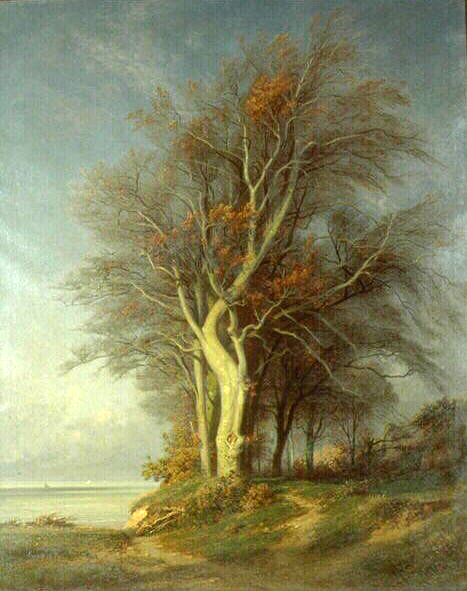
Les Hêtres de la côte de Grâce près de Honfleur (1859).

In 1837 Français exhibited at the Salon for the first time, presenting Sous les saules (Under the Willows) (1837: Tours museum), a painting where the figures are by Henri Baron. The exhibition catalogue listed 2,130 entries but Français' painting was noticed and commented upon favourably. In the mid-1840s, Français travelled regularly with Baron and their friend Nanteuil, to Bougival, a village on the Seine increasingly famous for its scenery and light changes. (Note: In the mid-19th century, Bougival was connected by the railway and quickly emerged as a fashionable suburb of Paris, where artists and writers who included Turgenev, who died in Bougival in 1883 lived and worked. Artists including Renoir, Monet, Morisot and Sisley painted in the area which has since become known as the Cradle of Impressionism.) The paintings from this period, several of which were transposed to lithographs, are often signed Français, Elèves de Bougival (Student of Bougival). Soleil couchant (1845, Musée des Beaux-Arts de Dijon), an autumnal landscape of the river at Bougival, was presented at the 1845 Salon of Charles Baudelaire, one of three that the poet organised. Baudelaire praised the canvas, as an example, of how to capture the poetic realism of nature.

In 1846 Français travelled to Italy for the first time staying in various locations: Rome (1846/9), Genoa (1846), Pisa (1846), Florence (1846/7), Frascati (1847), Ariccia (1848) and Tivoli (1848/49). This extended sojourn enabled Français to develop his style. His palette became more luminous and he began to paint in the closely set strokes that would be a feature of his later work. He acquired a passion for painting the light and would return to Italy throughout his career. He accumulated numerous drawings, sketches and watercolours often in gouache which enabled him to execute some of his best known canvases from the period that included Fontaine à Ariccia (Fountain at Ariccia) (1848, Paris Mus d ‘Orsay). Returning to France he travelled and painted extensively throughout France in the 1850s. He regularly visited Plombières and the Loire valley, where he favoured realistic forest landscapes and riverbanks scenes. Français was often in the company of other artists during these visits and with Corot, Courbet, Jongkind and the locally born Boudin, he was part of école de Honfleur (Honfleur school) that was drawn to paint the light and landscapes around Honfleur in Normandy. The images created during this interlude, by Français and his fellow artists, later inspired Jongkind and Claude Monet to open the Impressionist School of St. Simeon at Honfleur in 1862. Les Hêtres de la côte de Grâce près de Honfleur (1859) is a fine example of his work in Normandy in the 1850s. It features a weathered tree distorted by the coastal winds that buffet the coast. As always with Français there is precision in the detail. Much of the painting features a forbidding sky that pays debt to Français' knowledge of Constable.

== Career after 1860 ==
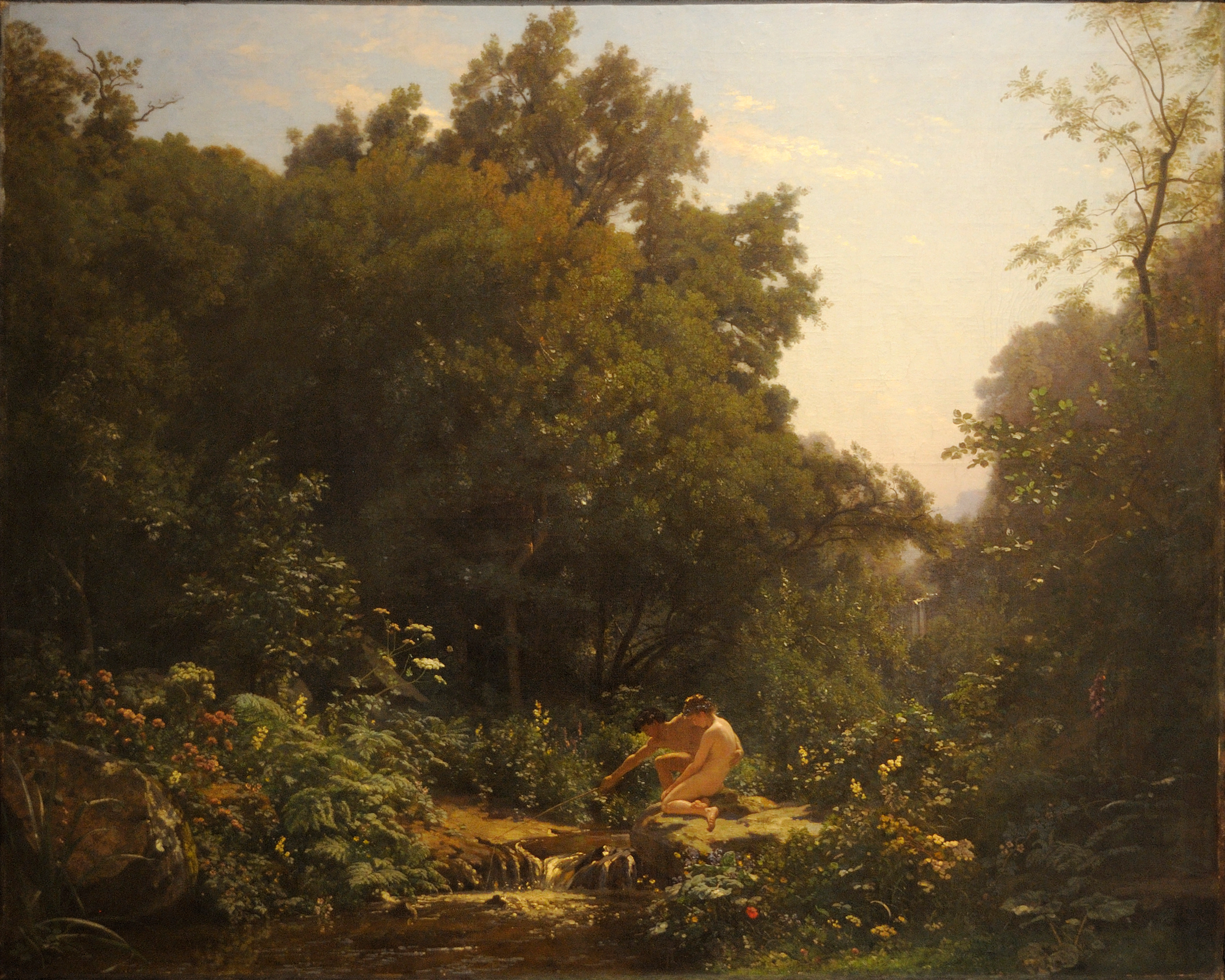
Daphnis et Chloé oil painting. (1872)

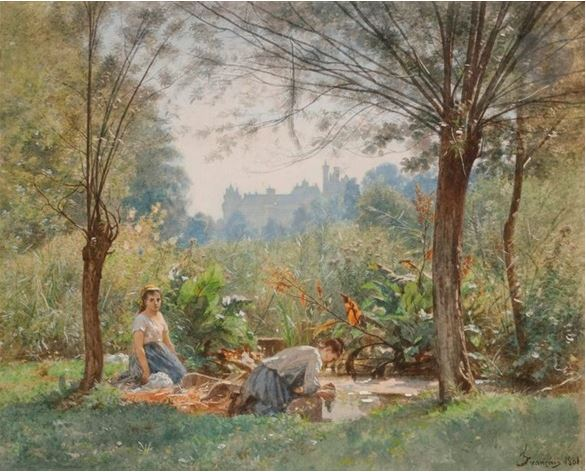
Vue animée de Pierrefonds avec deux lavandières au premier plan (1881)

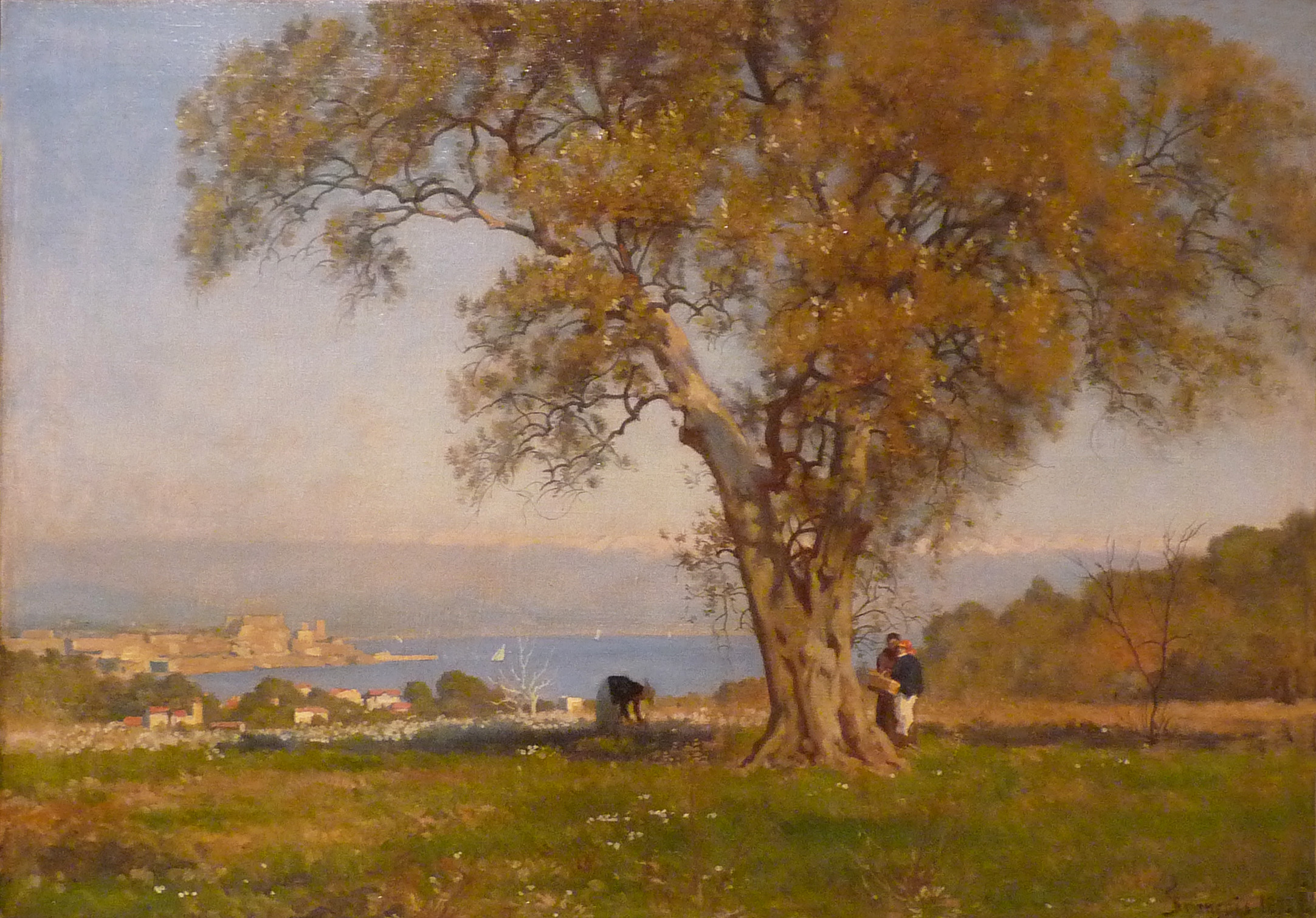
Vue d'Antibes (1894).

Français was a successful painter by the 1860s. He had a regular income, not least from his patron the Alsatian industrialist Alfred Hartmann, the younger brother of Frédéric Hartmann, Théodore Rousseau’s long-suffering and most important patron of the Second Empire. His paintings were invariably accepted at the Parisian salons. They were not always well received by some critics. His painting, Bois sacré, (Sacred wood) (1864), now at the Lille, Palais des Beaux-Arts was heavily criticised, as not up to standard by some observers, who objected to the admittedly dominant, mythical figures at the centre of a realist canvas. His patron Hartmann didn’t like it either, as he made clear in a letter to Rousseau. Le Bois sacré was one of a series of popular realism landscapes containing neo-classical themes that Français produced in the 1860s, often from sketches made following an Italian visit such as that to Naples in 1859 and to Pompeii in 1864-5.

He continued to travel extensively throughout his life and in common with many well-off French people would spend his winters in warmer southern climes, after 1873 in Nice, often with his companion Rose Maireau, an engraver who exhibited her work at Petit Palais shortly after it opened in 1900. In 1878, after six years of intermittent work he completed a series of decorative panels for the font of the new Second Empire church of Sainte-Trinité, Paris The avowed socialism of Français’ youth had receded to that of patriarch of the Third Republic. Also in 1878 Le Mont Cervin et Le Lac de Némi (The Matterhorn and the Lake of Némi) was awarded the Médaille d'honneur at the Paris Salon. A year after in 1879 Français was a founding member of the Société d'aquarellistes français (Society of French Watercolourists), the aim of which was to exhibit the watercolour paintings of the members, initially limited to just forty. The Society ceased in 1896.

At the 1884 Salon, he exhibited L'Étang de Clisson (Forest of Clisson) following a visit to the Loire valley. An evocation of the upper Loire, the preparatory drawings for which are at the Metropolitan Museum, the finished canvas has a freshness and a poetic naturalism reminiscent of Français’ work in the 1850s. One of his most successful later paintings is Vue d'Antibes (1894) where he returned with some effect to the landscapes and skies of Corot and Millet.

Français entered his final decade as a man with a considerable artistic reputation. In 1890 he was the first landscape artist to be elected to the Chair of the Académie Française, the same year he won the Médaille d'honneur at the Société des Artistes Français where he exhibited two landscapes. He had international recognition which eluded many French artists. He exhibited at Geneva in 1857, 1858 and 1861 and in London in 1862 and 1874. Following his death a rather grand memorial was erected to his memory at Plombières-les-Bains. His former studio in Plombières is now the Musée Louis Français

François-Louis Français died in Plombières on 18 May 1897.

== Bibliography ==
- Aimee Gros (Paris, 1902): François-Louis Français :Causeries et souvenirs par un de ses élèves
- Tradition and Revolution in French Art 1700 -1880: Painting and Drawings from Lille (exh.cat., London, National Gallery. 1993)
- François-Louis Français, Plombières-les-Bains, 1814-1897 : Illustrateur romantique (exh.cat., by R.Conilleau)
- Aquarelles, dessins et gravures de François-Louis Français (exh.cat, Région Lorraine, 1982–3)
- P. Miquel (1975), Le Paysage Français ay XIXe siècle 1824 – 1874 : L’Ecole de la Nature, iii (Maurs-la-Jolie), pages 608-645
- H. Chisholm, ed. (1911). "Français, François Louis". Encyclopædia Britannica. 10 (11th ed.). Cambridge University Press. p. 774.
- Laurence Pauchet-Warlop, Jane Turner (editor) (2000), The Grove Dictionary of Art, From Monet to Cézanne, Late 19th-century French Artists, p. 179–181, Oxford University Press, New York, ISBN 9780195169034
- K.S. Champa, (1991). The Rise of Landscape Painting in France: Corot to Monet. Harry N. Abrams, Inc., ISBN 0810937573
- Janine Bailly-Herzberg, (1985) Dictionnaire de l’Estampe en France, 1830-1950. Coll. « Arts et Métiers Graphiques », Paris, Flammarion, ISBN 2080120131
- François-Louis Français, Henri Baron and Célestin Nanteuil : Les Artistes anciens et modernes, 3 vols (Paris 1848–62)

== Gallery (selected) ==
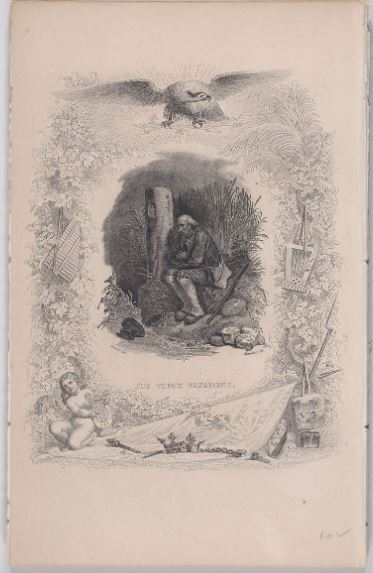
Le Vieux Vagabond, illustration from The Complete Works of Béranger (1829).jpg

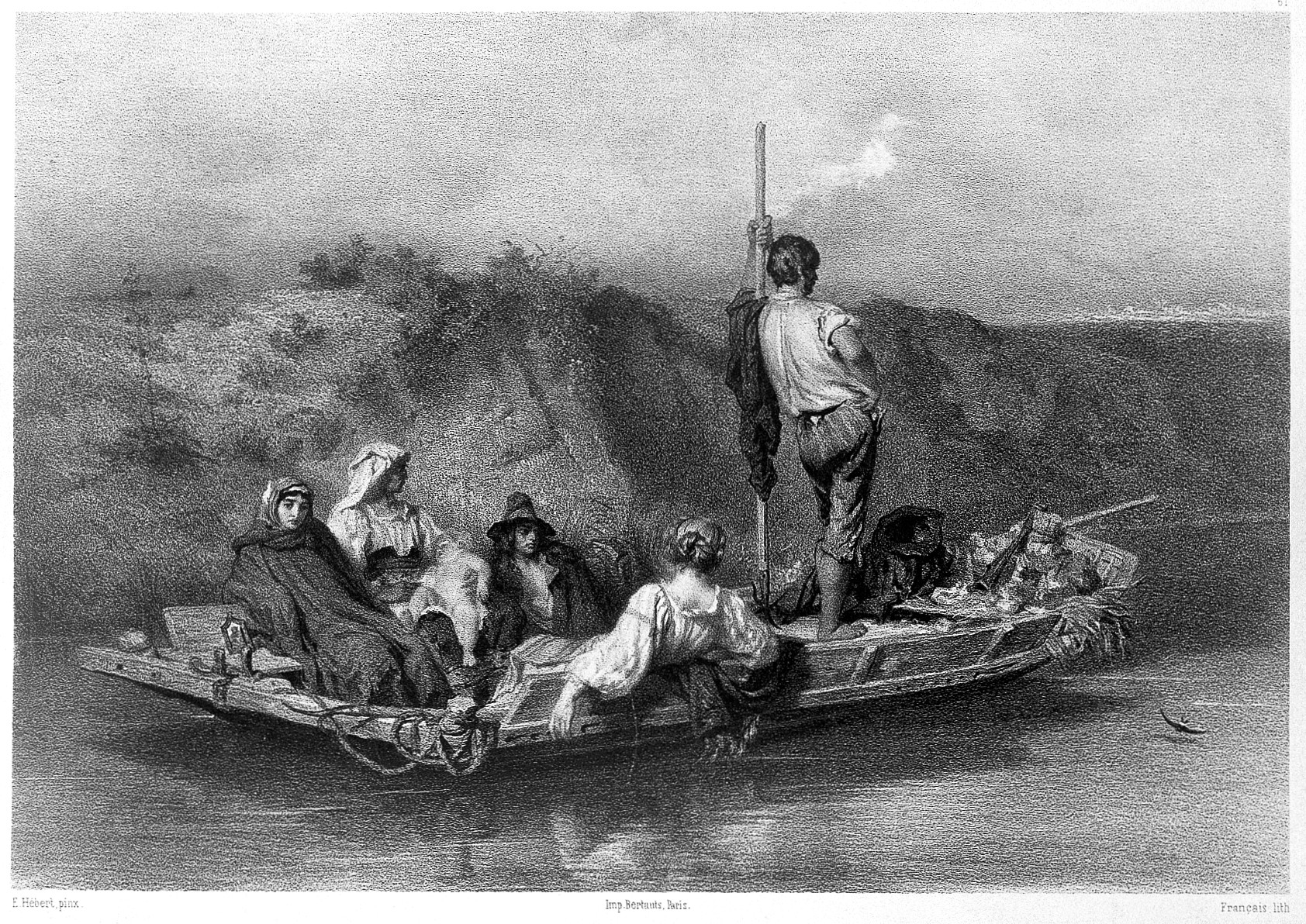
Lithograph by Français after A.E. Hébert, (1850)

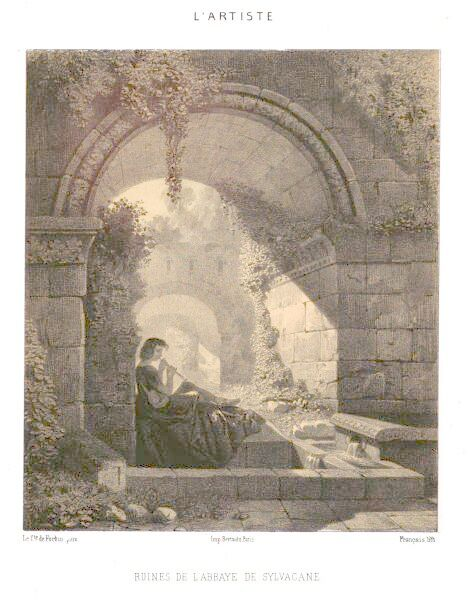
Ruines de l'abbaye de Sylvacane (Ruins of Silvacane abbey) after Auguste de Forbin, (pub 1859)

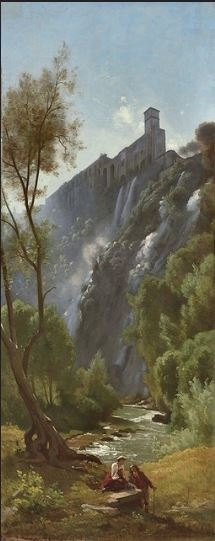
Souvenir de Tivoli (1849)

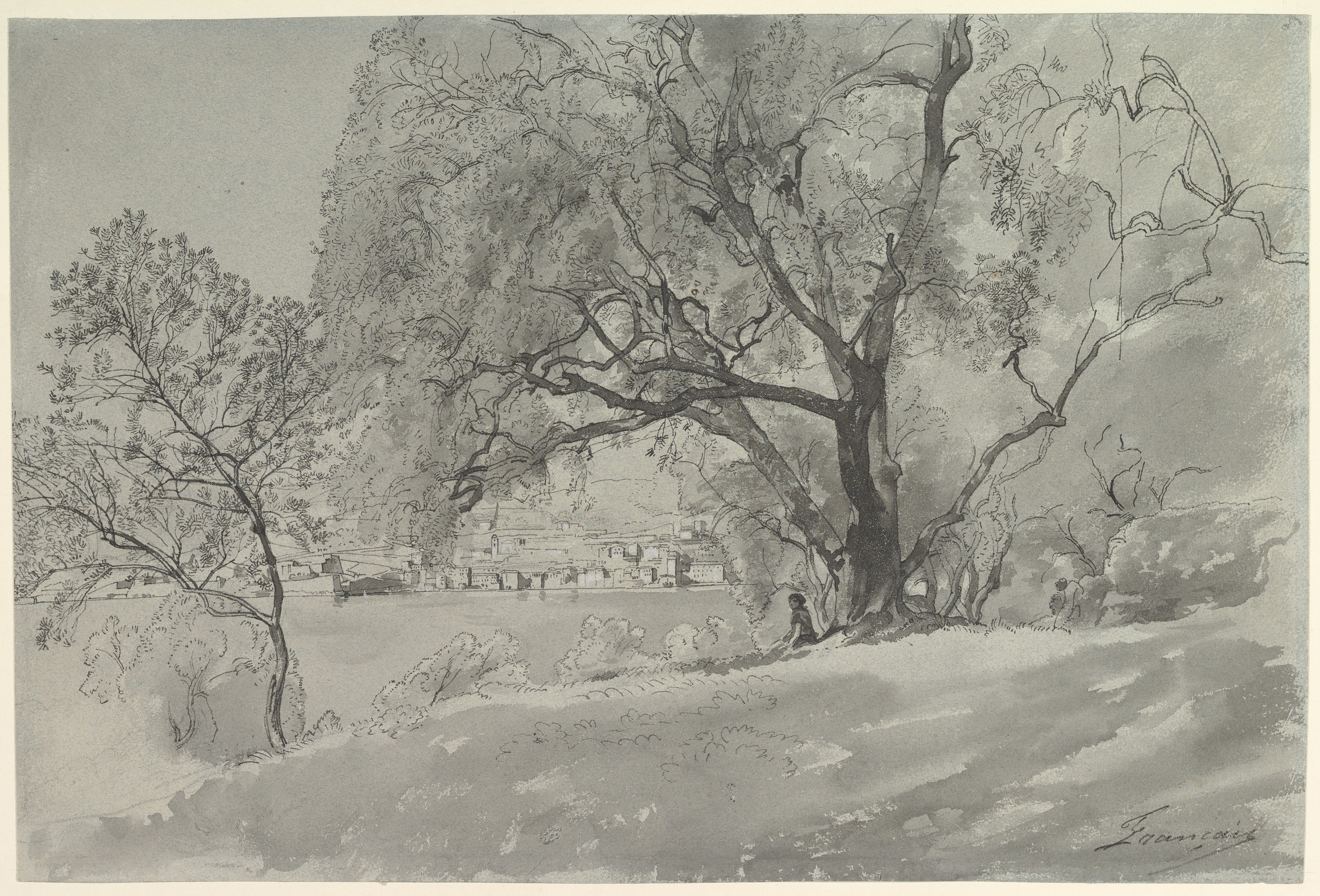
Personnage assis près d'un lac,

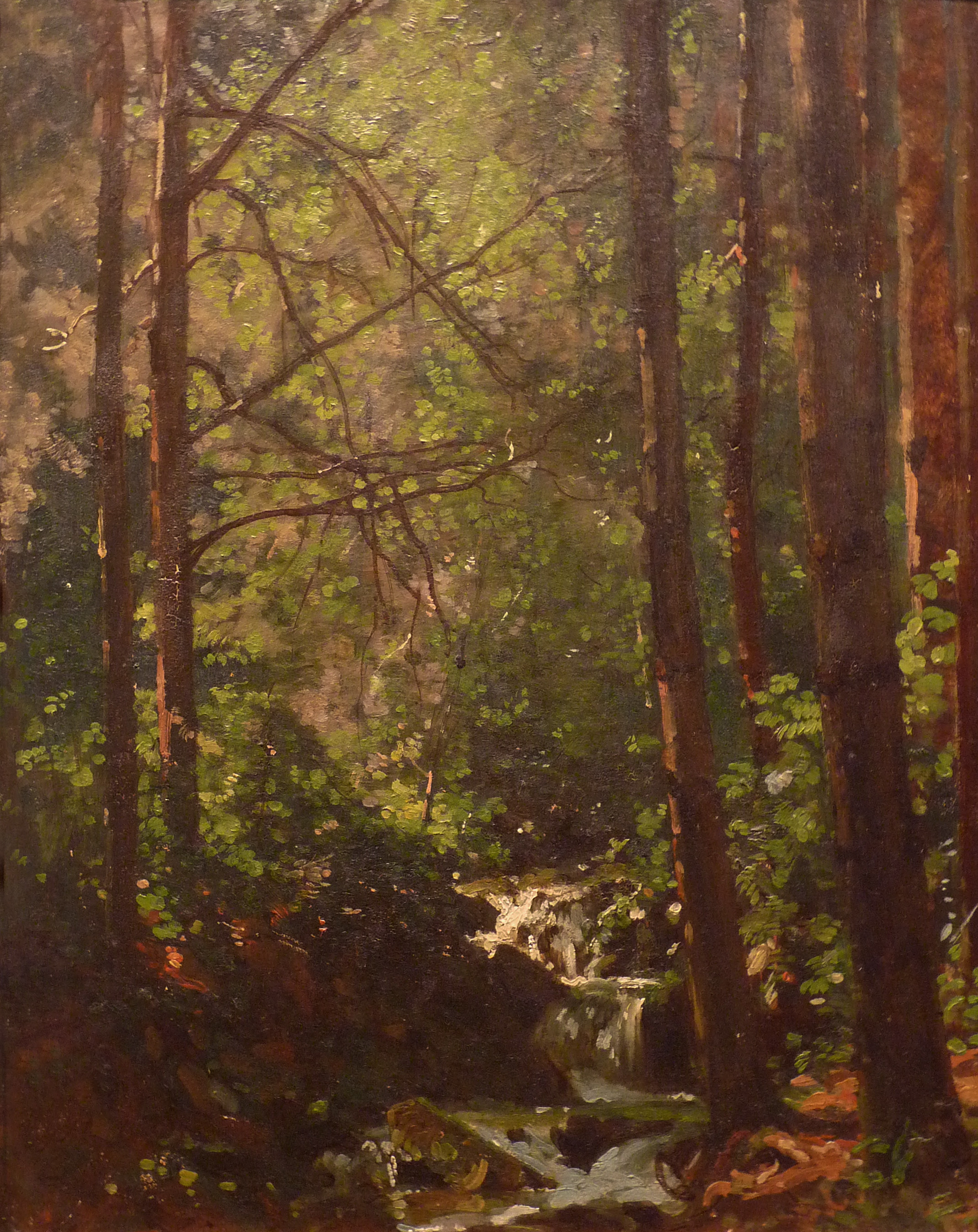
Cascade du Gehard (Vosges)

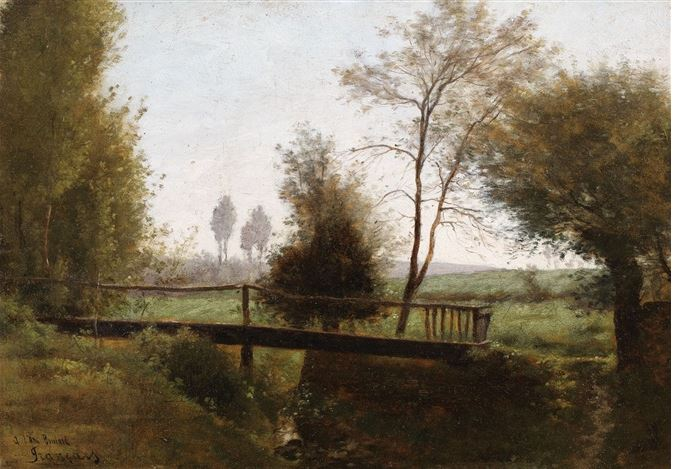
Dimineață la Barbizon (In the morning at Barbizon) (c 1850)

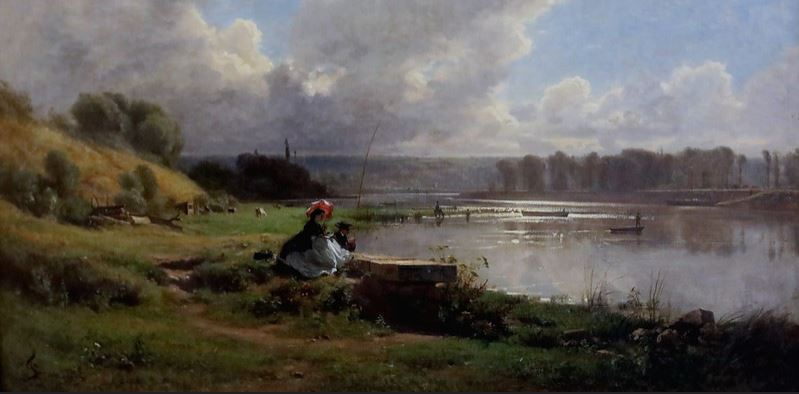
Au bord de l'eau, environs de Paris (By the water's edge, near Paris) (1861).

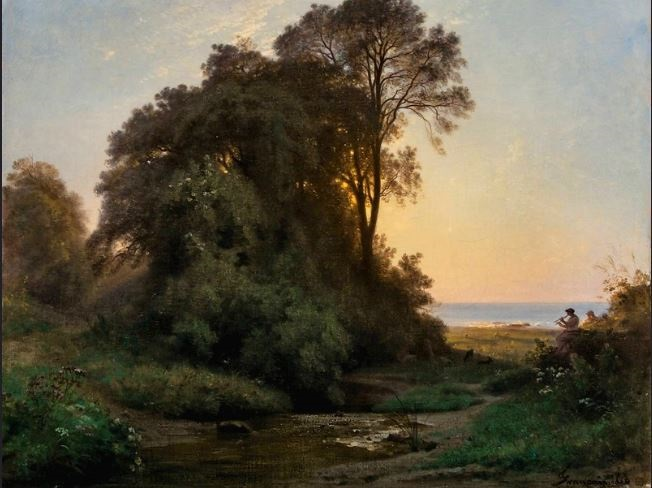
Musique Champetre (1863)

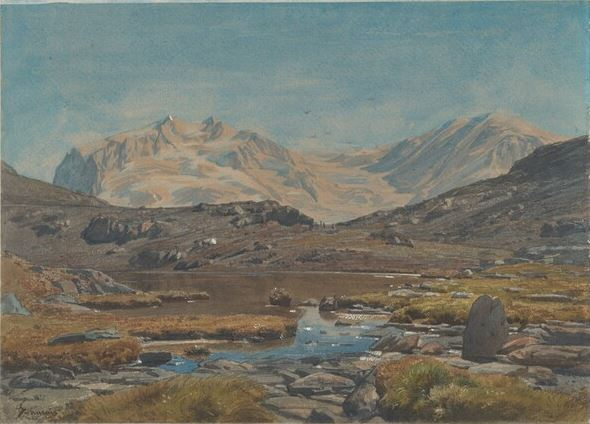
Mountain Stream, watercolour (c1865).

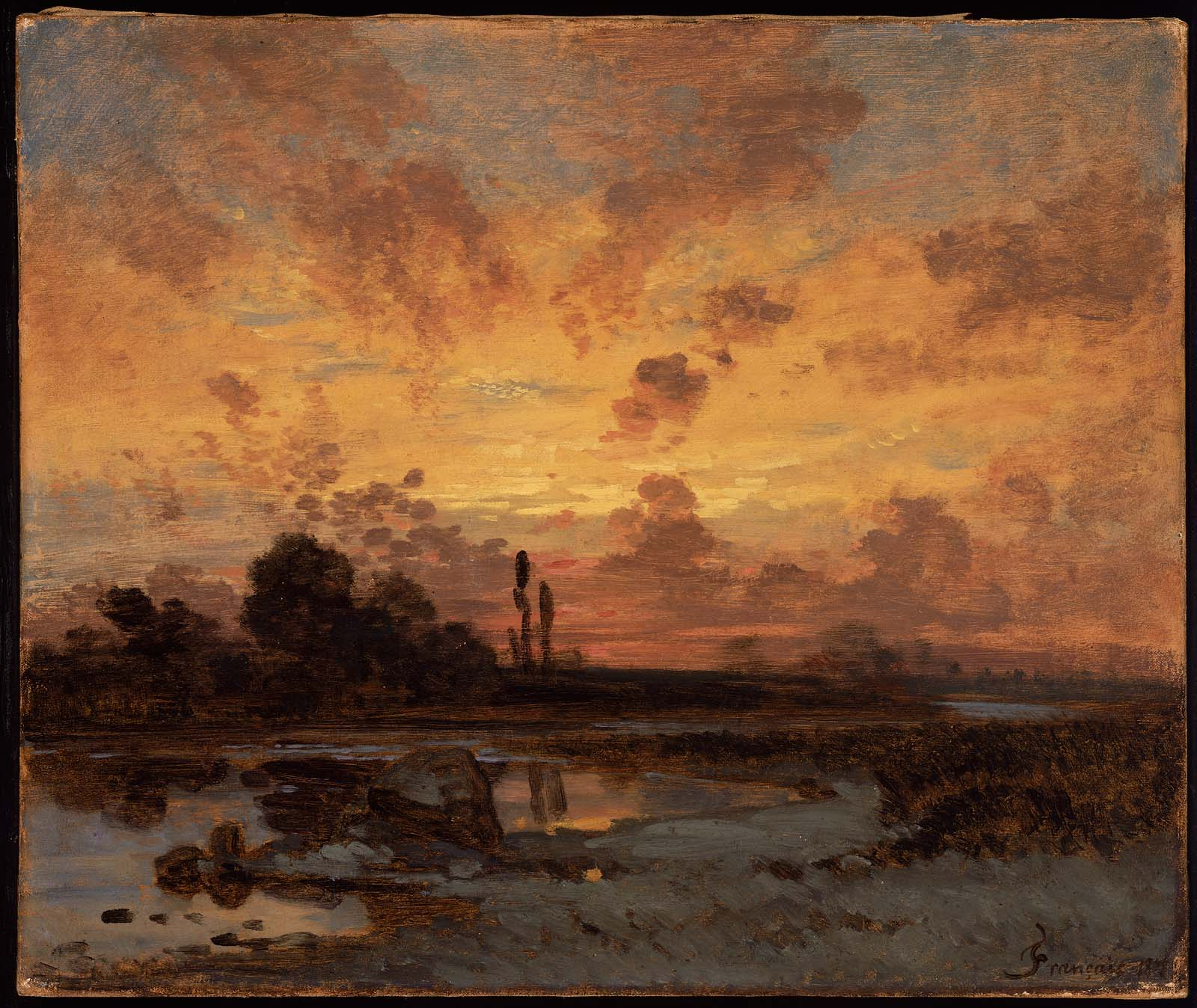
Sunset (1878)

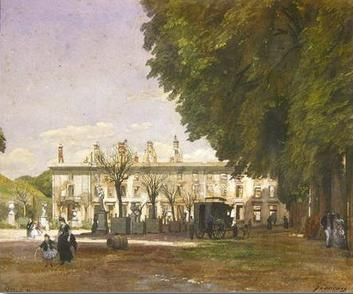
The ruins of Saint Cloud (1871)

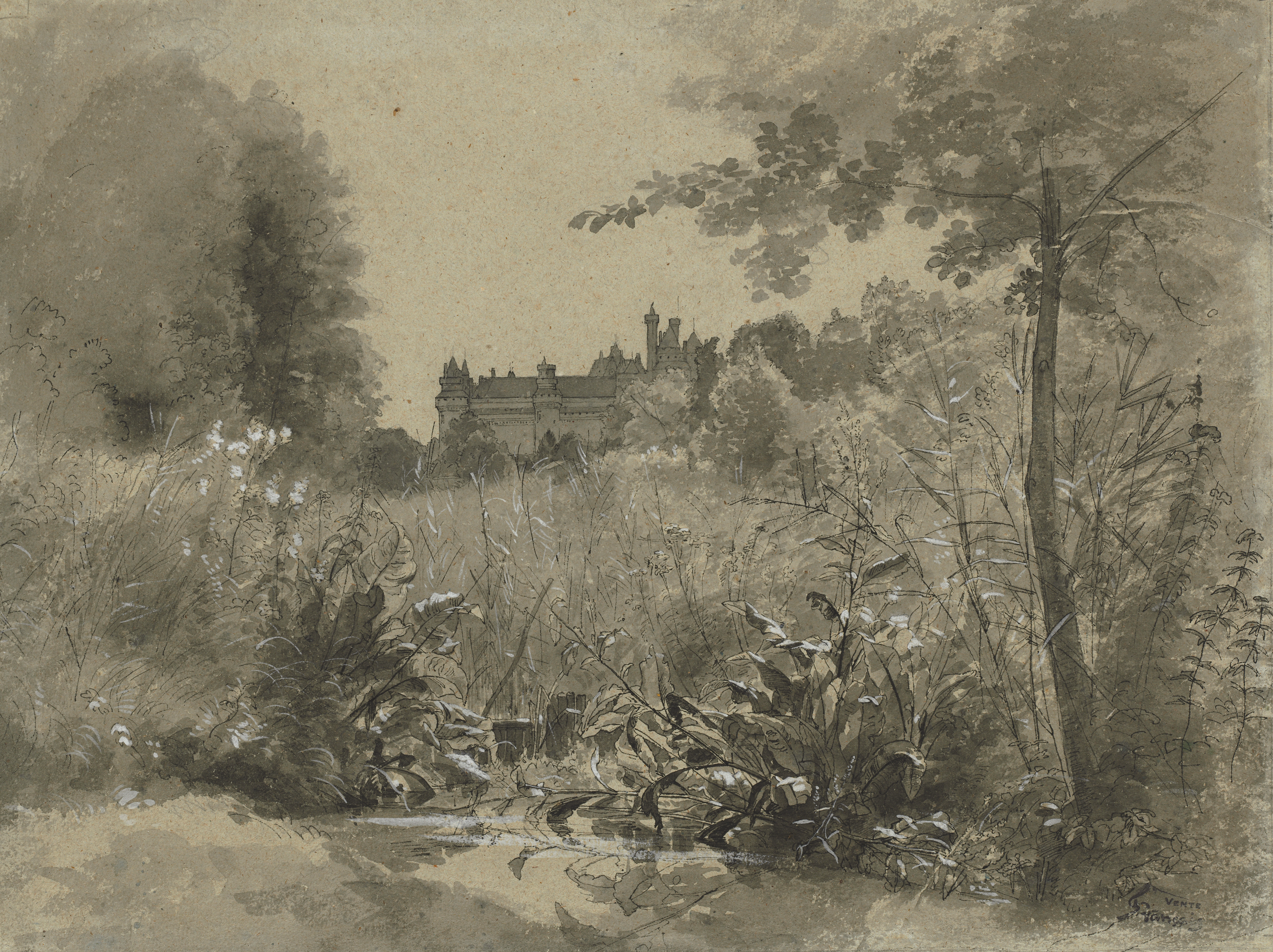
View of the Château of Pierrefonds (c 1870)

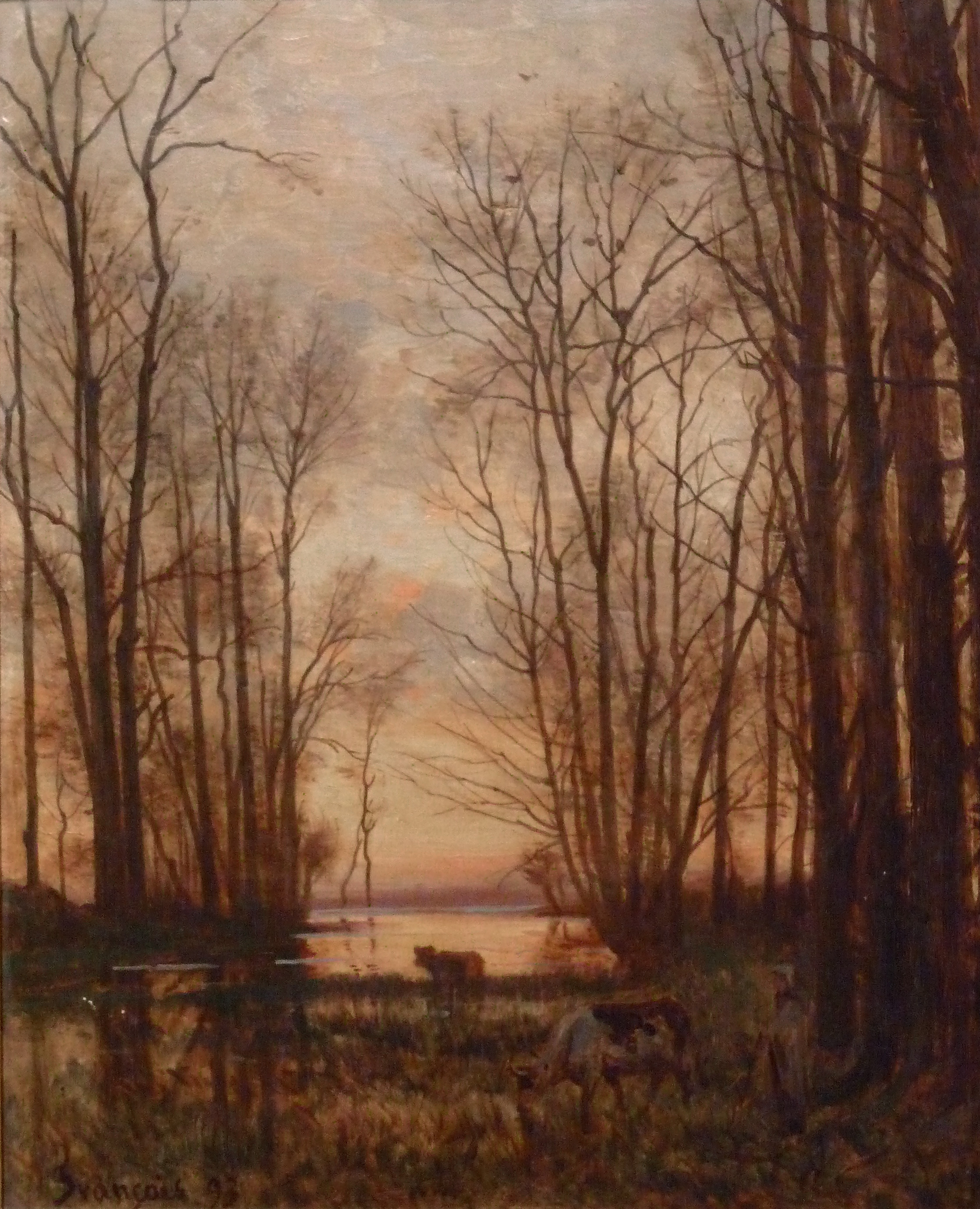
Crépuscule

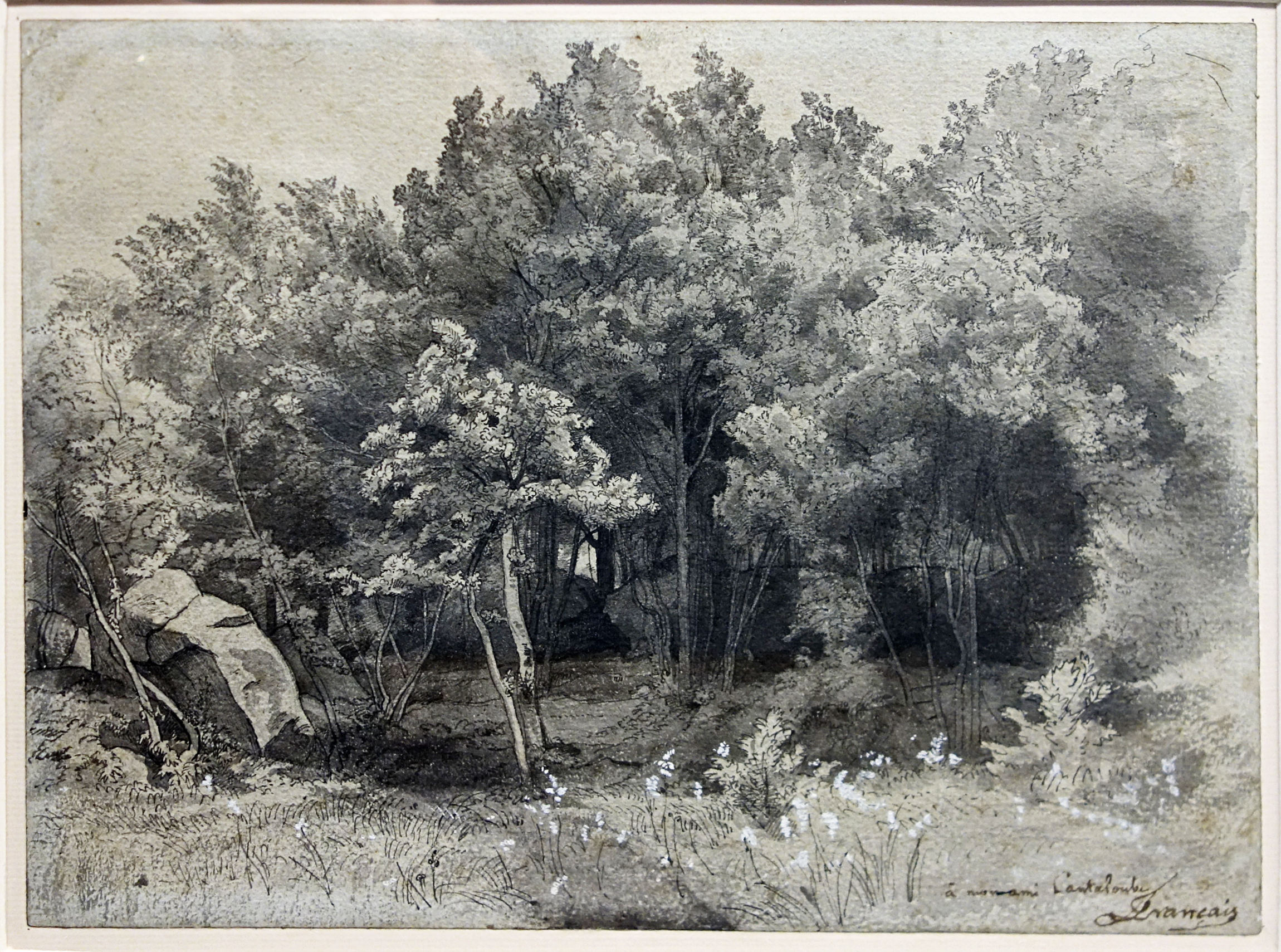
Drawing for le Bois-sacré

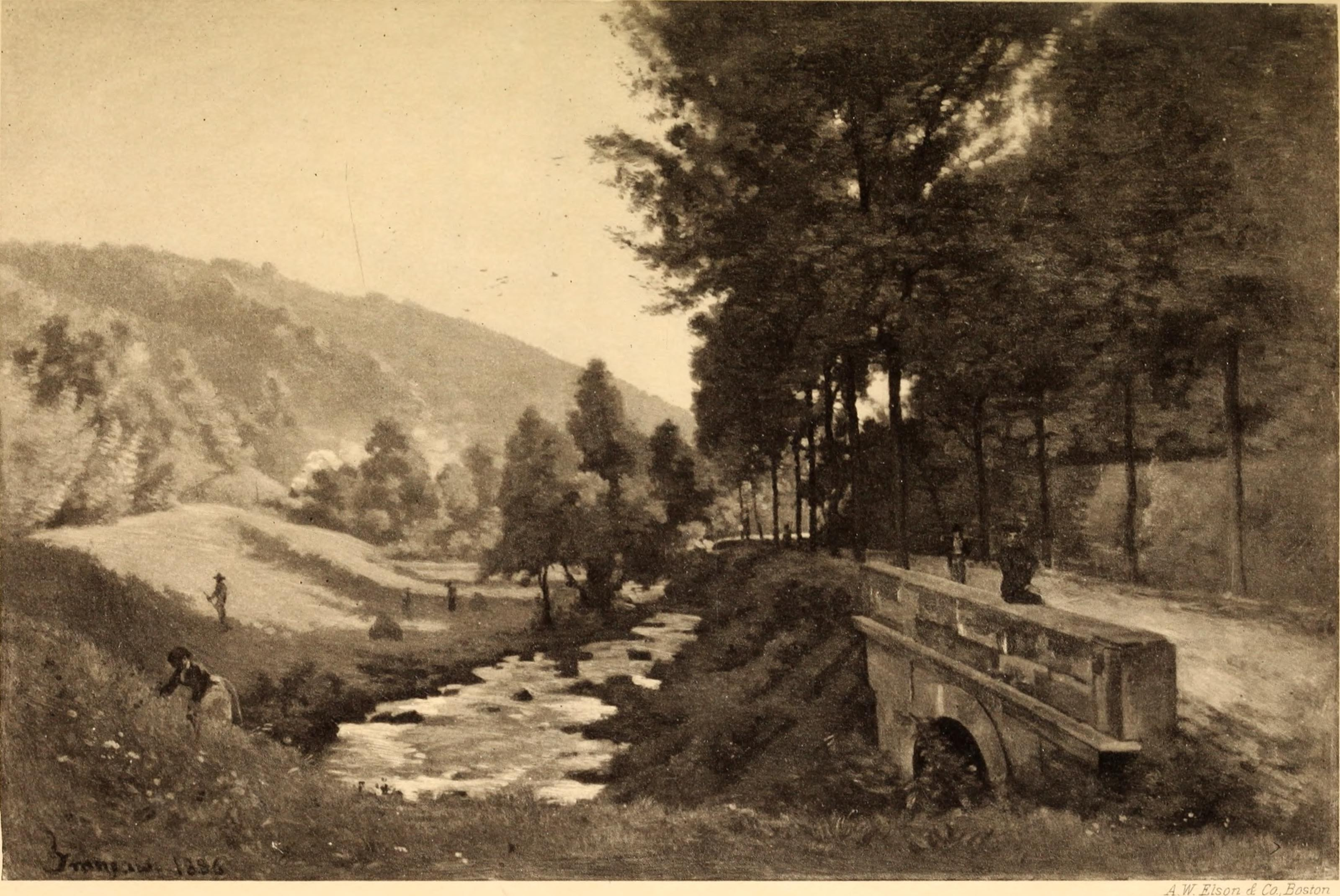
Environs de Plombières (1903)

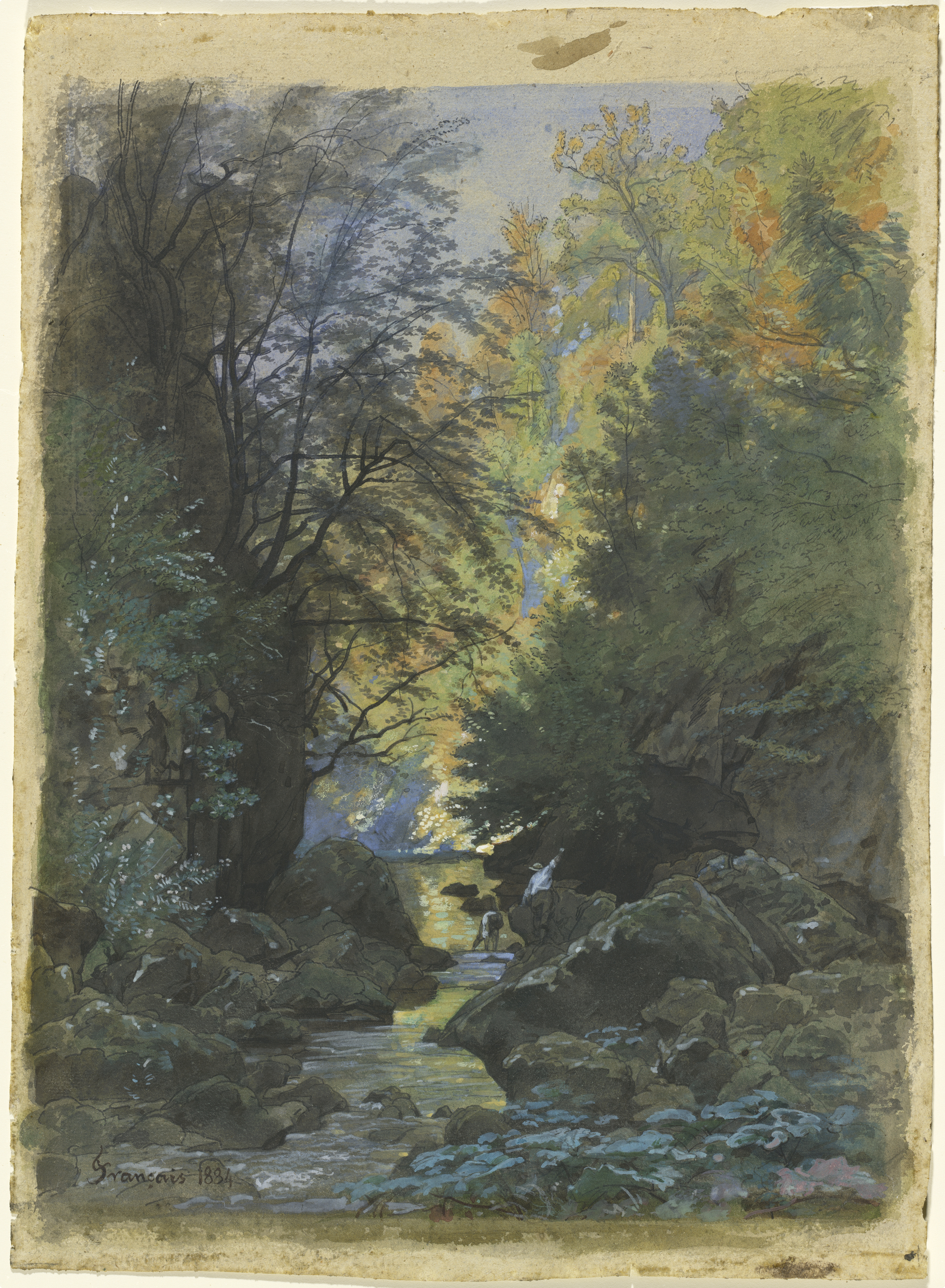
Un ruisseau à travers une forêt dense (1884) watercolour.

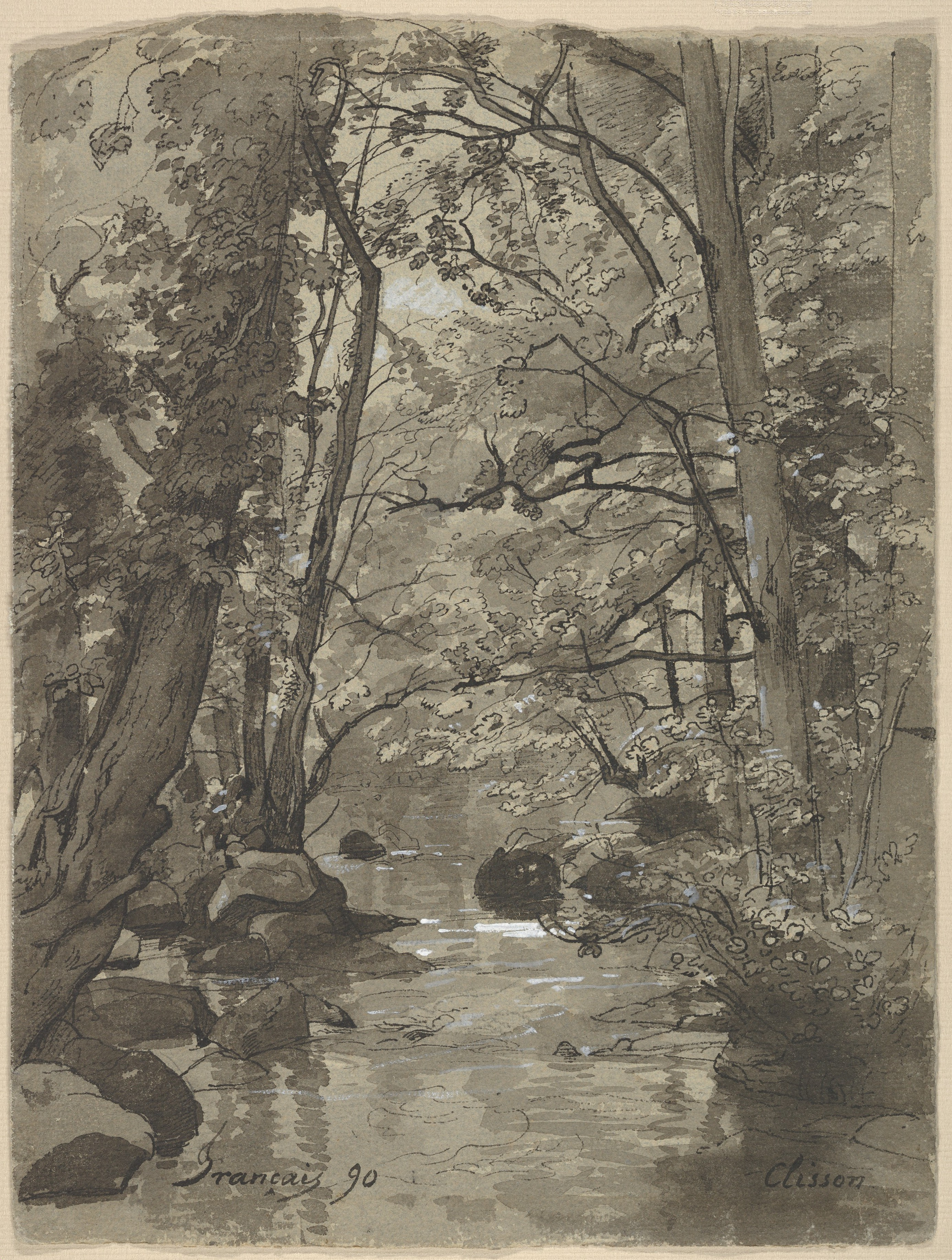
Forêt à Clisson (1890)

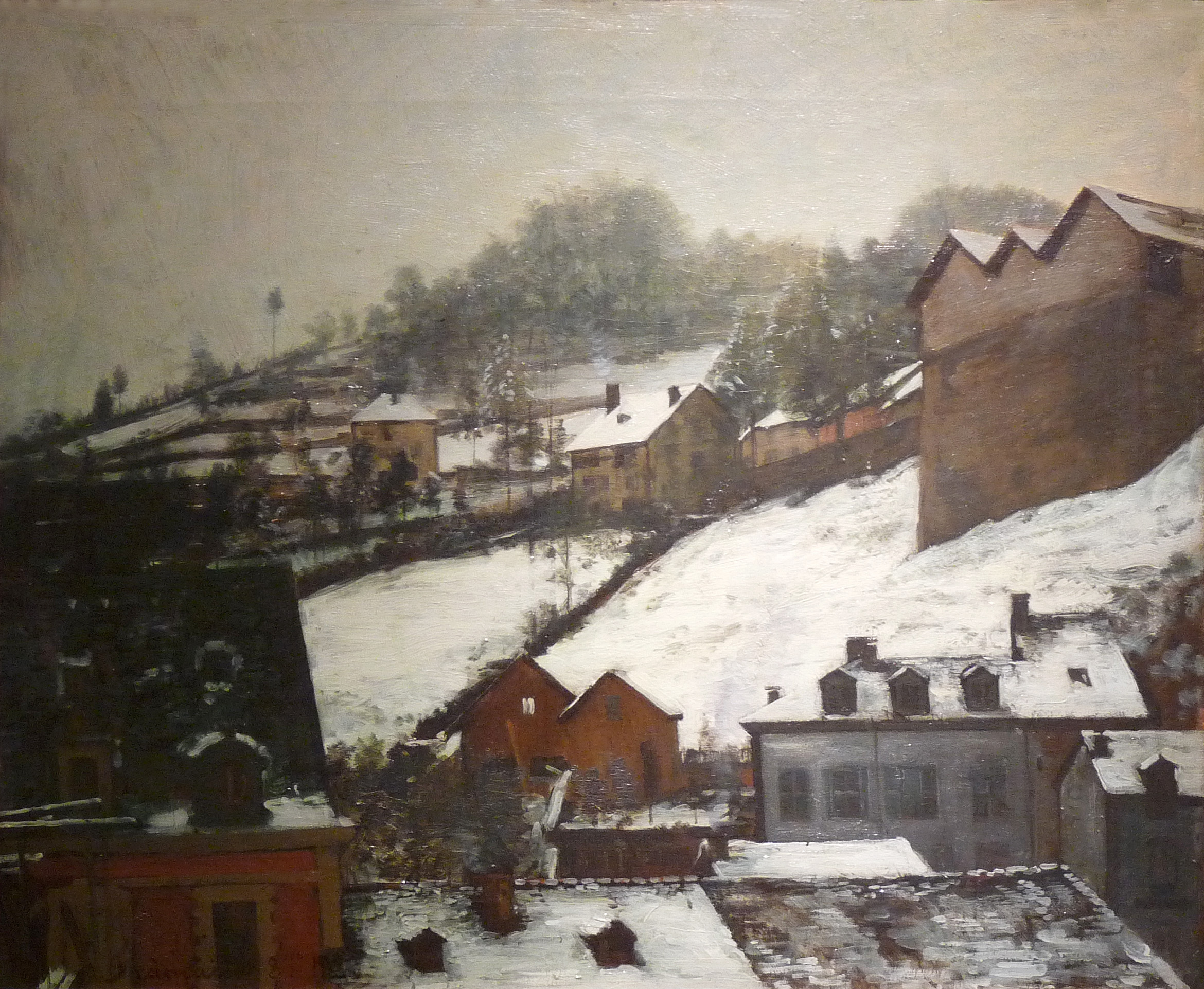
Plombières in Winter (1890)

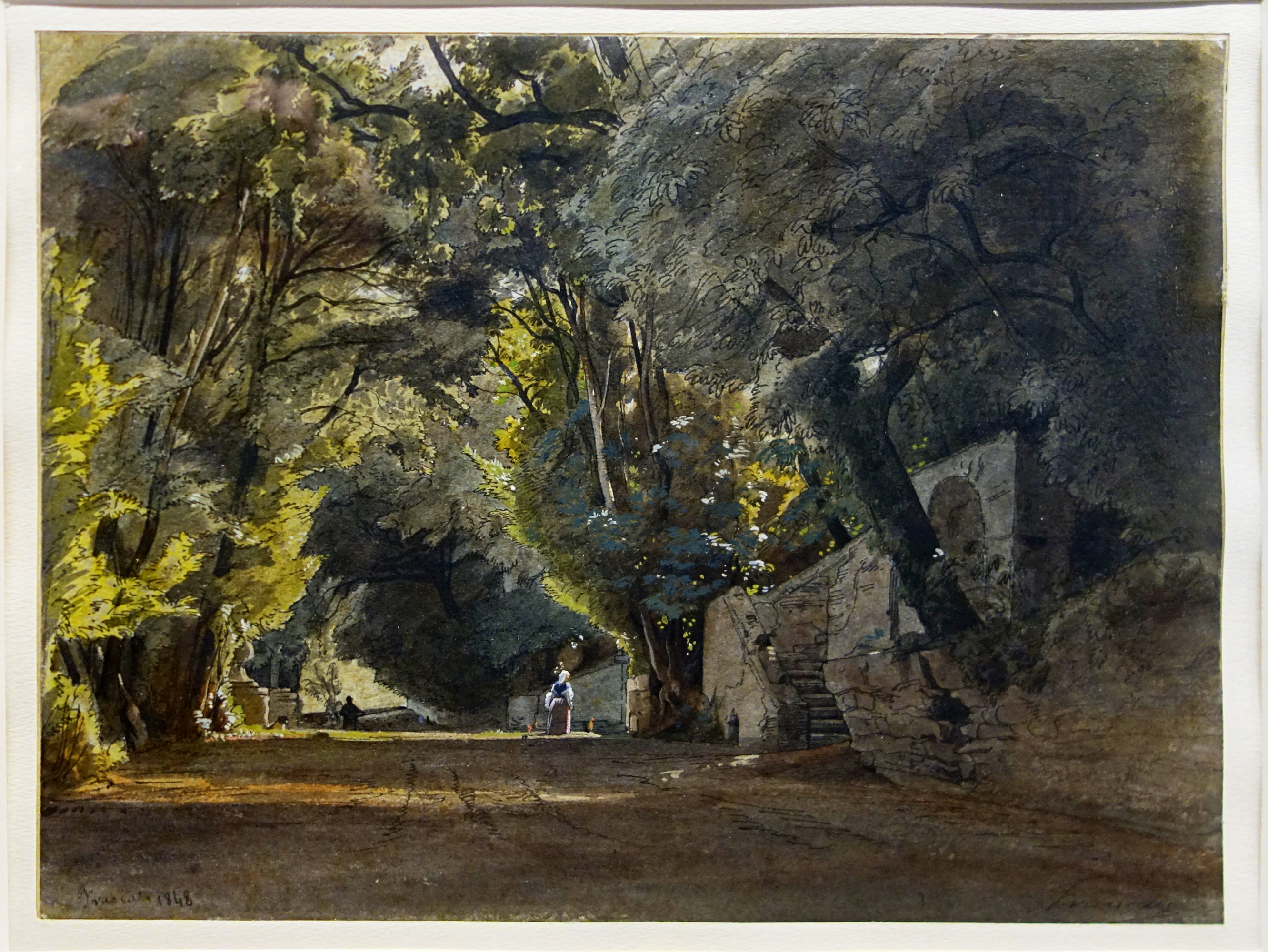
Vue prise à Frascati

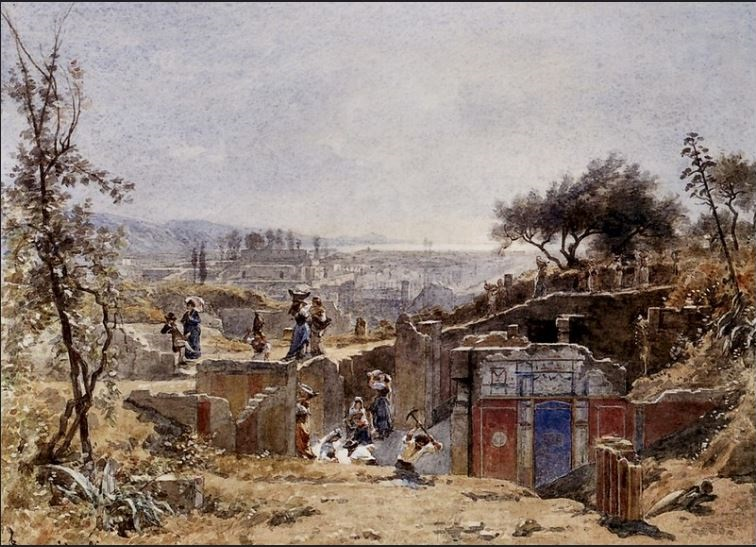
Excavations at Pompeii, watercolour (1886).

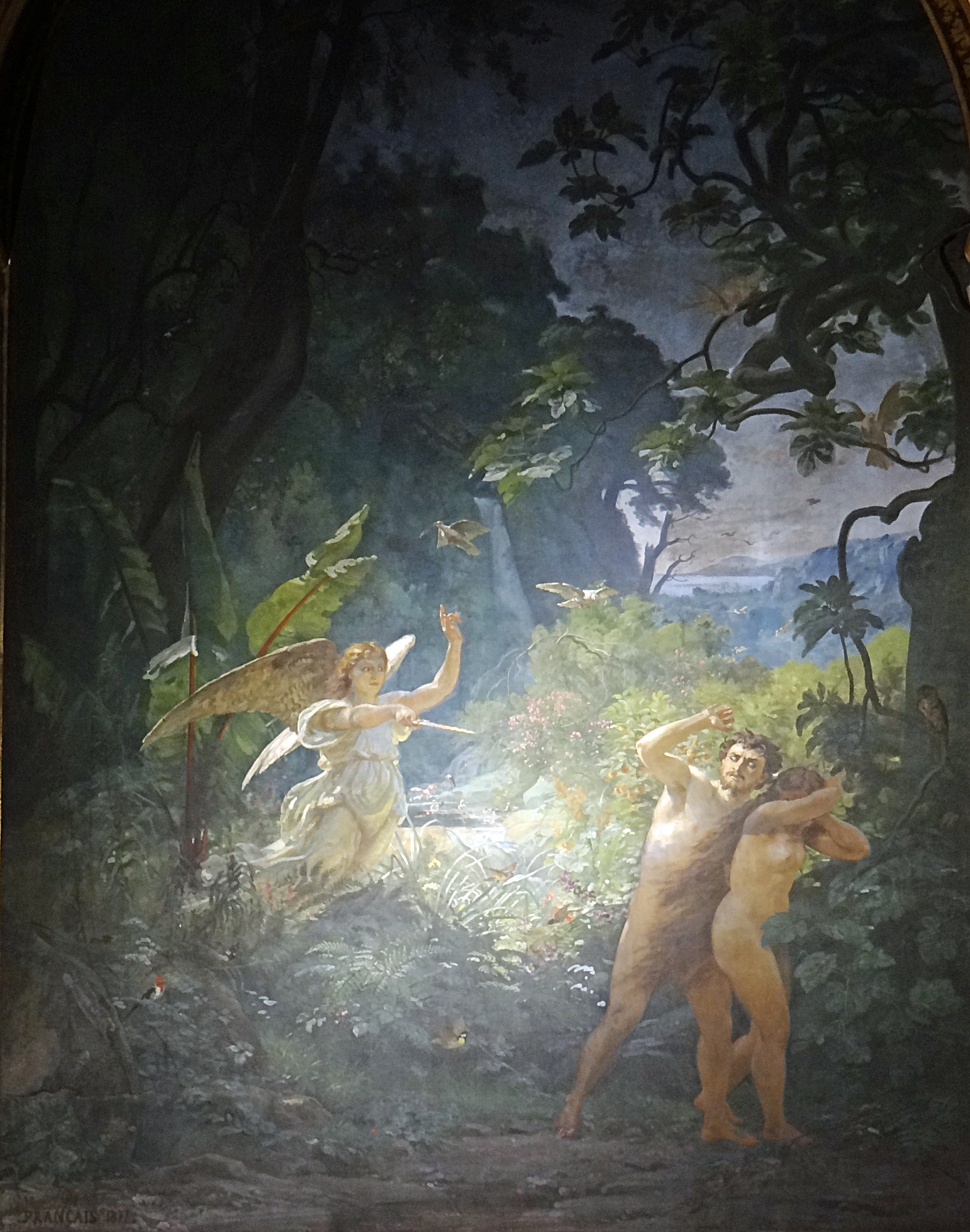
Church of la Sainte-Trinité, Paris - Baptistère (font) : Adam et Ève chassés du Paradis (Adam and Eve banished from Paradise)

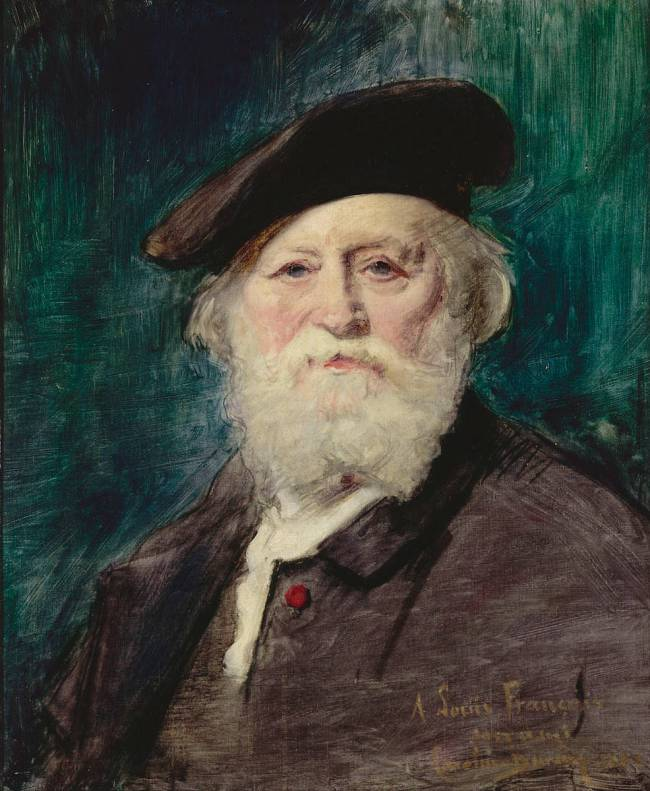
Portrait by Carolus-Duran (1888)

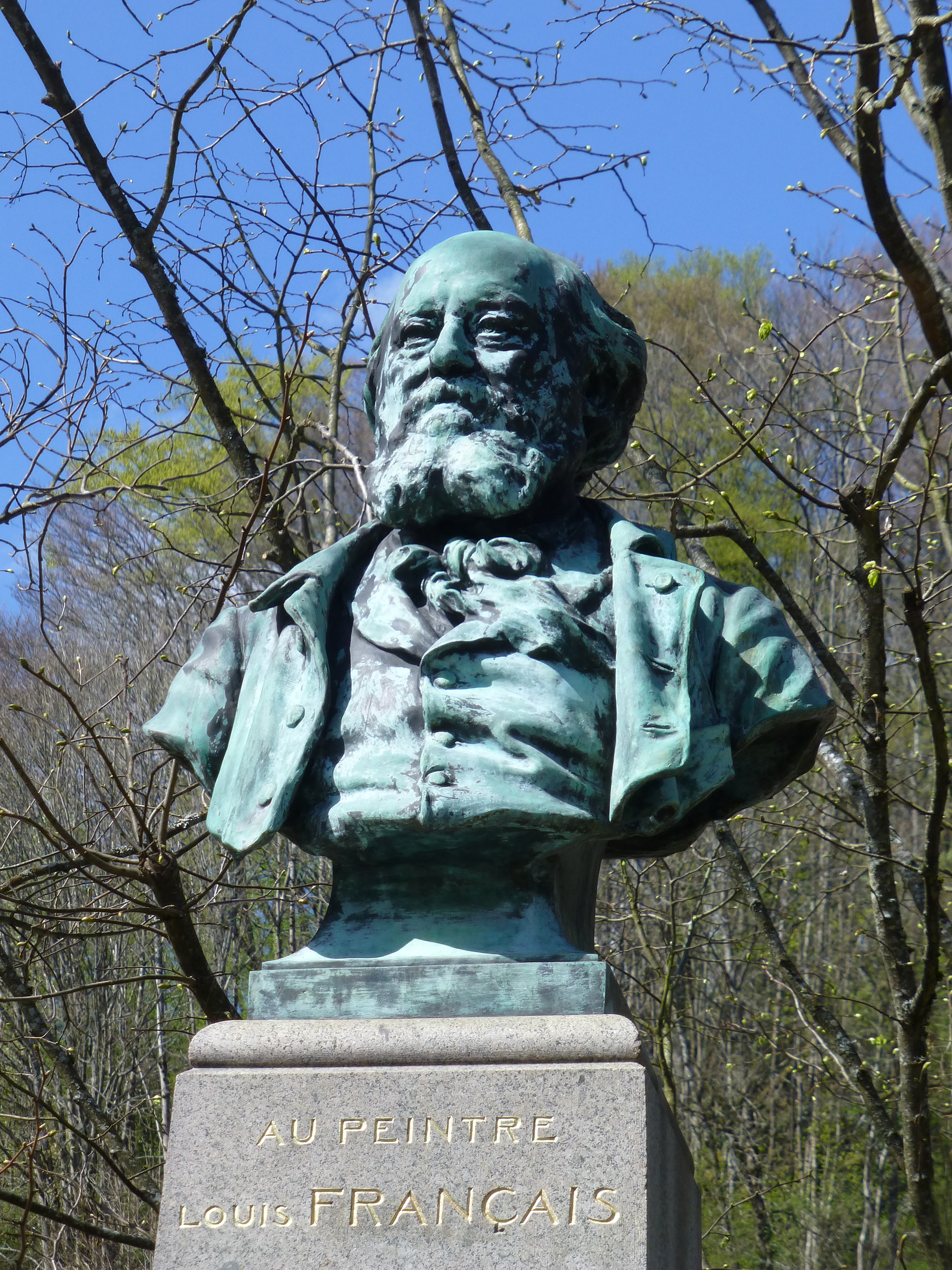
Monument in bronze at Plombières-les-Bains (Vosges) by Émile Peynot
