= Henri Baron =

French painter, engraver and illustrator (1816–1885)

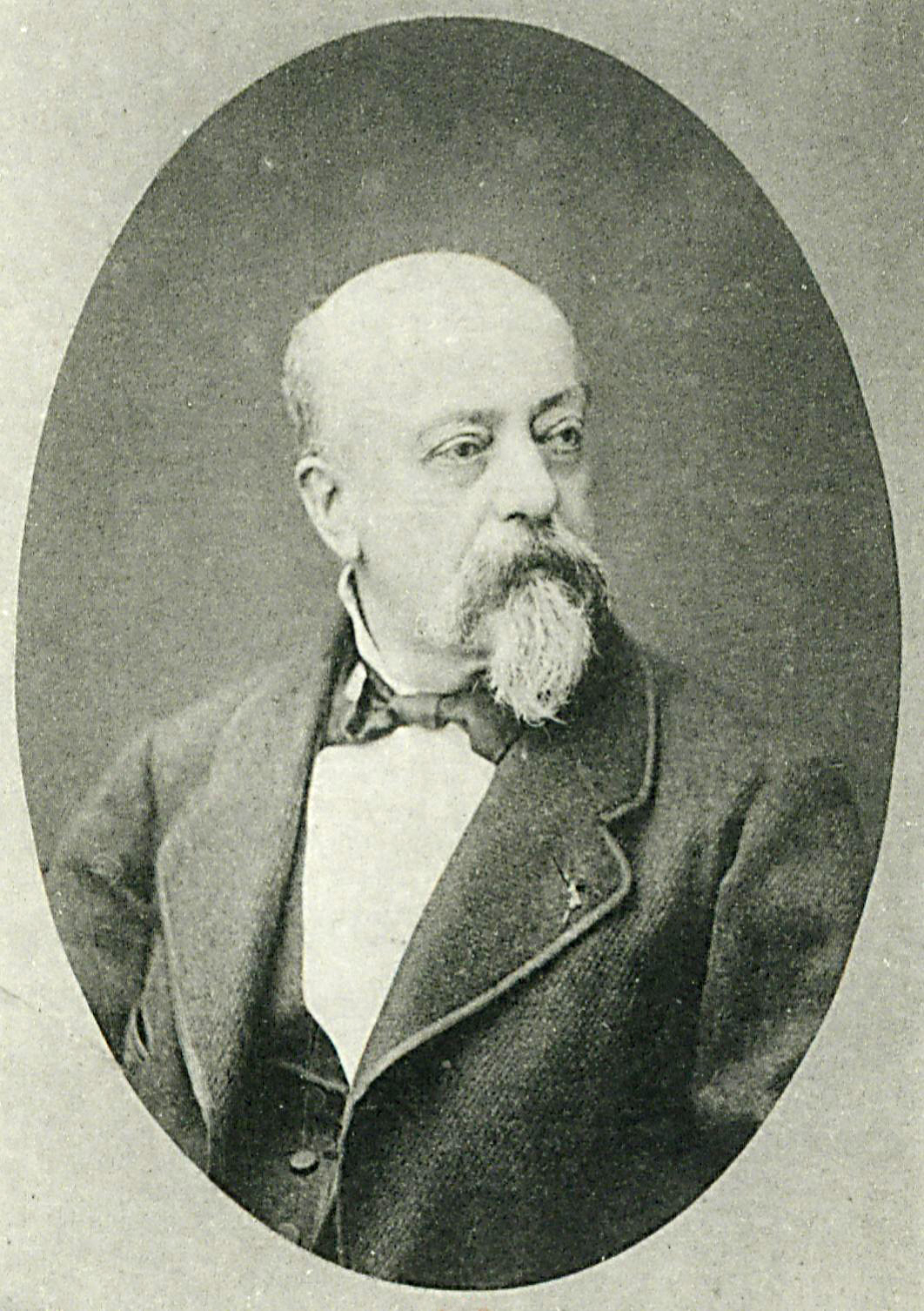
Henri Baron, from Alexandre Estignard, H. Baron : sa vie, ses œuvres

Henri Charles Antoine Baron (23 June 1816, in Besançon – 11 September 1885, in Geneva) was a French genre painter, engraver and illustrator.

== Biography ==
He studied art with Jean Gigoux, who heavily influenced his work. His debut at the Salon came at the Salon of 1840. He would exhibit there frequently and win numerous medals. In 1846, the Duke of Aumale commissioned him to paint a decorative panel, depicting Chantilly in the 16th century, for the Duke's room at the Château de Chantilly. Four years later, his painting of a scene from the ballet Les Noces de Gamache, by Louis Milon, was purchased by the state. His regular trips to Italy inspired many of his works.

In 1852, he married Octavie Bovy, daughter of the Swiss sculptor and engraver, Antoine Bovy. As a result of this familial connection, he was hired to participate in the restoration of the decorations at the Château de Gruyères (Canton de Fribourg).

He was also a regular participant of the Salon in Lyon. After 1862, he was an active member of the Société des amis des arts. Five years later, the Empress Eugénie commissioned him to portray the festival at the Palais des Tuileries that was held during the Exposition Universelle. This was presented at the Salon of 1868. His painting, "The Winter", was part of a major exhibit at the Exposition Universelle of 1878.

He was a regular collaborator with François-Louis Français and, together, they founded the revue Les artistes contemporains. He, Français, Gigoux and Célestin Nanteuil were co-creators of many compositions, notably for the lithography workshop and publishing firm of Bertauts.

Shortly after being named a Chevalier in the Legion of Honor, he died in Geneva, where he had maintained a part-time home since his marriage.

His brother, Jules-Aimable Baron (1814-1899), was also a designer and lithographer.

== Selected paintings ==
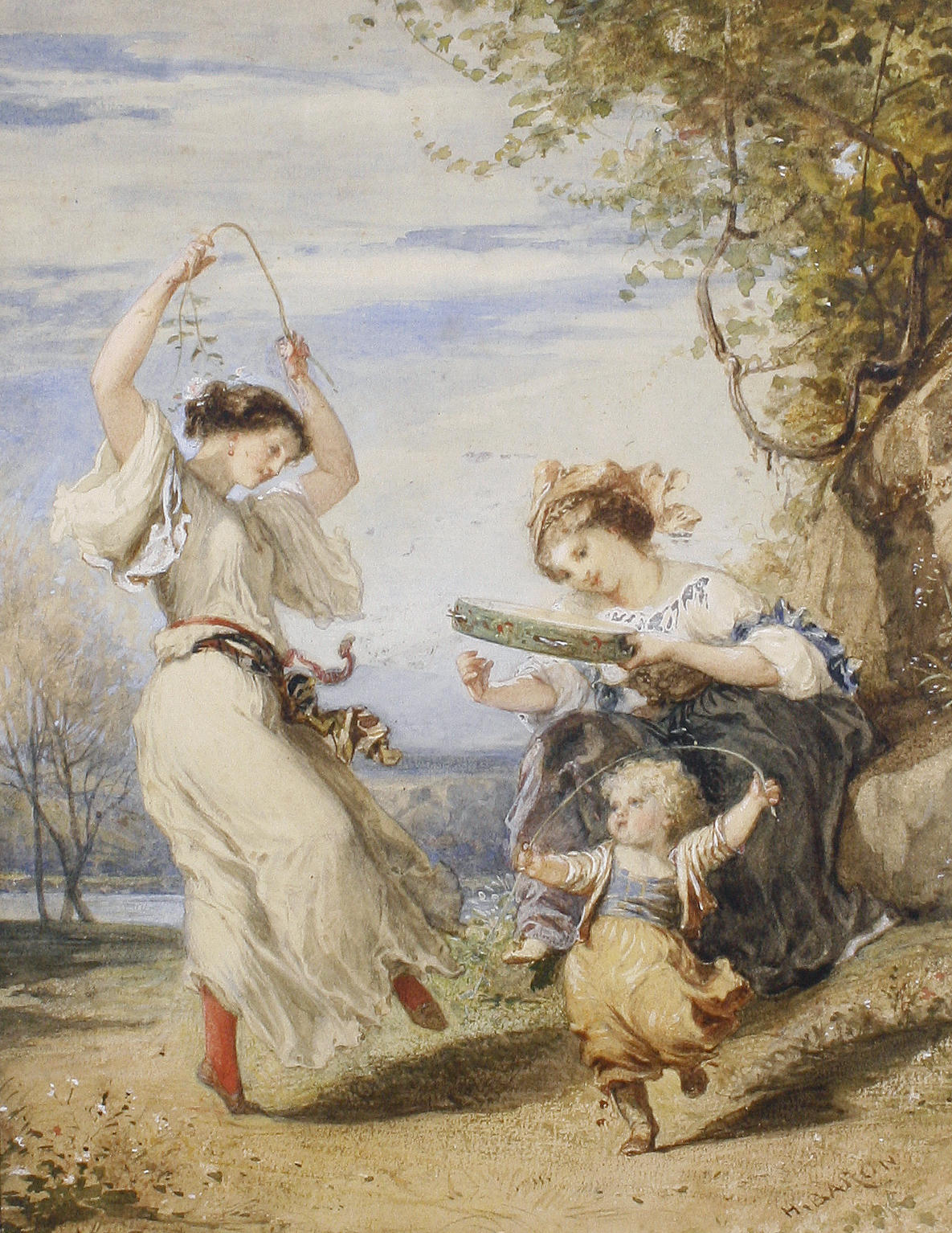
Italian Women, Dancing

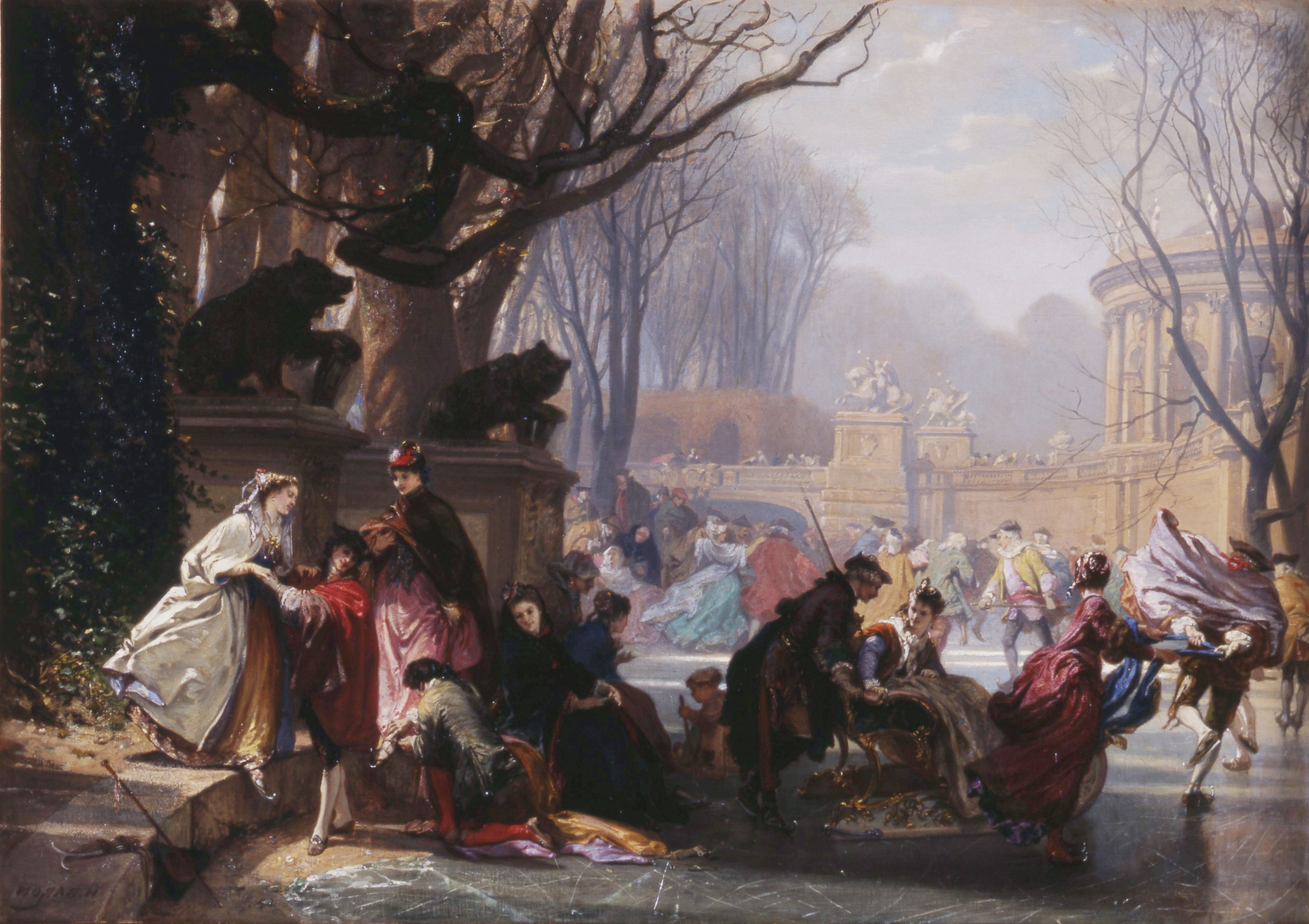
The Skaters

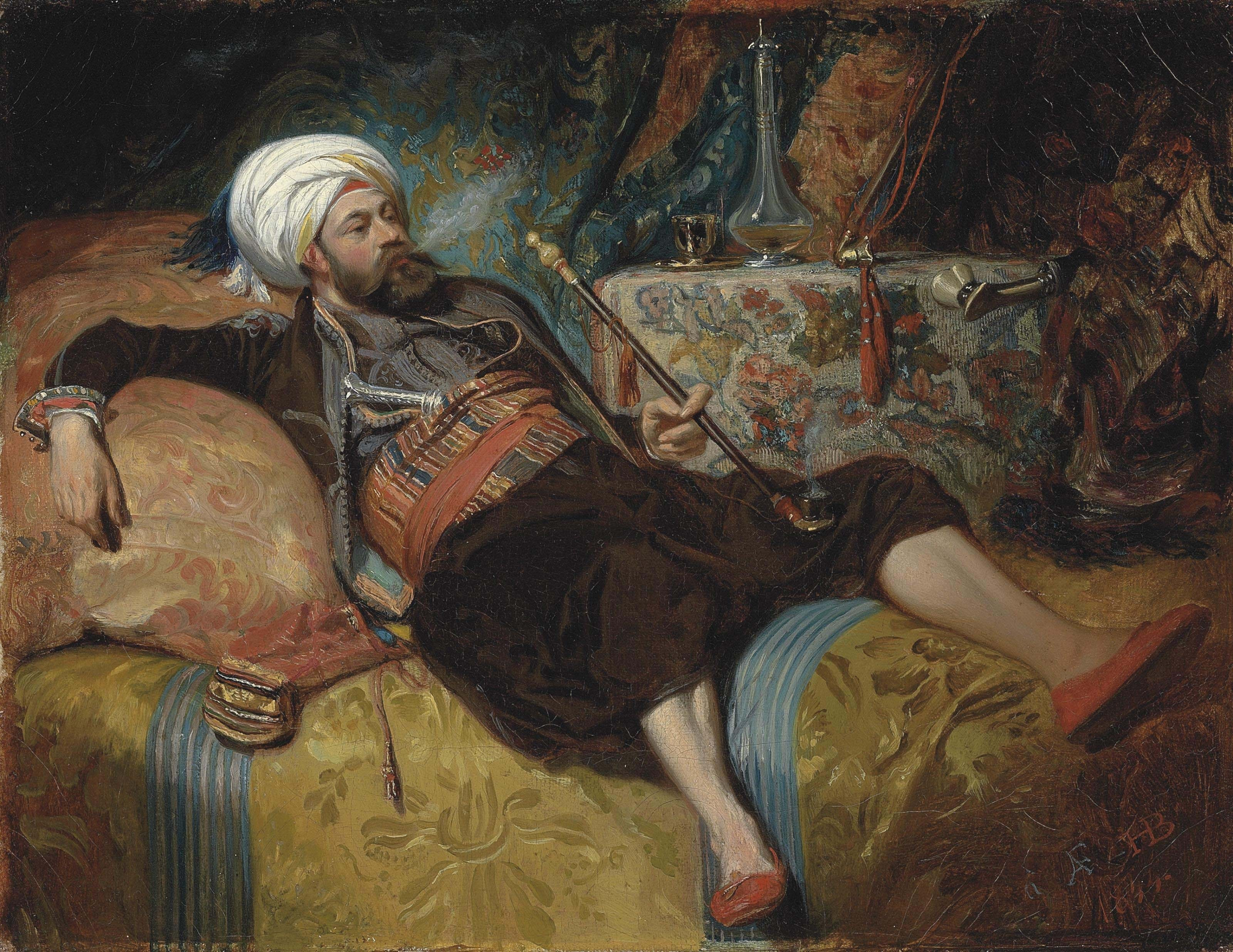
Reclining Turk,
Smoking a Hookah

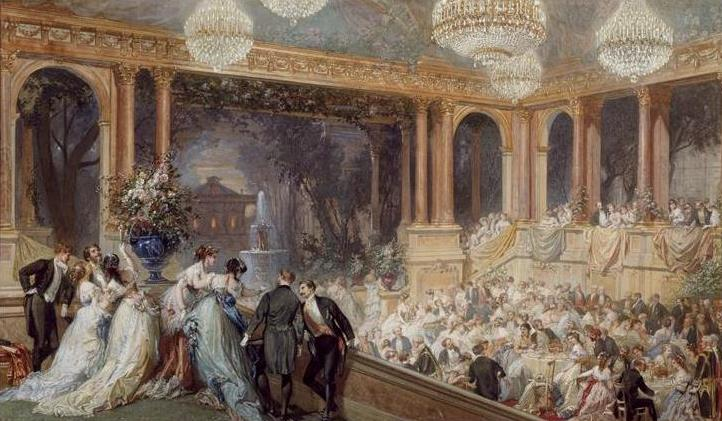
Dinner at the Tuileries

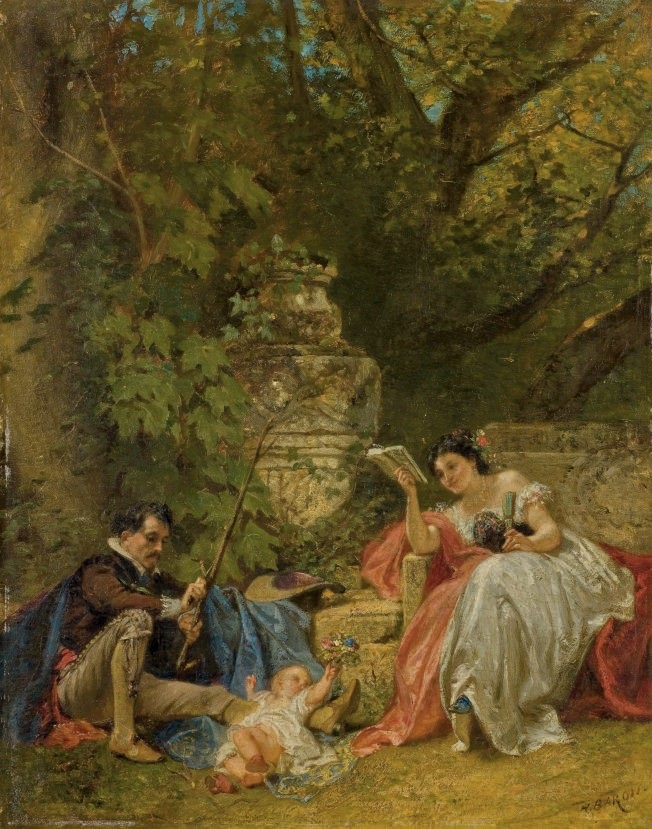
Insouciance
