= Al-Zubayr (disambiguation) =

Al-Zubayr, Al-Zubair, Az-Zubayr or Az-Zubair may refer to:

== People ==
- Zubayr ibn al-Awwam (594–656), Arab military commander of the Rashidun Caliphate and cousin of Muhammad
- al-Zubayr ibn Abd al-Muttalib, founder of the Hilf al-Fudul and an uncle of Muhammad
- Abd Allah ibn al-Zubayr (624–692) was an Arab military commander and the leader of a rebellion against the Umayyad Caliphate
- Urwa ibn al-Zubayr (died 713), Muslim historian and one of The Seven Fuqaha of Medina
- al-Zubayr ibn Bakkar (788–870), Arab historian and genealogist
- Aḥmad ibn al-Zubayr (fl. 1052–1071), Egyptian historian
- al-Zubayr Rahma Mansur (c. 1830–1913), Sudanese slave trader and a pasha of Bahr el Ghazal under the Khedivate of Egypt
- Rabih az-Zubayr (c. 1842–1900), Sudanese warlord and slave trader
- Ahmed al-Zubair al-Senussi (born 1934), Libyan politician and prince of the Senussi house
- Zubair Mohamed Salih (1944–1998), former Sudanese Vice President and soldier
- Nabila al-Zubayr (born 1964), Yemeni poet and novelist

== Places ==
- Al-Zubair District, a district in Basra Governorate, Iraq
  - Az Zubayr, the capital of Al-Zubair District
- Zubair Group, a group of volcanic islands belonging to Yemen
- Az Zubair Field, an oil field in southern Iraq

== Other uses ==
- Al-Zubair SC, an Iraqi football club
- Al-Zubair I, a Sudanese main battle tank based on the Type 59
- Al-Zubair II, a Sudanese main battle tank based on the Type 59D

== See also ==
- Zubayr (disambiguation)
- Zubayr (name)
- Al-Zubara
- Khor Al Zubair, a city in Basra Governorate, Iraq
- Deim Zubeir, a town in Lol State, South Sudan
- Bait Al Zubair, a museum in Muscat, Oman
- Bani Az Zubayr, a village in Sana'a Governorate, Yemen
