= Zubair =

Zubair or Zubayr may refer to:

== Places ==
- Al-Zubair District, a district in Basra Governorate, Iraq
  - Az Zubayr, the capital of Al-Zubair District
  - Az Zubair Field, oilfield
- Deim Zubeir, a town in Lol State, South Sudan
- Zubair Group, a group of volcanic islands belonging to Yemen

== People ==
- Zubayr ibn al-Awwam (594–656), Arab Muslim military commander
- Zubair (name)
- Zubairi, a family name in South Asia and the Middle East

== See also ==
- Al-Zubayr (disambiguation)
- Zuber (disambiguation)
