= Zubayr (name) =

- Pronunciation: Arabic: [zu.bajr]
- Gender: Male

Origin
- Origin: Arabic
- Meaning: "brave" or "strong"
- Region of origin: Arabia

Zubayr (Arabic: زُبَيْر; variants include Zobayer, Zubair, Zoubir, Zübeyir or Zuberi) is an Arabic masculine name and a surname from the root Z-B-R, meaning 'strong' or 'brave'.

== Given name ==
- Zubayr ibn ‘Abd al-Muttalib, founder of the Hilf al-Fudul and an uncle of Muhammad
- Zubayr ibn al-Awwam (594–656), Arab Muslim military commander
- Al-Zubayr ibn Bakkar (788–870), Arab historian
- Ahmed Al-Zubair al-Senussi (born 1934), a Libyan politician and prince of the Senussi house
- Zubair Ahmad Khan, living Pakistani academic and engineer
- Zubair Ali Zai (1957–2013), Pakistani scholar
- Zubayr Al-Rimi (1974–2003), Saudi Arabian terrorist
- Zubayr Amiri (born 1990), Afghan football player
- Zubayr Hamza (born 1995), South African cricketer
- Zubair Hoque (born 1996), British racing car driver
- Zubair Khan (Indian politician) (1963–2024), Indian politician
- Zubair Mahmood Hayat (born 1960), Pakistani army general
- Zubair Mohamed Salih (1944–1998), former Sudanese Vice President and soldier
- Al-Zubayr Rahma Mansur (1830–1913), Sudanese slave trader and pasha of the Egyptian Khedivate
- Zubair Shah (born 1977), Pakistani journalist
- Zubair Torwali, living Pakistani Dard community activist and educator
- Zubaira Tukhugov (born 1991), Russian professional mixed martial artist

== Surname ==
- Aasiya Zubair (1972–2009), American television executive
- Abd Allah ibn al-Zubayr (624–692), Arab military commander
- Amina Zoubir (born 1983), Algerian artist
- Mohammad Zubair Khan, Pakistani economist
- Mohammad Zubair (Pakistani cricketer), Rawalpindi cricketer
- Mohammed Zubair (journalist) (born 1983), Indian journalist and fact-checker
- Muhammad Zubair Umar also known as Mohammad Zubair, Pakistani politician
- Muhammad Zubair (field hockey) (born 1988), field hockey player
- Nabila al-Zubayr (born 1964), Yemeni writer
- Qasim Zubair (born 1987), Emirati cricketer
- Rabih az-Zubayr (1842–1900), Sudanese warlord
- Shafia Zubair (born 1967), Indian politician
- Urwah ibn Zubayr (644–713), Arab historian
- Zubairi, a family name in South Asia and the Middle East
  - Roohi Zuberi (born 1959), Indian politician
  - Itrat Husain Zuberi (1910–1964), Pakistani academic
  - Iqbal Zuberi (1932–2002), Pakistani journalist

== See also ==
- Al-Zubayr (disambiguation)
- Zubayr (disambiguation)
