= Zuber (surname) =

Zuber is a surname of German origin.

The surname Zuber originated from the Middle High German word zuber, meaning "(two-handled) tub", and thus is an occupational surname used for people working as a cooper or tubmaker.

In some cases, Zuber is a habitational surname derived from the Alemannic German word Zube ("fountain" or "well"), for a person living next to a well or a flowing stream of water.

== Notable people with the name ==
- Andreas Zuber (born 1983), Austrian race car driver
- Barbara Zuber (1926–2019), American painter and illustrator
- Bill Zuber (1913–1982), American baseball pitcher
- Catherine Zuber (born 1951), British costume designer
- Christian Joseph Zuber (1736–1802), Danish architect
- Edward Zuber (1932–2018), Canadian artist
- Eric Zuber (born 1985), American pianist
- Etta Zuber Falconer (1933–2002), American mathematician
- Feliks Żuber (1905–1940), Polish sprinter
- Fritz Zuber-Buhler (1822–1896), Swiss painter
- Henri Zuber (1844–1909), French landscape painter
- Henry Zuber III (born 1966), American politician
- Inês Zuber (born 1980), Portuguese politician and MEP
- Isaiah Zuber (born 1997), American football player
- Jean Zuber (1773–1852), French-Alsatian industralist
- Jean-Bernard Zuber, French theoretical physicist
- Jon Zuber (born 1969), American baseball player
- Marc Zuber (1944–2003), Indian actor
- Maria Zuber (born 1958), American astronomer
- Paul B. Zuber (1926–1987), American civil rights attorney
- Raphael Zuber (born 1973), Swiss architect
- Steven Zuber (born 1991), Swiss footballer
- Stanisław Zuber (1883–1947), Polish geologist
- Terence Zuber (born 1948), American historian
- Tom Zuber (born 1972), American attorney and entrepreneur
- Tyler Zuber (born 1995), American professional baseball player
- Véronique Zuber (1936–2024), French model and actress

== See also ==
- Zuber (disambiguation)
