= Zdravkovski =

Zdravkovski is a surname. Notable people with the surname include:

- Darko Zdravkovski (born 1970), Macedonian basketball player
- Davor Zdravkovski (born 1998), Macedonian footballer
- Petar Zdravkovski (1912–1967), Yugoslav educator, statesman and diplomat
