= Zuber =

Zuber may refer to:

== People ==
- Zuber (surname)
- Zuber K. Khan, Indian actor

== Places ==
- Zuber, Florida, United States
- Zuber Corners, Ontario, Canada

== See also ==
- Zubair (disambiguation)
- Zuberi, an Indian surname
- Zuber & Cie, wallpaper manufacturer
