= Pierre-Antoine Mongin =

French painter and engraver (1761-1827)

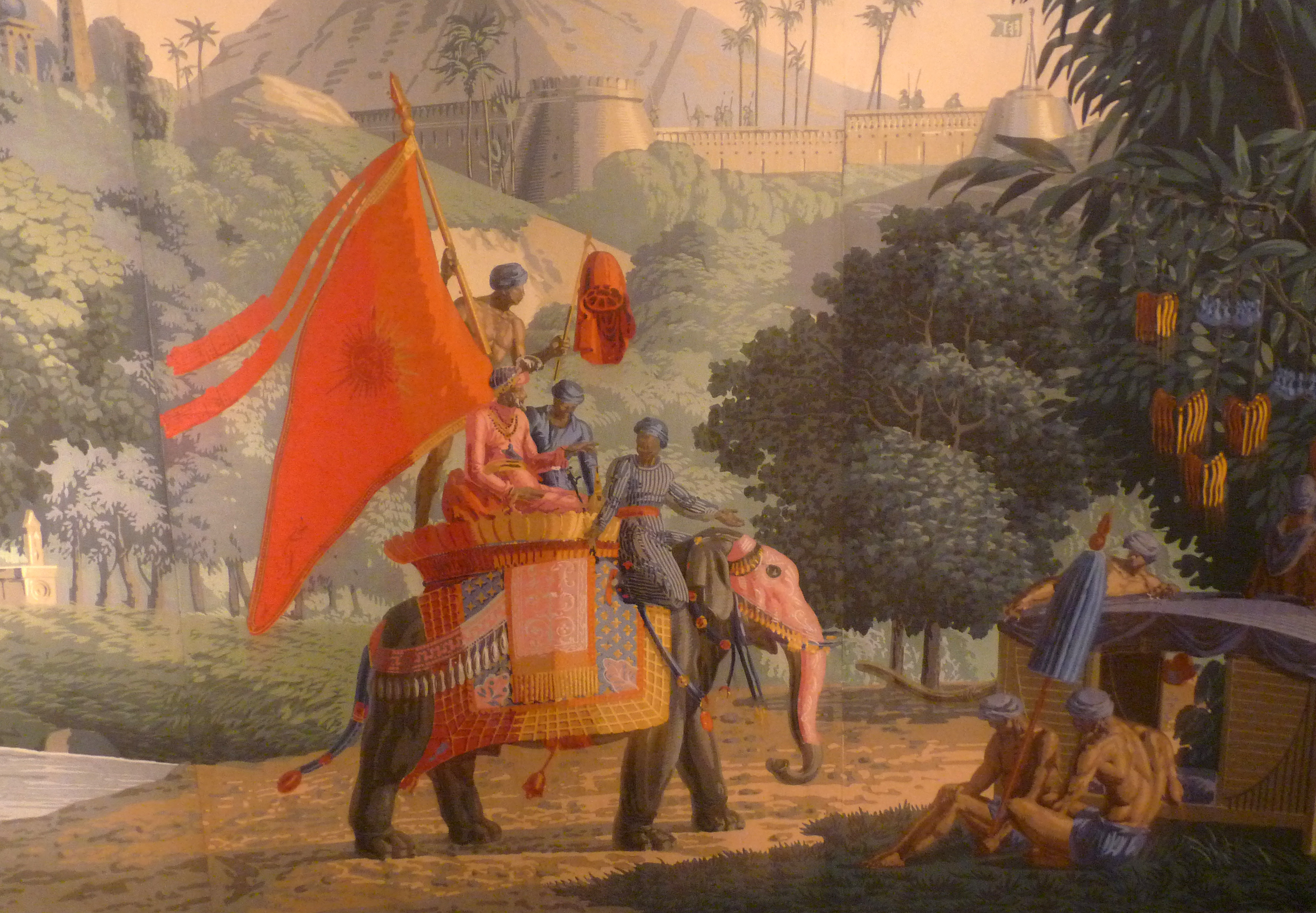
l'Hindustan wallpaper by Pierre-Antoine Mongin for Zuber et Cie. Detail.

Pierre Antoine Mongin, L'Hindoustan

Pierre-Antoine Mongin (1761 – 19 May 1827) was a French painter and engraver.

Mongin was the designer for the 1807 Zuber & Cie scenic wallpaper l'Hindoustan. In 2013, a part of his design for l'Hindoustan appeared on a postage stamp for the French Post.

His work is included in the permanent collections of the Art Institute of Chicago, the Cooper-Hewitt, Smithsonian Design Museum, and the Metropolitan Museum of Art.

== Gallery ==
Media related to Pierre-Antoine Mongin at Wikimedia Commons

Antoine Pierre Mongin, The Curious One

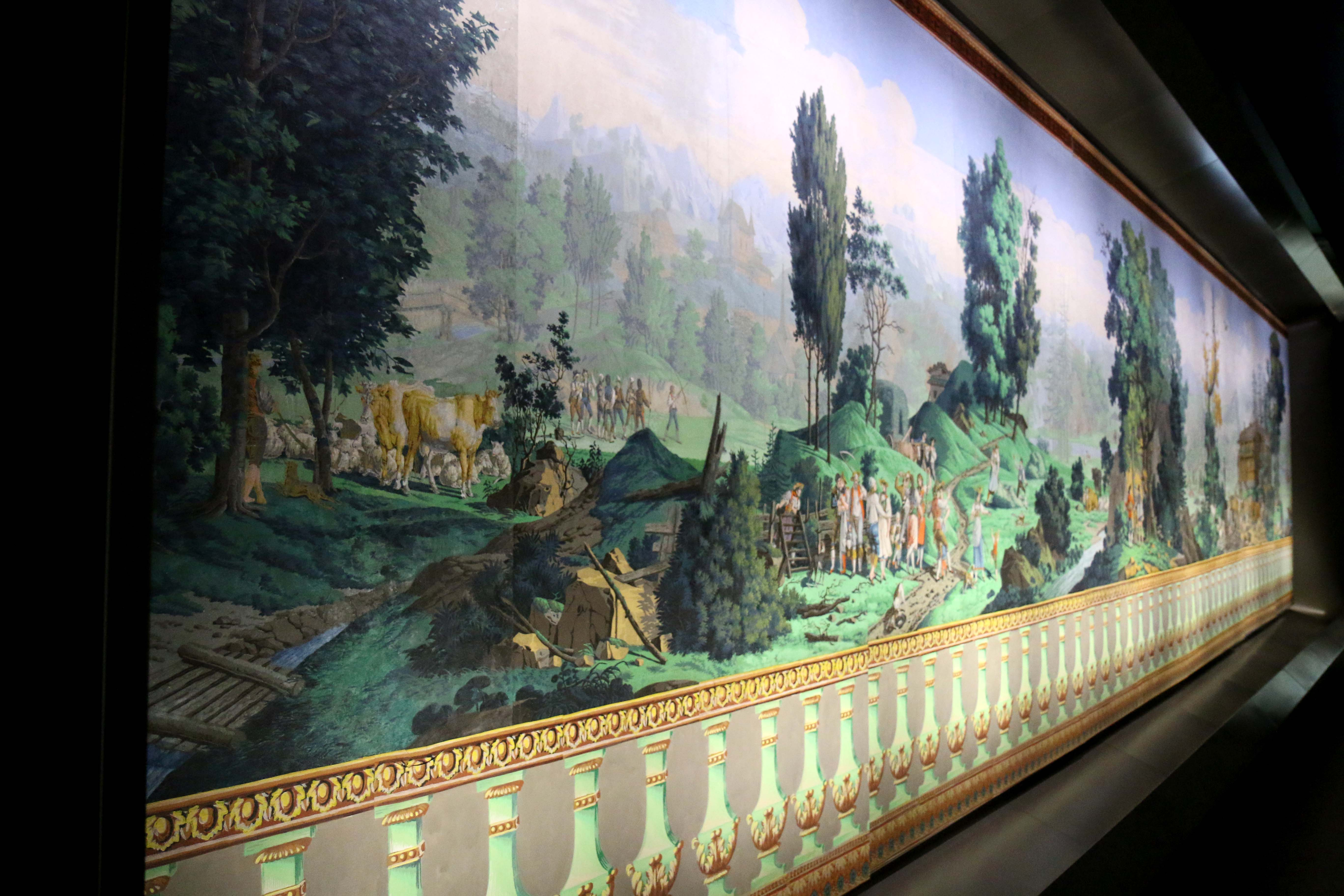
Scenic wallpaper by Mongin, in the Grande-Helvétie gallery at the chateau Borély, Marseille.

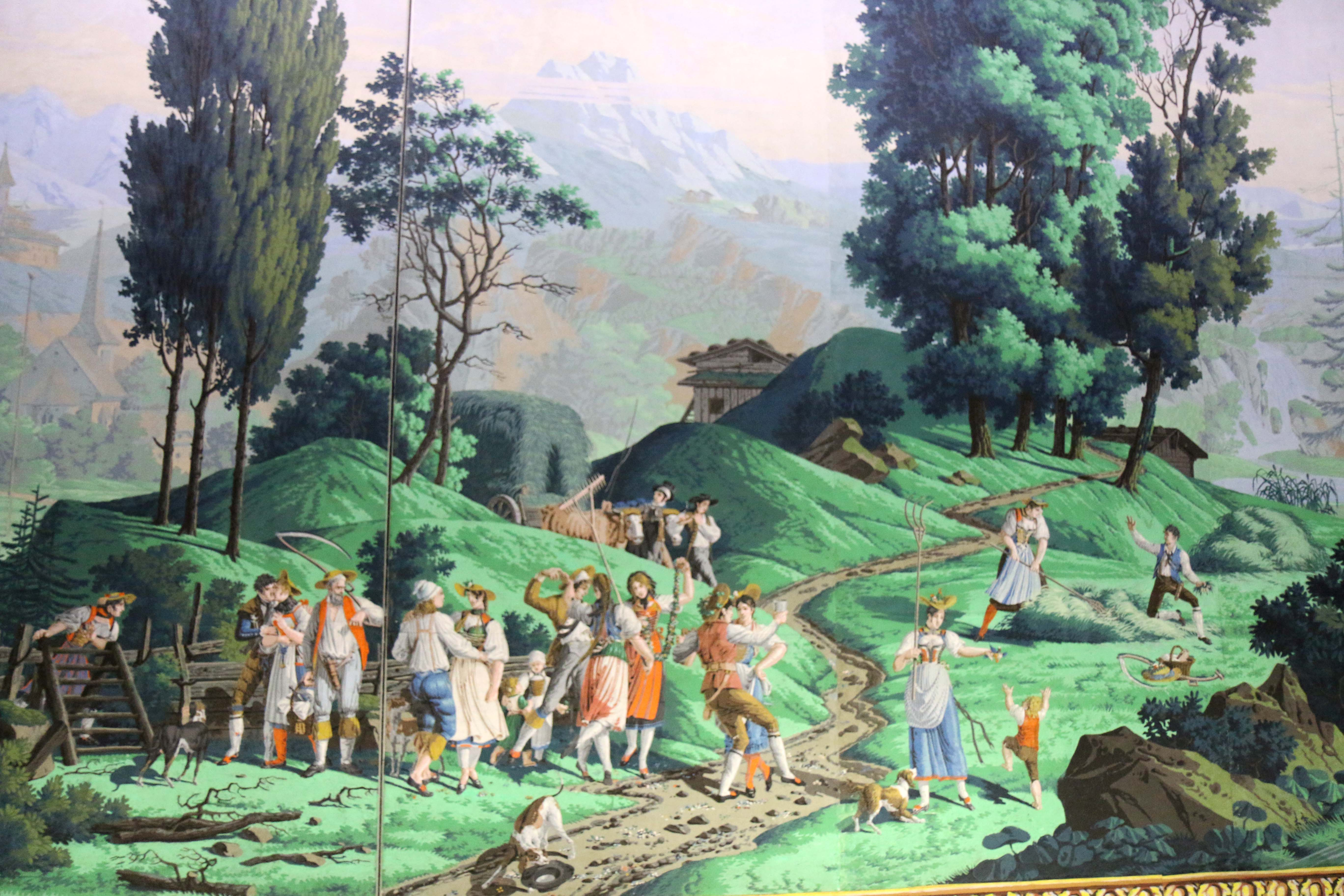
Detail view of scenic wallpaper by Mongin, in the Grande-Helvétie gallery at the chateau Borély, Marseille.

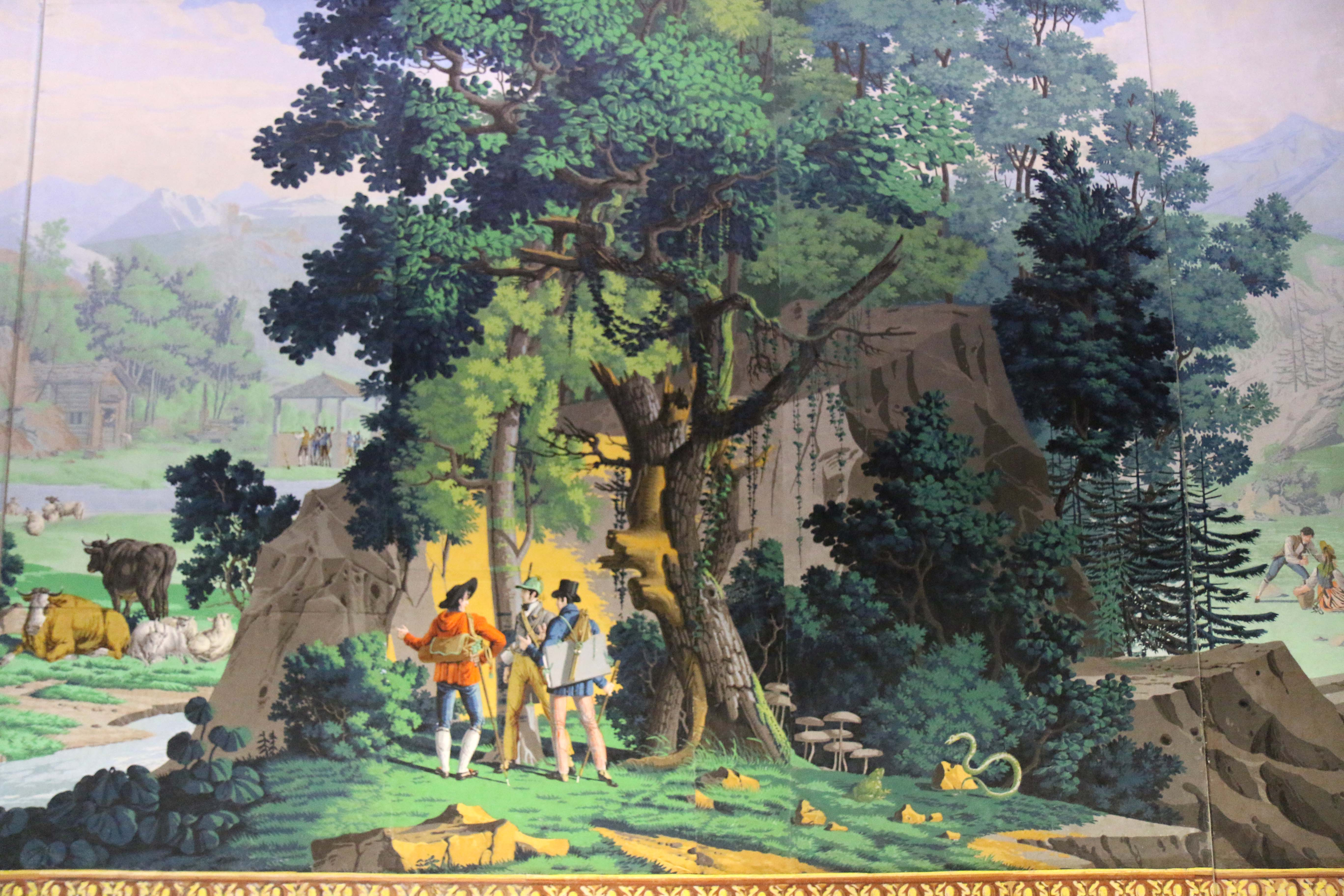
Detail view of scenic wallpaper by Mongin, in the Grande-Helvétie gallery at the chateau Borély, Marseille.

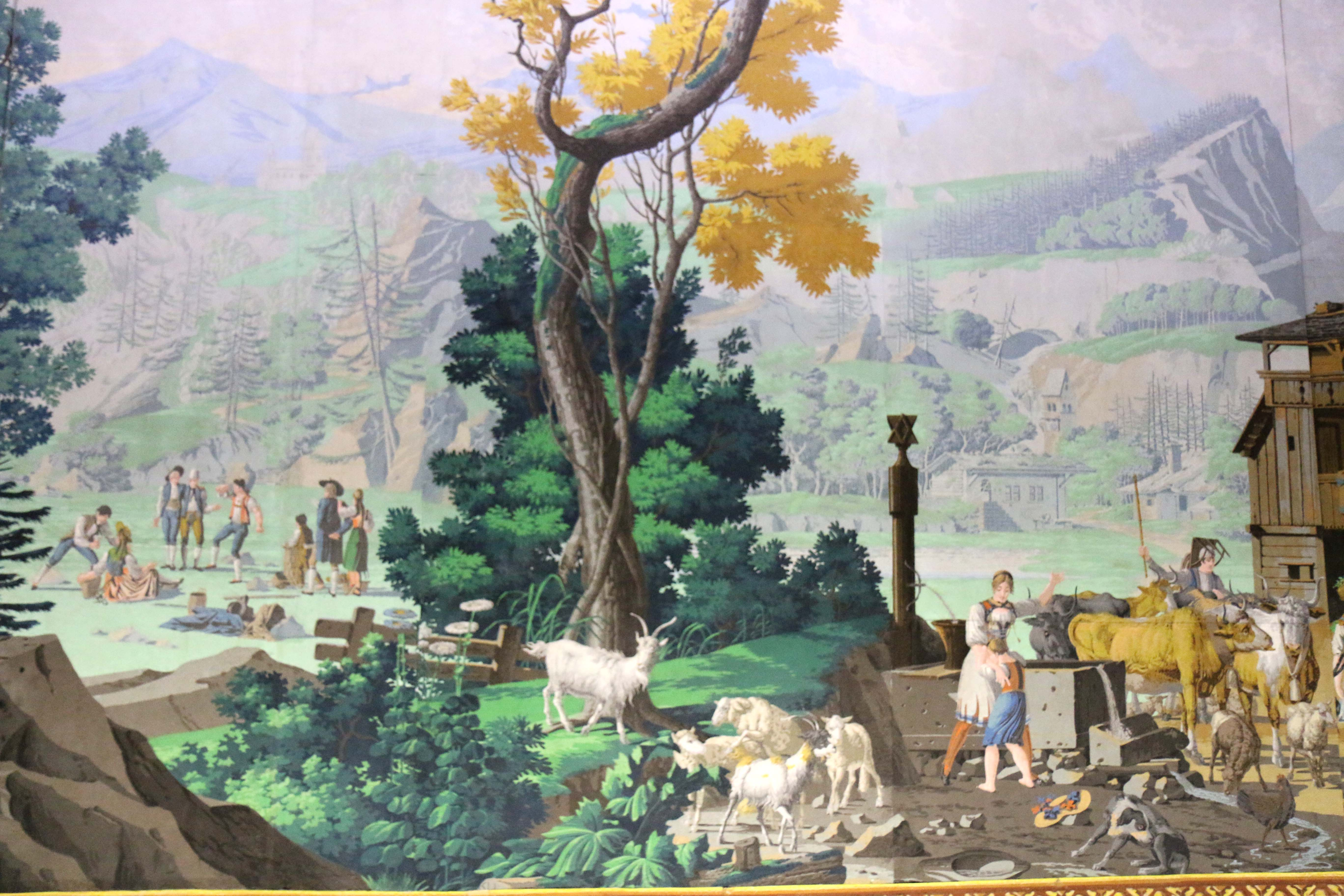
Detail view of scenic wallpaper by Mongin, in the Grande-Helvétie gallery at the chateau Borély, Marseille.

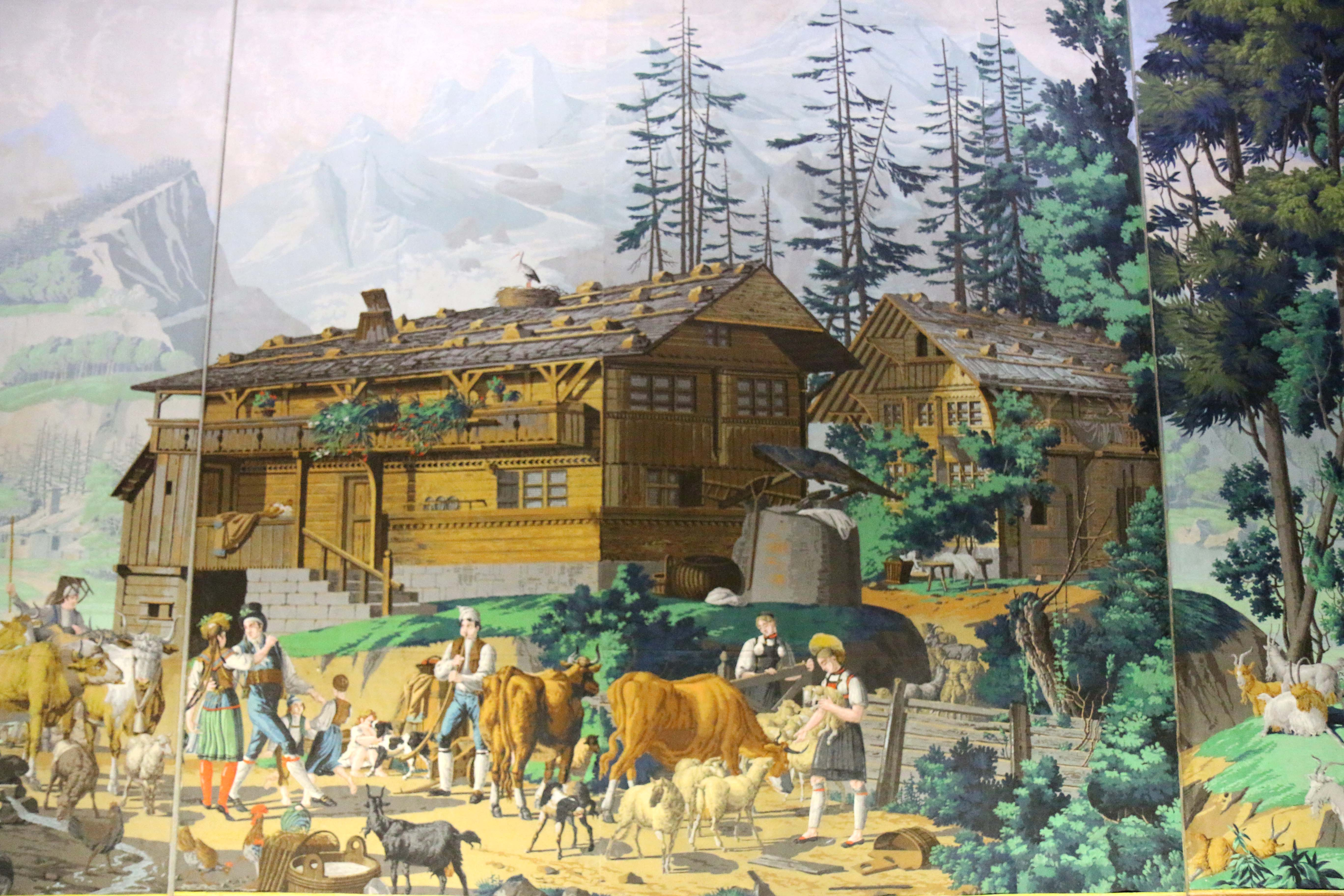
Detail view of scenic wallpaper by Mongin, in the Grande-Helvétie gallery at the chateau Borély, Marseille.
