= Bassem Sabry =

Bassem Sabry (باسم صبري)
- Born: 25 October 1982; Egypt
- Died: 29 April 2014 (aged 31); Giza, Cairo
- Cause of death: Fall from balcony
- Education: Cairo University
- Occupations: Film producer, journalist
- Website: http://anarabcitizen.blogspot.com

Bassem Sabry (Arabic: باسم صبري) (25 October 1982 – 29 April 2014) was an Egyptian journalist, blogger, civil rights campaigner who had reported extensively on the Egyptian Revolution and the founder of COMET which stands for "Conference on marketing, economics and trade". Al-Monitor eulogized him as being "widely considered to be among the most incisive and respected analysts of the country’s politics." He died on 29 April 2014 at the age of 31 in an ostensible accident after falling from the balcony of a Cairo apartment.

== Awards ==
- Free Media Pioneer Award (Al-Monitor), 2014
