= List of Légion d'honneur recipients by name (Z) =

The French government gives out the Legion of Honour awards, to both French and foreign nationals, based on a recipient's exemplary services rendered to France, or to the causes supported by France. This award is divided into five distinct categories (in ascending order), i.e. three ranks: Knight, Officer, Commander, and two titles: Grand Officer and Grand Cross. Knight is the most common and is awarded for either at least 20 years of public service or acts of military or civil bravery. The rest of the categories have a quota for the number of years of service in the category below before they can be awarded. The Officer rank requires a minimum of eight years as a Knight, and the Commander, the highest civilian category for a non-French citizen, requires a minimum of five years as an Officer. The Grand Officer and the Grand Cross are awarded only to French citizens, and each requires three years' service in their respective immediately lower rank. The awards are traditionally published and promoted on 14 July.

The following is a non-exhaustive list of recipients of the Legion of Honour awards, since the first ceremony in May 1803. 2,550 individuals can be awarded the insignia every year. The total number of awards is close to 1 million (estimated at 900,000 in 2021, including over 3,000 Grand Cross recipients), with some 92,000 recipients alive today. Only until 2008 was gender parity achieved amongst the yearly list of recipients, with the total number of women recipients since the award's establishment being only 59 at the end of the second French empire and only 26,000 in 2021.

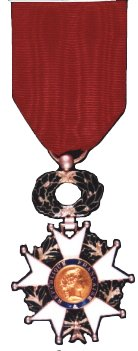

Recipient	Dates (birth – death)	General work & reason for the recognition	Award category (date)
Giuliano Zaccardelli	1946/1947 – present	Former Royal Canadian Mounted Police (RCMP) officer and RCMP Commissioner.	Knight (TBA); Officer (2003)
Basil Zaharoff	1849 – 1936	Greek arms dealer and industrialist	Knight (TBA); Officer (TBA); Commander (TBA); Grand Officer (TBA); Grand Cross (31 July 1914)
Józef Zajączek	1752 – 1826	Poland general and politician	Knight (1803); Commander (1804)
Zygmunt Zaleski	1882 – 1967	Polish literature historian, literary critic, poet, publicist, and translator	TBA
Arshad-uz Zaman	TBA – 2008	Bangladesh Ambassador. Recognised for his lifelong affection for France and its language, which included his translation of the works of Andre Malraux into Bengali. He was the first Bangladeshi to receive the award.	Knight (TBA)
L. L. Zamenhof	1859 – 1917	Ophthalmologist. Recognised for creating Esperanto.	Knight (TBA); Officer (1905)
Lucjan Żeligowski	1865 – 1947	Polish general, politician, military commander and veteran of World War I, the Polish–Soviet War and World War II	Knight (TBA); Officer (TBA); Commander(TBA)
Petar Zdravkovski	1912 – 1967	Educator, statesman, and diplomat	Knight (TBA); Officer (7 May 1956)
Zinedine Zidane	1972 – present	France former professional football player and coach. Recognised for winning the 1998 FIFA World Cup, scoring twice in the final.	Knight (1998); Officer (2008)
Henri Zuber	1844 – 1909	French landscape painter	Knight (1886)
Elmo R. Zumwalt, Jr.	1920 – 2000	United States Navy officer	Knight (TBA); Officer (TBA); Commander (TBA))

== See also ==
- Legion of Honour
- List of Legion of Honour recipients by name
- List of foreign recipients of Legion of Honour by name
- List of foreign recipients of the Legion of Honour by country
- List of British recipients of the Legion of Honour for the Crimean War
- Legion of Honour Museum
- Ribbons of the French military and civil awards
- War Cross (France)
