= Al-Monitor =

Middle East news website

AL-MONITOR
- Website type: News
- Available in: English
- Founder: Jamal Daniel
- Website: al-monitor.com
- Launched: February 13, 2012
- Current status: Active

AL-MONITOR is a news website launched in 2012 by the Arab-American entrepreneur Jamal Daniel. Based in Washington, D.C., AL-MONITOR provides reporting and analysis from and about the Middle East. AL-MONITOR is the recipient of the International Press Institute's 2014 Free Media Pioneer Award.

== History and organization ==
AL-MONITOR was launched on 13 February 2012 by Jamal Daniel. It was founded with the mission to foster a deeper understanding between the Middle East and the international community by diving deep with analytical pieces from some of the most trusted, independent authors from across the globe.

In 2018, AL-MONITOR partnered with North Base Media which was founded by former editor of The Washington Post and The Wall Street Journal, Marcus Brauchli and Sasa Vucinic to manage AL-MONITOR in order "to provide top-level operational and financial decision-making, and work with the company to explore possible content and commercial avenues."

== Content ==
AL-MONITOR features reporting and analysis by journalists and experts from the Middle East, with special focus sections on Egypt, the Persian Gulf, Iran, Iraq, Israel, Jordan, Lebanon, North Africa, Palestine, Syria, and Turkey.

In 2015, AL-MONITOR relaunched its website and expanded coverage to include further reporting on Washington, the addition of a culture section, a new podcast and video coverage. In 2023, AL-MONITOR launched its business and technology coverage, released several newsletters and introduced a subscription model to access its content. In 2024, AL-MONITOR integrated article translation in seven languages and narrated audio to listen to articles.

Past and present editors, columnists, and contributors include Amberin Zaman, formerly a Turkey correspondent for The Economist; Ben Caspit, one of Israel's top national security commentators and analysts; Daoud Kuttab, columnist for AL-MONITOR’s Palestine Pulse; Sultan al Qassemi, former columnist with the United Arab Emirates–based The National and one of Time's 140 Best Twitter Feeds of 2011 selections; Barbara Slavin, former diplomatic correspondent for USA Today and senior fellow at the Atlantic Council; Laura Rozen, a former foreign policy reporter for Politico, Foreign Policy, and Yahoo; the late Cairo-based political analyst Bassem Sabry, an Egyptian writer who wrote extensively on Egypt and the Arab Spring; Ali Hashem, correspondent for Al-Jazeera TV; and Jack Detsch, columnist for Foreign Policy; and Joyce Karam, former Washington correspondent for The National; and Edward Felsenthal, former editor-in-chief of Time.

== Awards ==
In 2014, the International Press Institute awarded AL-MONITOR its Free Media Pioneer Award, stating that AL-MONITOR's "unrivalled reporting and analysis exemplify the invaluable role that innovative and vigorously independent media can play in times of change and upheaval".

In 2017, the Online News Association awarded AL-MONITOR an Online Journalism Award for Best Explanatory Reporting for the series: "Middle East Lobbying: The Influence Game". The Society for Advancing Business Editing and Writing awarded AL-MONITOR a Best in Business Award for its Middle East lobbying newsletter in 2019.

== Reception ==
In January 2013, Ian Burrell of The Independent called AL-MONITOR "an ambitious website that pulls together the commentary of distinguished writers from across the region." In 2012, former The Washington Post foreign affairs blogger Max Fisher called AL-MONITOR "an invaluable Web-only publication following the Middle East." The Huffington Post has referred to AL-MONITOR as "increasingly a daily must-read for insightful commentary on the Middle East", and The Economist recommended AL-MONITOR's Egypt and Iran coverage in its What to Read section.

AL-MONITOR, alone among independent media outlets covering the Middle East, has covered the entire region – including field reporting and interviews from Israel, Iran, Iraq, Jordan, Lebanon, the West Bank, Gaza, Egypt, the Gulf and North Africa – and all governments consistently since inception in 2012, leading to its unique standing in the region.

Its coverage of Syria has been recognized for the stellar on the ground reporting by Amberin Zaman, as well as independent and opposition-affiliated Syrian reporters in Idlib, Aleppo, and elsewhere, working under often dangerous and difficult conditions. AL-MONITOR, throughout its history, has featured contributors from Israel, the West Bank and Gaza, avoiding the taint of 'bias' in its coverage of Israeli-Palestinian issues. Its inclusive and groundbreaking initiatives included a collaboration with PBS News Hour featuring a discussion with an Iranian academic (from Tehran), an Israeli reporter (from Tel Aviv), and former US officials including Dennis Ross and Fiona Hill (from Washington).

AL-MONITOR editors and journalists are frequently cited in global media as experts on the Middle East, including by the New York Times, Washington Post, BBC, Fox News, Al-Jazeera and many others. In 2024, the BBC described the outlet as a "respected Middle East newsletter".

== Events ==
In September 2023, on the sidelines of the United Nations General Assembly meetings in New York City, AL-MONITOR partnered with Semafor to host the Middle East Global Summit. Interviews at the summit included His Majesty King Abullah II of Jordan; Prime Minister Mohammed Al Sudani of Iraq; Senior Diplomatic Adviser to the UAE President Dr. Anwar Gargash; White House Senior Advisor for Energy and Investment Amos Hochstein; Oman Foreign Minister Sayyid Badr Albusaidi; US Assistant Secretary of State Barbara Leaf, as well as other senior regional ministers and private sector leaders.

== See also ==
- Asharq Al-Awsat
- Middle East Eye
- Middle East Monitor
- The New Arab
