= Arshad-uz Zaman =

Ambassador

Ambassador of Bangladesh to Egypt
- In office 22 February 1979 – 6 August 1981
- Preceded by: Mohammad Sultan
- Succeeded by: Mir Shawkat Ali

Personal details
- Died: 12 April 2008 Dhaka, Bangladesh
- Spouse: Vasfiye Kalmuk
- Children: Jazmin Zaman; Amberin Zaman
- Parent: Khan Bahadur Fazlur Rahman (father)
- Education: University of Calcutta; Sorbonne Université
- Awards: Legion of Honour - Knight

Arshad-uz Zaman (died 12 April 2008) was an ambassador of Bangladesh to Egypt, Senegal and Algeria, and an advisor to President Badruddoza Chowdhury.

== Early life ==
Zaman was born in Bagerhat District. His father was Khan Bahadur Fazlur Rahman. He graduated from the University of Calcutta. He then studied at the Instituts d'études politiques at Sorbonne Université.

== Career ==
In 1962–1963, Zaman served as the press attaché at the Permanent Mission of Pakistan to the United Nations.

Zaman served as the ambassador of Bangladesh to Algeria, Senegal, and Egypt. He served in the Organisation of Islamic Conference as the Assistant Secretary General for Political Affairs. His lifelong affection for France and its language, which included his translation of the works of Andre Malraux into Bengali, was recognised by a Legion of Honour award by the French government.

After retiring as a diplomat he wrote in a number of Bangladeshi newspapers such as the Janakantha, Dhaka Courier, and The Daily Star. He also worked as the advisor to President Badruddoza Chowdhury. In 2000, he published a memoir called Privileged Witness: Memoirs of a Diplomat. He was a Presidium member of Bikalpa Dhara Bangladesh.

== Personal life ==
Zaman was serving in the Pakistan consulate in the 1950s and studied Turkish under Vasfiye Kalmuk. He married her and they had two daughter; Jazmin and Amberin Zaman, a Turkish journalist.

== Death ==
Zaman died of cardiac arrest on 12 April 2008 at the United Hospital in Bangladesh.

== See also ==
- Legion of Honour
- List of Legion of Honour recipients by name (Z)
- List of foreign recipients of the Legion of Honour by country
- Legion of Honour Museum
