= Zuberi =

Zuberi (Arabic: زبيري; Bengali: ইতরাত), also written as Zubairi, Zubairy, Zubayr, Zoberi, Zobairi, or Zbiri is a surname from Arabic, meaning a descendant of someone named Zubayr. It is particularly found among Muslims in India and Pakistan. Notable people with the surname include:

- Farhan Zuberi. (Director Zuberi Welfare Society,Social Worker, Political Activist;born 1997)
- Ziauddin Ahmad (born Ziauddin Ahmed Zuberi; 1873–1947), Indian scholar
- Zubayr ibn al-Awam (c. 594–696), Arab military commander
- Iqbal Zuberi (c. 1932–2002), Pakistani journalist
- Itrat Husain Zuberi (1920–1964), Pakistani academic
- Laila Zuberi (born 1957), Pakistani actress
- Muhammad Suhail Zubairy (born 1952), American physicist
- Roohi Zuberi (born 1959), Indian social worker and politician
- Rukhsana Zuberi, Pakistani politician
- Sameer Zuberi (born 1979), Canadian politician
- Sameer Zuberi (physician), medical doctor and academic in paediatric neurology at the University of Glasgow
- Tahar Zbiri (1929–2024), Algerian military officer

== See also ==
- Zuber (disambiguation)
- Zubair (disambiguation)
- Zubayr ibn al-Awwam, a companion of Muhammad
