= Henri Zuber =

French painter (1844–1909)

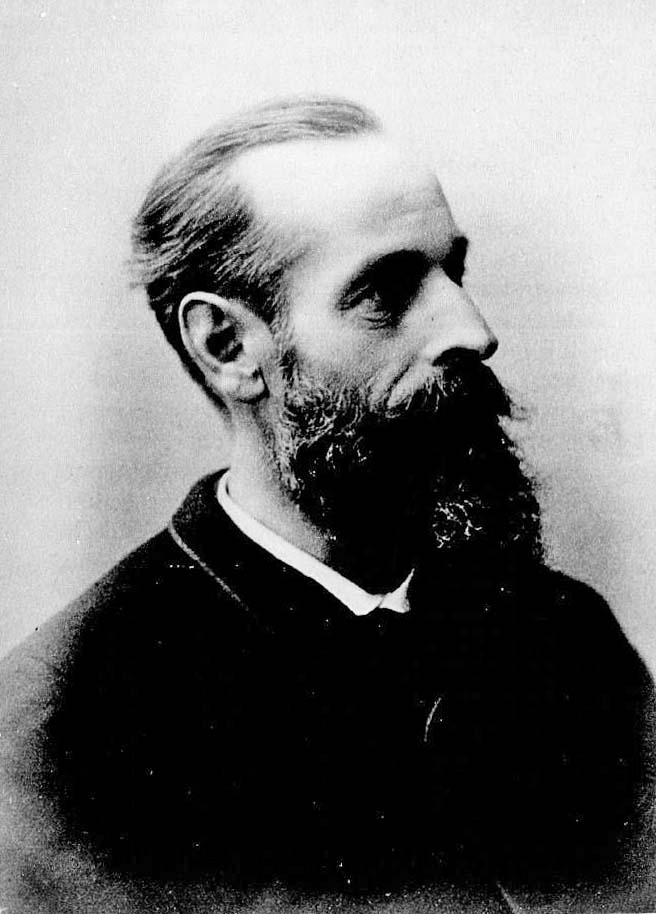
- Photograph of Henri Zuber by Antoine Meyer, c. 1887
- Born: Jean Henri Zuber; 24 June 1844; Rixheim, Haut-Rhin, Alsace, France
- Died: 7 April 1909 (aged 64); Paris, France
- Known for: landscape
- Awards: Legion of Honour - Knight (1886)
- Elected: 1869 Salon des artistes français 1884 Société d'aquarellistes français

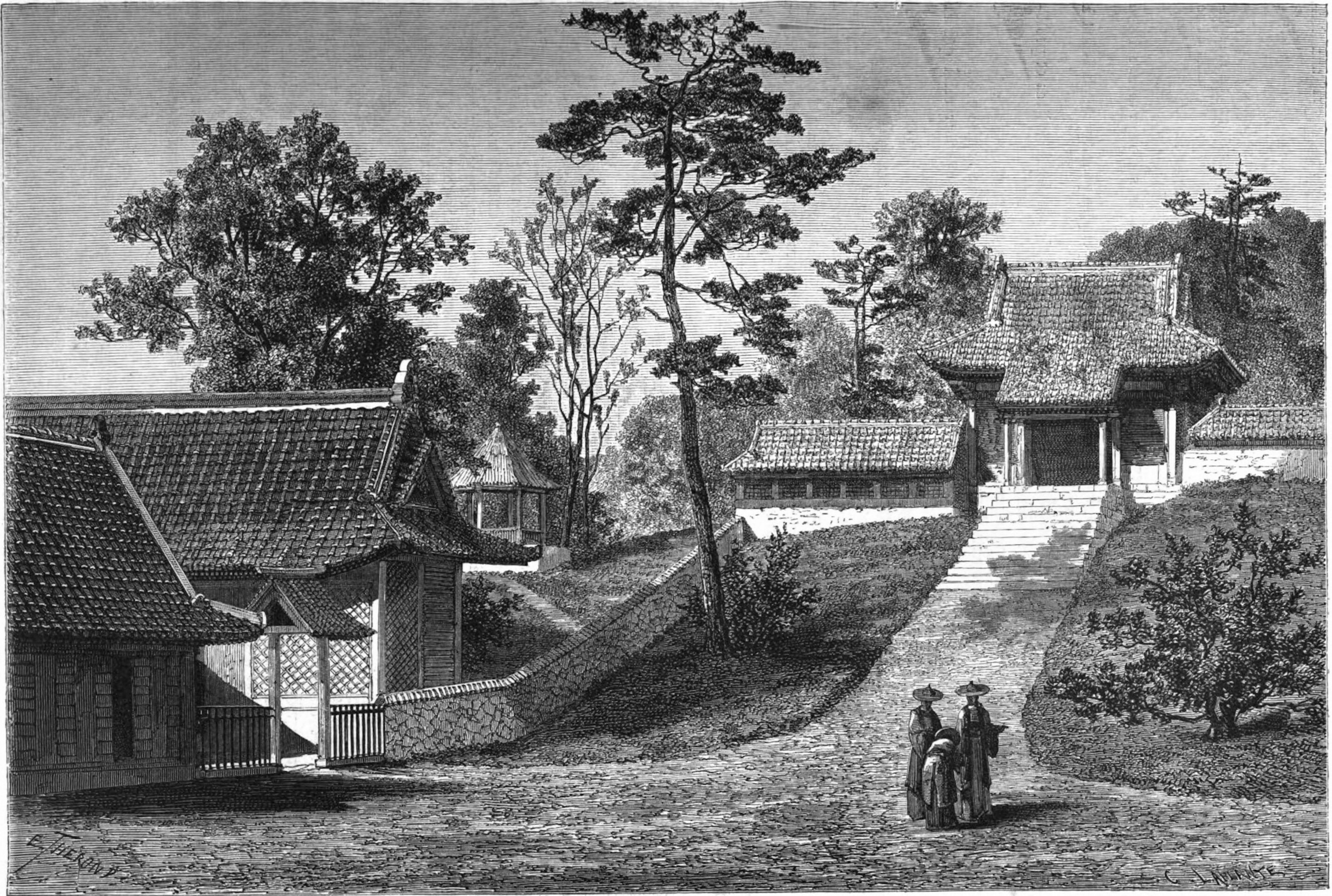
Henri Zuber, Yamoun du gouverneur à Kang-hoa, from Le Tour du monde: Nouveau journal des voyages, 1873

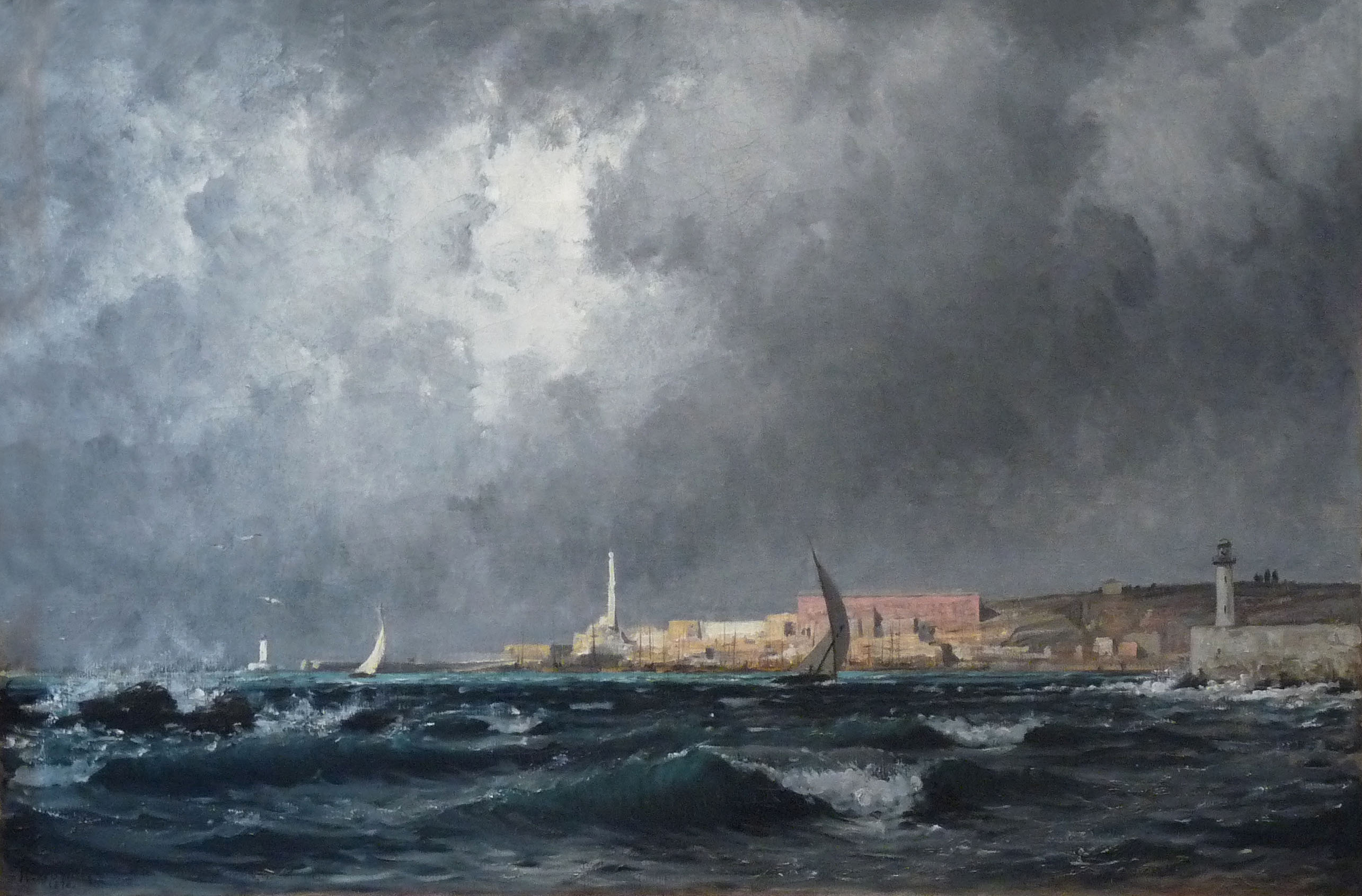
Henri Zuber, Entrée du port de Gênes
("Entrance to the port of Genova"), 1876

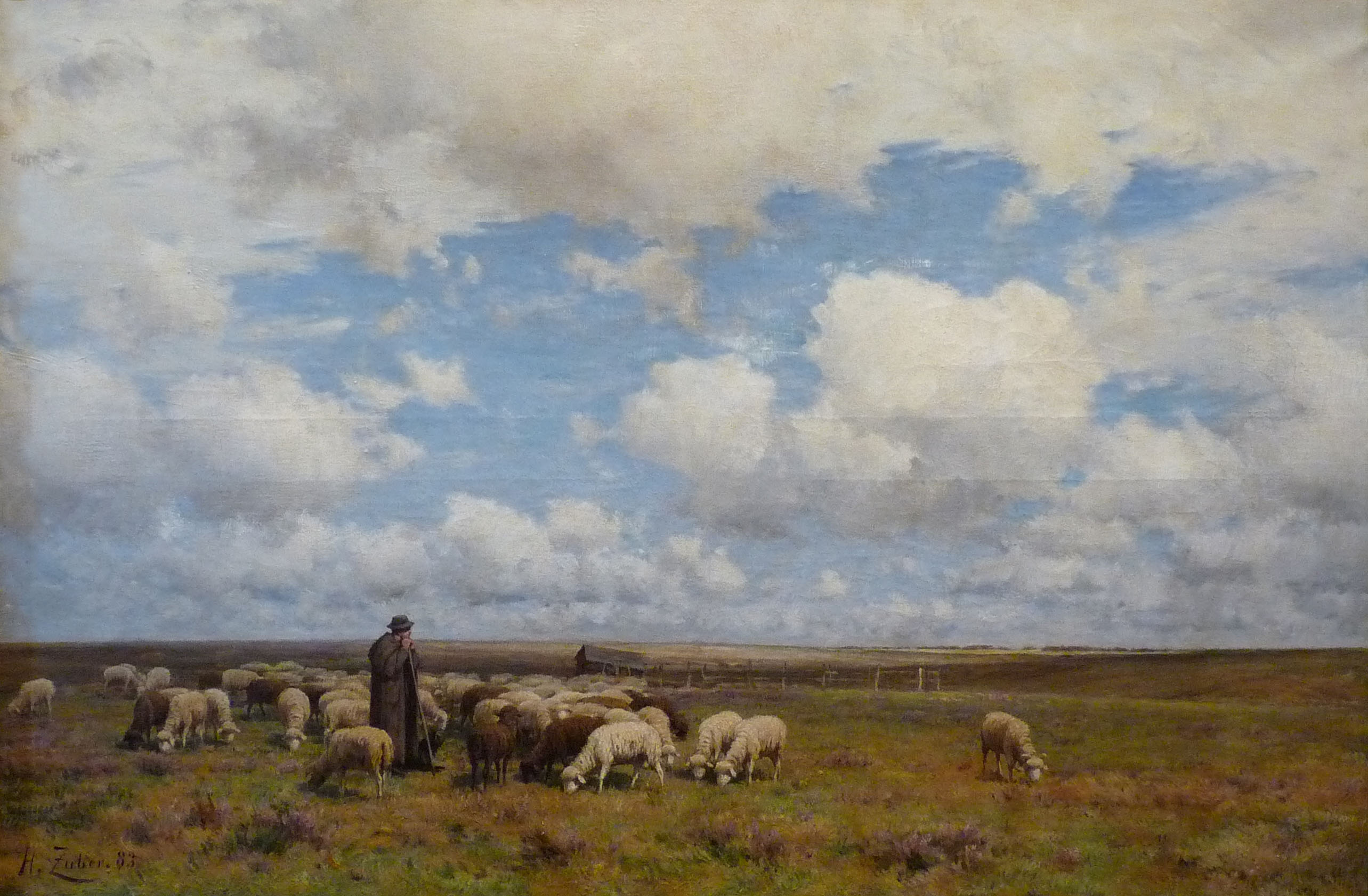
Henri Zuber, Le Troupeau de Vieux-Ferrette
("The flock of Vieux-Ferrette"), 1884

Jean Henri Zuber (24 June 1844 – 7 April 1909) was a French landscape painter. He was born in Rixheim, in the Haut-Rhin département of Alsace. He served in the French navy from 1863 to 1868, and took part in the French campaign against Korea in 1866.

== Painting ==
Zuber entered the atelier of Charles Gleyre in 1868 and was admitted to the Salon des artistes français in 1869. In 1873, he published an account of his experiences in Korea, with his own illustrations, in the Hachette periodical Le Tour du Monde.

From 1884, he is listed as a member of the Société d'aquarellistes français or "French society of watercolourists".

In 1886, he was made a knight of France's Légion d'honneur.

Zuber died in Paris on 7 April 1909. His grandfather was Jean Zuber, founder of Zuber & Cie in Rixheim.

== See also ==
- Legion of Honour
- List of Legion of Honour recipients by name (Z)
- Legion of Honour Museum
