= Diplomatic Reception Room =

Room in the White House

Coordinates: 38.897583°N 77.036567°W

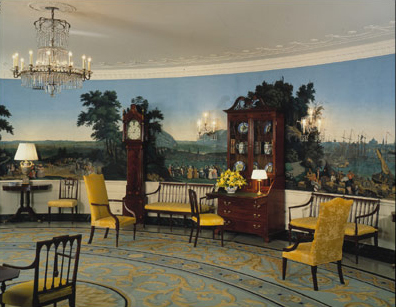
West side of the Diplomatic Reception Room showing the panoramic Zuber et Cie wallpaper Scenes of North America.

White House ground floor showing location of the Diplomatic Reception Room.

The Diplomatic Reception Room is one of three oval rooms in the Executive Residence of the White House, the official home of the president of the United States. It is located on the ground floor and is used as an entrance from the South Lawn and as a reception room for foreign ambassadors to present their credentials, a ceremony formerly conducted in the Blue Room. The room is also the entry into the White House for a visiting head of state following the State Arrival Ceremony on the South Lawn. The room has four doors, which lead to the Map Room, the Center Hall, the China Room, and a vestibule that leads to the White House driveway on the South Lawn.

== History ==
For its first hundred years, the ground floor of the White House was used as a service and work area. Domestic staff used it for storage, kitchens, and maintenance. White House domestic staff gathered in this room to do mending and polish silver. In 1837, the Van Buren administration installed a furnace here for the White House's first central heating system. Later steam boilers replaced the gravity system, remaining until the 1902 renovation by McKim, Mead, and White.

The 1902 renovation during the Theodore Roosevelt administration dramatically reconfigured the ground floor. Multiple layers of rotting floorboards were removed, and new flooring was installed. Several new rooms were framed and finished with a finished plaster coat. A gentlemen's and ladies' lounge and guest bathrooms were created. Charles Follen McKim admired James Hoban's groin vault ceilings in the center hall. The hall was refurbished, and the center hall connected the new East and West wings. Though the ground floor oval room was much improved and now a part of the finished living space in the house, it remained primarily a passageway, not a destination.

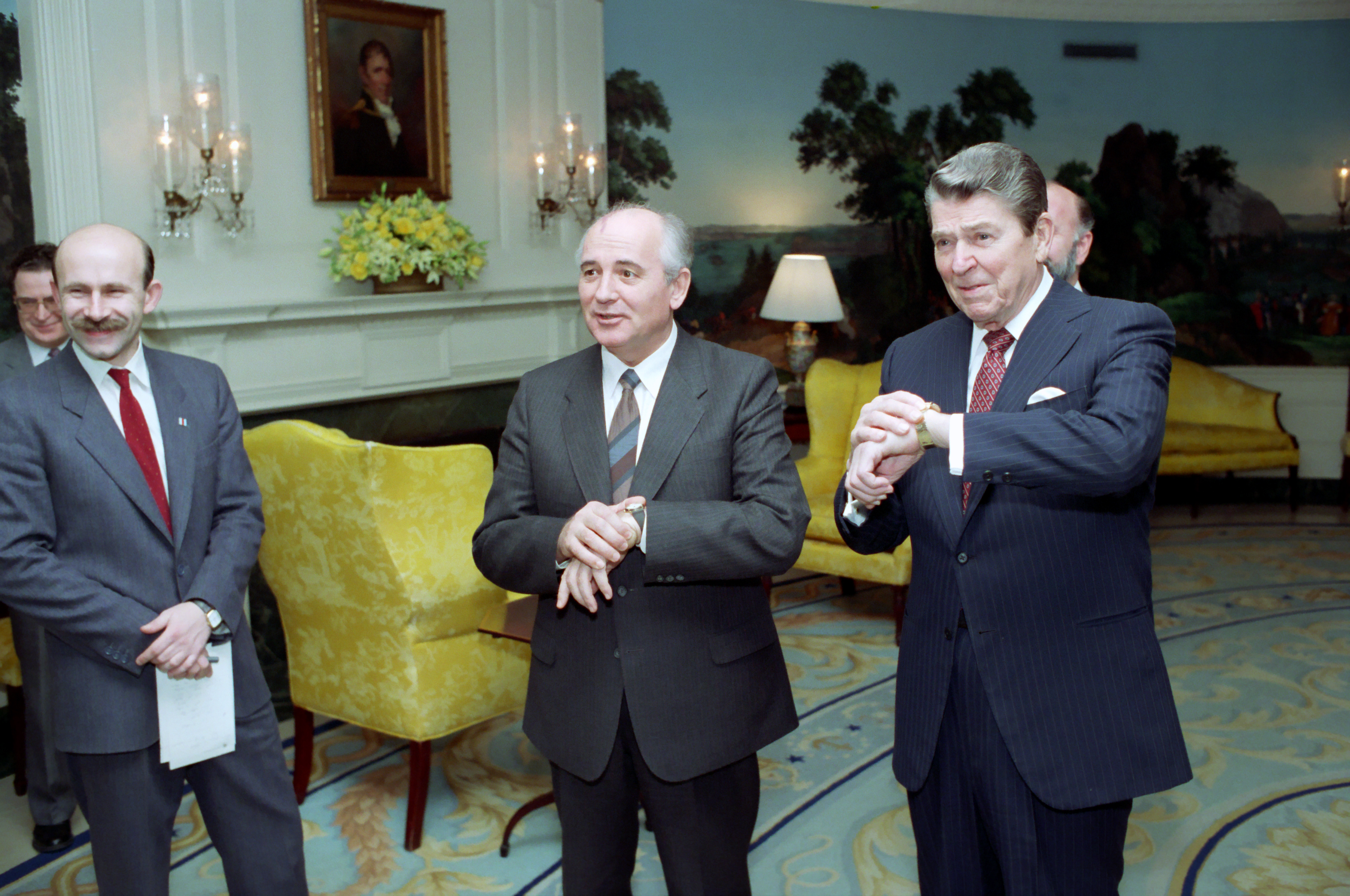
President Reagan and Soviet General Secretary Gorbachev in the White House Diplomatic Reception Room

In 1935, Franklin Roosevelt had a chimney opened so he could conduct his "fireside chats." White House architect Lorenzo Winslow designed a new chimney breast and mantel that, though intended to appear traditional, subtly evokes Art Moderne in its ribbed curved sides.

Rebuilt by Harry Truman as a sitting room, it was refurbished in 1960 during the Dwight Eisenhower administration in the style of the Federalist Era with antiques selected by New York interior designer Michael Greer. In 1962, with advice from American antique expert Henry Francis du Pont, First Lady Jacqueline Kennedy had the room papered with antique French scenic wallpaper produced by Jean Zuber et Cie in Rixheim (Alsace), France c. 1834. The Zuber wallpaper, titled Scenes of North America, was printed from multiple woodblocks and features scenes of Boston Harbor, the Natural Bridge in Virginia, West Point, New York, Niagara Falls, and New York Harbor. The sweeping panorama on the elliptical walls provide a sense of space, negating the lack of windows. Additional Federal-era furniture was acquired, and upholsteries and the carpet furthered a soft gold and blue decor.

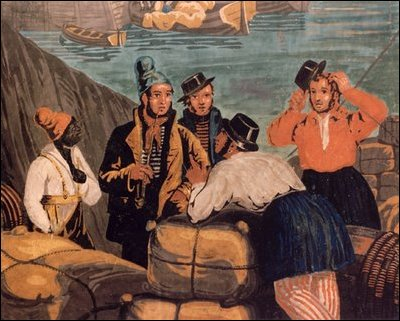
Detail of the panoramic Zuber et Cie wallpaper Scenes of North America showing Boston Harbor. The African American men depicted wear Phrygian caps as a sign of their status as free men.

A labeled mahogany bookcase-desk by John Shaw was made in Annapolis in 1797 and formerly stood in the Kennedy Green Room. A suite of lancet-arched side chairs and a pair of sofas with splayed legs are attributed to the workshop of New York cabinetmakers Abraham Slover and Jacob Taylor. The furniture is upholstered in a yellow silk damask. A rug in shades of blue and gold, incorporating the seals or coats of arms of the fifty United States in an elliptical border, specially made for the room in 1983. An English Regency chandelier of cut glass and bronze three-armed crystal sconces with glass chimneys illuminate the room.

== Bibliography ==
- Abbott, James A.; Rice, Elaine M. (1998). Designing Camelot: The Kennedy White House Restoration. New York: Van Nostrand Reinhold. ISBN 0-442-02532-7.

== For further reading ==
- Clinton, Hillary Rodham (2000). An Invitation to the White House: At Home with History. Simon & Schuster. ISBN 0-684-85799-5.
- Leish, Kenneth (1972). The White House. Newsweek Book Division. ISBN 0-882-25020-5.
- McKellar, Kenneth; Douglas W. (1952). Orr, Edward Martin (ed.). Report of the Commission on the Renovation of the Executive Mansion. Commission on the Renovation of the Executive Mansion, Government Printing Office.
- Monkman, Betty C. (2000). The White House: The Historic Furnishing & First Families. Abbeville Press. ISBN 0-7892-0624-2.
- Seale, William (1987). The President's House (Third ed.). Washington, D.C.: White House Historical Association and the National Geographic Society. ISBN 0-912308-28-1.
- Seale, William (1992). The White House: The History of an American Idea. White House Historical Association. ISBN 978-1-558-35048-9..
- The White House: An Historic Guide (23rd ed.). White House Historical Association and the National Geographic Society. 1999. ISBN 978-0-833-51232-1.
