= Amberin Zaman =

Turkish journalist

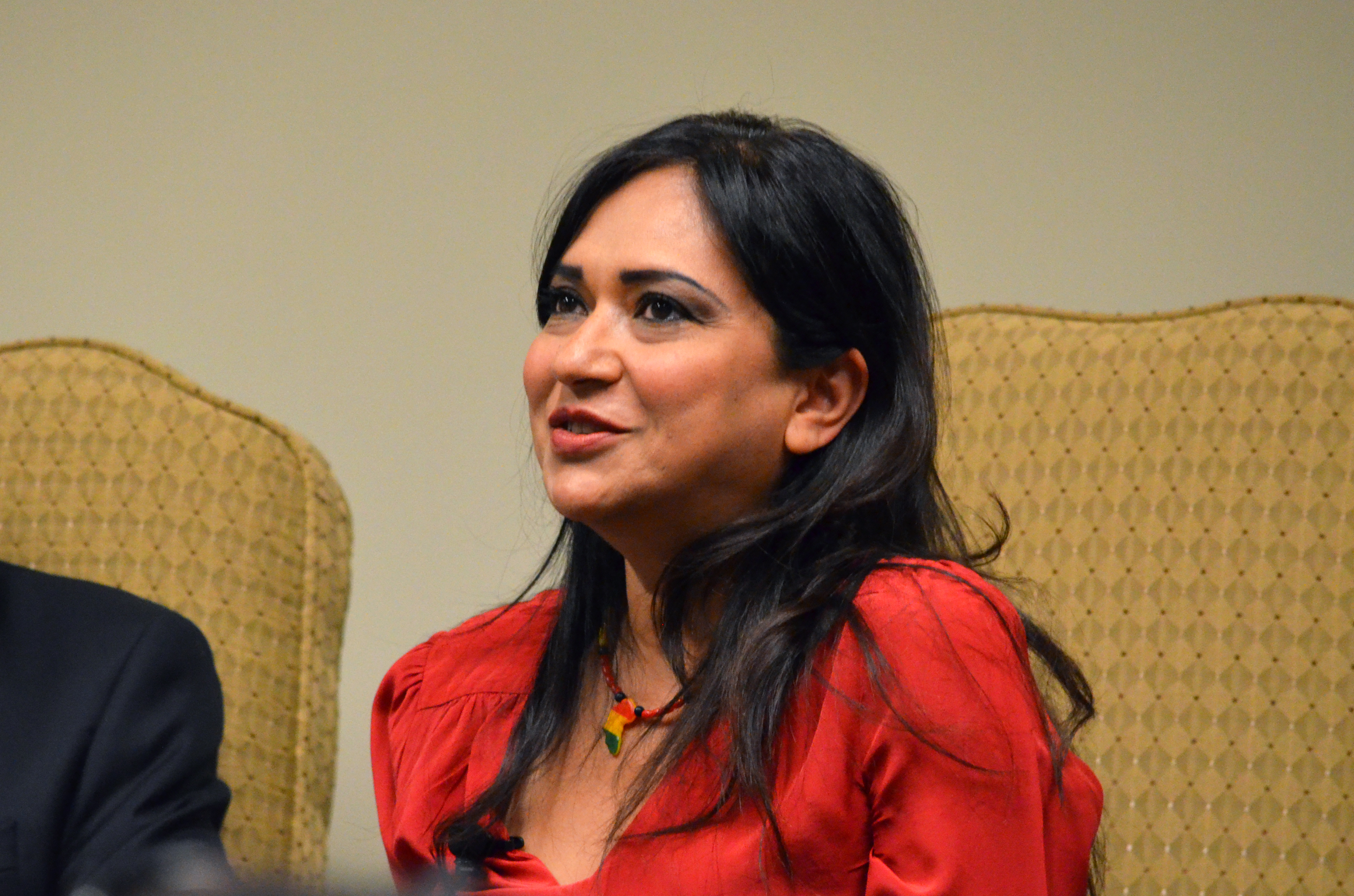
- Amberin Zaman in 2017
- Born: New York City, US
- Education: Franklin University Switzerland (BA)
- Occupation: Journalist
- Height: 1.52 m (5 ft 0 in)
- Spouse: Joseph S. Pennington
- Website: www.al-monitor.com/authors/amberin-zaman.html

Amberin Zaman is a Turkish journalist and a chief correspondent for Al-Monitor based in Paris covers major stories on the Middle East and North Africa . Having started as a journalist in the early 1990s in Turkey, Zaman contributes to various newspapers throughout the world. Her reporting focuses on geopolitical trends, conflicts, diplomacy and human rights. She studied political science at Franklin College in Lugano Switzerland, speaks fluent English, French, Turkish and Bengali.

== Life and career ==
Amberin Zaman is the daughter of Arshad-uz Zaman a former Bangladeshi Ambassador and member of parliament. Her mother is a Turk from Istanbul. She was born in New York City and studied in Switzerland. Prior to joining Al-Monitor as a full-time reporter in 2018, Zaman was The Economist’s Turkey correspondent for 16 years. She was also a regular contributor to The Washington Post, The Daily Telegraph, The Los Angeles Times and Voice of America and penned weekly columns in the Turkish language media. After being sacked from Habertürk, Zaman was employed with the liberal newspaper Taraf. She also specialises in Kurdish issues and was a Public Policy Scholar at the Woodrow Wilson International Center for Scholars in Washington DC from January 2016 to June 2017. She is a columnist for Al Monitor since December 2018.

== Views and controversies ==
Amberin Zaman has been a supporter of minority rights in Turkey. She is a proponent of normalization of Turkish-Armenian relations and regularly discusses the Armenian genocide in her columns. In 2014, she participated in a conference by the Hrant Dink Foundation that was dedicated to Armenian-Turkish reconciliation. Zaman, who recognizes the Armenian genocide as fact, believes that the Turkish government must reconcile with its history concerning the Armenians. In response to the Turkish government's letter of condolences to Armenians on 24 April 2014, Zaman declared:

As a citizen who believes that the Armenian genocide must be recognized, apologized for, and whose victims be properly compensated, even if these expectations may be far from occurring, I officially stand with the state's first written letter to the Armenian victims.

Zaman states that she is a target of a vilification campaign by pro-government media. In 2013, Amberin Zaman was sacked as a journalist for HaberTurk because of columns that were considered unacceptable by the government.

Zaman was attacked on Twitter for reporting the Gezi Park protests. She described the attacks as "abusive, violent and sexual".

In 2014, the Prime Minister of Turkey, Recep Tayyip Erdoğan, called Amberin Zaman "A militant in the guise of a journalist, a shameless woman... Know your place!" and "scum" at two successive election rallies. In a response to the accusations by the Prime Minister, Zaman wrote a column in the newspaper Taraf entitled "First be a human!" (Turkish: Önce insan ol!). A public apology campaign had started with numerous human rights groups and journalist associations throughout the world. Erdogan's rhetoric was condemned by a representative of the Organization for Security and Cooperation, The Economist, and the Turkish Journalists' Association. The Equality Monitoring Women's Group of Turkey collected 130 signatures demanding that Erdogan apologize for his language.

Zaman "experienced a mass attack on Twitter" for her reporting on the Charlie Hebdo shooting in January 2015. Zaman stated: "It's like a public lynching. It has made me frightened for my physical safety when I am out in the streets." Zaman has not returned to Turkey since 2016. The Metropolitan Police have installed a panic button in her home in London.

In November 2022 she experienced a smear campaign launched against her by pro-Turkish-government media outlets and social media users after she met with Turkey's main opposition leader Kemal Kılıçdaroğlu in London.

== Personal life ==
She is married to Joseph Pennington, the US Deputy Assistant Secretary of State for Iraq.
