= Petar Zdravkovski =

Yugoslav educator, statesman and diplomat

- Петар Здравковски - Пенко
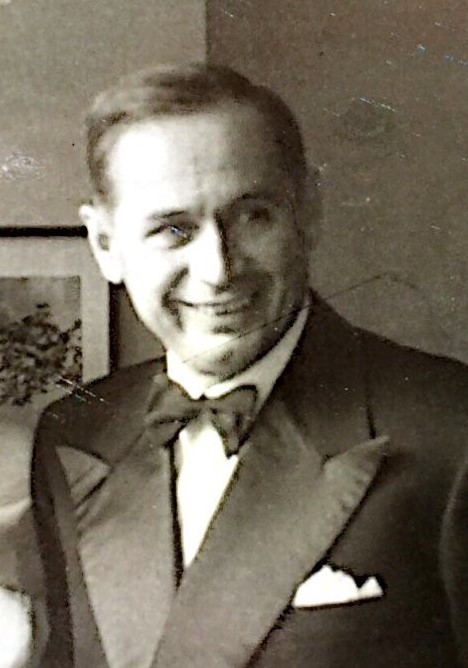
- Born: November 4, 1912; Prilep, Ottoman Empire
- Died: July 26, 1967 (aged 54); Beirut, Lebanon
- Monuments: Elementary school in Skopje
- Other names: Penko
- Occupations: educator, statesman, diplomat
- Spouse: Zdravka Zdravkovska
- Awards: Legion of Honour – Officer (1956)

Petar Zdravkovski (November 4, 1912 – July 26, 1967) was a Yugoslav educator, statesman and diplomat.

== Biography ==
Petar Zdravkovski, also known as Penko, was born on November 4, 1912, in Prilep, Ottoman Empire. He graduated from the Teachers College in Belgrade, Yugoslavia, where he became involved in the students' and workers' Socialist movement. After graduation he worked as a teacher in the villages of Grnčarevo and Podmočani near Resen.

He joined the Communist Party of Yugoslavia (CPY) and after the occupation of then Vardar Banovina he took part in the preparations for the armed resistance in Prilep. He was jailed and after a long interrogation he was interned in Bulgaria. In the spring of 1943 he returned to Vardar Macedonia, and in the autumn of the same year he joined the armed partisan forces in Debarca.

After the Second World War he was appointed to various political functions: teacher at the Party High School in Skopje, Chief of the Press Department of the Government of the People's Republic of Macedonia (PRM); head of Radio Skopje (1947–1949); Secretary General of the PRM Government (1949–1950), member of the Executive Council of PRM; Minister of the Council of Education (1957-1962); Minister of the Council for Science; member of the Parliament of the Socialist Republic of Macedonia Central Committee. As Minister of Education, he was President of the Council of the University in Skopje.

== Diplomatic career ==
He was fluent in French and had a working knowledge of English, Russian and Turkish. He started his diplomatic career as a minister plenipotentiary (rank of ambassador) to the Yugoslav diplomatic mission in Helsinki, Finland (1950-1953). He was appointed chief of staff of the Department for Foreign Affairs in Belgrade (1953–1954) and consul general of Yugoslavia to Marseille, France (1954–1957). In 1965 he was appointed ambassador of Yugoslavia to Beirut, Lebanon (also accredited to Jordan), where after a short illness he died in 1967.

He was buried with high state honors in the Alley for Distinguished Citizens in the Butel Cemetery in Skopje.

== Decorations ==
He was awarded many national and international decorations:

Award	Year
Commemorative Medal of the Partisans of 1941	26 October 1946
Yugoslav Fraternity and Unity Medal	1 June 1947
Yugoslav Medal of Merit	1 June 1947
Yugoslav Medal for Courage	14 April 1950
Grand Cross of the Order of the Lion of Finland	12 December 1952
Yugoslav Order of the Republic	27 November 1961
Officer of France's Legion of Honour	7 May 1956
Lebanese National Order of the Cedar	11 October 1967 (posthumously)

In the Butel municipality in Skopje an elementary school bears his name.

A street in the city of Prilep bears the name Penko Zdravkovski.

== See also ==
- List of Legion of Honour recipients by name (Z)
- Legion of Honour Museum
