= Itrat Husain Zuberi =

Pakistani academic (1906–1964)

- ইতরাত হোসেন জুবেরী

1st Vice Chancellor of University of Rajshahi
- In office 6 July 1953 – 30 September 1957
- Succeeded by: Momtazuddin Ahmed

Personal details
- Born: 8 June 1906 Bengal Presidency, British India
- Died: 14 December 1964 (aged 58) Windsor, Canada
- Education: St. John's College, Agra; Allahabad University; Merton College, Oxford; University of Edinburgh
- Occupation: University academic

Itrat Husain Zuberi FRSL (Bengali: ইতরাত হোসেন জুবেরী) (8 June 1906 – 14 December 1964) was a noted educationist of Pakistan. He began his educational career as a teacher in East Pakistan and served in various capacities including professor, principal, vice-chancellor, educational adviser, and member of the executive board of UNESCO. Itrat was the first Pakistani to be elected a Carnegie Fellow at Oxford.

== Education ==
Zuberi held an MA, PhD, and D.F.R.S.I. He was educated at St. John's College, Agra, where he took his MA; Allahabad University; Merton College, Oxford (1948–1950); and the University of Edinburgh, where he received a PhD under the supervision of the renowned scholar Sir Herbert J. C. Grierson.

== Professor and Principal, Islamia College, Calcutta (1938–1953) ==
Zuberi joined the Bengal Senior Education Service on 1 January 1938 as senior professor of English at Islamia College, an undergraduate college affiliated with the University of Calcutta, predating the establishment of the University of Rajshahi. He served Islamia College as senior professor and later as principal until his appointment as Vice-Chancellor of the University of Rajshahi in 1953.

In 1942, Zuberi married Saida Idris; they had one son and two daughters.

== Vice-Chancellor, University of Rajshahi (1953–1957) ==
In 1953, the Government of East Pakistan (now Bangladesh) enacted the Rajshahi University Act 1953, published through a gazette notification on 16 June 1953. The Governor of East Bengal served as Chancellor, and Zuberi, then Principal of Islamia College, was appointed the first Vice-Chancellor of the university. Working alongside Madar Baksh, another patron of learning, Zuberi prepared a development plan for the full-fledged university. All intermediate, degree, vocational, and technical education colleges in the Rajshahi and Khulna divisions were affiliated to the newly established institution. Zuberi served as Vice-Chancellor from 7 June 1953 until 30 September 1957.

== Educational Adviser, Ministry of Education, Pakistan ==
Following the independence of India and Pakistan in August 1947, Zuberi continued to serve East Pakistan until 1957, when he was appointed Educational Adviser at the Ministry of Education in Karachi.

== Member, Executive Board of UNESCO ==
On 19 December 1957, Zuberi was appointed a member of the executive board of UNESCO during its 49th session in Paris. The Board accepted the resignation of Momtazuddin Ahmed (Pakistan) under paragraph 4 of Article V of UNESCO's Constitution and appointed Zuberi to serve the remainder of that term of office.

Zuberi died in Windsor, Canada, on 14 December 1964, where he had been serving as Professor of English Literature at the University of Windsor. He was buried in Karachi seven days later, on 21 December 1964.

== Publications ==
- The Dogmatic and Mystical Theology of John Donne (1938, London: Society for Promoting Christian Knowledge & New York: Macmillan)
- The Technique of T. S. Eliot and the "Portrait of a Lady" (1945, London & New York: Longmans-Green)
- The Mystical Element in the Metaphysical Poets of the Seventeenth Century (1948, Edinburgh: Oliver and Boyd)
- From Mallory to Huxley (1951)
- English Prose, 1600–1660 (1965, New York: Holt, Rinehart and Winston) (with Victor Harris)
- Poems (1974, Pakistan: s.n.)

== See also ==
- Zubairi
