= Al-Zubair 2 =

AL-Zubair 2
- Type: Main battle tank
- Place of origin: Sudan

Service history
- In service: 2011–present
- Used by: See Sudan Armed Forces

Production history
- Manufacturer: Sudanese Military Industry

Specifications
- Mass: 37 ton
- Crew: 4
- Engine: 780 hp
- Operational range: 400 km
- Maximum speed: 65 km/h

The Al-Zubair 2 is a Sudanese main battle tank based on the Chinese Type 59D.

== Country of origin ==
Sudan

Military Industry Corporation

Characteristics

Combat weight 37ton Crew 4 Cruising Range 350 km Power to weight ratio 19.7 hp/ton General Pressure 87kPa

== Power Pack ==
Power 730 hp Cooling Water cooled Fuel Diesel Transmission Fixed - shaft type Turning Skid Final Drive Planetary Type

== Armament ==
Main Gun 105;mm. Smooth bore NATO cannon.

== Ammunition ==
Main Gun 45 AAMG 500 Co-Axial MG 2500 Grenades 20

== Dimension ==
Length (gun forward position) 9.973 m Width 3.390 m Height 2.400 m

== FCS ==
Type Image Stabmzed Fire Control System Optics LASER Protected Firing Capacity S-S, S-M NVD'S Image intensifier slehtino system

== Protection ==
Add on Armour Composite ( Frontal Arc) Explosive Reactive armor installed on turret and upper front plate Fire Extinguishing & Explosion Suppression included Smoke discharge System included Running Gear

== Performance ==
Maximum speed 57 km/h T ranch Crossing 2.7 m Obstacle Crossing 0.8 m Gradient 60% Side Slope 30%

== Ammunition types ==
APFSDS HEAT, HE (can fire all nato 105mm ammunition.) Loaded by loader. Co-axial MG 7.62 X 54 mm AAMG 12.7x108mm commanders/loaders heavy mg. LRF

Type NdYAG Range 200 – 5000 m Radio System

Type 889 T Freguency Range 20 - 49.975 MHZ Distance Range 20 – 25 km
