= Jean Zuber =

French businessperson

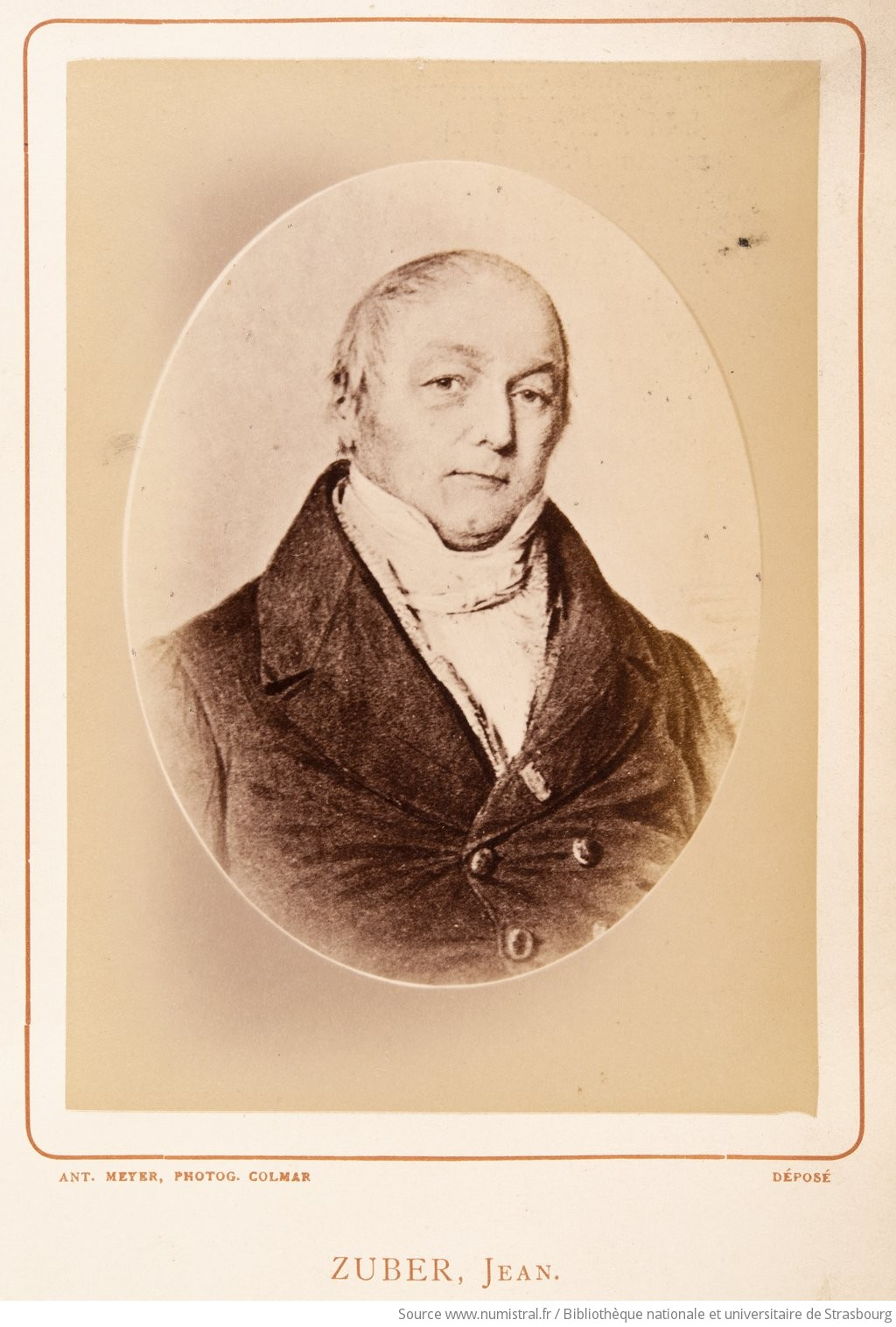
- Zuber, c. 1840
- Born: Jean Zuber; 1 May 1773; Mulhouse, Kingdom of France (now France)
- Died: 8 August 1852 (aged 79); Rixheim, Kingdom of France
- Occupation: Industrialist
- Years active: 1797-1852
- Known for: Founding Zuber & Cie
- Spouse: Elisabeth Spoerlin (m. 1796)
- Children: 2
- Relatives: Henri Zuber (grandson)
- Honours: Legion of Honour (1834)

Jean Zuber (1 May 1773 - 8 August 1852) was an industrialist from Alsace who is primarily known for founding the wallpaper company Zuber & Cie in Rixheim in 1797. In 1834, he was awarded the Legion of Honour for his industrial achievements. He was the grandfather of French landscape painter Henri Zuber.

== Personal life ==
On 8 August 1796, Zuber married Elisabeth Spoerlin (5 February 1775 - 20 September 1856) and they had two sons:

- Jean Zuber Jr. (1799-1853) who married Adèle Elise Oppermann and had two children; Mélanie Zuber and Jean Henri Zuber.
- Frédéric Zuber (1803-1891), who married Amélie Elisabeth Frauger and had one son; Charles Eugène Zuber.

Zuber died aged 79 at his residence La Commanderie Park in Rixheim.
