= Nabila al-Zubayr =

Yemeni poet and novelist

Nabila Muhsin Ali al-Zubayr (born 1964) is a Yemeni poet and novelist. She was born in the village of al-Hagara in the Haraz region and studied at the University of Sanaa, obtaining a BA in psychology. In the past, she has been a regular contributor to Yemeni journals al-Thawra, al-'Uruba, al-Mithaq and al-Mar'a. Her first book of poems titled Mutawaliyat al-kidhba al-ra'i'a (Successions of the Magnificent Lie) was published in Damascus in 1990. She has published further volumes of poetry since.

al-Zubayr's poetry has appeared in English translation in Banipal magazine and also in a 2008 anthology called Language for a New Century: Contemporary Poetry from the Middle East, Asia, and Beyond.
