= Al-Zubair District =

Coordinates: 30°23′22″N 47°42′52″E

Al-Zubair District Arabic: قضاء الزبير
- District
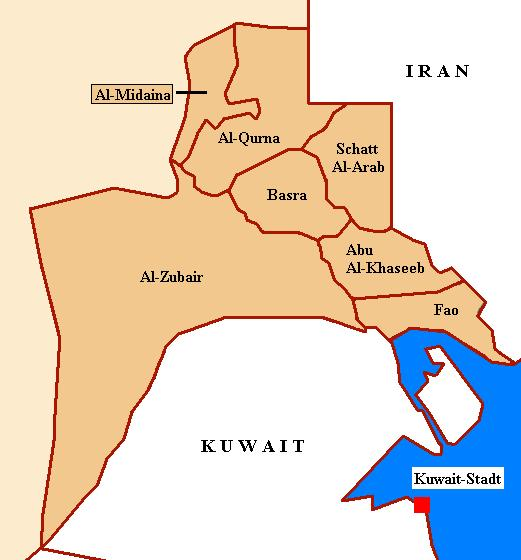
- Map of Basra Districts.
- Interactive map of Al-Zubair District
- Country: Iraq
- Governorates: Basra Governorate
- Seat: Al-Zubair

Area
  - Total: 9,061 km^{2} (3,498 sq mi)

Population (2018)
  - Total: 598,460
  - Density: 66.05/km^{2} (171.1/sq mi)
- Time zone: UTC+3 (AST)

Al-Zubair District (Arabic: قضاء الزبير) is a district in Basra Governorate, Iraq. It seat is the city of Al-Zubair. In the 1880s some Najd tribes immigrated to al-Zubair because Najd had nothing to offer, but around 1945s they returned to their home (Saudi Arabia) after it has changed notably. In the early 1990s, Saddam Hussein hoped to make al-Zubair province number 19 and annex it to Kuwait after invading. The failure of the Invasion of Kuwait put rest to this idea. The district is majority Shia Muslim with a sizable Sunni Muslim population.

The district is home to many Afro-Iraqi people.
