= Az Zubayr =

Az Zubayr الزبير
- City
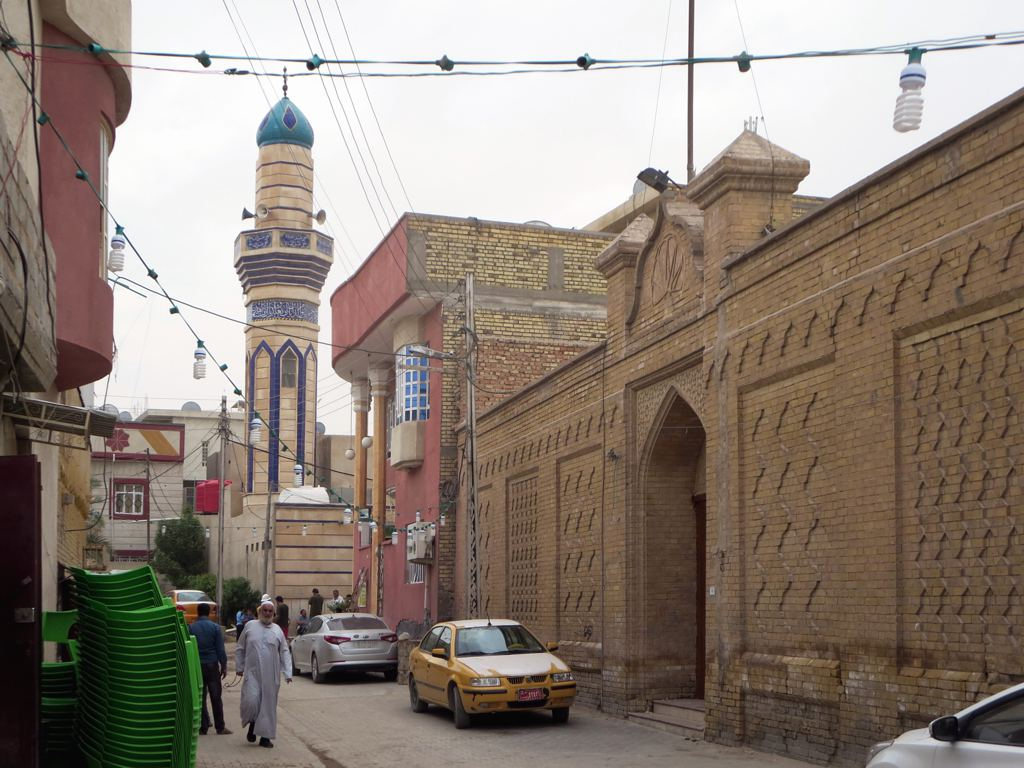

- Location within Iraq
- Coordinates: 30°23′N 47°42′E
- Country: Iraq
- Governorate: Basra
- District: Al-Zubayr

Population (2014)
  - Total: 370,000
  - Estimate (2018): 300,751
- Time zone: 3+
- Postal code: 61006
- Area code: 01

Az Zubayr (Arabic: الزبير) is a city in and the capital of Al-Zubayr District, part of the Basra Governorate of Iraq. The city is just south of Basra.

== History of Zubayr ==
=== Early history ===
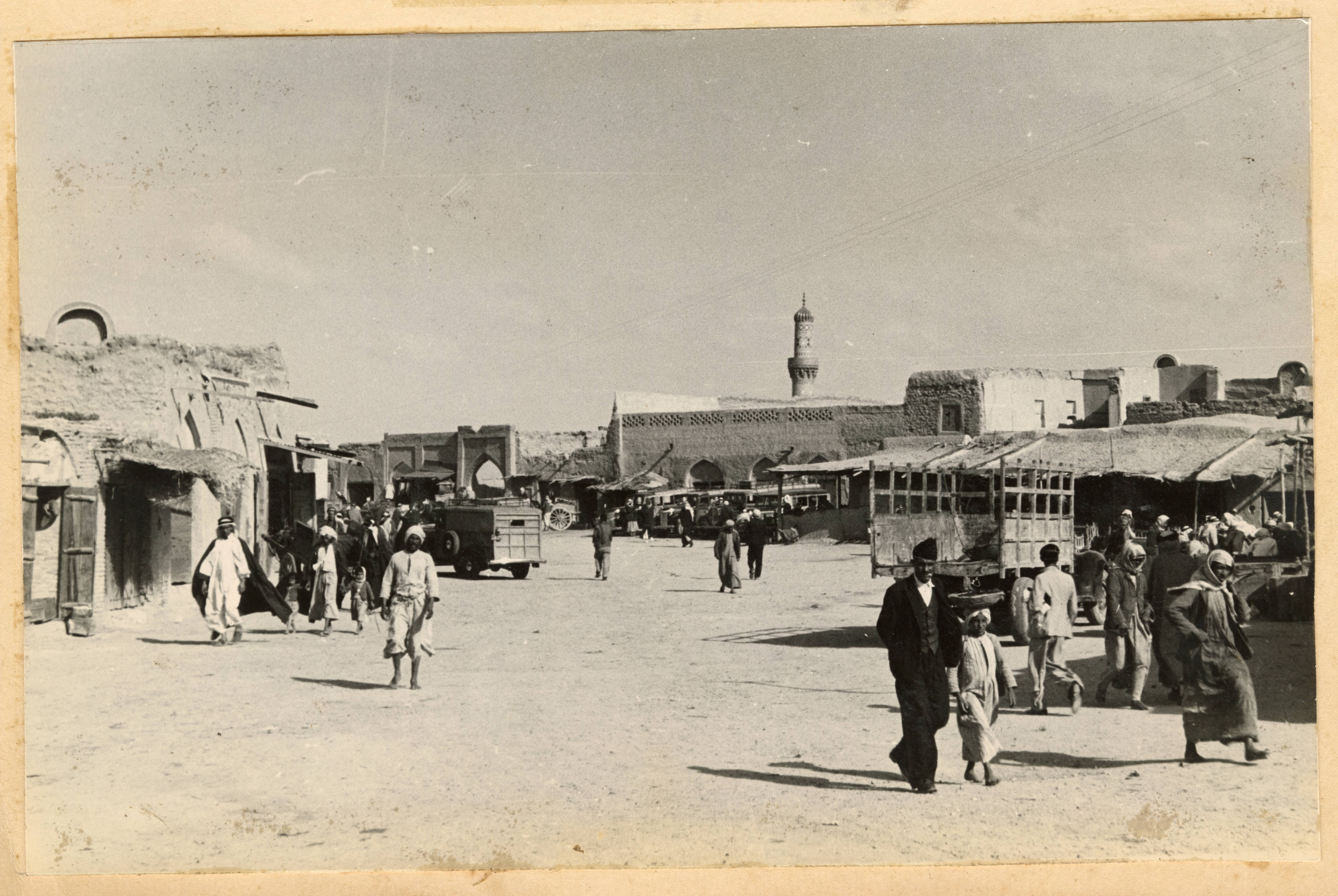
ca. 1942 street scene in Az Zubayr

The city was named al-Zubayr because one of the Sahaba (companions) of Muhammad, Zubayr ibn al-Awwam, was buried there.

The city had a large Najdi (now central Saudi Arabia) population who migrated for over four centuries. They built the first neighborhood, Al‑Kut, which still bears that name, establishing Zubair in 1003 AH as a Najdi settlement. The Najdis worked as merchants and the town expanded significantly, becoming larger and more developed than Kuwait.

=== 21st century ===
By 2008, the city of Zubayr had a population of around 240,000 people and had grown to merge into the Basra metropolitan area with nearly 3 million inhabitants in total. As in Basra, the municipality of Zubayr currently has a Shia majority and is barely distinguishable from Basra itself. But, contrary to Basra, Zubair is still home to a large Sunni minority and they are still living peacefully and in coexistence with the majority Shia Muslim population.

== Climate ==
Az Zubayr has a hot desert climate (Köppen climate classification BWh). In winter there is more rainfall than in summer. The average annual temperature in Az Zubayr is 24.5 °C (76.1 °F). About 139 mm (5.47 in) of precipitation falls annually.

Climate data for Az Zubayr
Month	Jan	Feb	Mar	Apr	May	Jun	Jul	Aug	Sep	Oct	Nov	Dec	Year
Mean daily maximum °C (°F)	17.5 (63.5)	19.9 (67.8)	24.8 (76.6)	31.1 (88.0)	37.2 (99.0)	40.9 (105.6)	43.1 (109.6)	43.6 (110.5)	41.0 (105.8)	35.4 (95.7)	26.7 (80.1)	19.4 (66.9)	31.7 (89.1)
Mean daily minimum °C (°F)	6.5 (43.7)	8.0 (46.4)	12.2 (54.0)	17.0 (62.6)	23.1 (73.6)	25.7 (78.3)	27.6 (81.7)	26.5 (79.7)	22.7 (72.9)	18.2 (64.8)	13.2 (55.8)	8.1 (46.6)	17.4 (63.3)
Average precipitation mm (inches)	26 (1.0)	18 (0.7)	17 (0.7)	15 (0.6)	6 (0.2)	0 (0)	0 (0)	0 (0)	0 (0)	2 (0.1)	22 (0.9)	33 (1.3)	139 (5.5)
Source: Climate-Data.org, Climate data
