= Road in the Woods (Constant Troyon) =

Painting by Constant Troyon

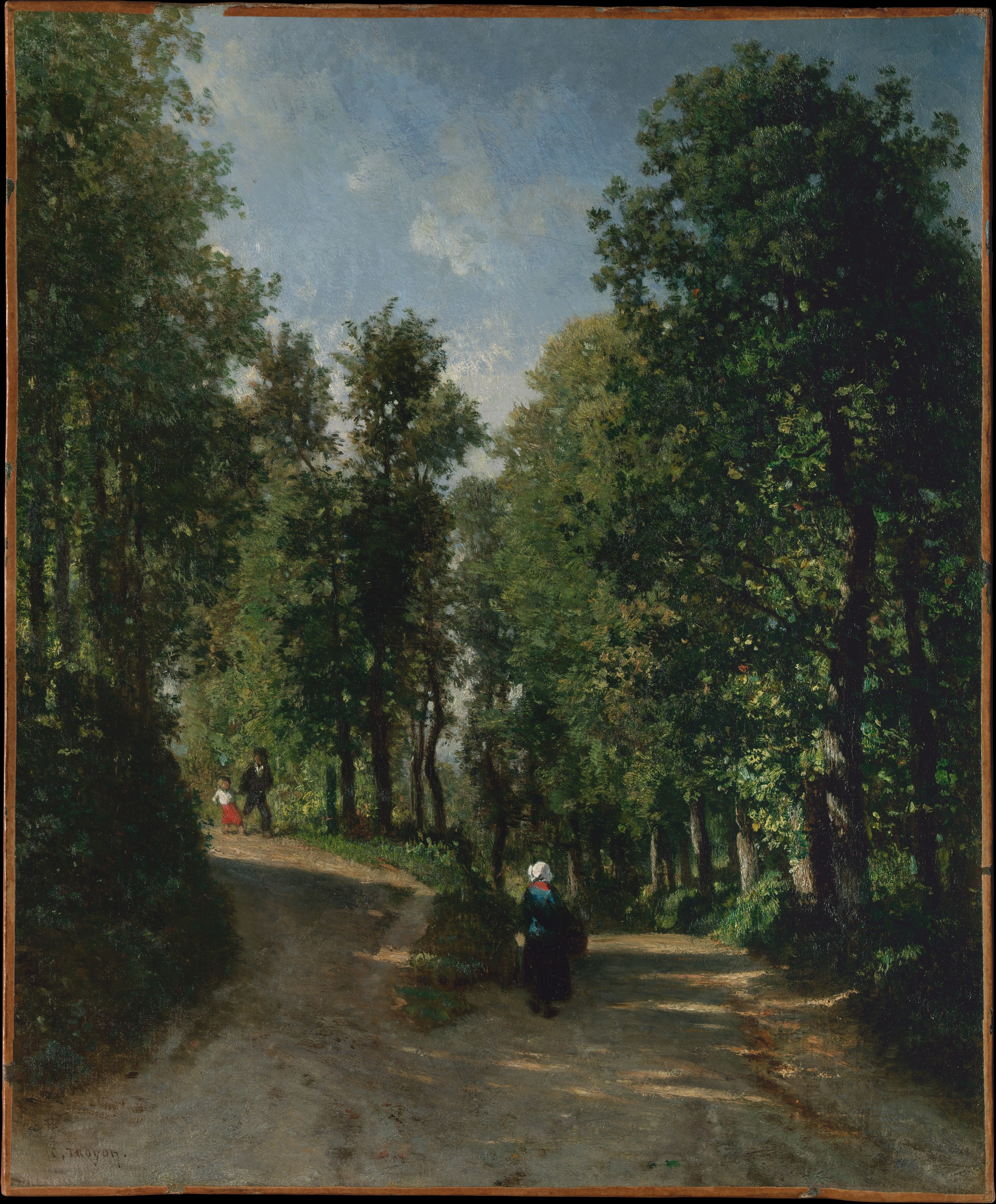
- Artist: Constant Troyon
- Year: c. 1840s
- Medium: Oil on canvas
- Dimensions: 58.1 cm × 48.3 cm (22.9 in × 19.0 in)
- Location: Metropolitan Museum of Art; New York

Road in the Woods is a 19th-century painting by French painter Constant Troyon. Done in oil on canvas, the work depicts two dirt roads heading through a wooded area. Troyon, a member of the Barbizon school, was inspire to render woods in such a way by 17th century Dutch landscape painters. Road in the Woods is in the collection of the Metropolitan Museum of Art.
