= Constant Troyon =

French painter (1810–1865)

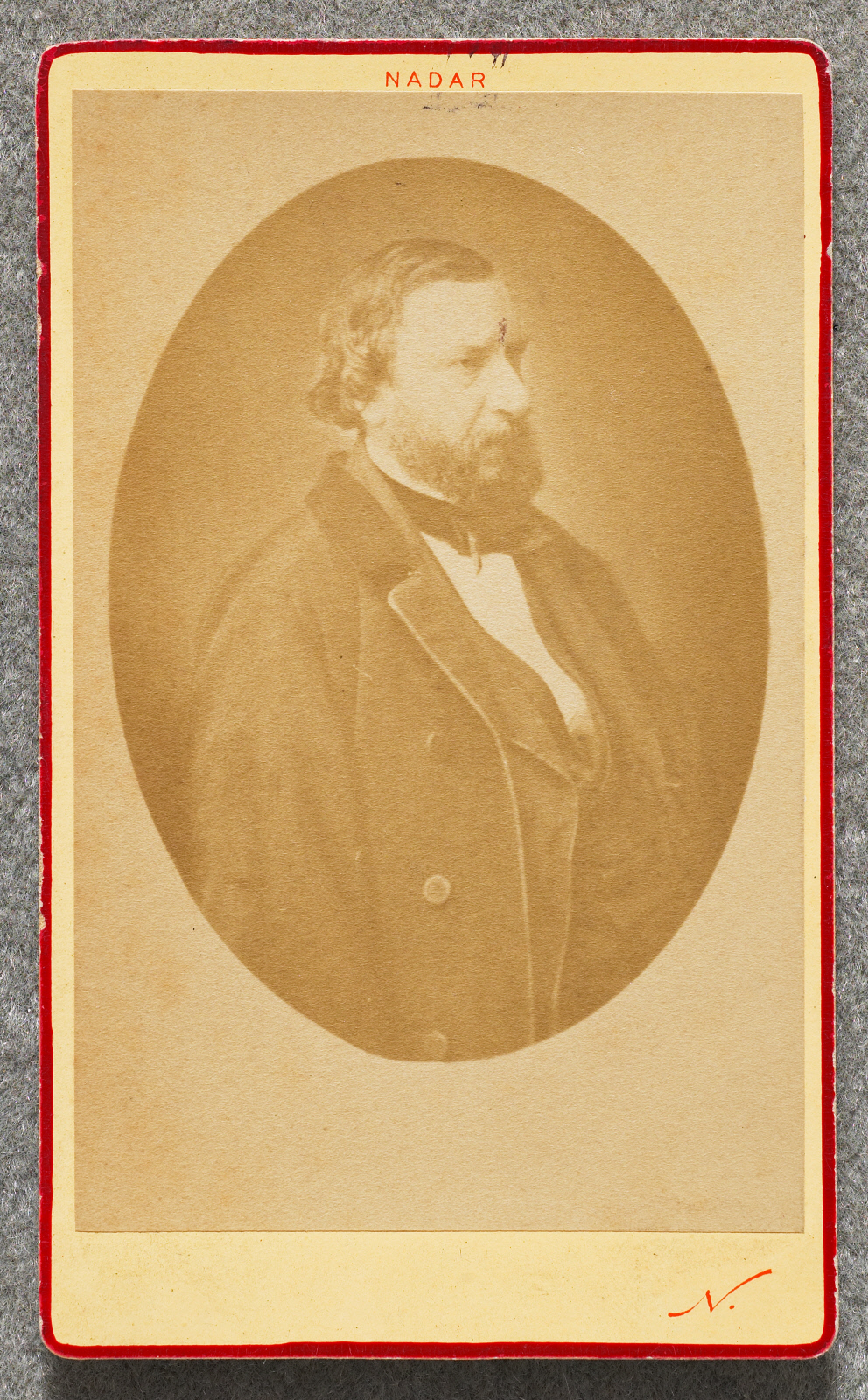
An 1856 Carte-de-Visite of Troyon by the French photographer Nadar, albumen print from glass negative, Clark Art Institute, Williamstown

Constant Troyon (French pronunciation: [kɔ̃stɑ̃ tʁwajɔ̃]; August 28, 1810 – February 21, 1865) was a French painter of the Barbizon school. In the early part of his career, he painted mostly landscapes. It was only comparatively late in life that Troyon found his métier as a painter of animals, and achieved international recognition.

== Early years ==
He was born in Sèvres, near Paris, where his father was connected with the famous manufactory of porcelain. Troyon entered the ateliers very young as a decorator, and until he was twenty, he labored assiduously at the minute details of porcelain ornamentation; and this kind of work he mastered so thoroughly that it was many years before he overcame its limitations. By the time he reached twenty-one, he was travelling the country as an artist, and painting landscapes so long as his finances lasted. Then when pressed for money, he made friends with the first china manufacturer he met and worked steadily at his old business of decorator until he had accumulated enough funds to permit him to start again on his wanderings.

== Later development ==
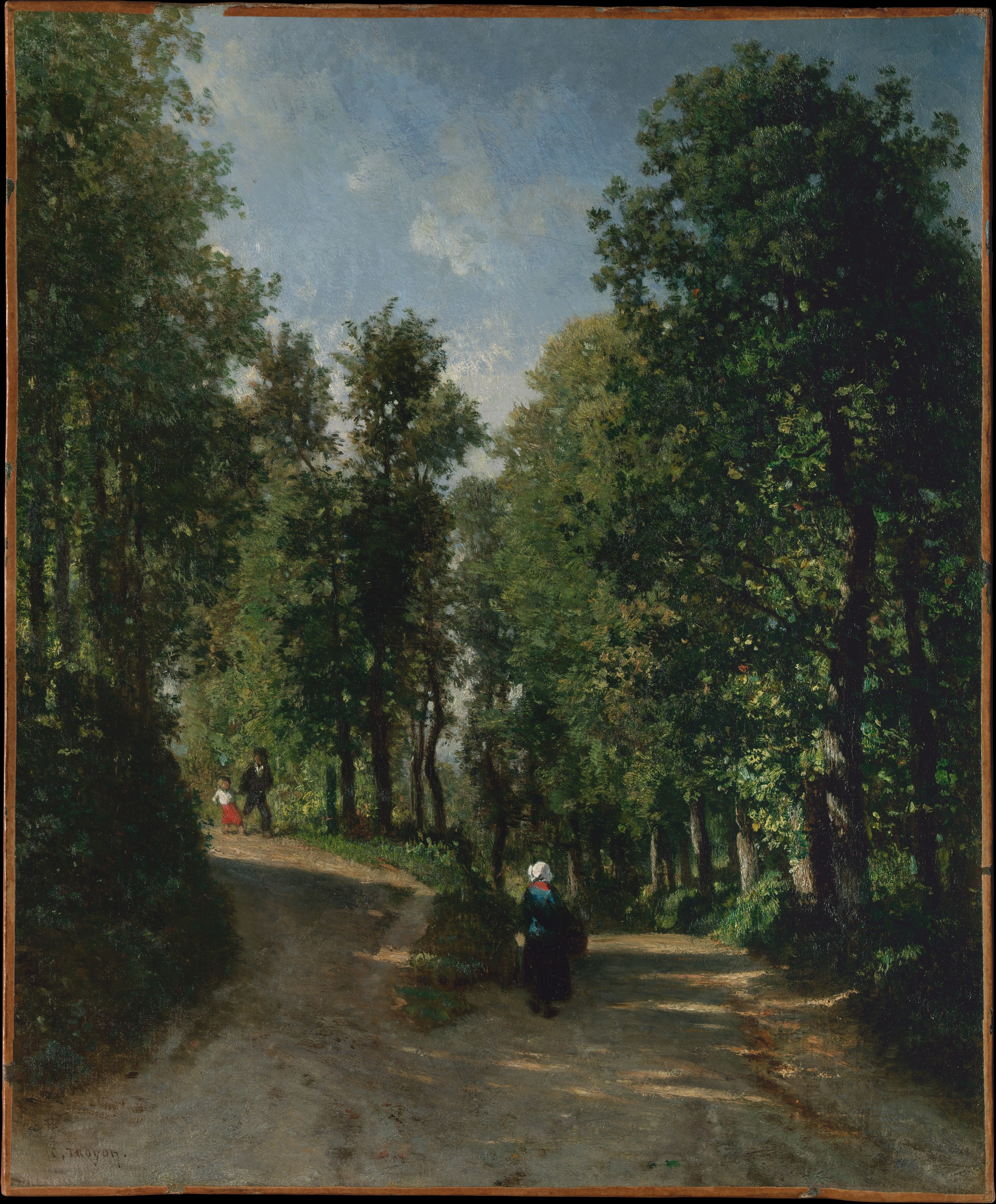
Road in the Woods, circa 1840s, Metropolitan Museum of Art

Troyon was a favorite with Camille Roqueplan, an artist of distinction eight years his senior, and he became one of his pupils after receiving certain tuition from a painter, now quite unknown, named Alfred Riocreux. Roqueplan introduced Troyon to Rousseau, Jules Dupré, and the other Barbizon painters, and in his pictures between 1840 and 1847, he seemed to endeavour to follow in their footsteps.

But as a landscapist Troyon would never have been recognized as a thorough master, although his work of the period is marked with much sincerity and met with a certain success. It may be pointed out, however, that in one or two pure landscapes of the end of his life, he achieved qualities of the highest artistic kind; but this was after lengthy experience as a cattle painter, by which his talents had become thoroughly developed.

In 1846, Troyon went to the Netherlands, and at the Hague saw Paulus Potter's famous "Young Bull". From the studies he made of this picture, of Cuyp's sunny landscapes, and Rembrandt's noble masterpieces he soon evolved a new method of painting, and it is only in works produced after this time that Troyon's true individuality is revealed. When he became conscious of his power as an animal painter he developed with rapidity and success, until his works became recognized as masterpieces in Britain and America, as well as in all countries of the European Continent.

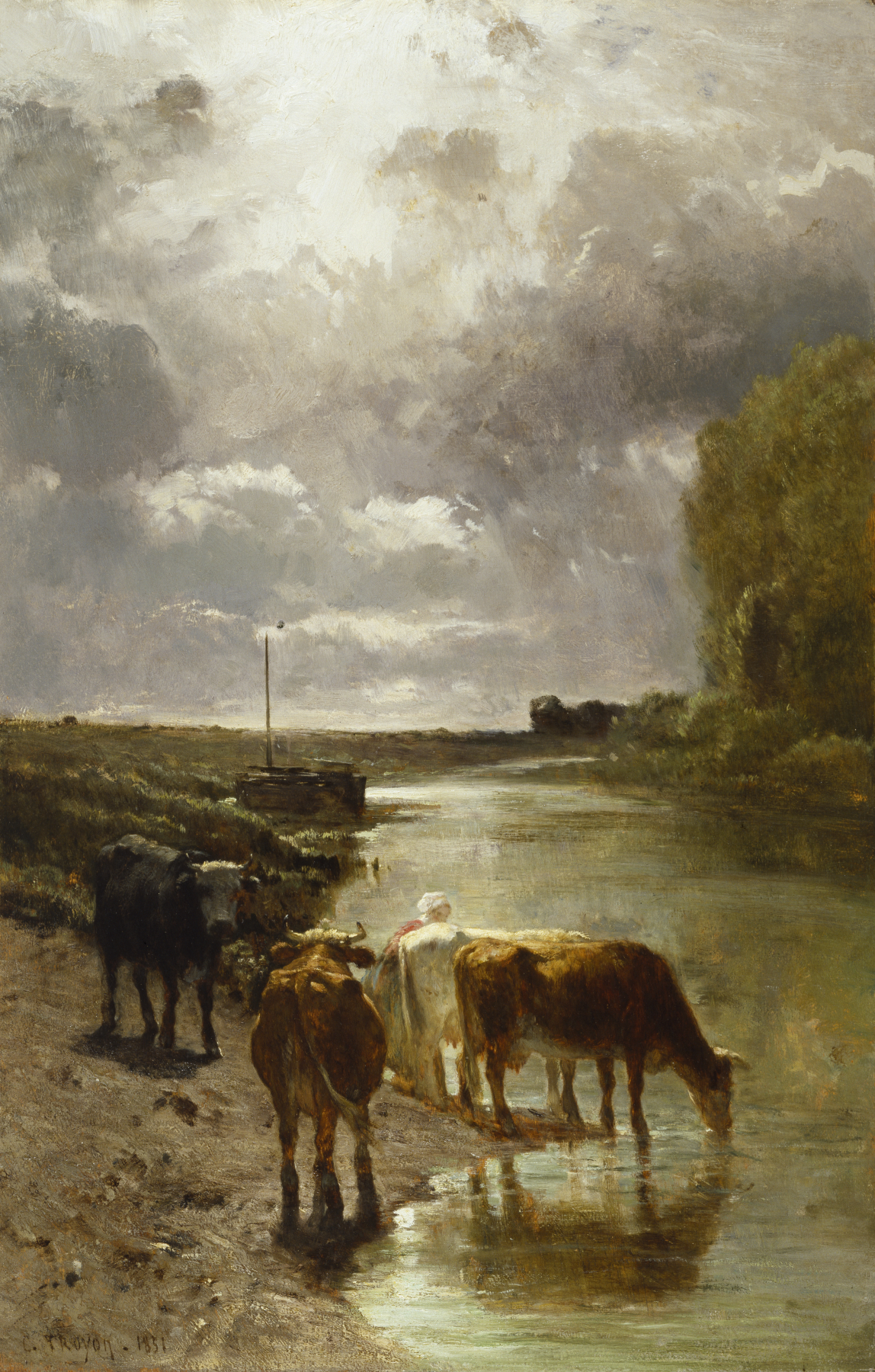
This painting of 1850 depicts 'Cattle drinking' on the banks of the Touques River in Normandy. The Walters Art Museum.

The art critic Albert Wolff wrote about this period of Troyon, after the exhibition "Cent Chefs-d'Oeuvres" in Paris, 1886: "It was accident and a journey to Holland which revealed to Troyon his true mission, that of an animal painter of the first rank ... At a distance of two centuries Troyon continued the traditions of the celebrated Dutch animal painters without imitating them. Paul Potter was to find a successor worthy of him ... Fancy the astonishment at the sight of Troyon's animals, with their large life, their broad brush-work in deep, pure colors, studied with a discriminating sympathy for every race and species, and moving through landscapes of a master's creation. These were not the fashionable stuffed beasts, but living, moving herds, stretching themselves luxuriously in the sun, breathing the breezes cool with morning, or huddling close together at the approach of the storm."

Success, however, came too late, for Troyon never quite believed in it himself, and even when he could command the market of several countries he still grumbled loudly at the way the world treated him. Yet he was decorated with the Legion of Honour, and five times received medals at the Paris Salon, while Napoleon III was one of his patrons; and it is certain he was at least as financially successful as his Barbizon colleagues.

Troyon died, unmarried, at Paris on 21 February 1865, after a term of clouded intellect. He was buried in the Cimetière de Montmartre in the Montmartre Quarter of Paris.

== Recognition ==
All his famous pictures are of date between 1850 and 1864, his earlier work being of comparatively little value. His mother, who survived him, instituted the Troyon prize for animal pictures at the École des Beaux Arts. Troyon's work is fairly well known to the public through a number of large engravings from his pictures. In the Wallace Gallery in London are "Watering Cattle" and "Cattle in Stormy Weather"; in the Glasgow Corporation Gallery is a "Landscape with Cattle"; the Louvre contains his famous "Oxen at Work" and "Returning to the Farm"; while the Metropolitan Museum of Art and other galleries in America contain fine examples of his pictures. His "Vallée de la Toucque, Normandy", is one of his greatest pictures; and at Christie's sale-room in 1902 the single figure of a cow in a landscape of but moderate quality fetched £7350. Émile van Marcke (1827–1891) was his best-known pupil.

== Gallery ==
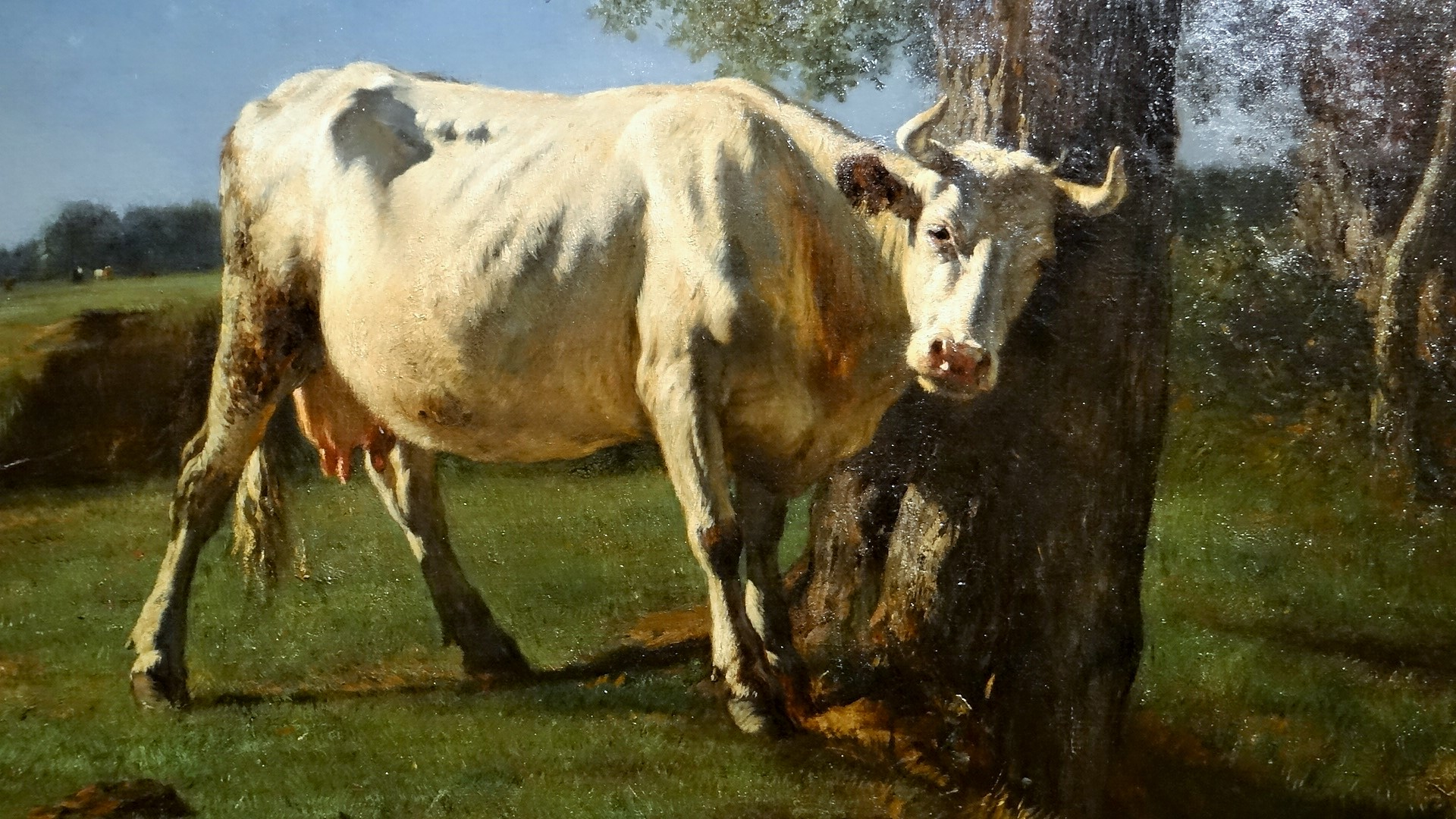
Scratching Cow, c. 1858; oil on canvas

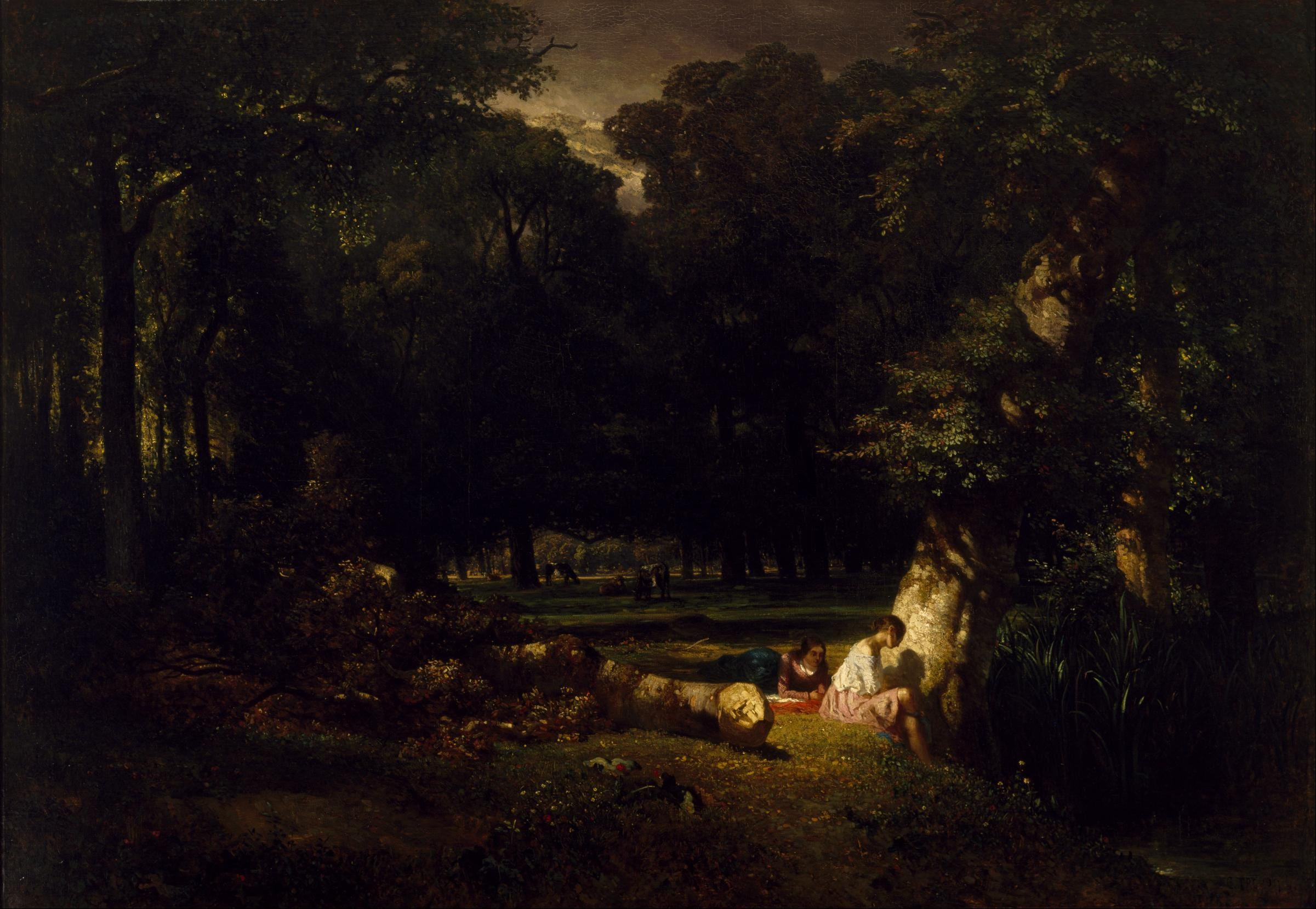
The Bathers (Clearing in the Forest), 1842; oil-painting on canvas

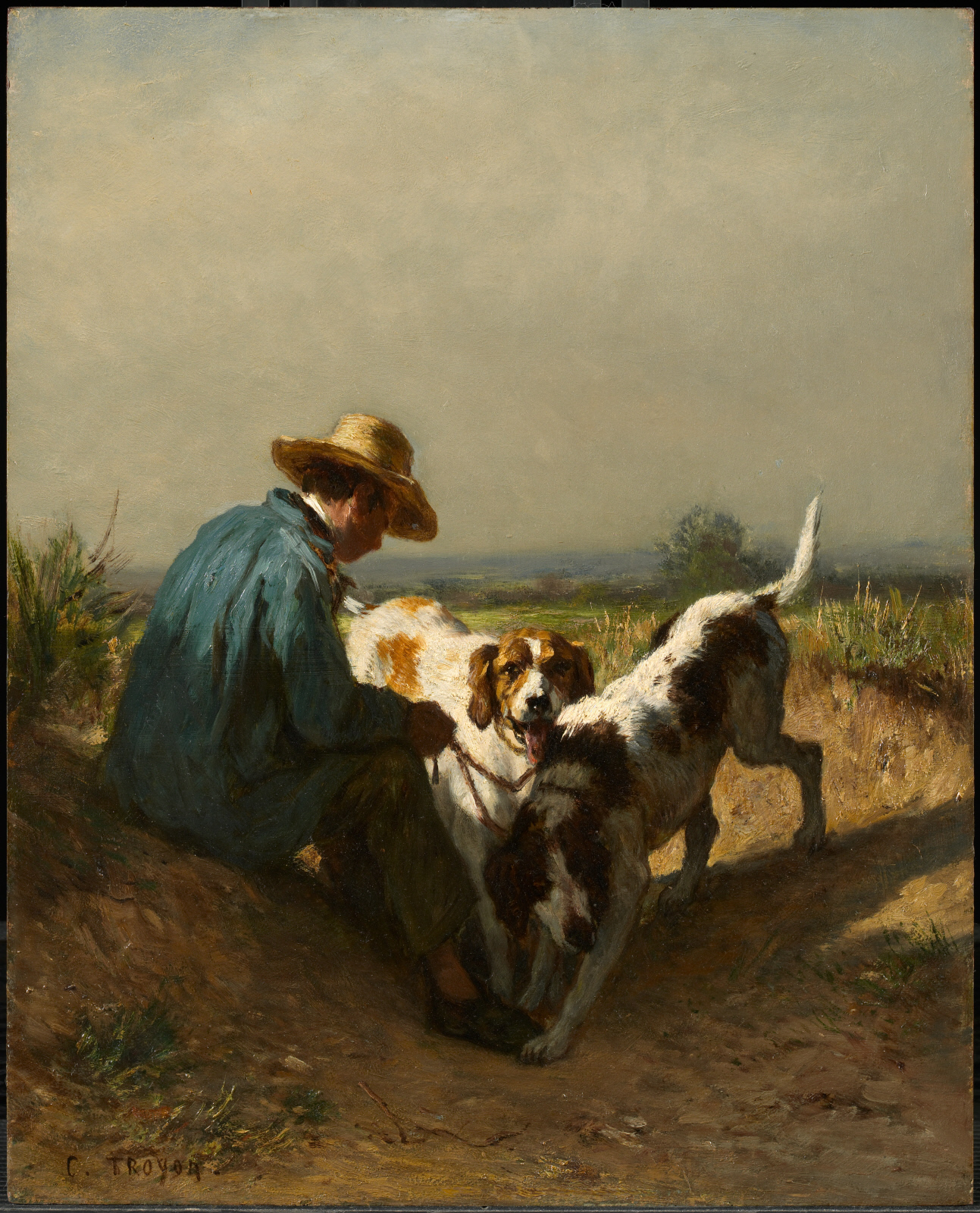
The Gamekeeper, 1850s, Clark Art Institute, Williamstown

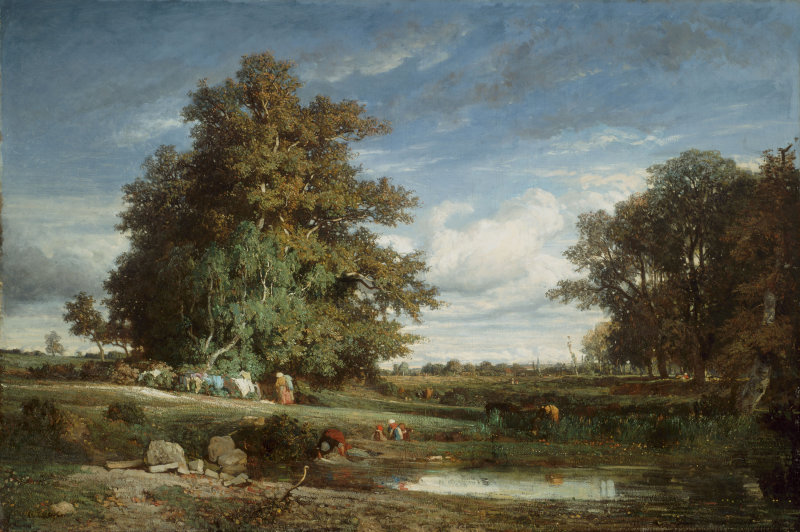
The Marsh, 1840; oil-painting

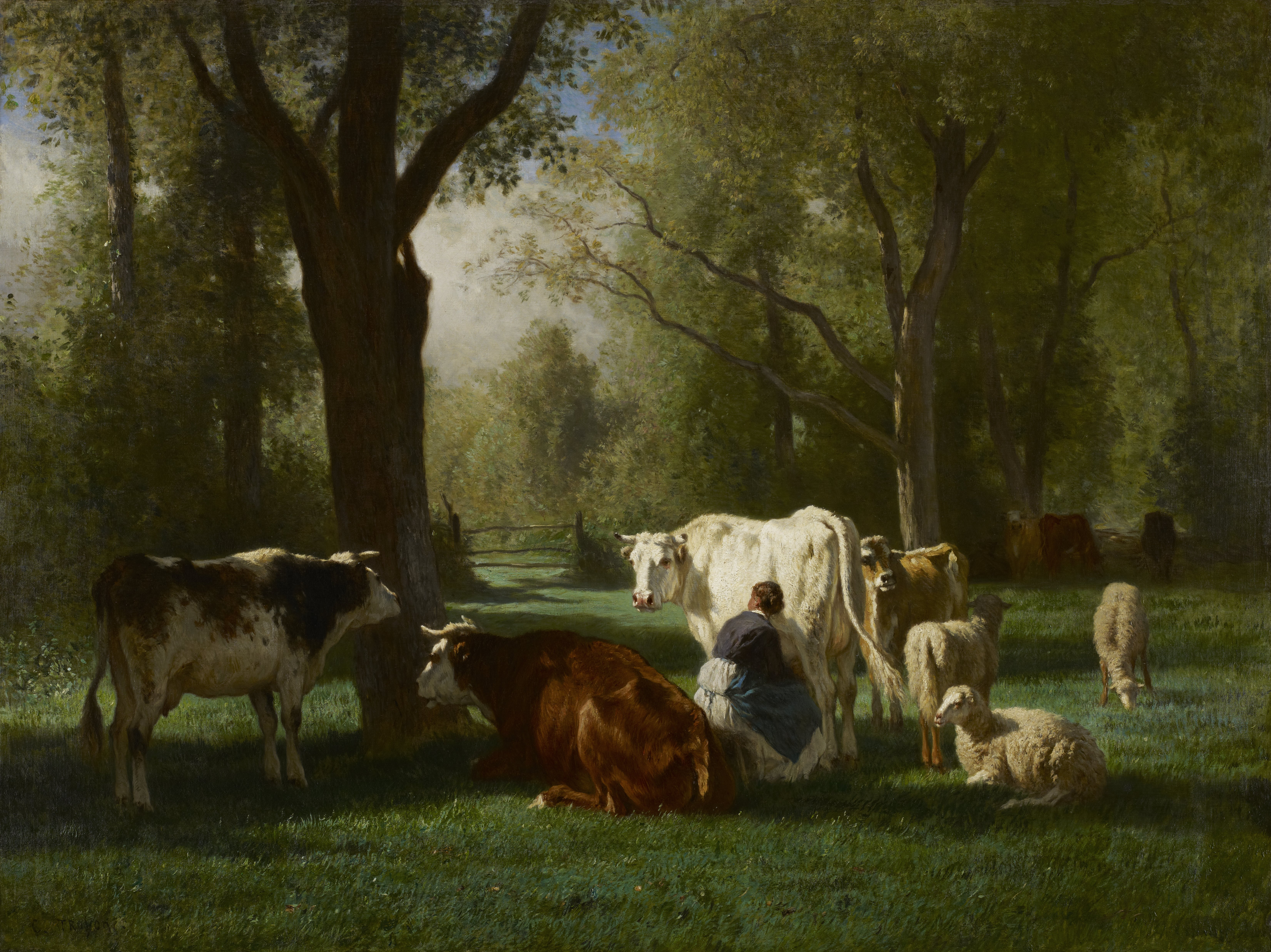
Landscape with Cattle and Sheep, c. 1852–58; oil on canvas

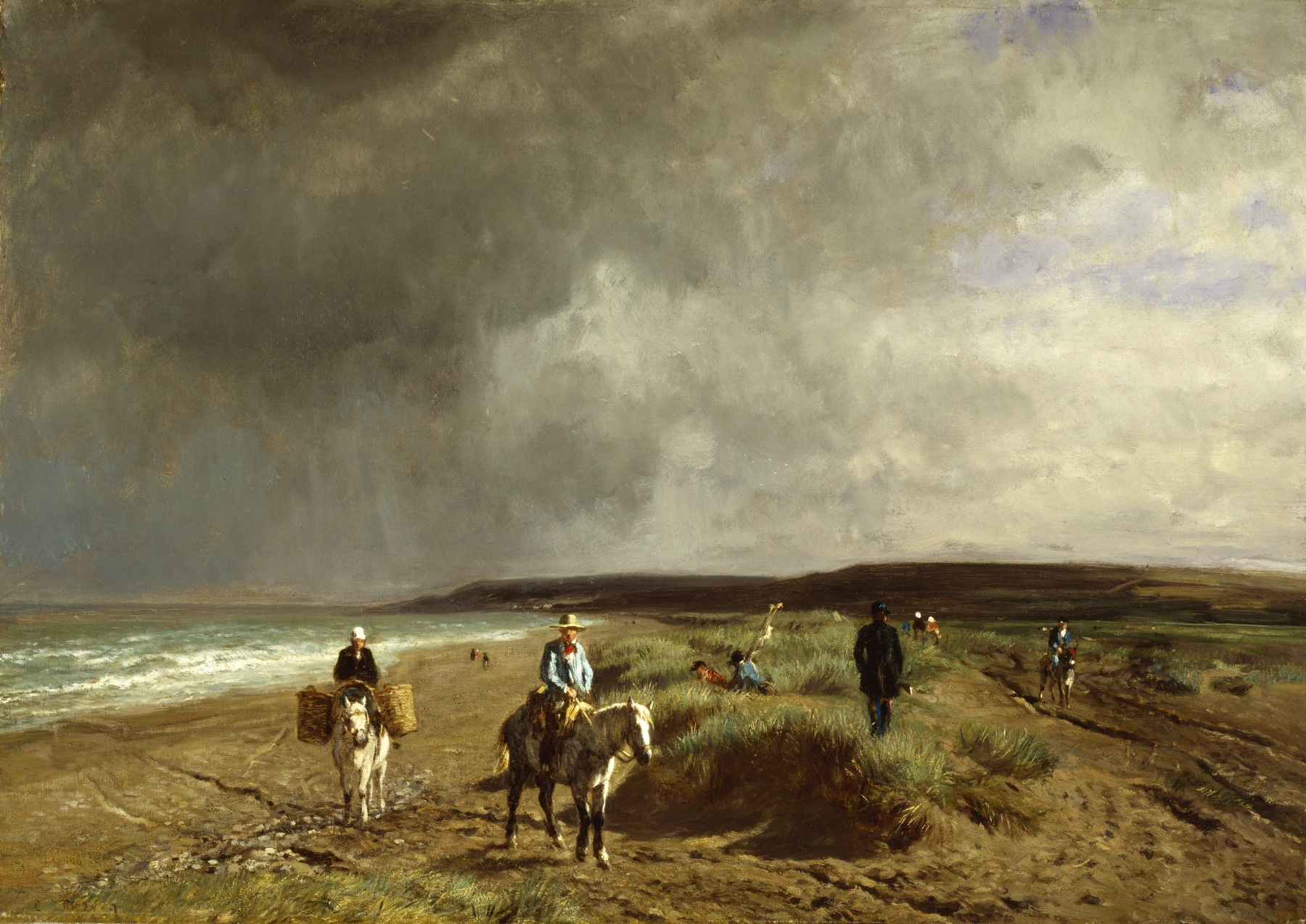
Coast near Villers, 1859; oil-painting on canvas

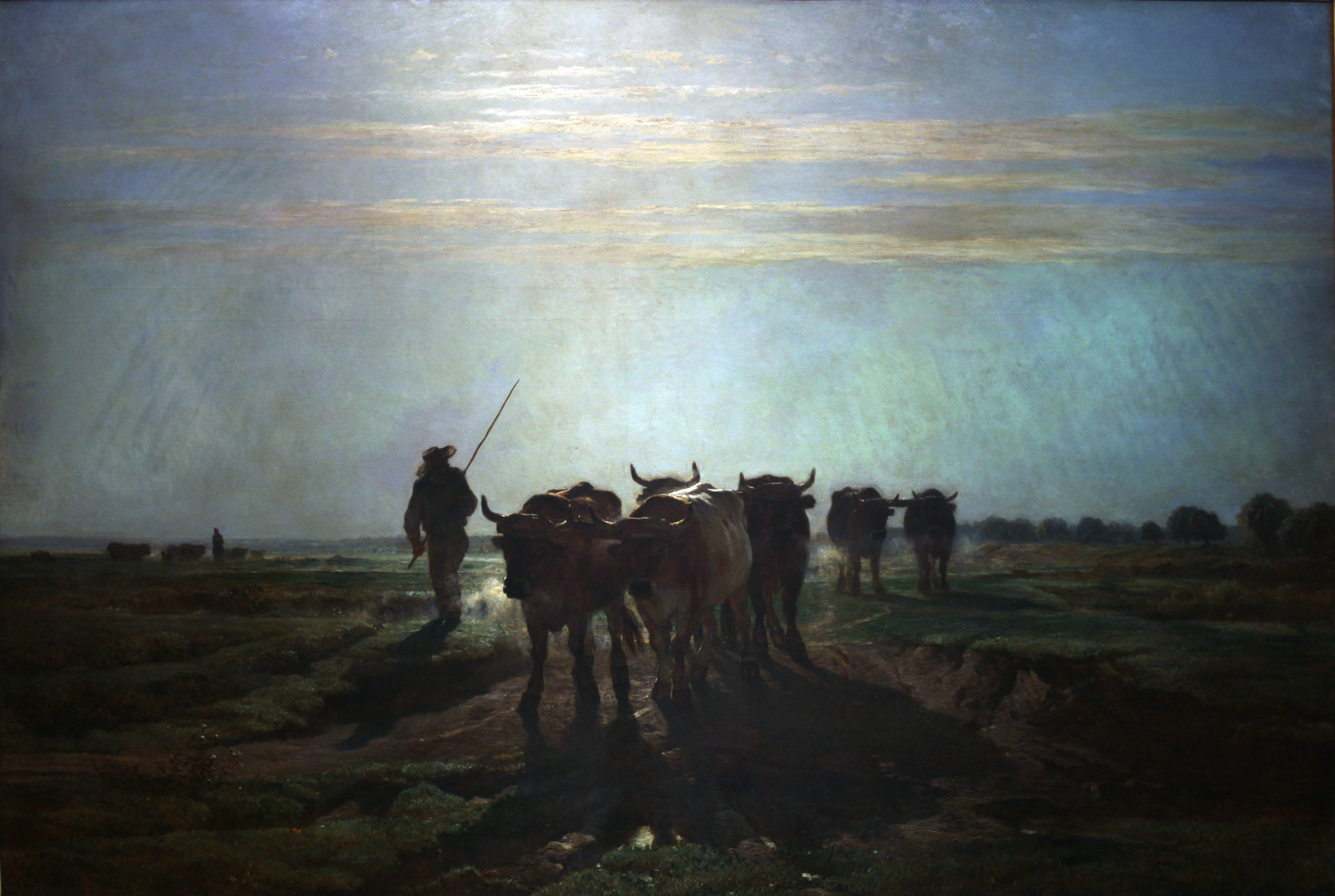
Oxes watching to tillage, morning sky, 1855; oil on canvas

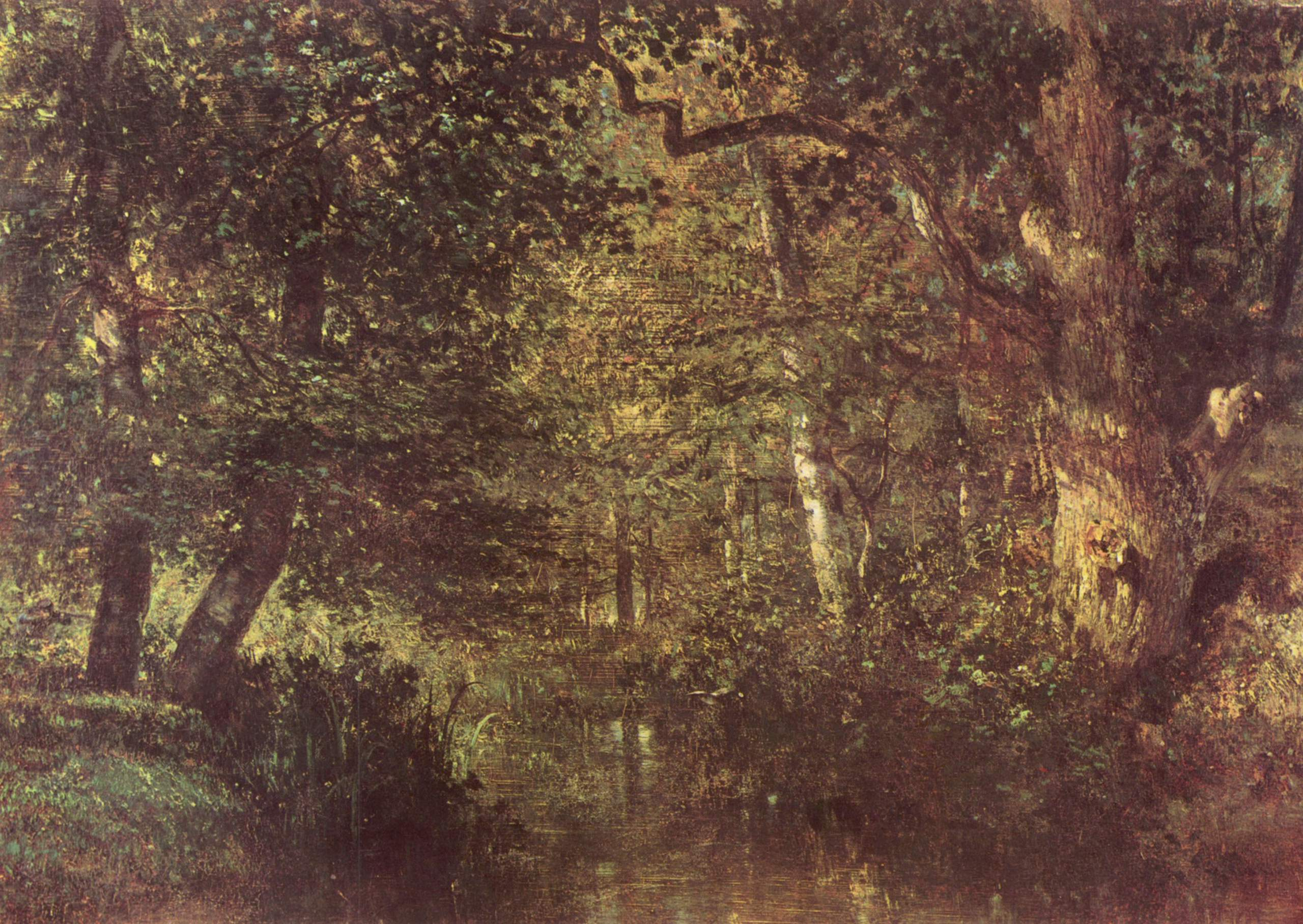
Brook through the Forest, c. 1860; oil on canvas
