= Albert Charpin =

French painter

- Born: 30 January 1842; Grasse, France
- Died: 1924 (aged 81–82); Asnières-sur-Seine, France
- Notable work: Troupeau dans la Camargue, Soir d’automne en Sologne, Le soir dans les Alpes Maritimes, Tropeau fayant l’or
- Movement: Barbizon school

Albert Charpin (1842–1924) was a French painter.

Albert Charpin was born in Grasse, Alpes-Maritimes, France in 1842.

He was a naturalist painter associated with the Barbizon school. He painted real objects in a natural setting. A pupil of Charles-François Daubigny, Charpin was a painter of natural landscapes with, typically, a shepherdess and her guardian-dog taking care of animals, cows or sheep. Characteristic of his paintings are the natural poses and serenity of his actors, in a context of early morning light, with cloudy skies. He was a well-known member of the Barbizon School.

Charpin died in Asnières-sur-Seine, France in 1924.

One of his paintings, "Le Retour à la Ferme", is at the Musée des Beaux-Arts at Chambéry in Savoie. His paintings can also found in museums and private collections elsewhere in Europe and in the Americas.

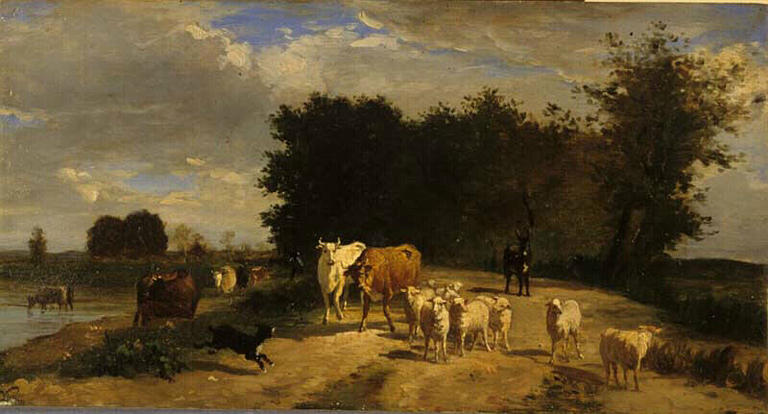
Albert Charpin "Le Retour à la Ferme"

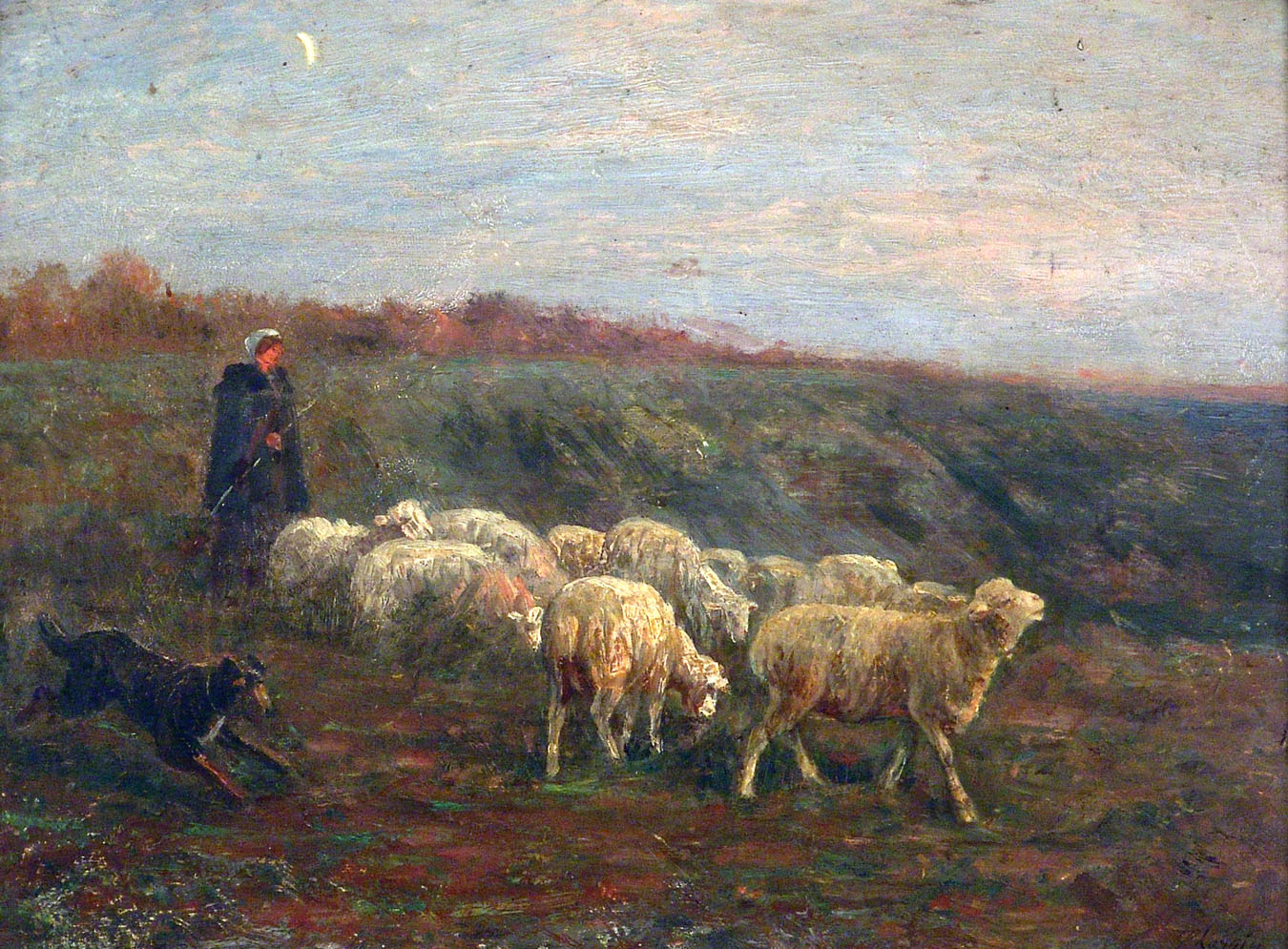
Albert Charpin "Woman with Lambs"
