= Émile van Marcke =

French painter (1827–1890)

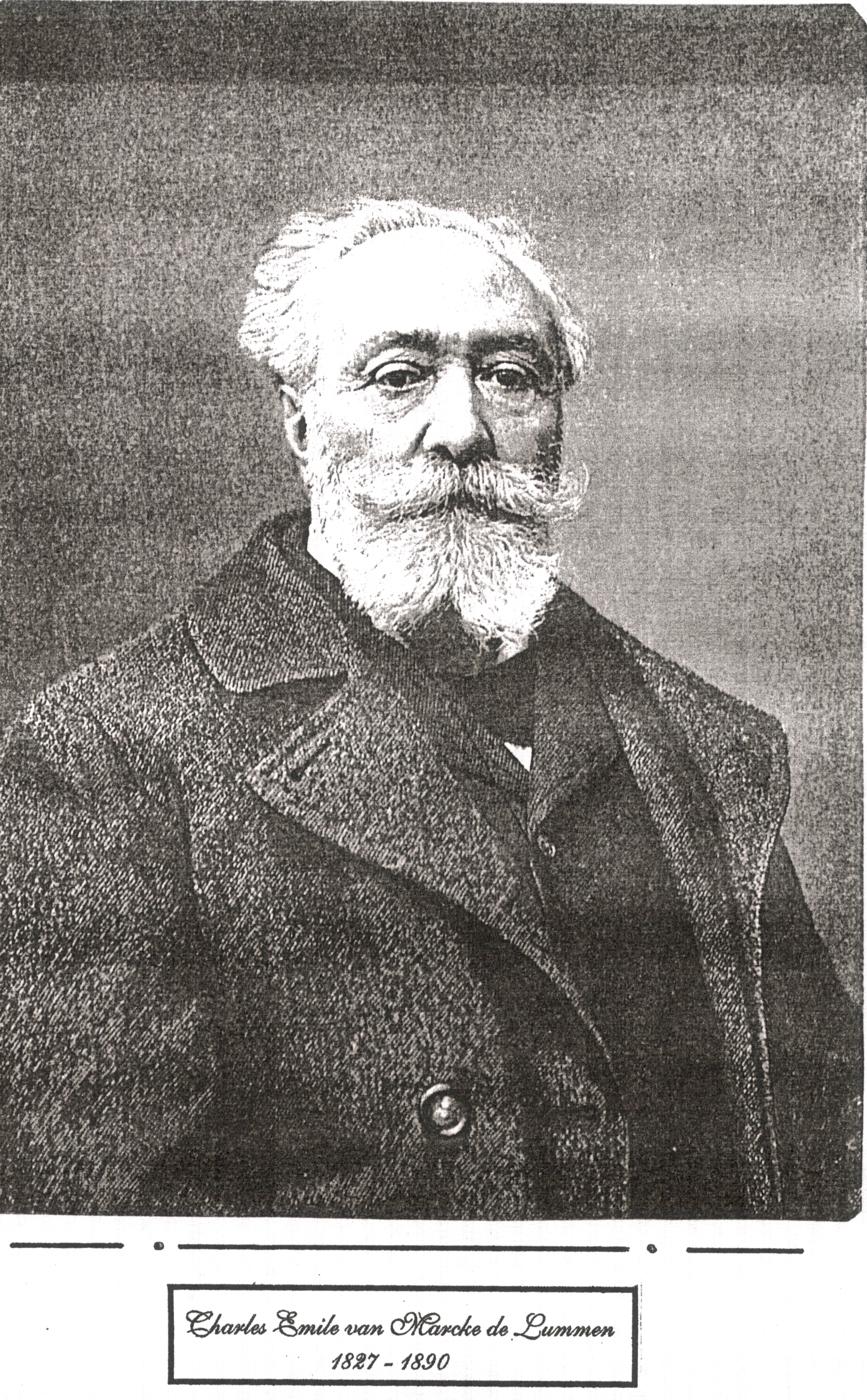
Charles Émile van Marcke de Lummen

Émile van Marcke, born Charles Émile van Marcke de Lummen (15 August 1827 in Sèvres – 24 December 1890 in Hyeres), was a French cattle painter.

== Biography ==
He studied under Troyon at Barbizon. He received the cross of the Legion of Honor in 1872 and a gold medal at the Paris exhibition. He is represented at the Louvre and other museums of France, and at the Metropolitan Museum in New York, The John and Mable Ringling Museum of Art in Sarasota, Florida, and in other public and private collections in the United States. Typical of his work is the public domain image Summer Pastoral, Bresle Valley on this page reproduced courtesy of the Morton Collection. This gem-like work offers the favorite themes of van Marcke in a microcosm; it incorporates cattle, water, reflections, dramatic cloudscapes and a feeling of life and motion and verdant nature. Nature is idyllic and animals emblematic of that harmony.
