= Charles Olivier de Penne =

French painter (1831–1897)

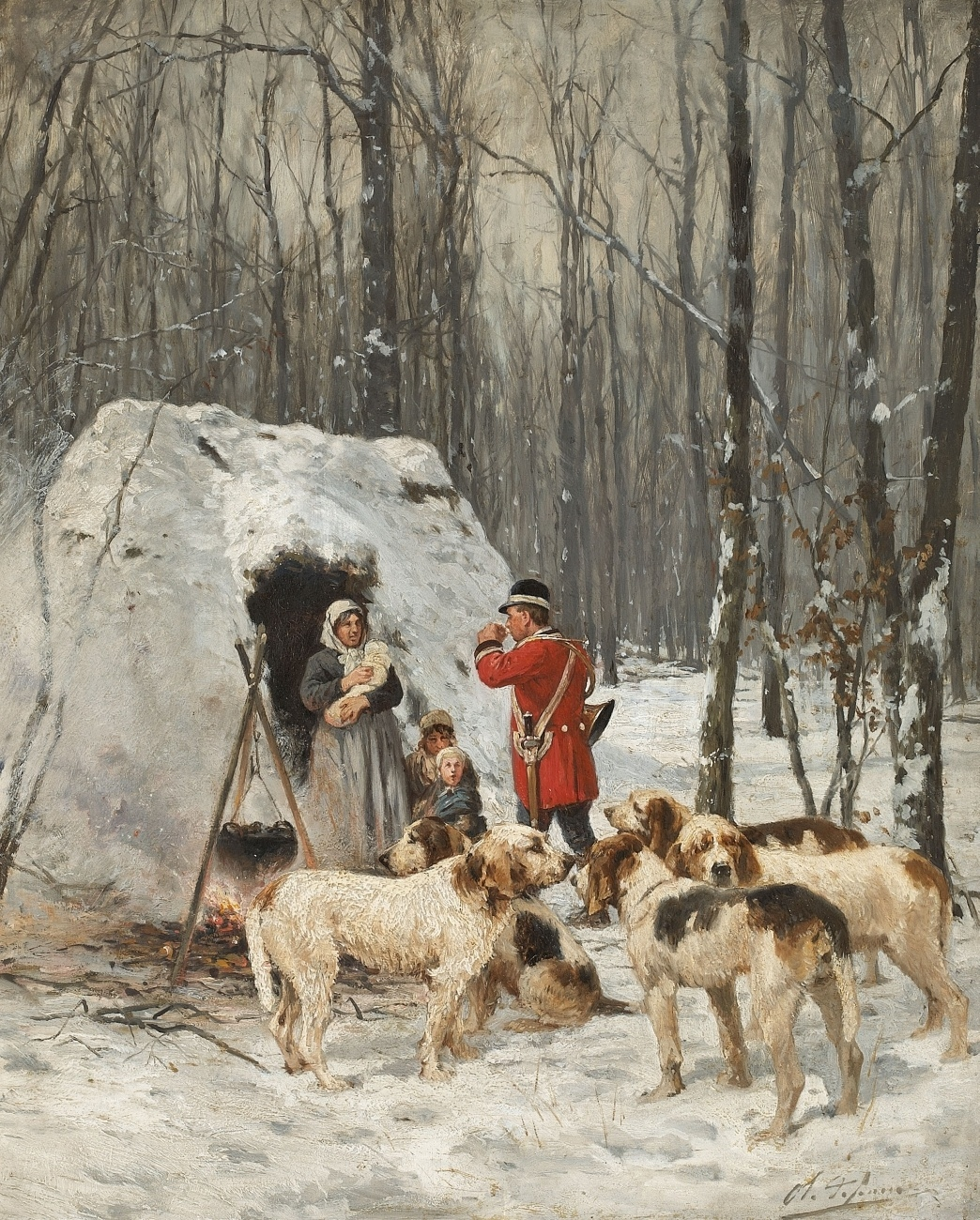
Charles Olivier de Penne Hunting scene in winter

Charles Olivier de Penne (Paris, January 11, 1831 - Bourron-Marlotte, April 18, 1897) was a French painter. He belonged to the School of Barbizon.

== Biography ==
Charles-Olivier de Penne was initially a painter of historical scenes, but, as soon as he came into contact with the school of Barbizon, he switched to landscape painting, in which he poured his passion for animals. He became famous for his paintings of hunting scenes or landscapes with animals.

He attempted the grand Prix de Rome in 1857, but only got the second prize with the work Jésus et la Samaritaine. He then exhibited regularly at both the Paris Salon and the Salon des Artistes Français, where he won a bronze medal in 1872 and a silver medal in 1883. Another silver medal was awarded to him at the 1889 Expo.

== Main works in museums ==
- Le duc d'Orléans, chassant à courre au Bosquet de Sylvie en 1841, Condé museum.
- Hallali du cerf dans l'étang de Sylvie, Condé museum, Chantilly.
- Relais de chiens, "Vénerie de Senlis" museum.
- Chiens au repos, museum of Rennes.
- Chiens courants, Liegi
- Chiens basset, Montréal

== Gallery ==
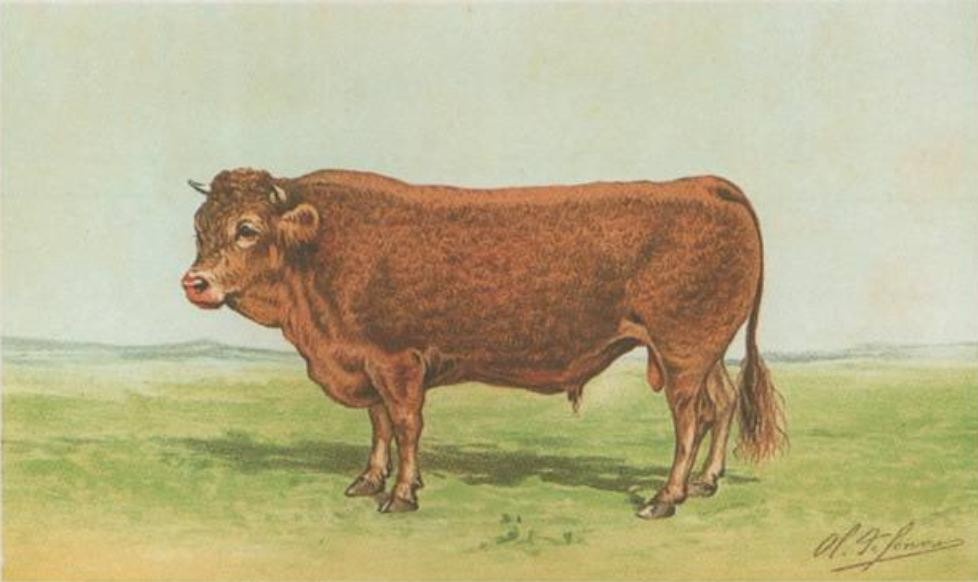
Toro di Limoges. Cromolitografia del 1891.

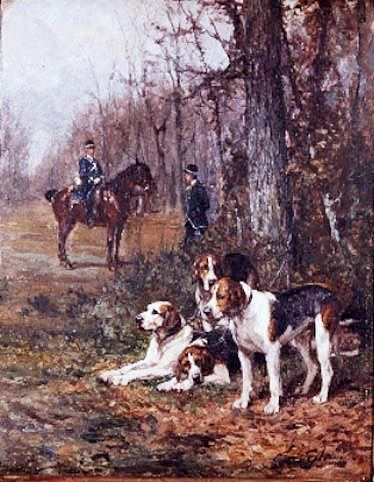
A caccia

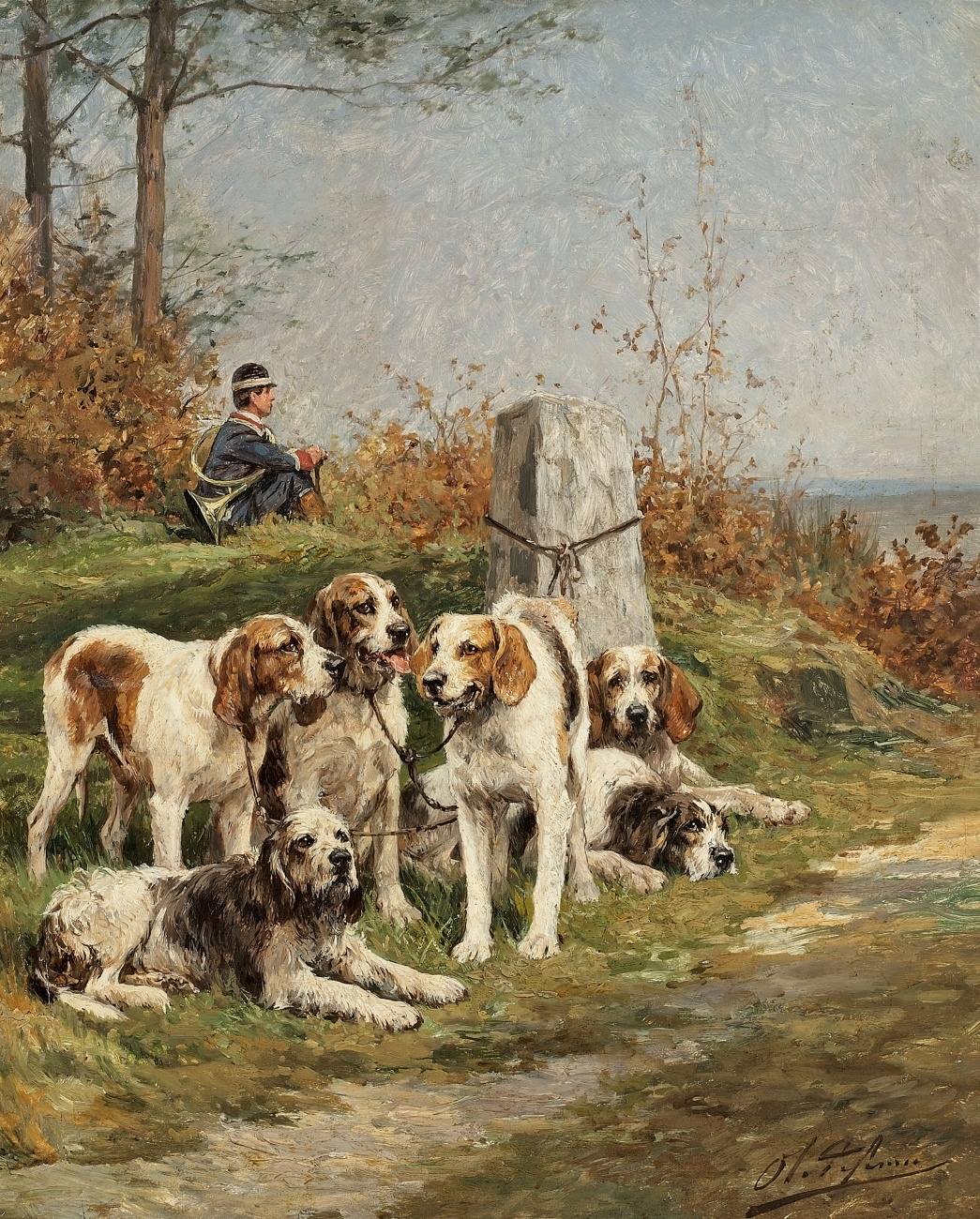
Scene di caccia in estate

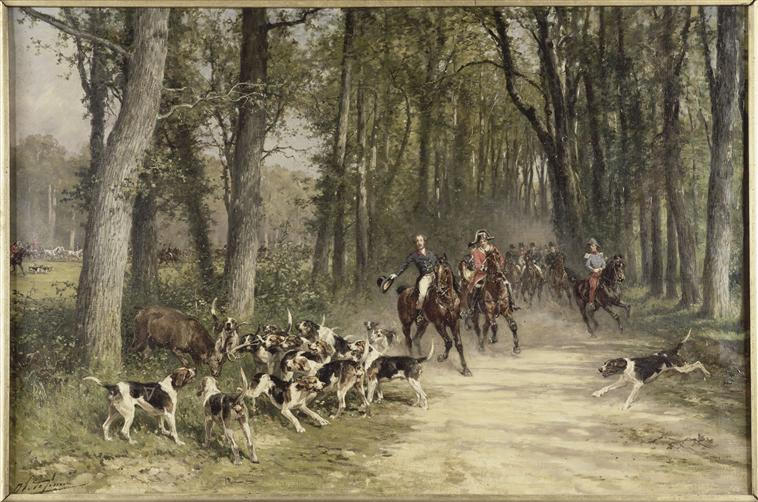
Il duca di Orléans alla caccia d'inseguimento

== Bibliography ==
- Guy de Laporte, Chasse à courre, chasse de cour, Edizione Renaissance Du Livre, 2004 - ISBN 9782804609085
- Claude Marumo, Charles Olivier de Penne, in Barbizon et les paysagistes du XIXe. Edizioni "de l'amateur", Parigi, 1975. OCLC 2165633

== Related articles ==
- Barbizon school
- Expo 1889

== Other projects ==
- Wikimedia Commons contiene immagini o altri file su Charles Olivier de Penne
