= Cows Crossing a Ford =

1836 painting by Jules Dupré

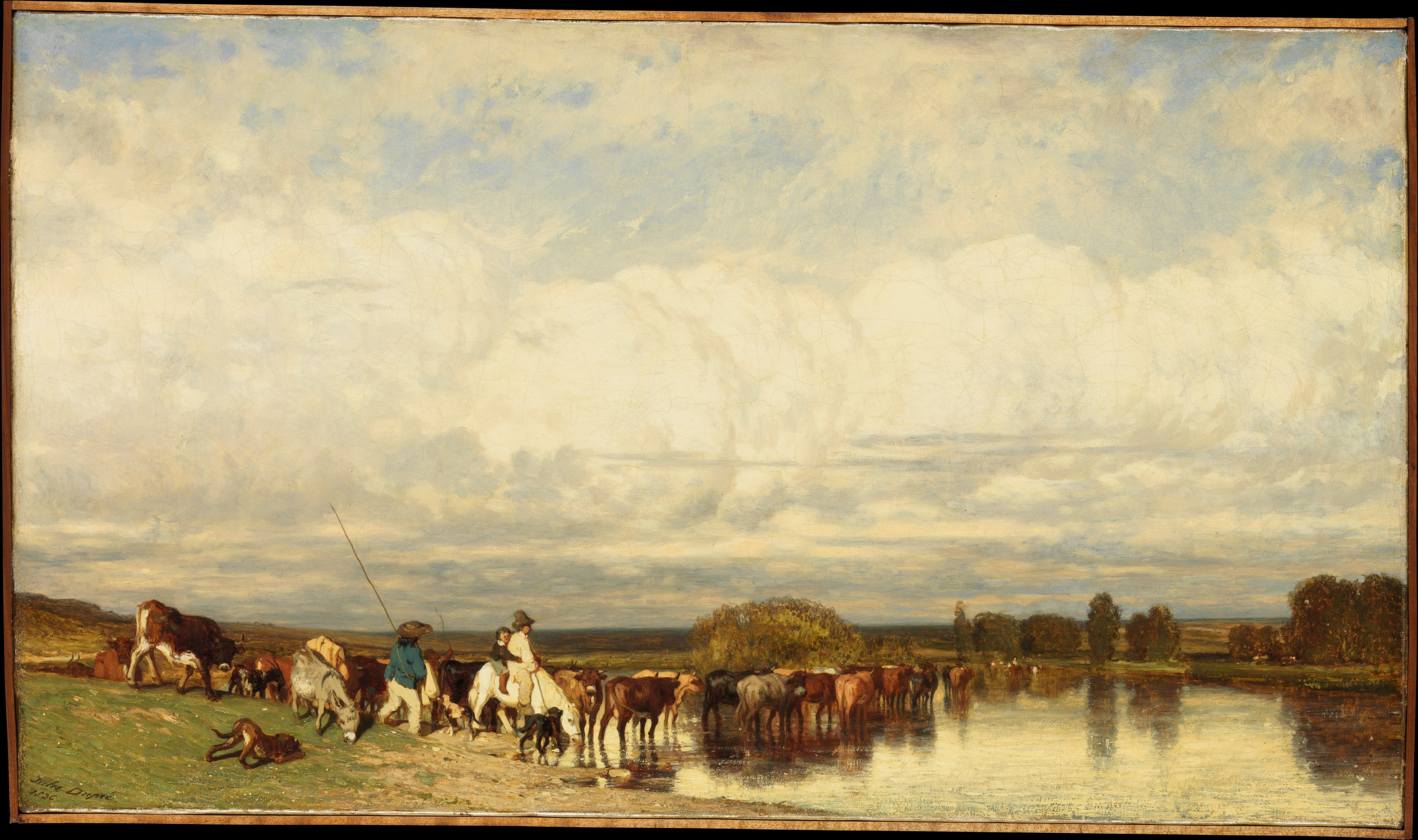
- Artist: Jules Dupré
- Year: 1836
- Medium: Oil on canvas
- Dimensions: 36.2 cm × 62.5 cm (14.3 in × 24.6 in)
- Location: Metropolitan Museum of Art; New York

Cows Crossing a Ford is an oil on canvas painting by French artist Jules Dupré, from 1836. It is in the collection of the Metropolitan Museum of Art, in New York.

The work depicts farmers driving their cattle across a river in Limousin, a region of central France. The way in which the low horizon and sky are rendered in the painting are a testament to Dupré's interest in the works of John Constable and Richard Parkes Bonington, two landscape painters. Cows Crossing a Ford is in the collection of the Metropolitan Museum of Art.
