= Barbizon School =

19th-century French artistic movement

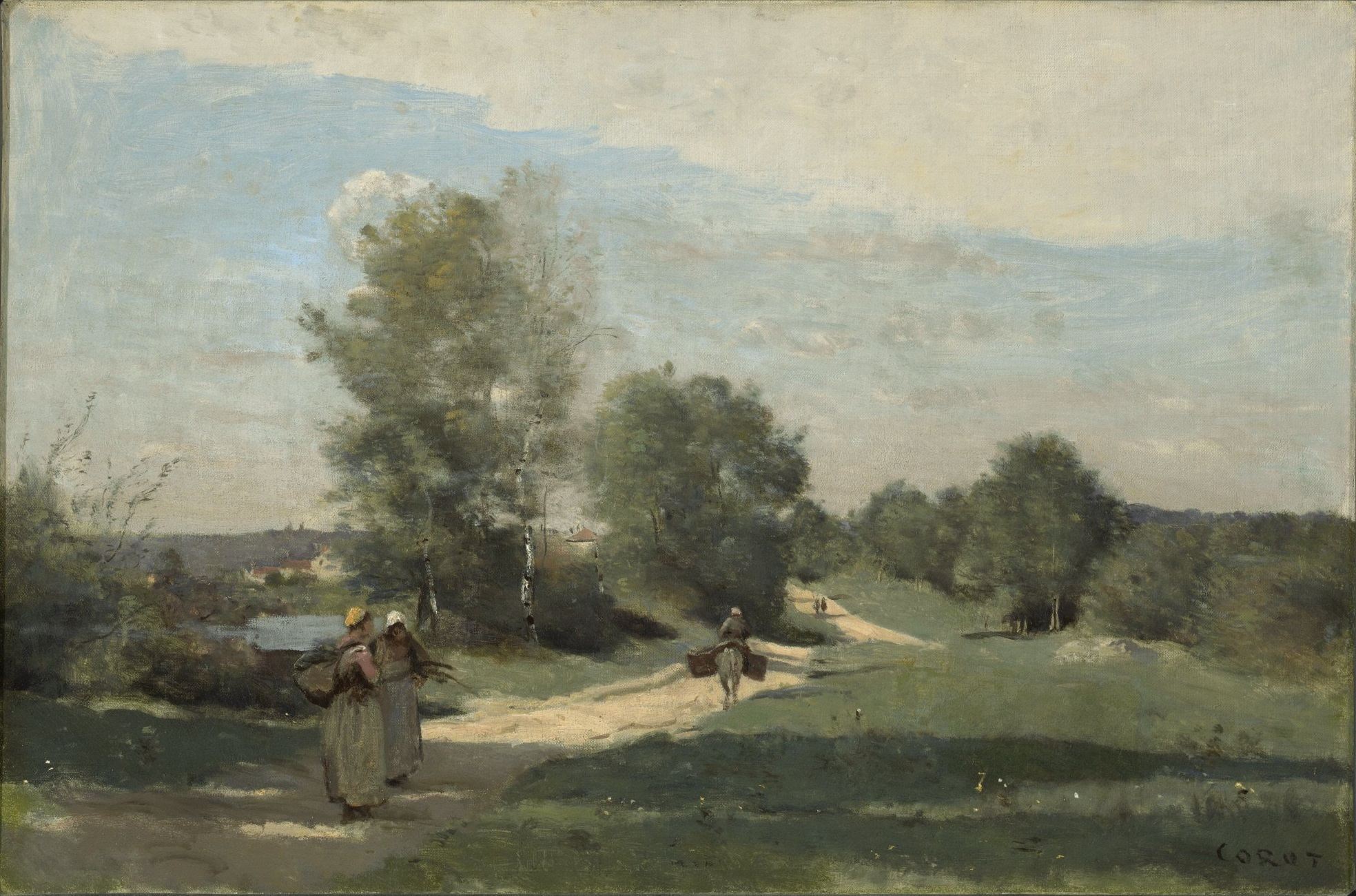
Corot, Road by the Water, c. 1865–70, oil on canvas. Clark Art Institute

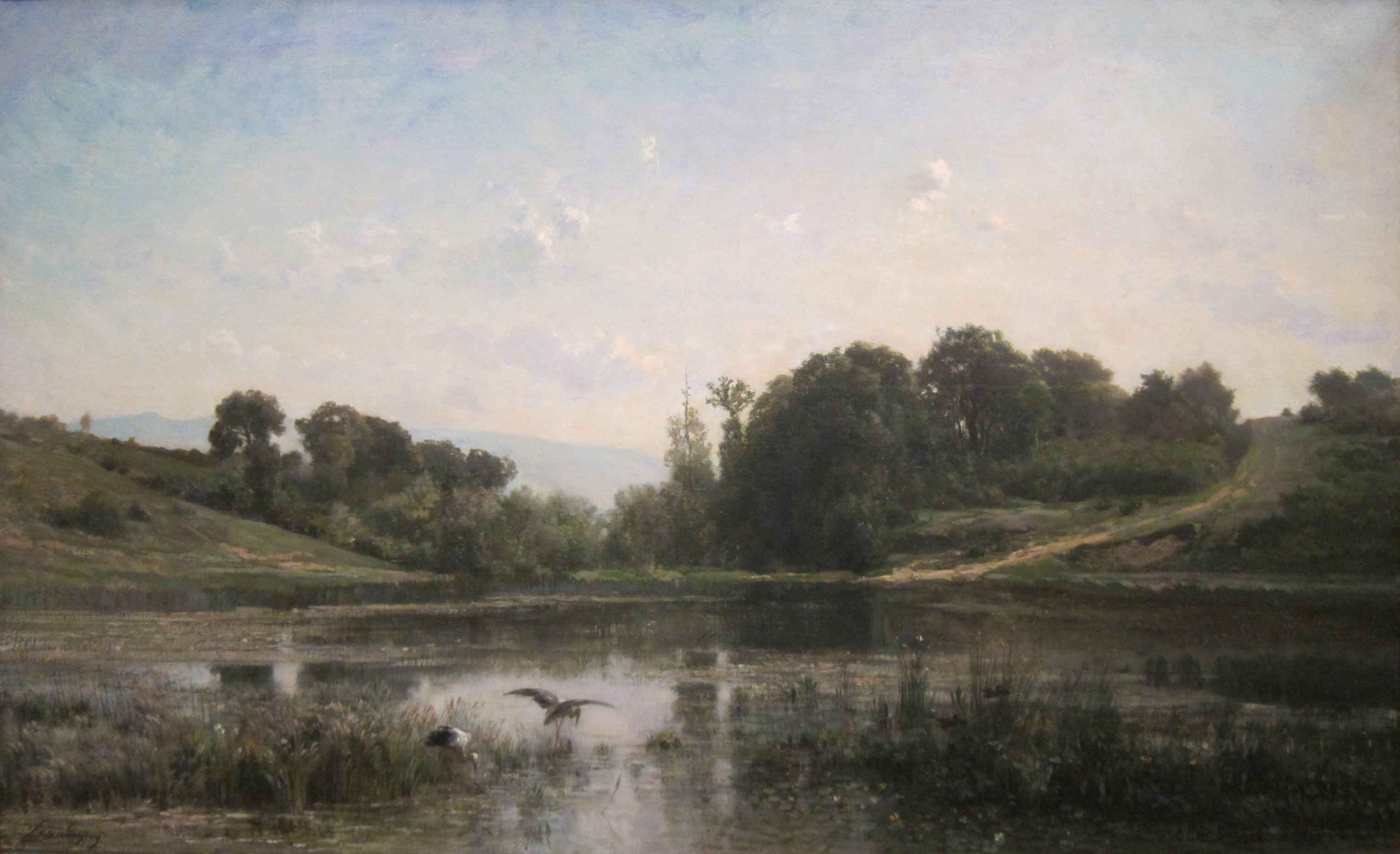
Charles-François Daubigny, The Pond at Gylieu, 1853

The Barbizon School (French: école de Barbizon, pronounced [ekɔl də baʁbizɔ̃]) is the name given to oil painters and others who were part of an art movement advancing Realism in art, which arose in the context of the dominant Romantic Movement of the time. Roughly active from 1830 through 1870, the "school" gained its name from the village of Barbizon, France, on the edge of the Forest of Fontainebleau, where many of the artists gathered. Most of their works were landscape painting, which occasionally included farmworkers, and genre scenes of village life. Some of the most prominent features of this school are its tonal qualities, color, loose brushwork, and softness of form.

The leaders of the Barbizon School were: Théodore Rousseau, Charles-François Daubigny, Jules Dupré, Édouard Manet, Edgar Degas, Constant Troyon, Charles Jacque, and Narcisse Virgilio Díaz. Jean-François Millet lived in Barbizon from 1849, but his interest in figures with a landscape backdrop sets him rather apart from the others. Jean-Baptiste-Camille Corot was the earliest on the scene, first painting in the forest in 1829, but British art historian Harold Osborne suggested that "his work has a poetic and literary quality which sets him somewhat apart". Other artists associated with the school, often pupils of the main group, include: Henri Harpignies, Albert Charpin, François-Louis Français, and Émile van Marcke.

Many of the artists were also printmakers, mostly in etching but the group also provided the bulk of the artists using the semiphotographic cliché verre technique. The French etching revival began with the school, in the 1850s.

== History ==
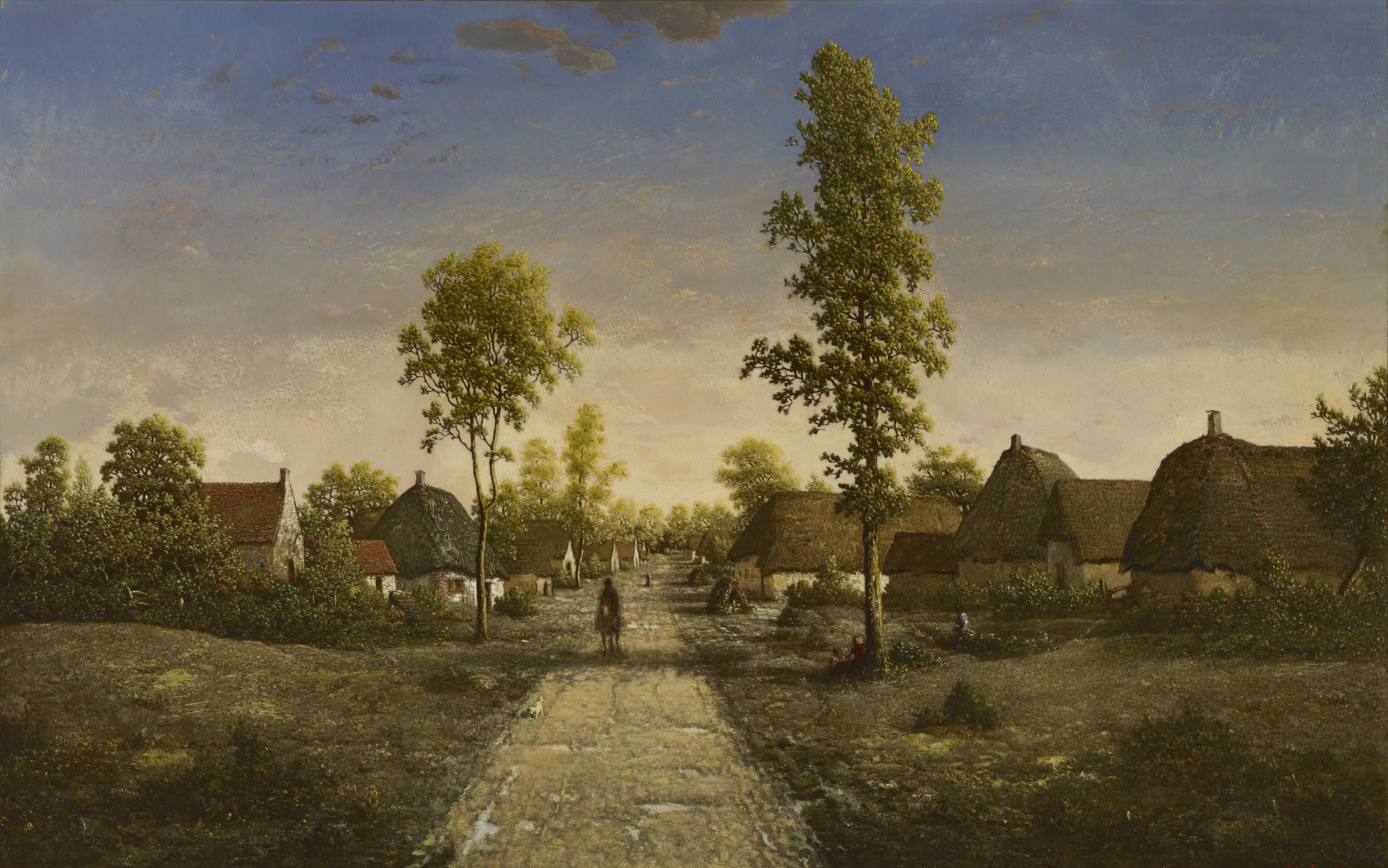
Théodore Rousseau, Becquigny, Somme, c. 1857

The Salon of 1824 in Paris exhibited works of John Constable, an English painter. His rural scenes influenced some of the younger artists of the time, moving them to abandon formalism and to draw inspiration directly from nature. Natural scenes became the subjects of their paintings rather than mere backdrops to dramatic events. During the Revolutions of 1848 artists gathered at Barbizon to follow Constable's ideas, making nature the subject of their paintings. The French landscape became a major theme of the Barbizon painters.

In the spring of 1829, Jean-Baptiste-Camille Corot came to Barbizon to paint in the Forest of Fontainebleau. He had first painted in the forest at Chailly in 1822. He returned to Barbizon in the autumn of 1830 and in the summer of 1831, where he made drawings and oil studies, from which he made a painting intended for the Salon of 1830; "View of the Forest of Fontainebleau'" (now in the National Gallery in Washington) and, for the Salon of 1831, another "View of the Forest of Fontainebleau"'. While there he met the members of the Barbizon School: Théodore Rousseau, Paul Huet, Constant Troyon, Jean-François Millet, and the young Charles-François Daubigny.

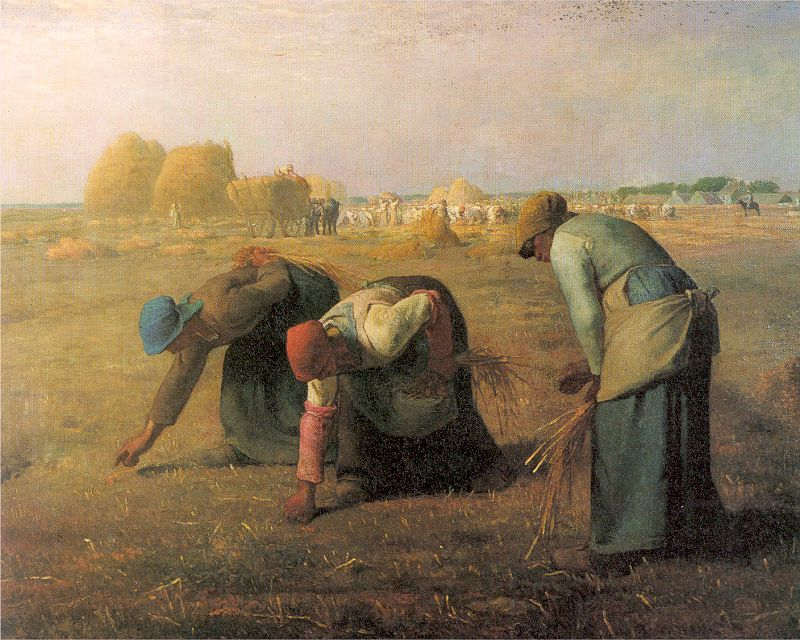
The Gleaners, Jean-François Millet, 1857. Musée d'Orsay, Paris

Millet extended the idea from landscape to figures – peasant figures, scenes of peasant life, and work in the fields. In The Gleaners (1857), for example, Millet portrays three peasant women gleaning a wheat field after its harvest. By placing the paid harvesters and an overseer placed in the back of the painting, Millet shifted the focus and the subject matter from the prosperous to those at the bottom of the social ladder.

During the late 1860s, the Barbizon painters attracted the attention of a younger generation of French artists studying in Paris. Several of those artists visited Fontainebleau Forest to paint the landscape, including future Impressionists Claude Monet, Pierre-Auguste Renoir, Alfred Sisley and Frédéric Bazille. In the 1870s those artists, among others, developed the art movement called Impressionism and practiced plein air painting. In contrast, the main members of the school made drawings and sketches on the spot, but painted back in their studios.

The Post-Impressionist painter Vincent van Gogh studied and copied several of the Barbizon painters as well, including 21 copies of paintings by Millet. He copied Millet more than any other artist. He also did three paintings in Daubigny's Garden.

Both Théodore Rousseau (1867) and Jean-François Millet (1875) died at Barbizon.

== Influence in Europe ==
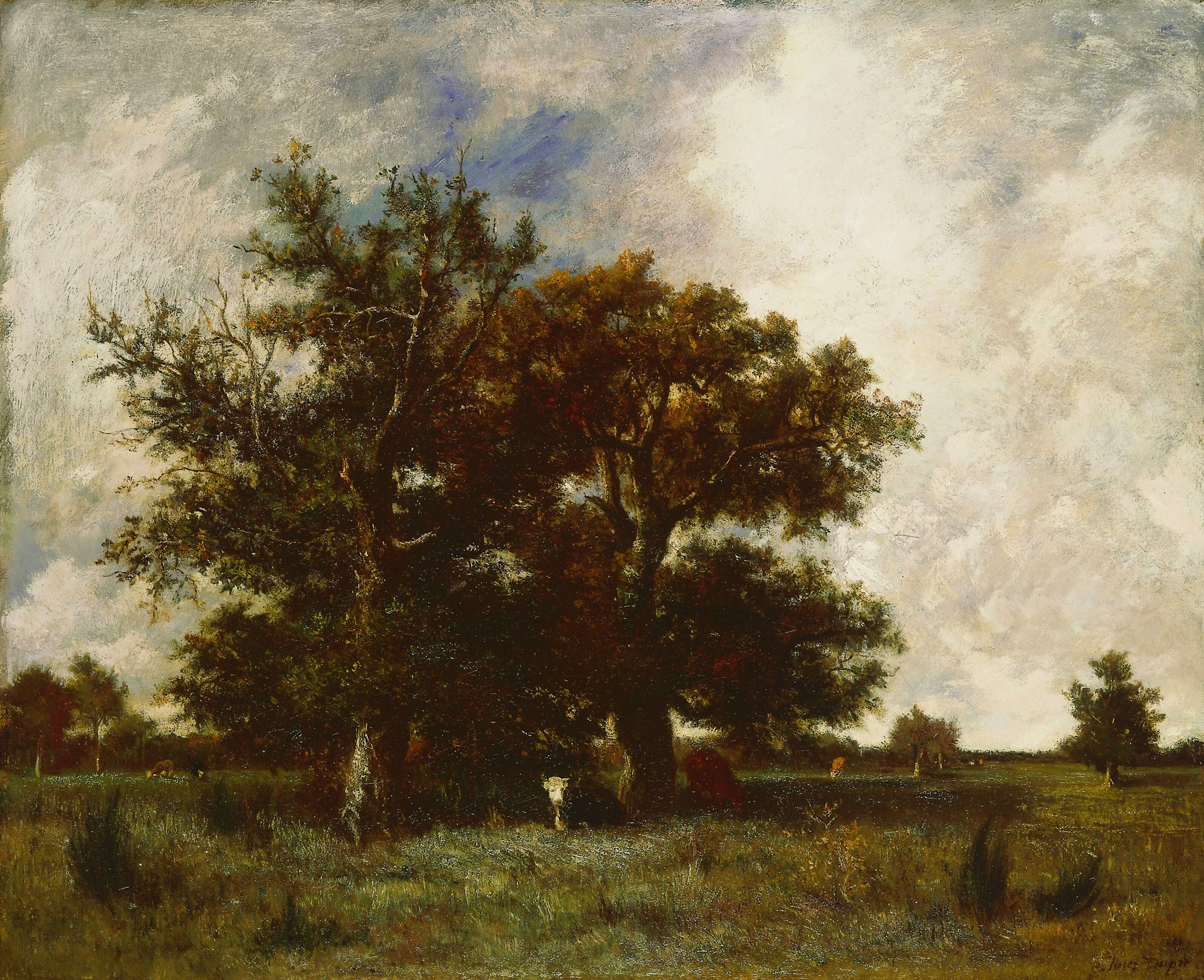
Jules Dupré, Fontainebleau Oaks, c 1840

Painters in other countries were also influenced by this art. Beginning in the late nineteenth century, many artists came to Paris from Austria-Hungary to study the new movements. For instance, the Hungarian painter János Thorma studied in Paris as a young man. In 1896 he was one of the founders of the Nagybánya artists' colony in what is now Baia Mare, Romania, which brought impressionism to Hungary. In 2013 the Hungarian National Gallery opens a major retrospective of his work, entitled, "János Thorma, the Painter of the Hungarian Barbizon", 8 February – 19 May 2013, Hungarian National Gallery

Karl Bodmer, originally Swiss, settled in Barbizon in 1849. László Paál, another Hungarian, lived in Barbizon in the 1870s.

== Influence in America ==
The Barbizon painters also had a profound impact on landscape painting in the United States. This included the development of the American Barbizon school by William Morris Hunt. Several artists who were also in, or contemporary to, the Hudson River School studied Barbizon paintings for their loose brushwork and emotional impact. A notable example is George Inness, who sought to emulate the works of Rousseau. Paintings from the Barbizon School also influenced landscape painting in California. The artist Percy Gray carefully studied works by Rousseau and other painters which he saw in traveling exhibitions to inform his own paintings of California hills and coastline. The influence of the Barbizon painters may be seen in the sporting dog paintings of Percival Rosseau (1859–1937), who grew up in Louisiana and studied at the Academie Julien.

== Gallery ==
Jean-Baptiste-Camille Corot, Forest of Fontainebleau, 1834

Jules Dupré, The Old Oak, c. 1870, National Gallery of Art, Washington, D.C.

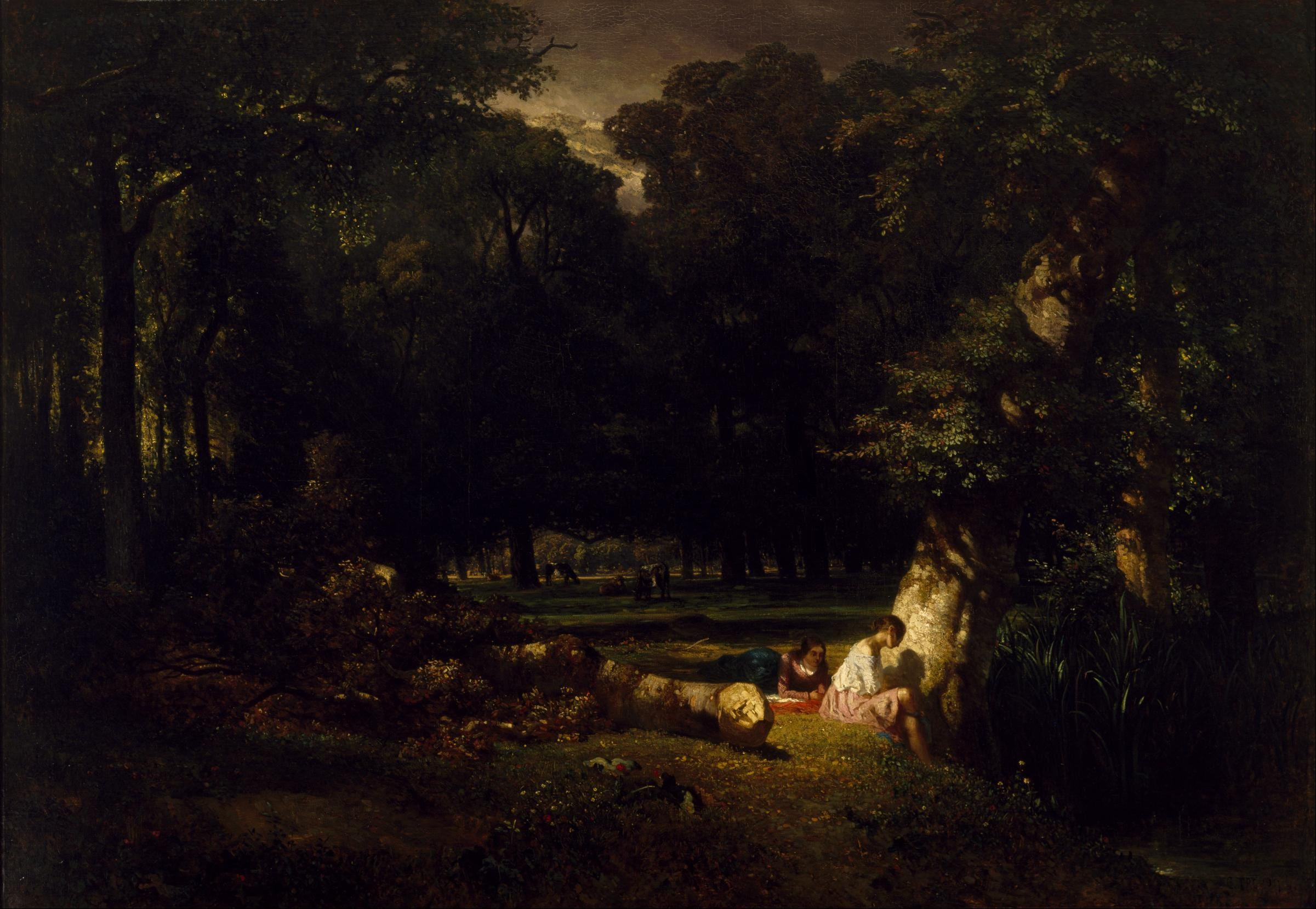
Constant Troyon, The Bathers (Clearing in the Forest), 1842

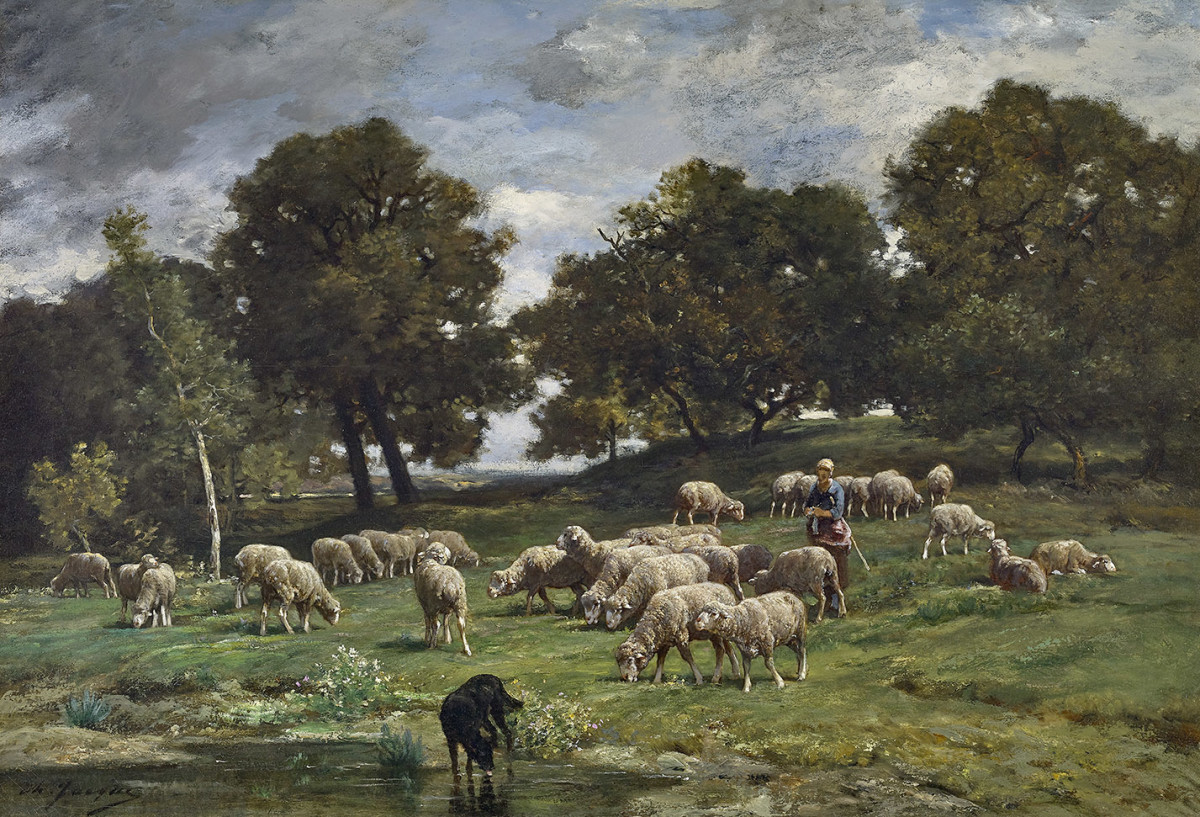
Charles-Émile Jacque, Shepherdess and Her Flock, 1878

== Related artists ==
- Eugène Boudin
- Hippolyte Boulenger
- Jean Ferdinand Chaigneau
- Paul Cornoyer
- Gustave Courbet
- Pierre Emmanuel Damoye
- Constant Dutilleux
- Antonio Fontanesi
- Nicolae Grigorescu
- Winckworth Allan Gay
- H. I. Marlatt
- Adolphe Joseph Thomas Monticelli
- Arthur Parton
- Léon Germain Pelouse
- Paul Trouillebert
- Albert Charpin
- Charles Olivier de Penne

== See also ==
- Art colony
- Macchiaioli

== Sources ==
- Catalogues des Collections des Musees de France. Ministère de la culture. (Catalogs of Collections of Museums of France. Ministry of Culture.)
- Osborne, Harold (ed), The Oxford Companion to Art, 1970, OUP, ISBN 019866107X
