= Jules Dupré =

French painter (1811–1889)

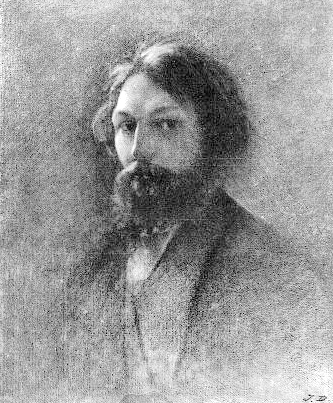
- Self-portrait painted in 1853
- Born: April 5, 1811; Nantes
- Died: October 6, 1889 (aged 78)
- Known for: Landscape paintings
- Notable work: Morning and Evening at the Louvre; Crossing the Bridge in the Wallace Collection
- Movement: Barbizon school

Jules Louis Dupré (French pronunciation: [ʒyl lwi dypʁe]; April 5, 1811 – October 6, 1889) was a French painter, one of the chief members of the Barbizon school of landscape painters.

== Biography ==
Dupré was born in Nantes. He exhibited first at the Salon in 1831, and three years later was awarded a second-class medal. In the same year, he came to England where he was impressed by the genius of Constable. From then on, he learned how to express movement in nature; and the districts around Southampton and Plymouth, with their wide, unbroken expanses of water, sky and ground, gave him good opportunities for studying the tempestuous motion of storm-clouds and the movement of foliage driven by the wind. He was named an Officer of the French Légion d'honneur in 1848.

Dupré's colour is sonorous and resonant. He showed preference for using dramatic sunset effects and stormy skies and seas as the subjects of his paintings. Late in life he changed his style and gained appreciably in largeness of handling and arrived at greater simplicity in his colour harmonies. Among his chief works are the Morning and Evening at the Louvre, and the early Crossing the Bridge in the Wallace Collection.

== Selected paintings ==
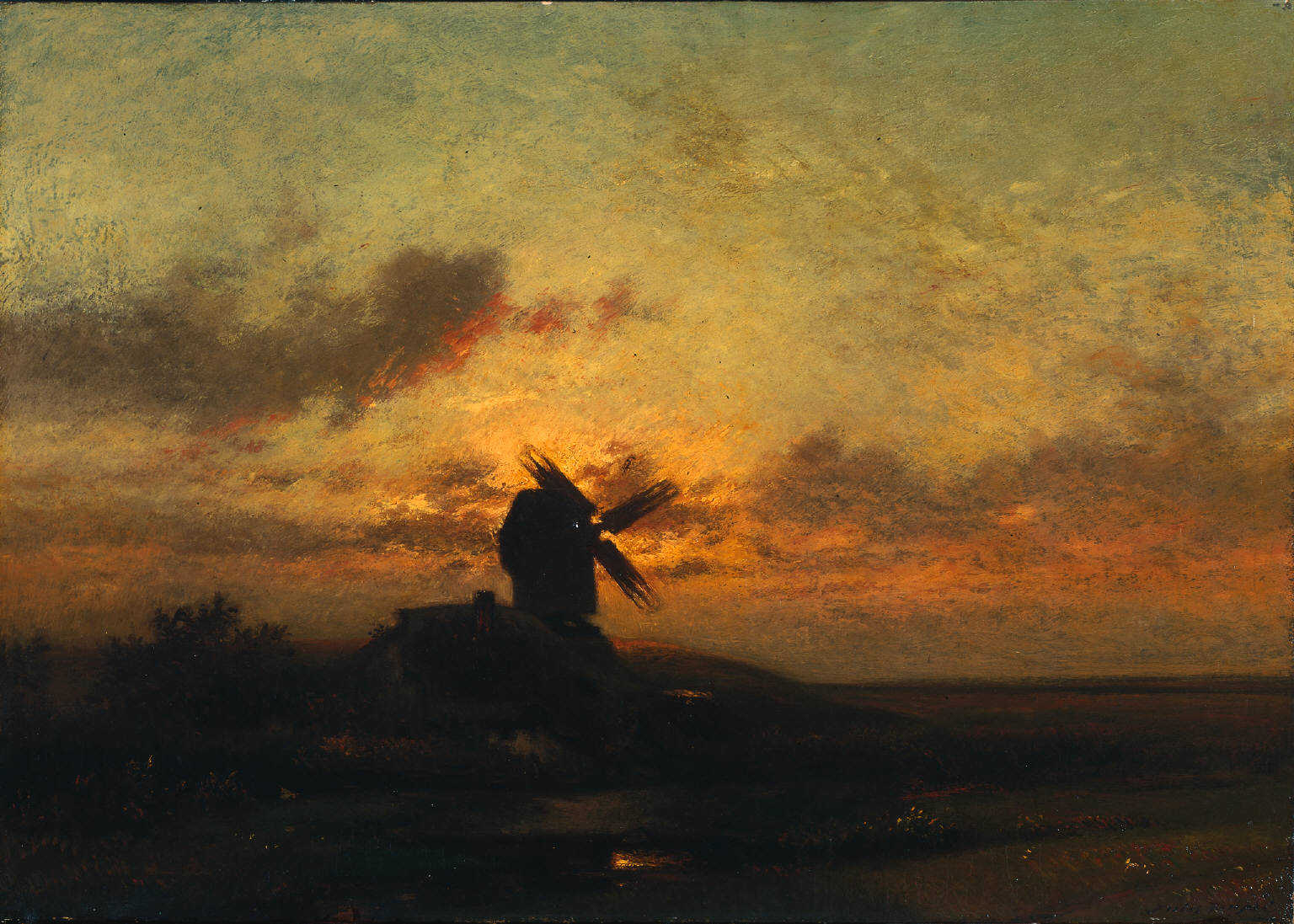
The Windmill (1850s)

The Old Oak (1870) National Gallery of Art.

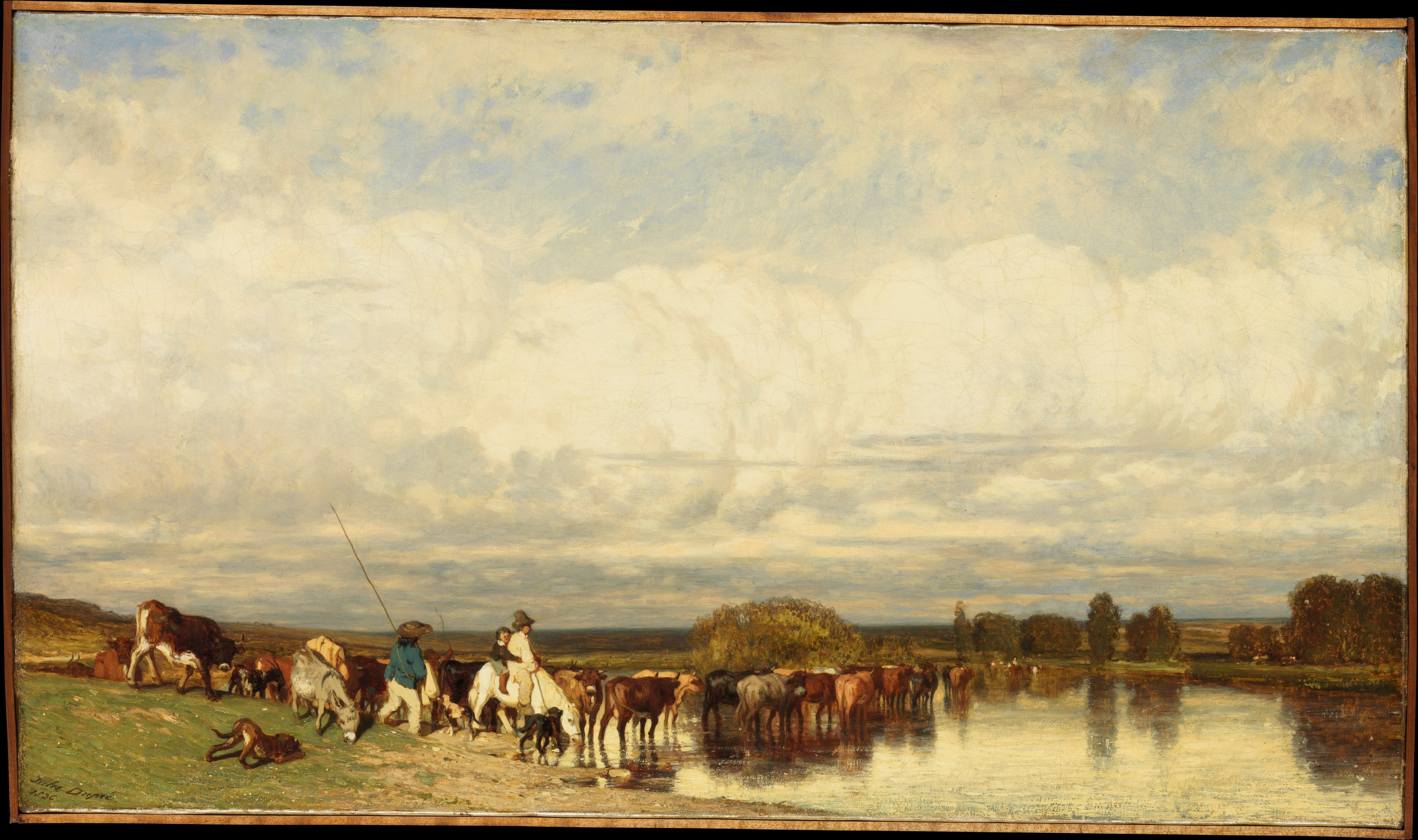
Cows Crossing a Ford, an early work in the collection of the Metropolitan Museum of Art.

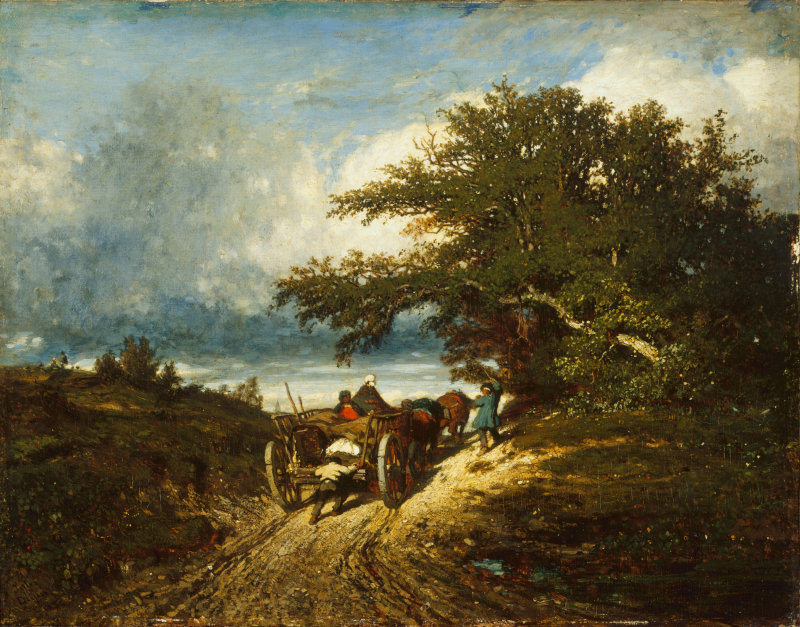
On the Road (1856)
