= Eugène Viollet-le-Duc =

French architect and author (1814–1879)

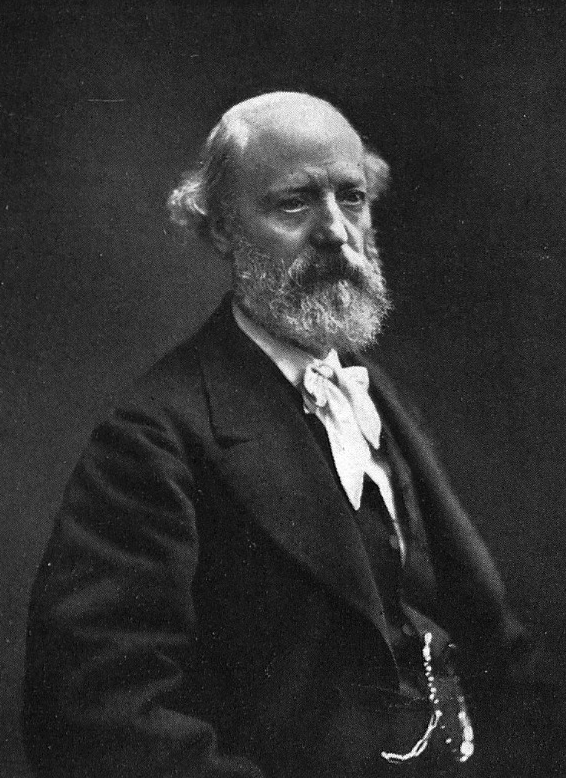
- Photograph by Nadar
- Born: Eugène Emmanuel Viollet-le-Duc; 27 January 1814; Paris, France
- Died: 17 September 1879 (aged 65); Lausanne, Switzerland
- Occupation: Architect
- Awards: Royal Gold Medal (1864)

Signature
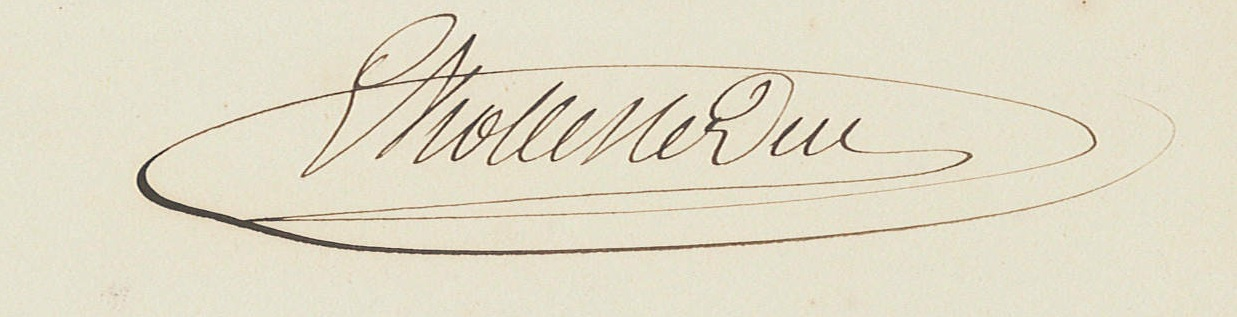

Eugène Emmanuel Viollet-le-Duc (French: [øʒɛn vjɔlɛ lə dyk]; 27 January 1814 – 17 September 1879) was a French architect and writer, famous for his restoration of the most prominent medieval landmarks in France. His major restoration projects included Notre-Dame de Paris, the Basilica of Saint Denis, Mont Saint-Michel, Sainte-Chapelle, the medieval walls of the city of Carcassonne, and Château de Roquetaillade in the Bordeaux region.

His writings on decoration and on the relationship between form and function in architecture had a fundamental influence on a whole new generation of architects, including all the major Art Nouveau artists: Antoni Gaudí, Victor Horta, Hector Guimard, Henry van de Velde, Henri Sauvage and the École de Nancy, Paul Hankar, Otto Wagner, Eugène Grasset, Émile Gallé, and Hendrik Petrus Berlage. He also influenced the first modern architects, Frank Lloyd Wright, Mies van der Rohe, Auguste Perret, Louis Sullivan, and Le Corbusier, who considered Viollet-le-Duc as the father of modern architecture. English architect William Burges claimed that "We all crib from Viollet-le-Duc, although probably not one buyer in ten reads the text".

His writings also influenced John Ruskin, William Morris, and the Arts and Crafts movement. At the International Exhibition of 1862 in London, the aesthetic works of Edward Burne-Jones, Christina Rossetti, Philip Webb, William Morris, Simeon Solomon, and Edward Poynter were directly influenced by drawings in Viollet-le-Duc's Dictionary.

== Youth and education ==
Viollet-le-Duc was born in Paris in 1814. His grandfather was an architect, and his father was a high-ranking civil servant, who in 1816 became the overseer of the royal residences of Louis XVIII. His uncle Étienne-Jean Delécluze was a painter, a former student of Jacques-Louis David, an art critic and hosted a literary salon, which was attended by Stendhal and Sainte-Beuve. His mother hosted her own salon, which women could attend as well as men. There, in 1822 or 1823, Eugène met Prosper Mérimée, a writer who would play a decisive role in his career.

In 1825 he began his education at the Pension Moran, in Fontenay-aux-Roses. He returned to Paris in 1829 as a student at the college de Bourbon (now the Lycée Condorcet). He passed his baccalaureate examination in 1830. His uncle urged him to enter the École des Beaux-Arts, which had been created in 1806, but the École had an extremely rigid system, based entirely on copying classical models, and Eugène was not interested. Instead he decided to get practical experience in the architectural offices of Jacques-Marie Huvé and Achille Leclère, while devoting much of his time to drawing medieval churches and monuments around Paris.

At sixteen he participated in the July 1830 revolution which overthrew Charles X, building a barricade. Following the revolution, which brought Louis Philippe I to power, his father became chief of the bureau of royal residences. The new government created, for the first time, the position of Inspector General of Historic Monuments. Eugène's uncle Delécluze agreed to take Eugène on a long tour of France to see monuments. They travelled from July to October 1831 throughout the south of France, and he returned with a large collection of detailed paintings and watercolours of churches and monuments.

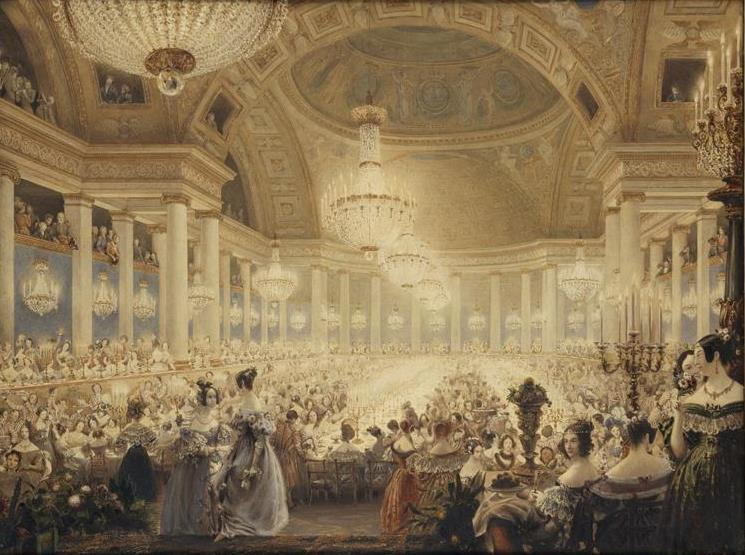
Women's Banquet at the Tuileries painted by Viollet-le-Duc (1835)

On his return to Paris, he moved with his family into the Tuileries Palace, where his father was now governor of royal residences. His family again urged him to attend the École des Beaux-Arts, but he still refused. He wrote in his journal in December 1831, "the École is just a mould for architects. they all come out practically identical." He was a talented and meticulous artist; he travelled around France to visit monuments, cathedrals, and other medieval architecture, made detailed drawings and watercolours. In 1834, at the age of twenty, he married Élisabeth Templier, and in the same year he was named an associate professor of ornamental decoration at the Royal School of Decorative Arts, which gave him a more regular income. His first pupils there included Léon Gaucherel.

With the money from the sale of his drawings and paintings, Viollet-le-Duc set off on a long tour of the monuments of Italy, visiting Rome, Venice, Florence and other sites, drawing and painting. In 1838, he presented several of his drawings at the Paris Salon, and began making a travel book, Picturesque and romantic images of the old France, for which, between 1838 and 1844, he made nearly three hundred engravings.

== First architectural restorations ==
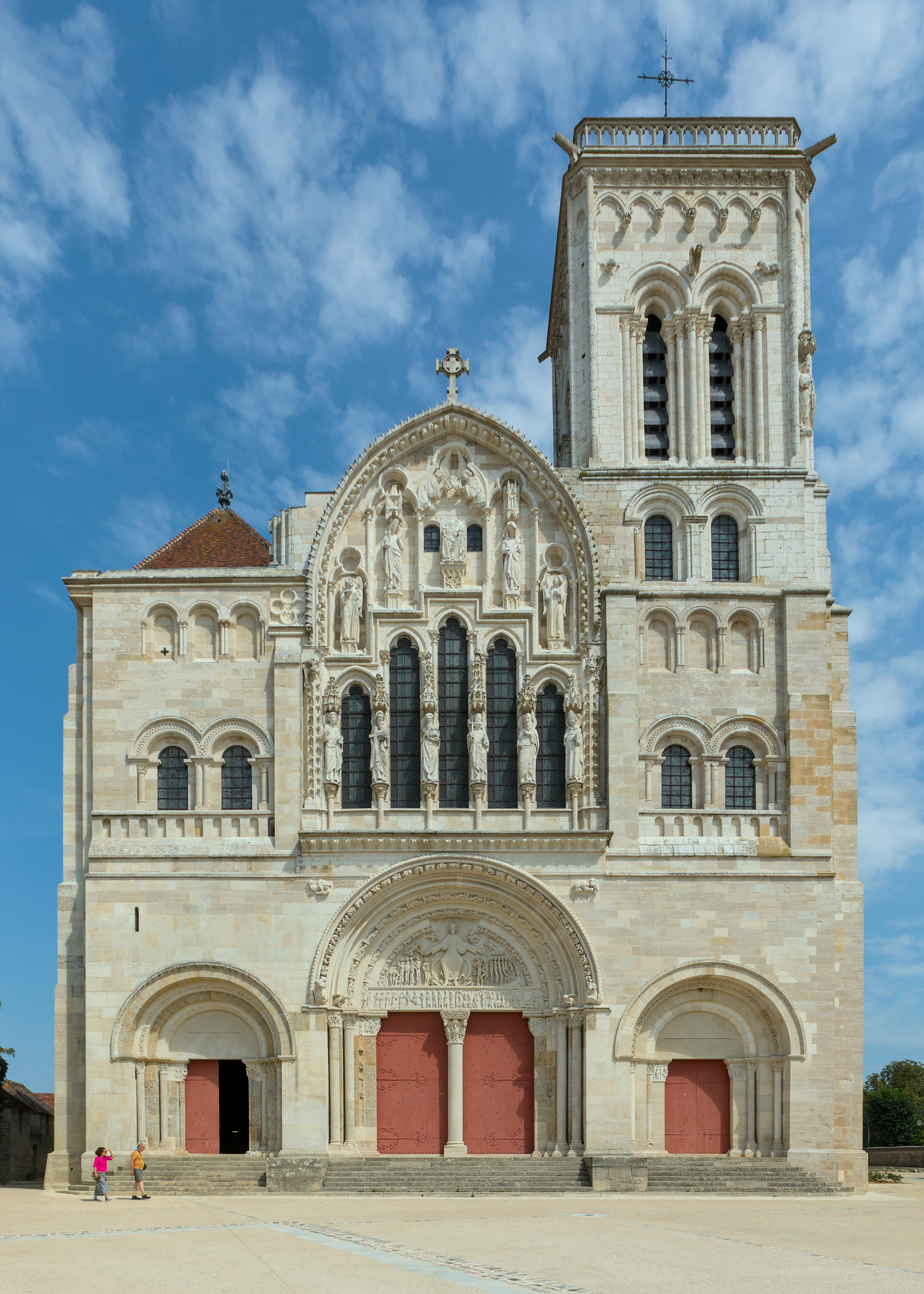
Vézelay Abbey, Viollet-le-Duc's first restoration project

In October 1838, with the recommendation of Achille Leclère, the architect with whom he had trained, he was named deputy inspector of the enlargement of the Hôtel Soubise, the new home of the French National Archives. His uncle, Delécluze, then recommended him to the new Commission of Historic Monuments of France, led by Prosper Mérimée, who had just published a book on medieval French monuments. Though he was just twenty-four years old and had no degree in architecture, he was asked to go to Narbonne to propose a plan for the completion of the cathedral there. The project was rejected by the local authorities as too ambitious and too expensive.

His first real project was a restoration of the Vézelay Abbey, which many considered as impossible. The church had been sacked by the Huguenots in 1569, and during the French Revolution the facade and statuary on the facade were destroyed. The vaults of the roof were weakened, and many of the stones had been carried off for other projects. When Mérimée visited to inspect the structure he heard stones falling around him. In February 1840 he gave Viollet-le-Duc the mission of restoring and reconstructing the church so it would not collapse, while "respecting exactly in his project of restoration all the ancient dispositions of the church".

The task was all the more difficult because up until that time no scientific studies had been made of medieval building techniques, and there were no schools of restoration. He had no plans for the original building to work from. Viollet-le-Duc had to discover the flaws of construction that had caused the building to start to collapse in the first place and to construct a more solid and stable structure. He lightened the roof and built new arches to stabilize the structure, and slightly changed the shape of the vaults and arches. He was criticized for these modifications in the 1960s, though, as his defenders pointed out, without them the roof would have collapsed under its own weight. Mérimée's deputy, Lenormant, inspected the construction and reported to Mérimée: "The young Leduc seems entirely worthy of your confidence. He needed a magnificent audacity to take charge of such a desperate enterprise; it's certain that he arrived just in time, and if we had waited only ten years the church would have been a pile of stones." This restoration work lasted 19 years.

== Sainte-Chapelle and Amboise ==
Viollet-le-Duc's success at Vezelay led to a large series of projects. In 1840, in collaboration with his friend the architect Jean-Baptiste Lassus he began the restoration of Sainte-Chapelle in Paris, which had been turned into a storage depot after the Revolution. In February 1843, King Louis Philippe sent him to the Château of Amboise, to restore the stained glass windows in the chapel holding the tomb of Leonardo da Vinci. The windows were unfortunately destroyed in 1940 during World War II.

In 1843, Mérimée took Viollet-le-Duc with him to Burgundy and the south of France, on one of his long inspection tours of monuments. Viollet-le-Duc made drawings of the buildings and wrote detailed accounts of each site, illustrated with his drawing, which were published in architectural journals. With his experience he became the most prominent academic scholar on French medieval architecture and his medieval dictionary, with over 4000 drawings, contains the largest iconography on the subject to this day.

== Notre-Dame de Paris ==
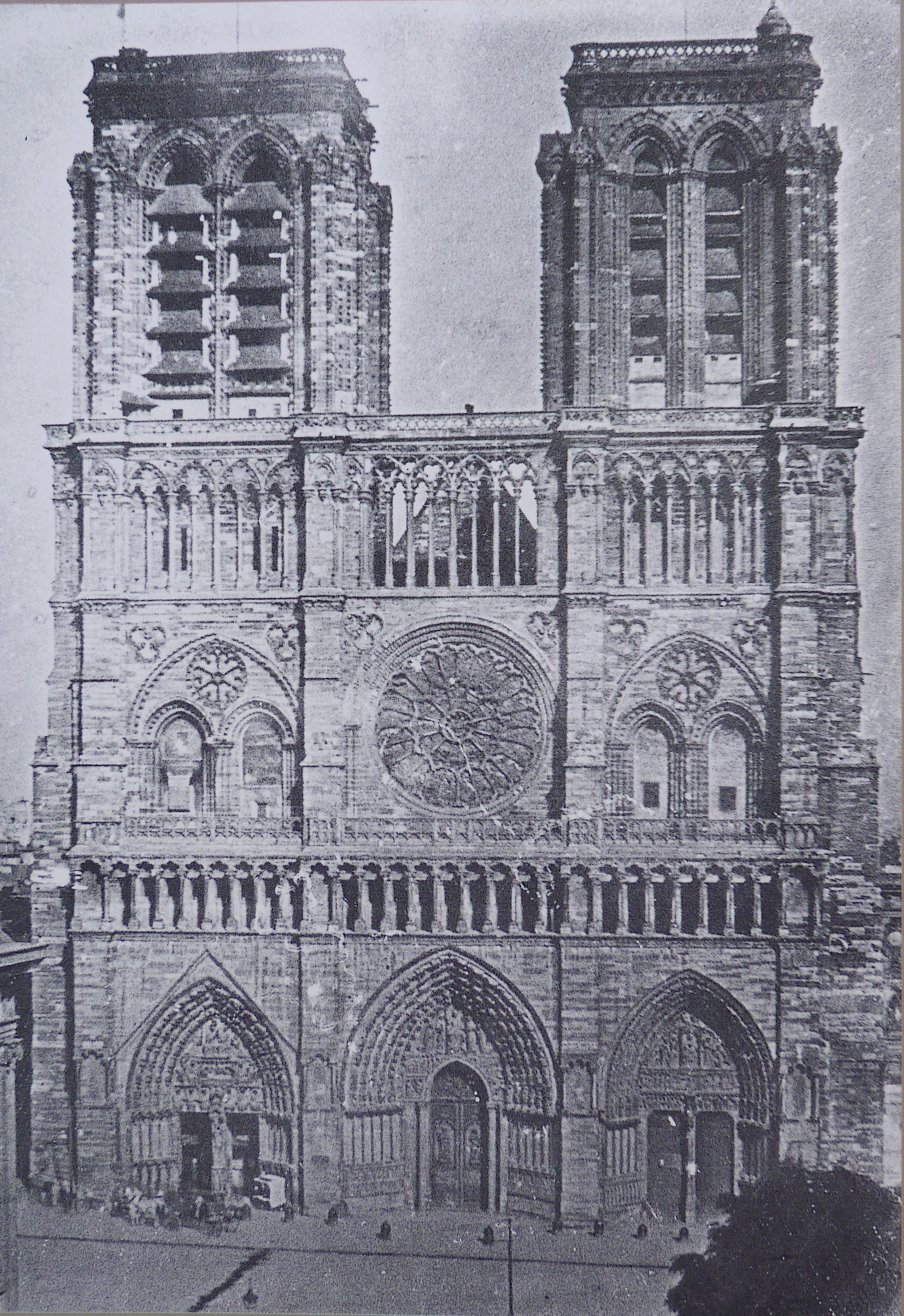
Facade about 1841, pre-restoration

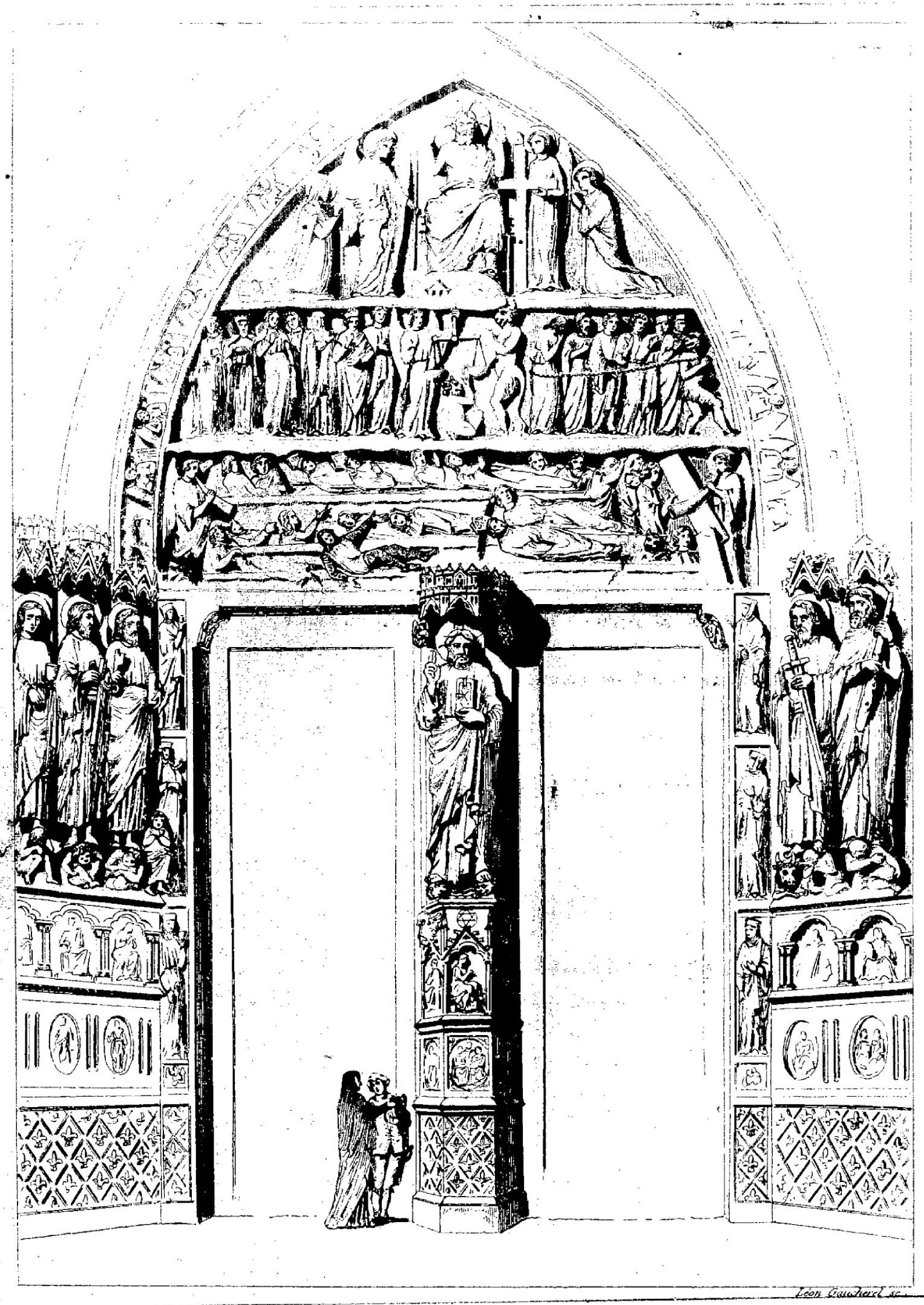
Proposed doorway decoration

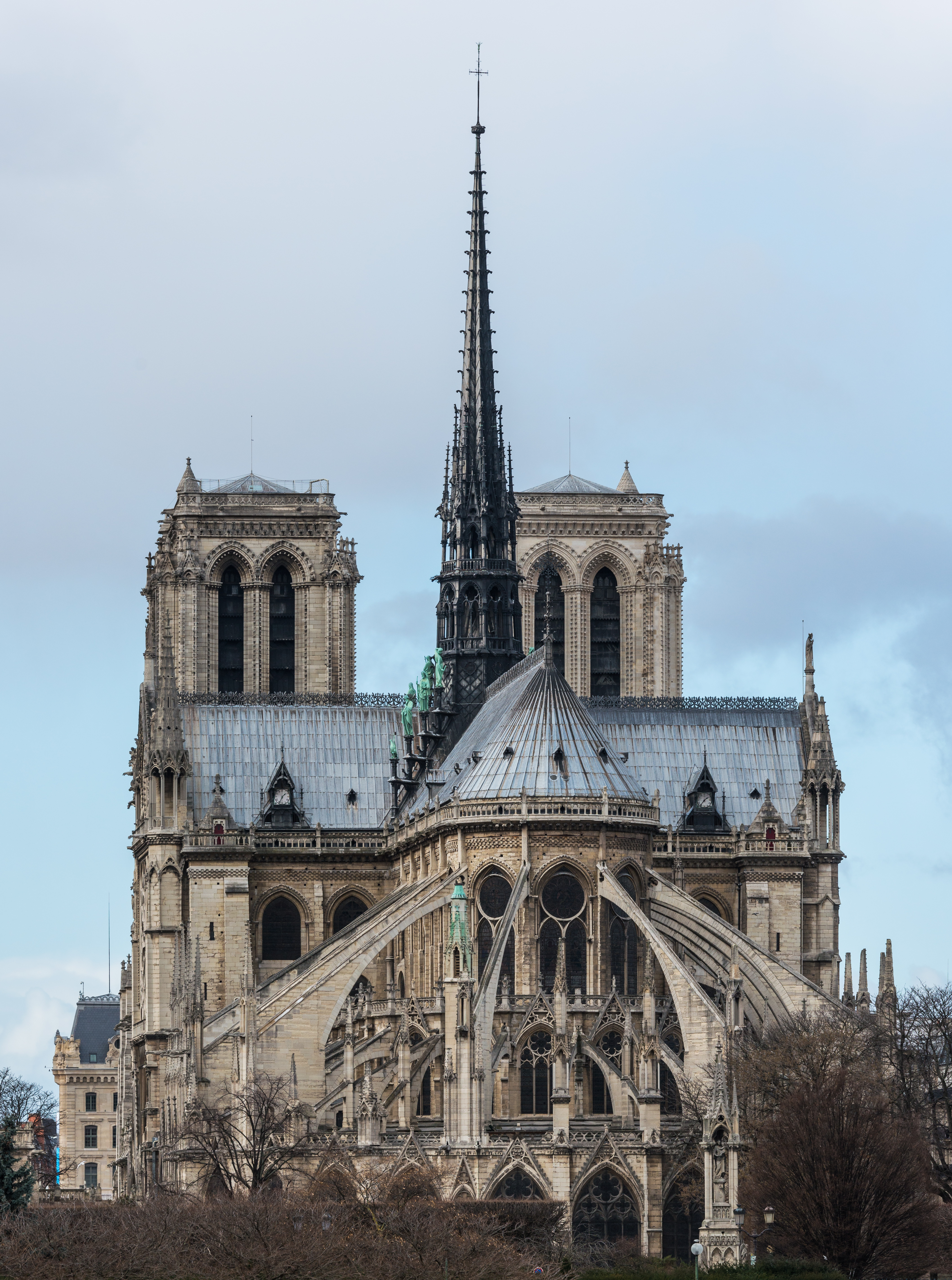
View of the spire of Notre-Dame restored by Viollet-le-Duc

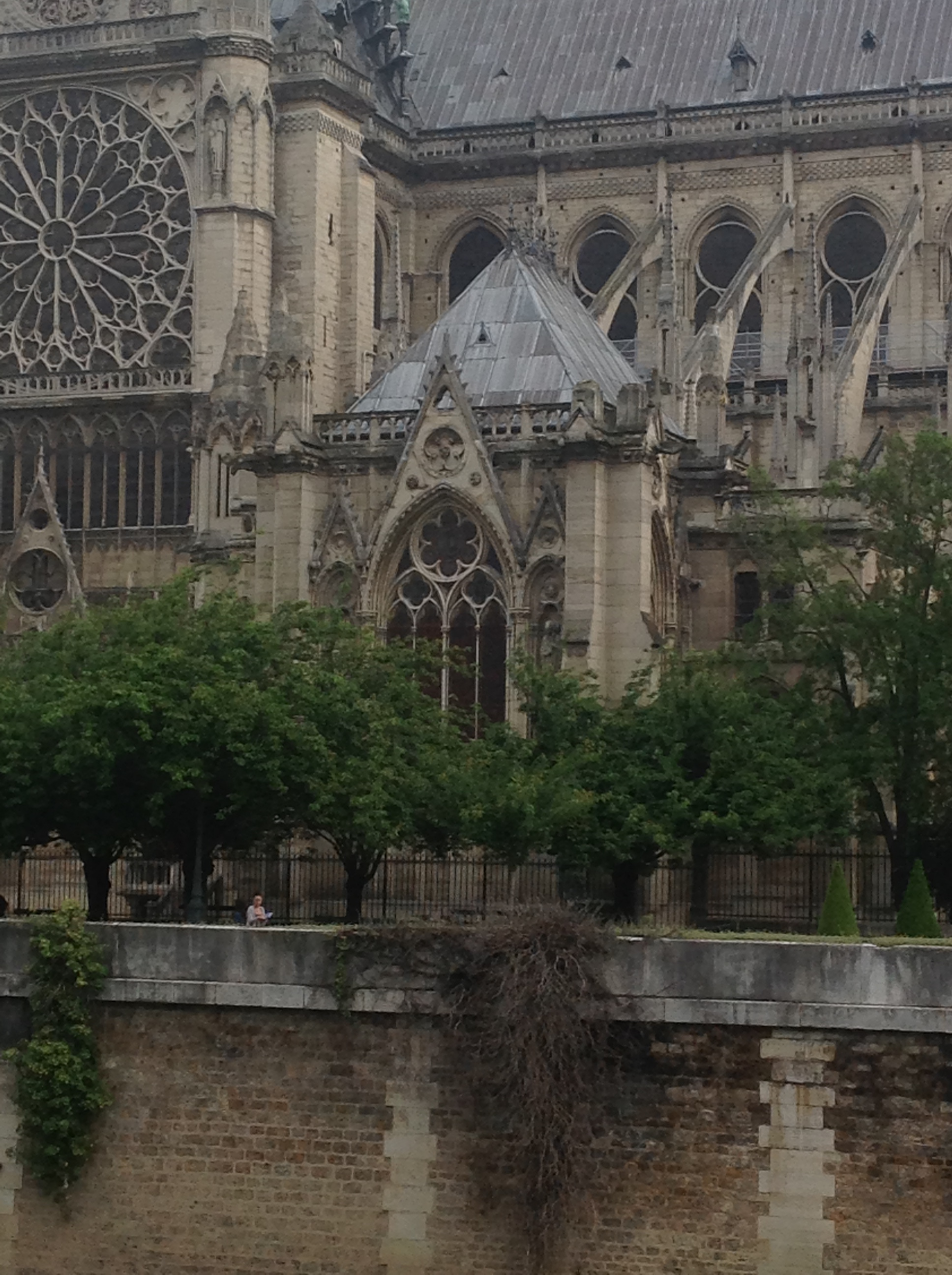
The treasury of the cathedral, designed by Viollet-le-Duc to replace destroyed Archbishop's residence (1849)

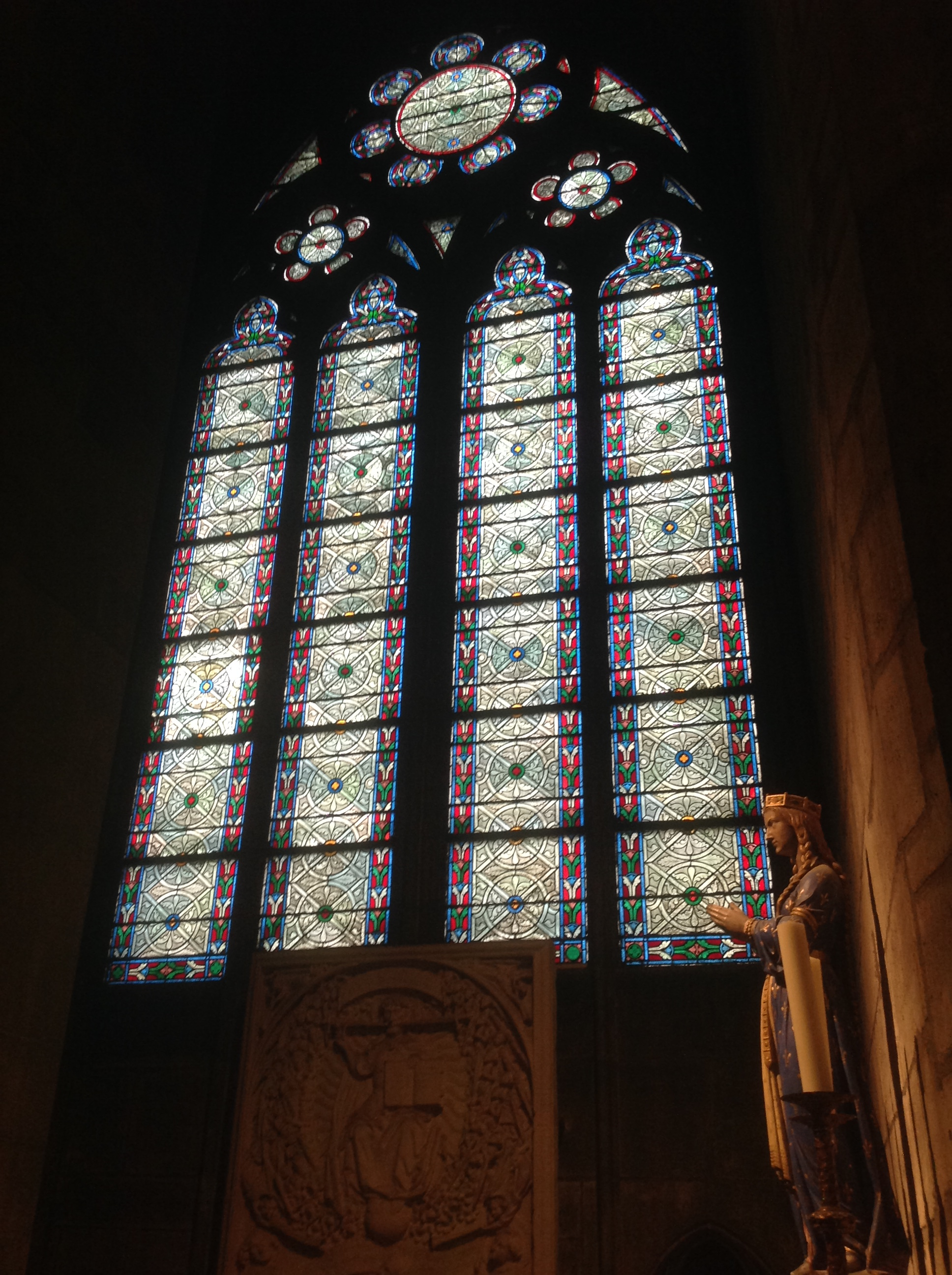
Window of the Chapel of Saint-Clotilde designed by Viollet-le-Duc (1864)

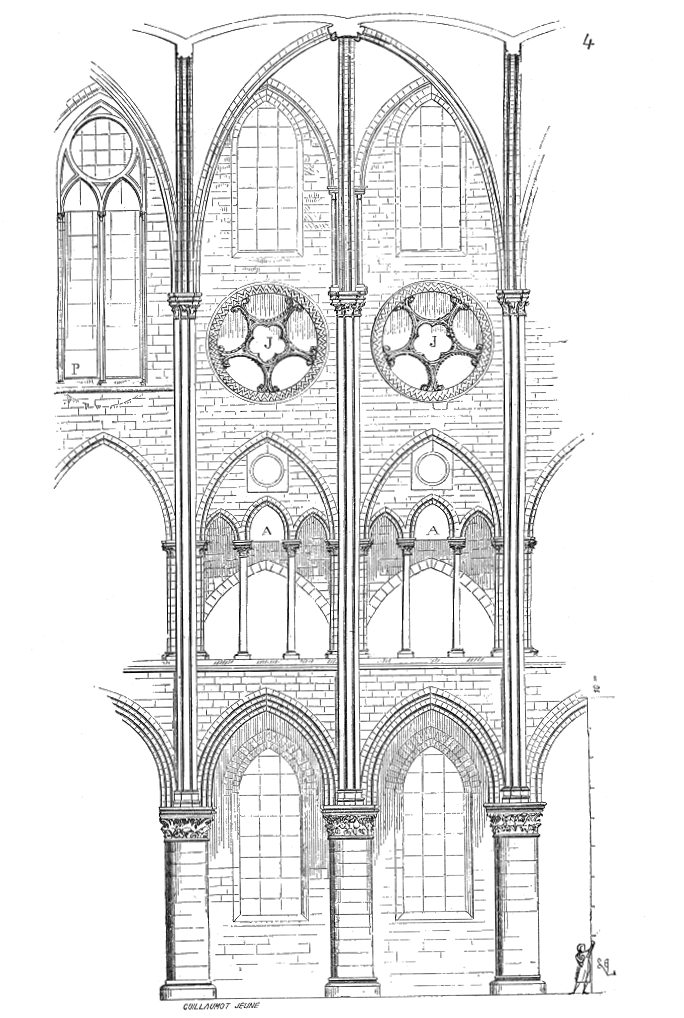
Drawing of the interior traverse

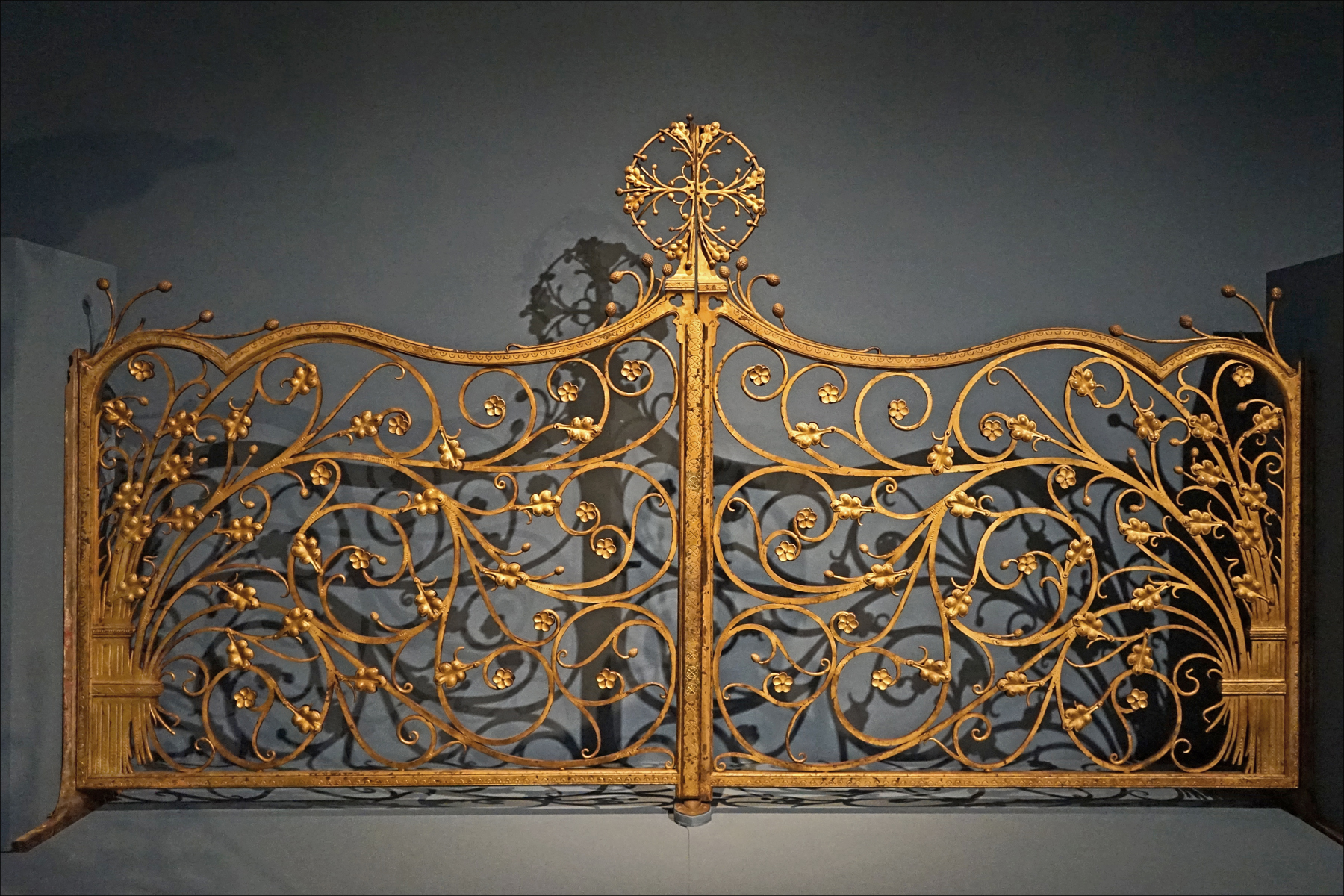
Choir gate designed by Viollet-le-Duc

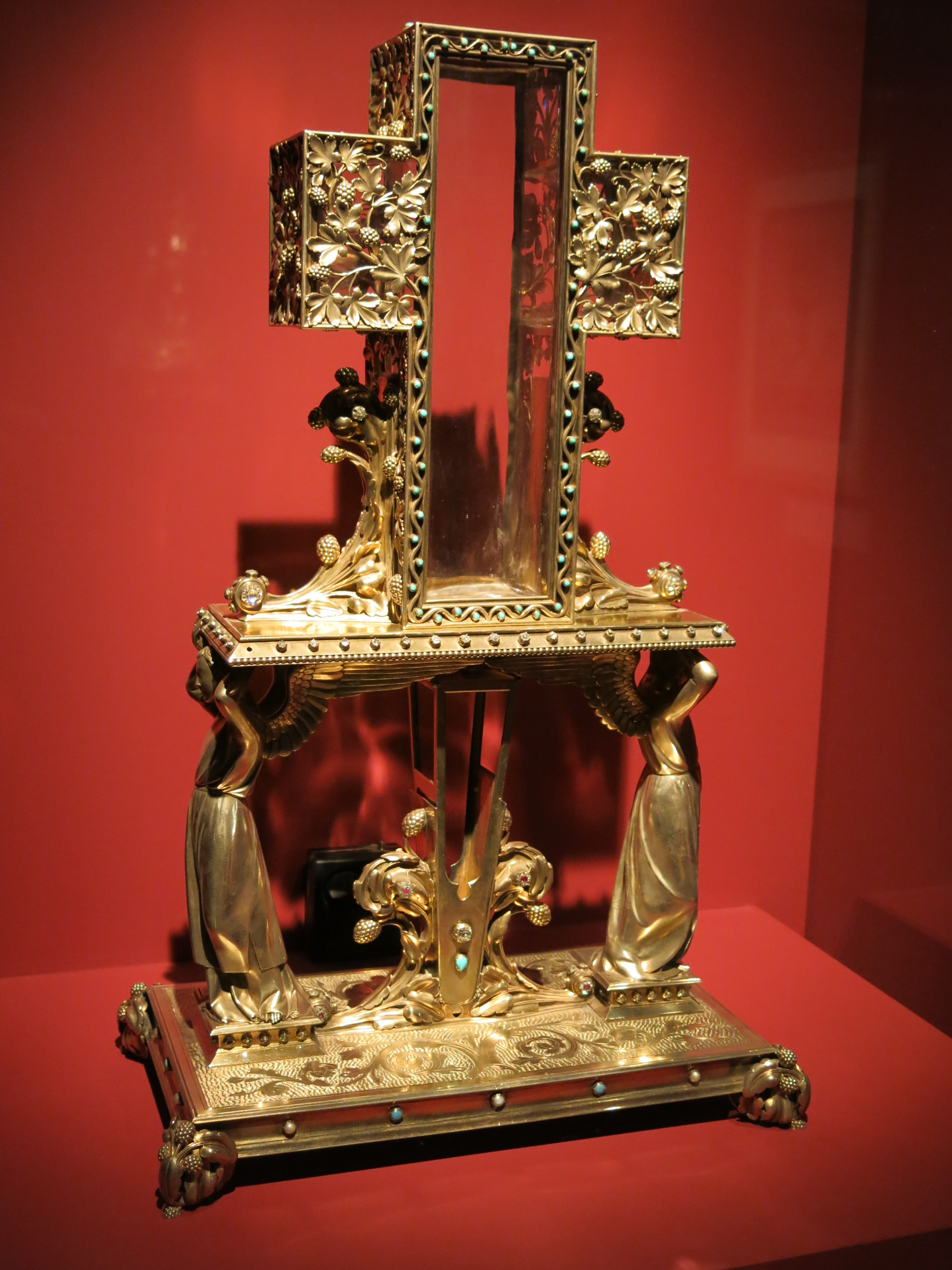
Reliquary designed by Viollet-le-Duc

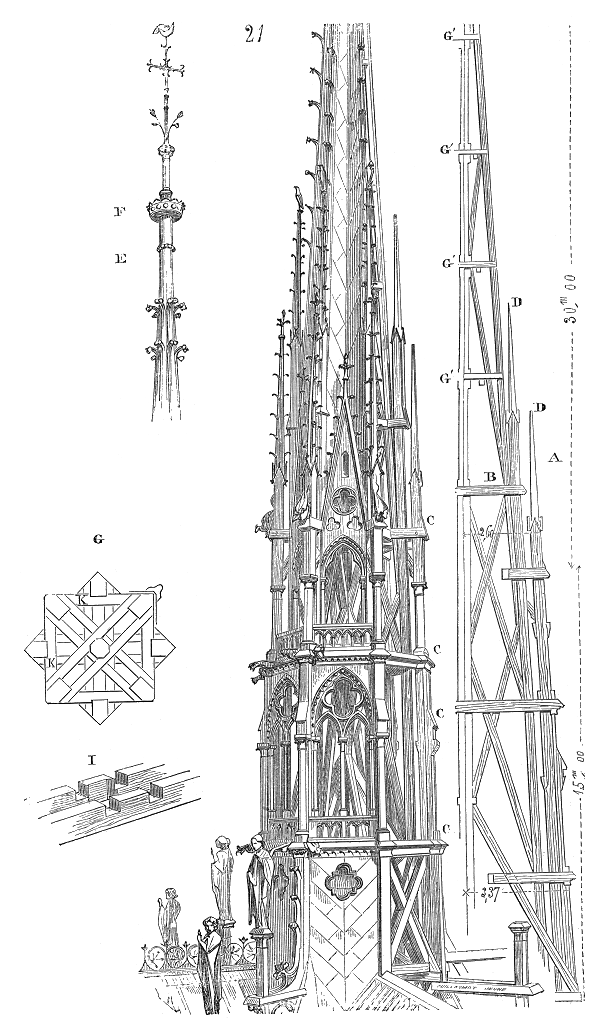
Drawing of the spire

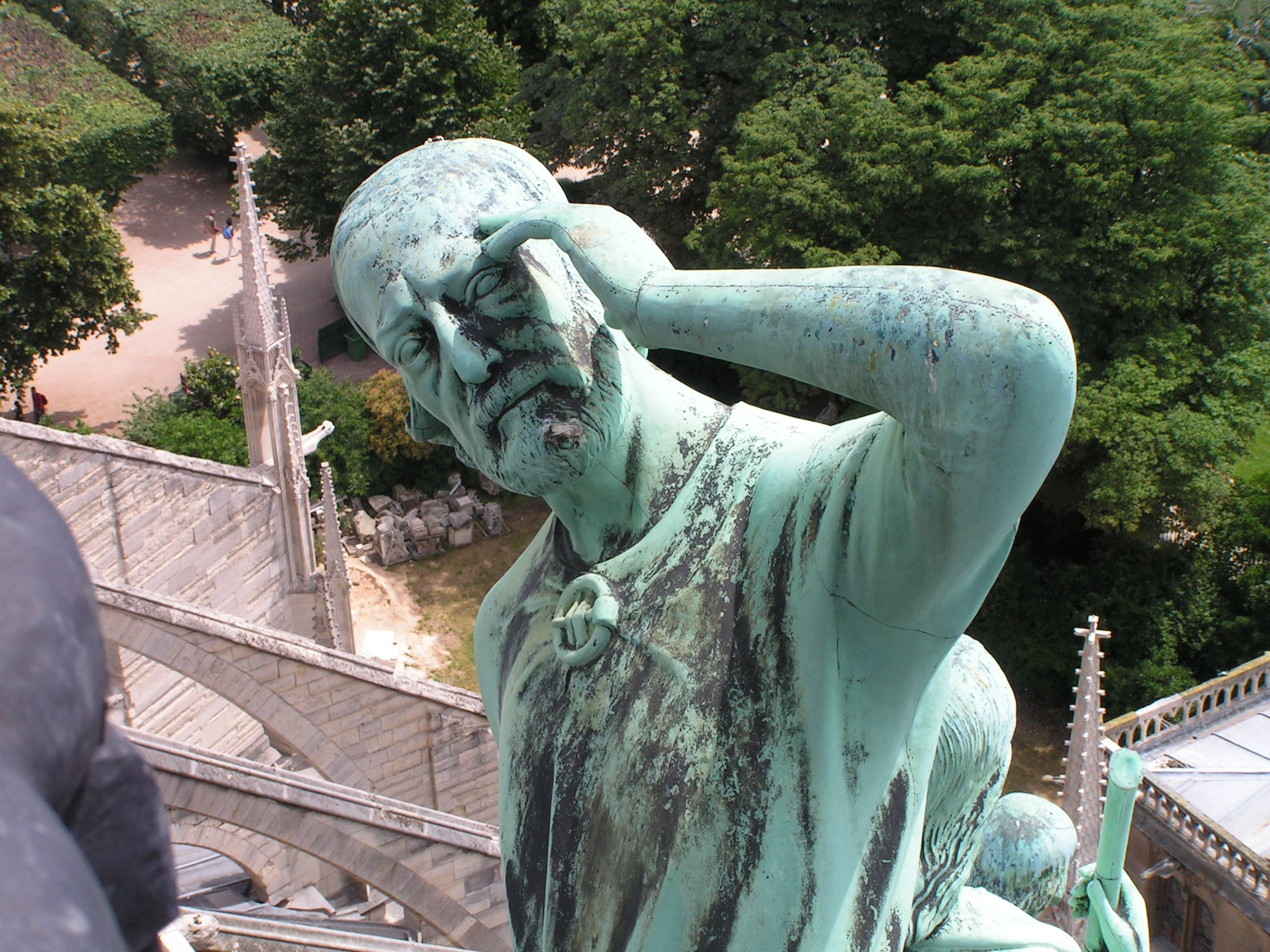
Saint Thomas on the spire, resembling Viollet-le-Duc

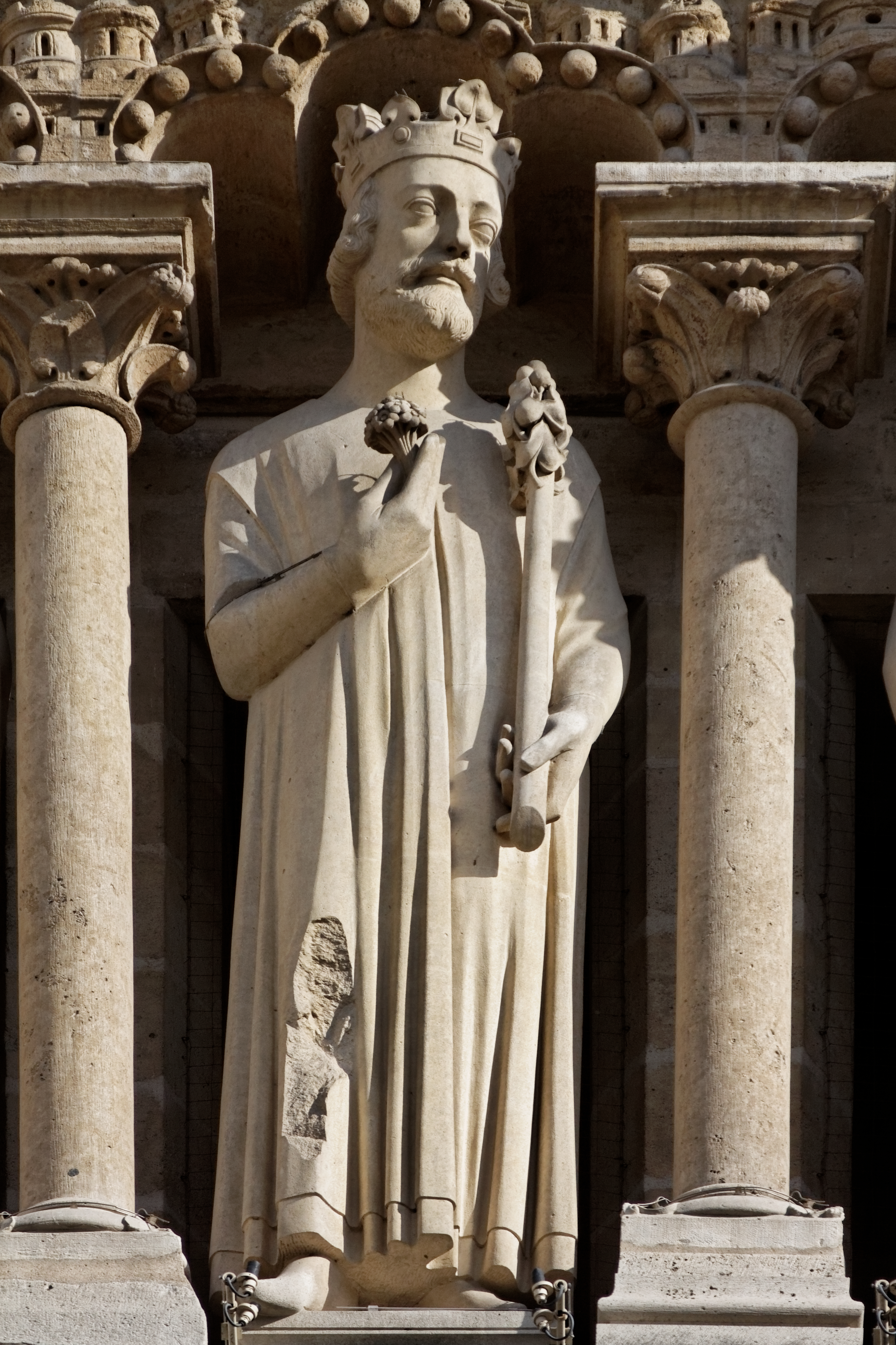
Statue in the Kings' Gallery resembling Viollet-le-Duc

In 1844, with the backing of Mérimée, Viollet-le-Duc, just thirty years old, and Lassus, then thirty-seven, won a competition for the restoration of Notre-Dame Cathedral which lasted twenty-five years. Their project involved primarily the facade, where many of the statues over the portals had been beheaded or smashed during the Revolution. They proposed two major changes to the interior: rebuilding two of the bays to their original medieval height of four storeys, and removing the marble neoclassical structures and decoration which had been added to the choir during the reign of Louis XIV. Mérimée warned them to be careful: "In such a project, one cannot act with too much prudence or discretion...A restoration may be more disastrous for a monument than the ravages of centuries." The Commission on Historical Monuments approved most of Viollet-le-Duc's plans, but rejected his proposal to remove the choir built under Louis XIV. Viollet-le-Duc himself turned down a proposal to add two new spires atop the towers, arguing that such a monument "would be remarkable but would not be Notre-Dame de Paris". Instead, he proposed to rebuild the original medieval spire and bell tower over the transept, which had been removed in 1786 because it was unstable in the wind.

Once the project was approved, Viollet-le-Duc made drawings and photographs of the existing decorative elements; then they were removed and a stream of sculptors began making new statues of saints, gargoyles, chimeras and other architectural elements in a workshop he established, working from his drawings and photographs of similar works in other cathedrals of the same period. He also designed a new treasury in the Gothic style to serve as the museum of the cathedral, replacing the residence of the Archbishop, which had been destroyed in a riot in 1831.

The bells in the two towers had been taken out in 1791 and melted down to make cannons. Viollet-le-Duc had new bells cast for the north tower and a new structure built inside to support them. Viollet-le-Duc and Lassus also rebuilt the sacristy, on the south side of the church, which had been built in 1756, but had been burned by rioters during the July Revolution of 1830. The new spire was completed, taller and more strongly built to withstand the weather; it was decorated with statues of the apostles, and the face of Saint Thomas, patron saint of architects, bore a noticeable resemblance to Viollet-le-Duc. The spire was destroyed on 15 April 2019, as a result of the Notre-Dame de Paris fire.

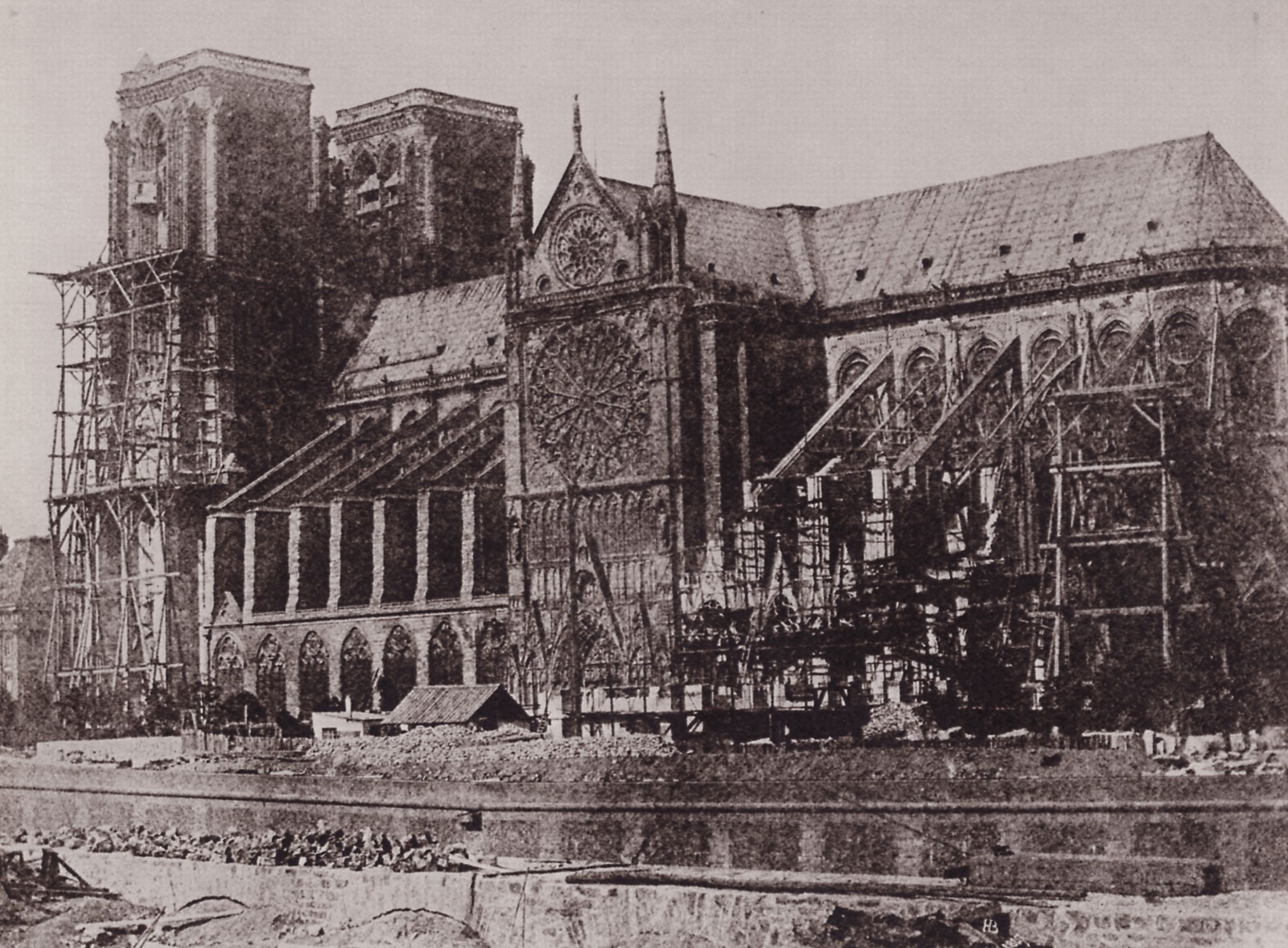
The southern façade of Notre-Dame pictured in 1847, early in the restoration.

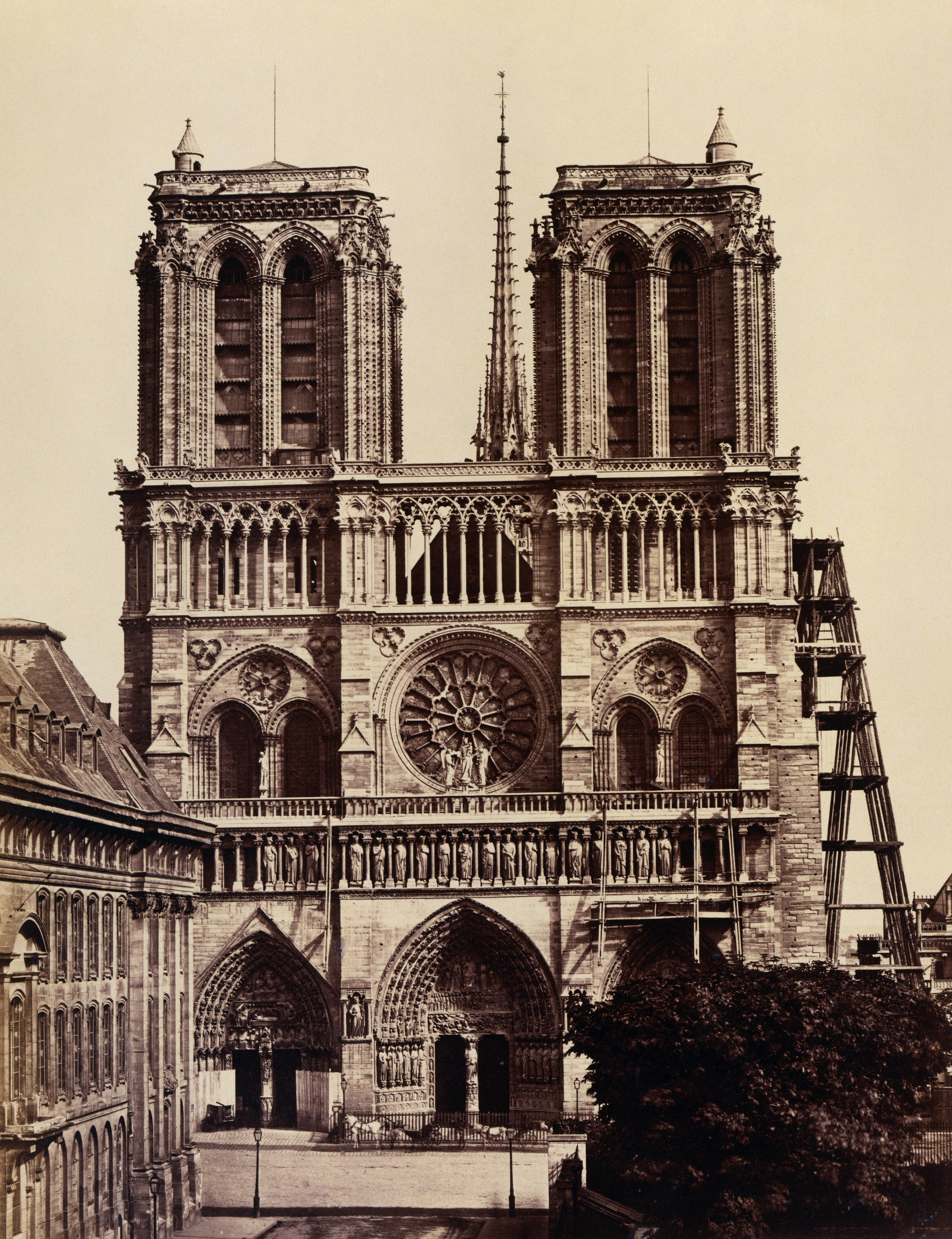
The western façade of Notre-Dame pictured in the early 1860s towards the end of the restoration. The spire has been rebuilt and the statues of the kings are only partially restored.

== Saint-Denis and Amiens ==
When not engaged in Paris, Viollet-le-Duc continued his long tours into the French provinces, inspecting and checking the progress of more than twenty different restoration projects that were under his control, including seven in Burgundy alone. New projects included the Basilica of Saint-Sernin, Toulouse, and the Basilica of Saint-Denis just outside Paris. Saint-Denis had undergone a restoration by a different architect, Francois Debret, who had rebuilt one of the two towers. However, in 1846, the new tower, overloaded with masonry, began to crack, and Viollet-le-Duc was called in. He found no way the building could be saved and had to oversee the demolition of the tower, saving the stones. He concentrated on restoring the interior of the church, and was able to restore the original burial chamber of the kings of France.

In May 1849, he was named the architect for the restoration of Amiens Cathedral, one of the largest in France, which had been built over many centuries in a variety of different styles. He wrote, "his goal should be to save in each part of the monument its own character, and yet to make it so that the united parts don't conflict with each other; and that can be maintained in a state that is durable and simple."

== Imperial projects: Carcassonne, Vincennes and Pierrefonds ==
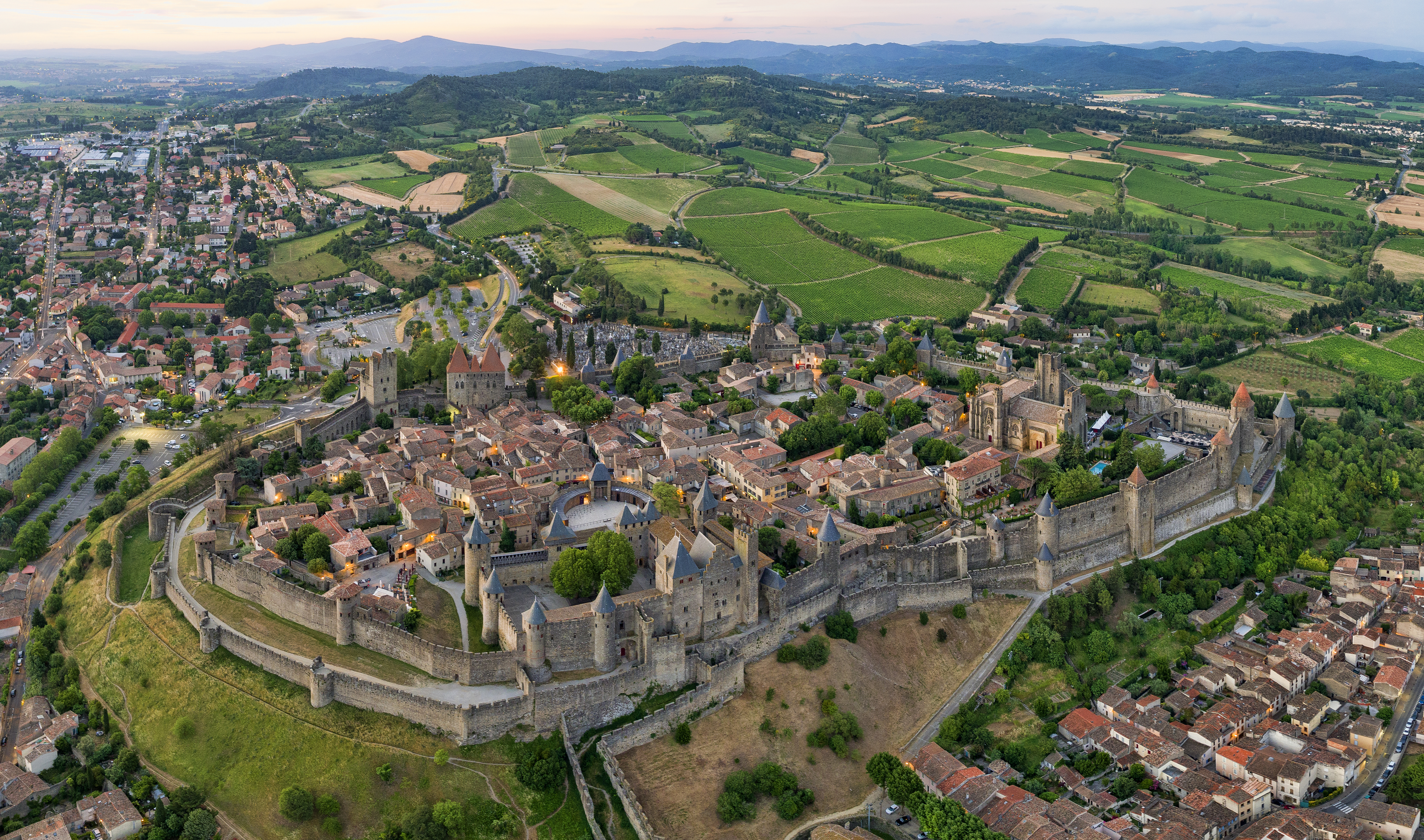
The walled town of Carcassonne (restored 1853–1879)

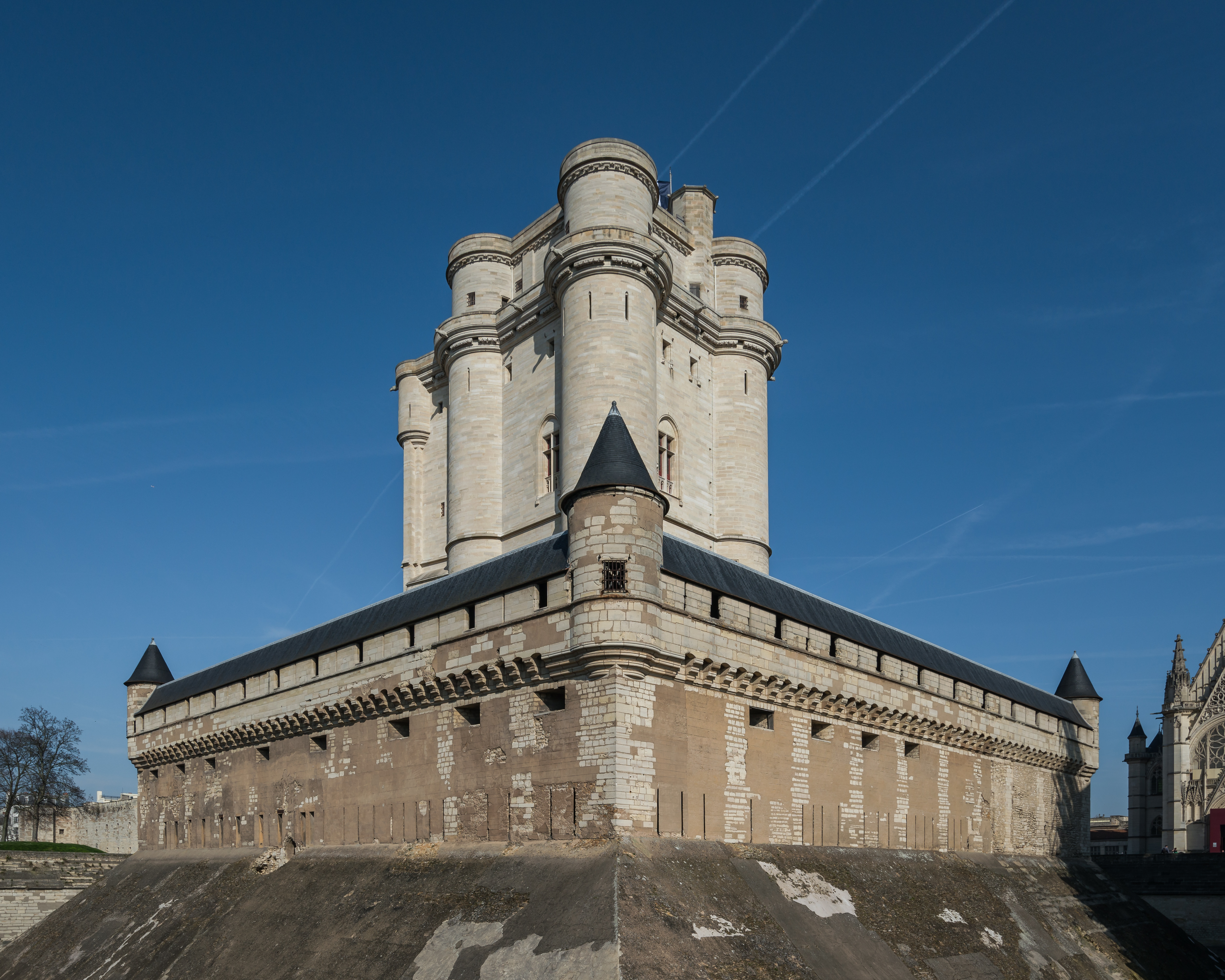
The keep of the Château de Vincennes (restored in the 1860s)

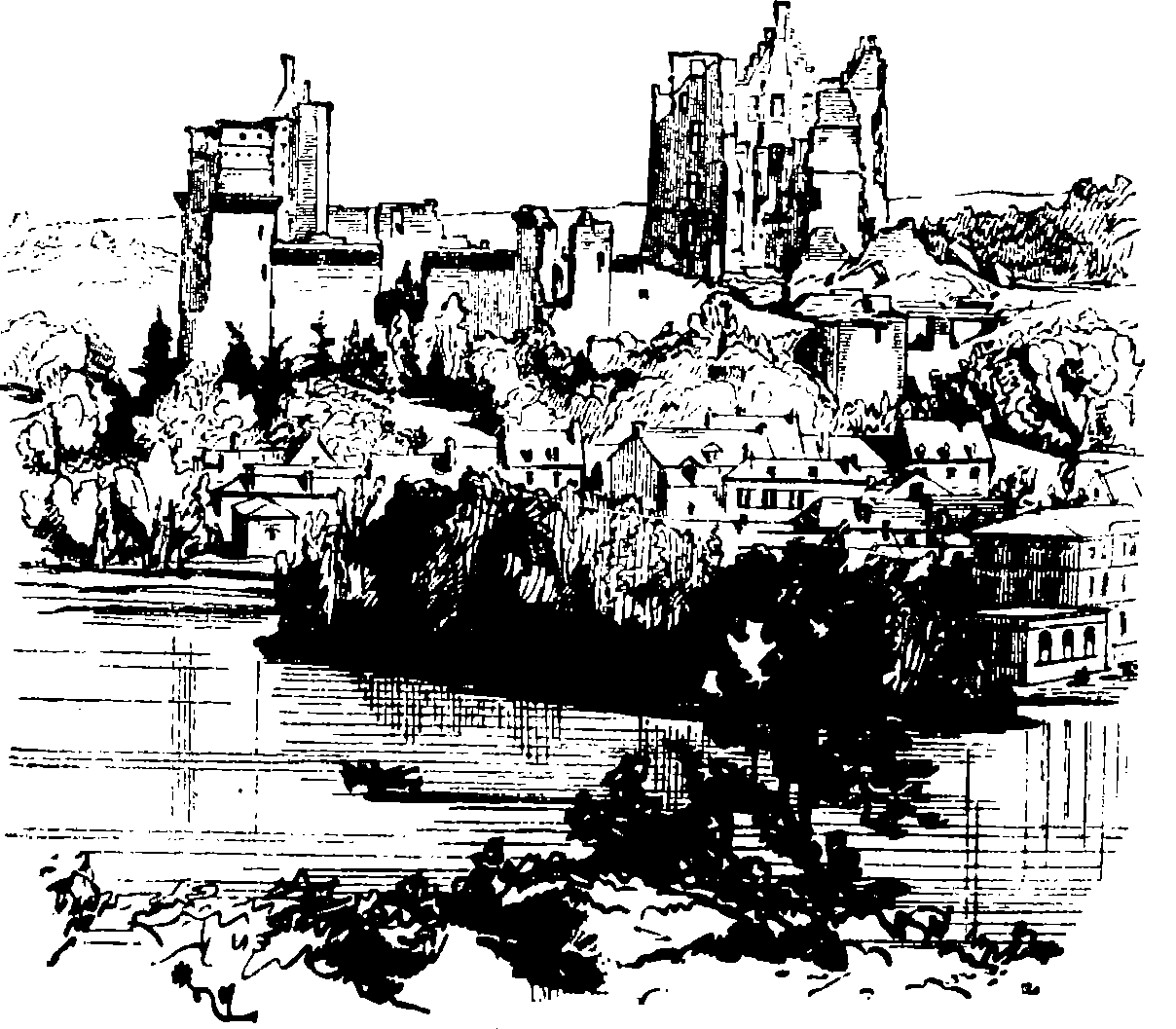
Drawing by VLD of the Château de Pierrefonds before restoration

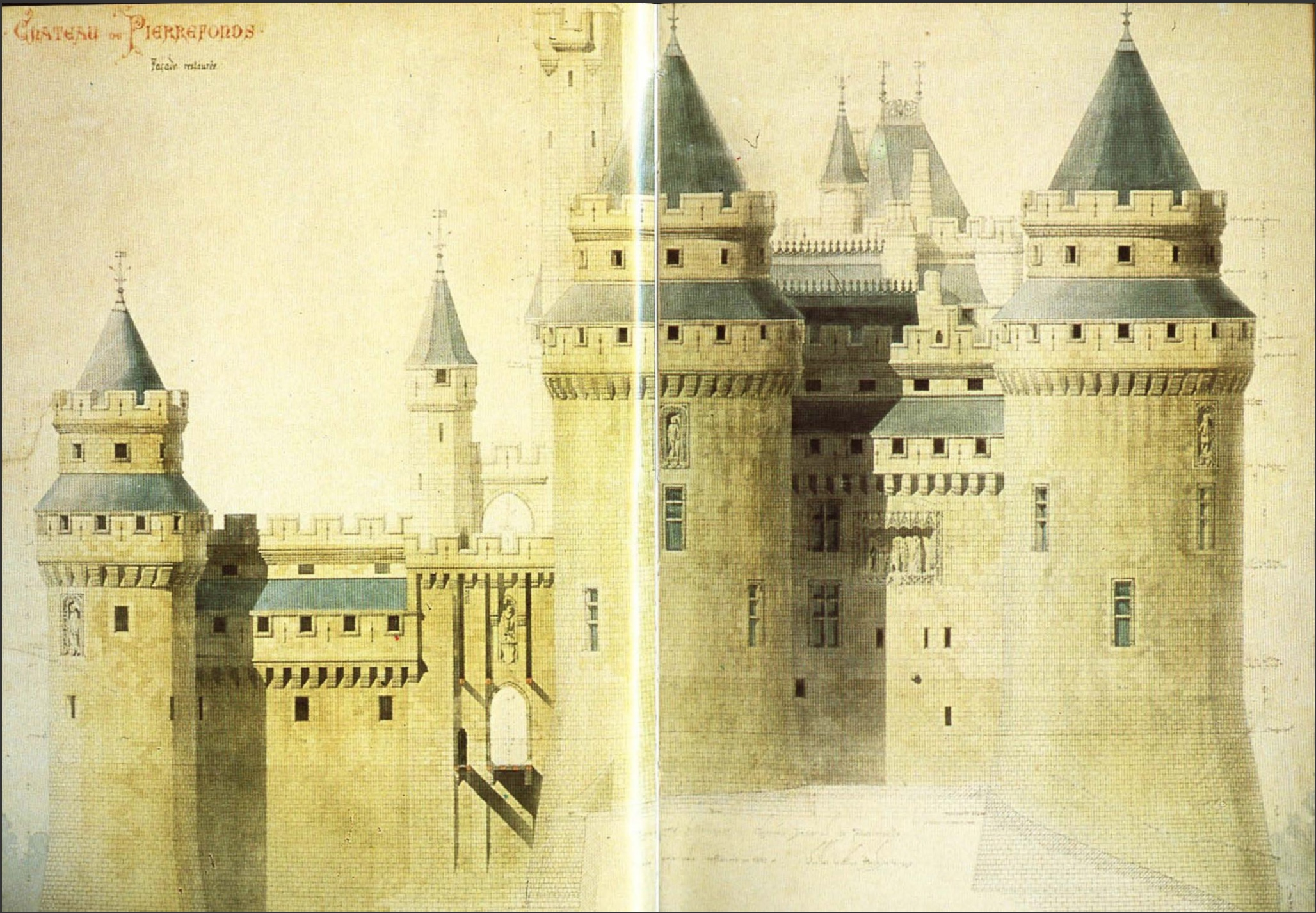
Plans of Pierrefonds by Viollet-le-Duc

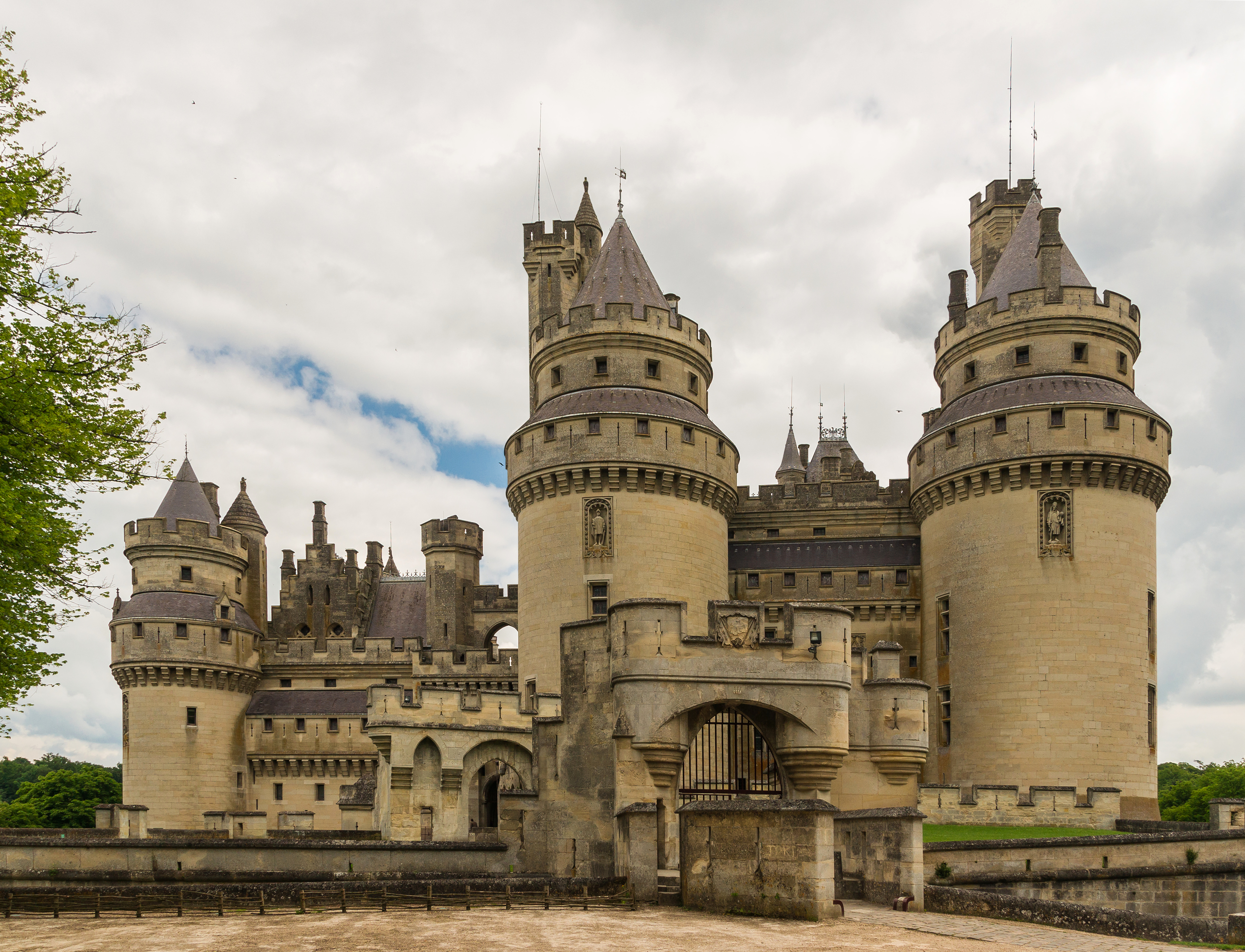
The Château de Pierrefonds today

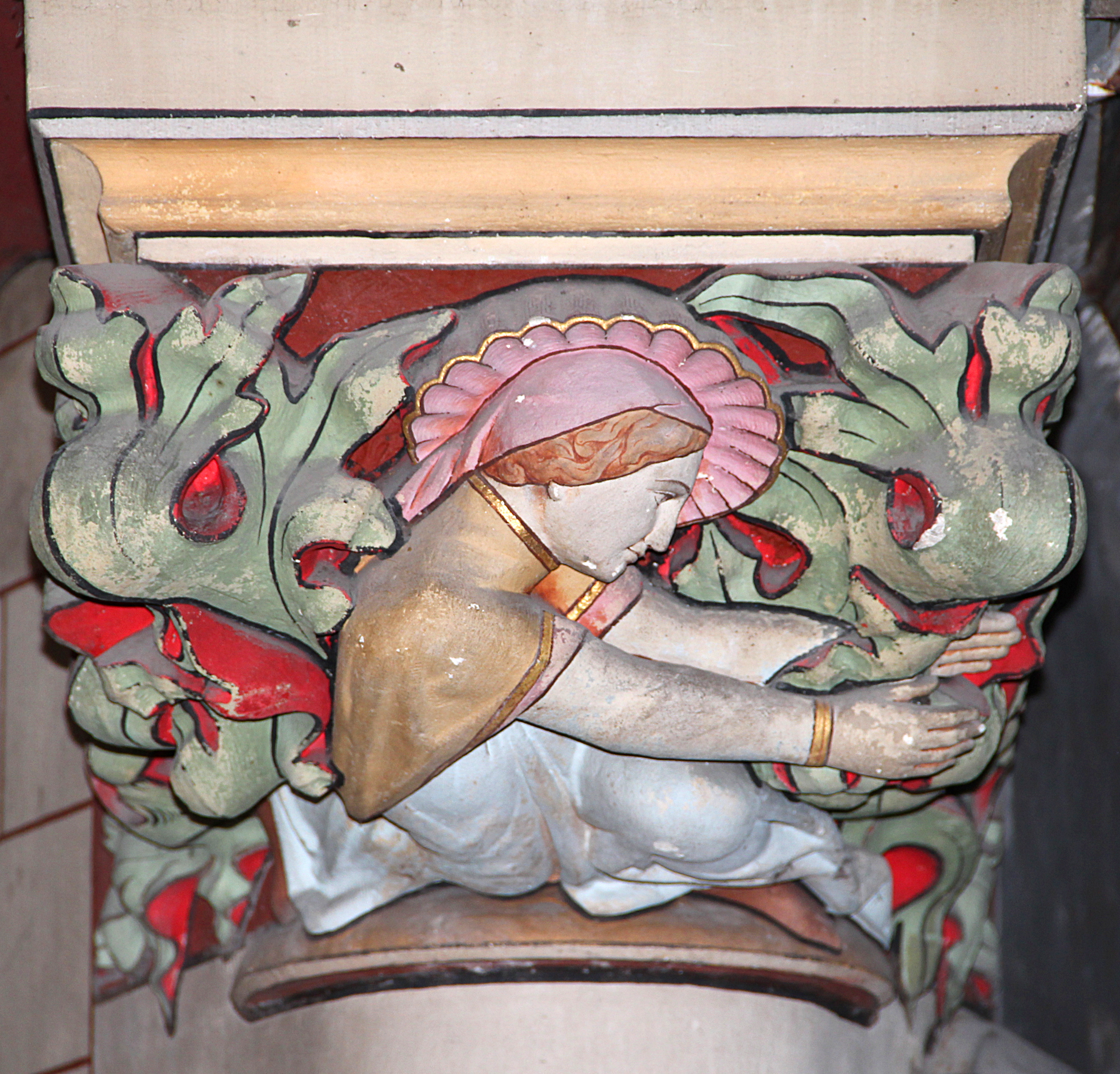
Polychrome decoration at Pierrefonds by Viollet-le-Duc

The French coup d'état of 1851 brought Napoleon III to power and transformed France from a republic to an empire. The coup accelerated some of Viollet-le-Duc's projects as his patron Prosper Mérimée had introduced him to the new Emperor. He moved forward with the slow work of restoration of the Cathedral of Reims and Cathedral of Amiens. In Amiens, he cleared the interior of the French classical decoration added under Louis XIV, and proposed to make it resolutely Gothic. He gave the Emperor a tour of his project in September 1853; the Empress immediately offered to pay two-thirds of the cost of the restoration. In the same year he undertook the restoration of the Château de Vincennes, long occupied by the military, along with its chapel, similar to Sainte-Chapelle. A devotee of the pure Gothic, he described the chapel as "one of the finest specimens of Gothic in decline".

In November 1853, he provided the costs and plans for the medieval ramparts of Carcassonne which he had first begun planning in 1849. The first fortifications had been built by the Visigoths; on top of these, in the Middle Ages Louis XI and then Philip the Bold had built a formidable series of towers, galleries, walls, gates and interlocking defences that resisted all sieges until 1355. The fortifications were largely intact, since the surroundings of the city were still a military defensive zone in the 19th century, but the towers were without tops and a large number of structures had been built up against the old walls. Once he obtained funding and made his plans, he began demolishing all structures which had been added to the ramparts over the centuries, and restored the gates, walls and towers to their original form, including the defence platforms, roofs on the towers and shelters for archers that would have been used during a siege. He found many of the original mountings for weapons still in place. To accompany his work, he published a detailed history of the city and its fortifications, with his drawings. Carcassonne became the best example of medieval military architecture in France, and also an important tourist attraction.

Napoleon III provided additional funding for the continued restoration of Notre-Dame. Viollet-le-Duc was also to replace the great bestiary of mythical beasts and animals which had decorated the cathedral in the 18th century. In 1856, using examples from other medieval churches and debris from Notre-Dame as his model, his workshop produced dragons, chimeras, grotesques, and gargoyles, as well as an assortment of picturesque pinnacles and fleurons. He engaged in a new project for restoration of the Cathedral of Clermont-Ferrand, a project which continued for ten years. He also undertook an unusual project for Napoleon III; the design and construction of six railway coaches with neo-Gothic interior décor for the Emperor and his entourage. Two of the cars still exist; the salon of honour car, with a fresco on the ceiling, is at the Château de Compiègne, and the dining car, with a massive golden eagle as the centrepiece of the décor, is at the Railroad Museum of Mulhouse.

Napoleon III asked Viollet-le-Duc if he could restore a medieval chateau for the Emperor's own use near Compiègne, where the Emperor traditionally passed September and October. Viollet-le-Duc first studied a restoration of the Château de Coucy, which had the highest medieval tower in France. When this proved too complicated, he settled upon Château de Pierrefonds, a castle begun by Louis of Orleans in 1396, then dismantled in 1617 after several sieges by Louis XIII. Napoleon bought the ruin for 5000 francs in 1812, and Mérimée declared it an historic monument in 1848. In 1857 Viollet-le-Duc began designing an entirely new chateau on the ruins. This structure was not designed to recreate anything exactly that had existed, but a castle which recaptured the spirit of the Gothic, with lavish neo-Gothic decoration and 19th-century comforts. Pierrefonds and its inside decorations would not only influence William Burges and his Cardiff and Coch castles but also the castles of Ludwig II of Bavaria (Neuschwanstein Castle) and the Haut-Kœnigsbourg of the Emperor Wilhelm II.

While most of his attention was devoted to restorations, Viollet-le-Duc designed and built a number of private residences and new buildings in Paris. He also participated in the most important competition of the period, for the new Paris Opera. There were one hundred seventy-one projects proposed in the original competition, presented the 1855 Paris Universal Exposition. A jury of noted architects narrowed it down to five, including projects from Viollet-le-Duc and Charles Garnier, age thirty-five. Viollet-le-Duc was finally eliminated and this put an end to Viollet le Duc's wish to construct public buildings. Napoleon III also called upon Viollet-le-Duc for a wide variety of archeological and architectural tasks. When he wished to put up a monument to mark the Battle of Alesia, where Julius Caesar defeated the Gauls, a siege whose actual site was disputed by historians, he asked Viollet-le-Duc to locate the exact battlefield. Viollet-le-Duc conducted excavations at various purported sites, and finally found vestiges of the walls built at the time. He also designed the metal frame for the six-metre-high statue of the Gallic chief Vercingetorix that would be placed on the site. He later designed a similar frame for a much larger statue, the Statue of Liberty, but died before that statue was finished.

== End of the Empire and of Restoration ==
In 1863, Viollet-le-Duc was named a professor at the École des Beaux-Arts, the school where he had refused to become a student. In the fortress of neoclassical Beaux-Arts architecture there was much resistance against him, but he attracted two hundred students to his course, who applauded his lecture at the end. But while he had many supporters, the faculty professors and certain students campaigned against him. His critics complained that, aside from having little formal architectural training himself, he had only built a handful of new buildings. He tired of the confrontations and resigned on 16 May 1863, and continued his writing and teaching outside the Beaux-Arts. In response to the Beaux-Arts he initiated the creation of the École Spéciale d'Architecture in Paris in 1865.

In the beginning of 1864, he celebrated the conclusion of his most important project, the restoration of Notre-Dame. In January of the same year he completed the first phase of the restoration of the Cathedral of Saint Sernin in Toulouse, one of the landmarks of French Romanesque architecture. Napoleon III invited Viollet-le-Duc to study possible restorations overseas, including in Algeria, Corsica, and in Mexico, where Napoleon had installed a new Emperor, Maximilian, under French sponsorship. He also saw the consecration of the third church that he had designed, the neo-Gothic church of Saint-Denis de l'Estree, in the Paris suburb of Saint-Denis. Between 1866 and 1870, his major project was the ongoing transformation of Pierrefonds from a ruin into a royal residence. His plans for the metal framework he had designed for Pierrefonds were displayed at the Paris Universal Exposition of 1867. He also began a new area of study, researching the geology and geography of the region around Mont Blanc in the Alps. While on his mapping excursion in the Alps in July 1870, he learned that war had been declared between Prussia and France.

As the Franco-Prussian War commenced, Viollet-le-Duc hurried back to Paris, and offered his services as a military engineer; he was put into service as a colonel of engineers, preparing the defenses of Paris. In September, the Emperor was captured at the Battle of Sedan, a new Republican government took power, and the Empress Eugénie fled into exile, as Germans marched as far as Paris and put it under siege. At the same time, on 23 September, Viollet-le-Duc's primary patron and supporter, Prosper Mérimée, died peacefully in the south of France. Viollet-le-Duc supervised the construction of new defensive works outside Paris. The war was a disaster as he wrote in his journal on 14 December 1870: "Disorganization is everywhere. The officers have no confidence in the troops, and the troops have no confidence in the officers. Each day, new orders and new projects which contravene those of the day before." He fought with the French army against the Germans at Buzenval on 24 January 1871. The battle was lost, and the French capitulated on 28 January. Viollet-le-Duc wrote to his wife on 28 February, "I don't know what will become of me, but I do not want to return any more to administration. I am disgusted by it forever, and want nothing more than to pass the years that remain to me in study and in the most modest possible life." Always the scholar, he wrote a detailed study of the effectiveness and deficiencies of the fortifications of Paris during the siege, which was to be used for the 1917 defense of Verdun and the construction of the Maginot line in 1938.

In May 1871 he left his home in Paris just before national guardsmen arrived to draft him into the armed force of the Paris Commune who subsequently condemned him to death. He escaped to Pierrefonds, where he had a small apartment before going in exile in Lausanne, where he engaged in his passion for mountains, making detailed maps and a series of thirty-two drawings of the alpine scenery. While in Lausanne he was also asked to undertake the restoration of the cathedral.

He returned later to Paris after the Commune had been suppressed and saw the ruins of most of the public buildings of the city, burned by the Commune in its last days. He received his only commission from the new government of the French Third Republic; Jules Simon, the new Minister of Culture and Public Instruction, asked him to design a plaque to be placed before Notre-Dame to honor the hostages killed by the Paris Commune in its final days.

The new government of the French Third Republic made little use of his expertise in the restoration of the major government buildings which had been burned by the Paris Commune, including the Tuileries Palace, the Palace of the Legion of Honor, the Palais-Royal, the library of the Louvre, the Ministry of Justice and the Ministry of Finance. The only reconstruction on which he was consulted was that of the Hotel de Ville. The writer Edmond de Goncourt called for leaving the ruin of the Hotel de Ville exactly as it was, "a ruin of a magical palace, A marvel of the picturesque. The country should not condemn it without appeal to restoration by Viollet-le-Duc." The government asked Viollet-le-Duc to organize a competition. He presented two options; to either restore the building to its original state, with its historic interior; or to demolish it and build a new city hall. In July 1872 the government decided to preserve the Renaissance facade, but otherwise to completely demolish and rebuild the building.

== Author and theorist ==
Throughout his life Viollet le Duc wrote over 100 publications on architecture, decoration, history, archeology etc.... some of which would become international best-sellers: Dictionary of French Architecture from 11th to 16th Century (1854–1868), Entretiens sur l'architecture (1863–1872), L'histoire d'une Maison (1873) and Histoire d'un Dessinateur: Comment on Apprend à Dessiner (1879).

In his Entretiens sur l'architecture he concentrated in particular on the use of iron and other new materials, and the importance of designing buildings whose architecture was adapted to their function, rather than to a particular style. The book was translated into English in 1881 and won a large following in the United States. The Chicago architect Louis Sullivan, one of the inventors of the skyscraper, often invoked the phrase, "Form follows function."

Lausanne Cathedral was his final major restoration project; it was rebuilt following his plans between 1873 and 1876. Work continued after his death. His reconstruction of the bell tower was later criticized; he eliminated the original octagonal base and added a new spire, which rested on the walls, and not on the vaulting, like the original spire. He also added new decoration, crowning the spire at mid-height with gables, another original element, and removing the original tiles. He was also criticized for the materials and ornaments he added to the towers, including gargoyles. His structural design was preserved, but in 1925 his gargoyles and original ornamentation were removed, and the spire was recovered with tiles.

His reputation had reached outside of France. The spire and roof of Strasbourg Cathedral had been damaged by German artillery during the Franco-Prussian War, and the city was now part of Germany. The German government invited Viollet-le-Duc to comment on their plans for the restoration, which involved a more grandiose Romanesque tower. Viollet-le-Duc informed the German architect that the planned new tower was completely out of character with the original facade and style of the cathedral. His advice was accepted, and the church was restored to its original form.

In 1872 Viollet-le-Duc was engaged in the reconstruction of the Château d'Amboise, owned by the descendants of the former King, Louis-Philippe. The chateau had been confiscated by Napoleon III in 1848 but was returned to the family in 1872. It was a massive project to turn it into a residence, involving at times three hundred workers. Viollet-le-Duc designed all the work to the finest details, including the floor tiles, the gas lights in the salons, the ovens in the kitchen, and the electric bells for summoning servants.

In 1874 Viollet-le-Duc resigned as diocesan architect of Paris and was succeeded by his contemporary, Paul Abadie. In his final years, he continued to supervise the restoration projects that were underway for the Commission of Historical Monuments. He engaged in polemics about architecture in the press, and was elected to the Paris municipal council.

== Statue of Liberty ==
While planning the design and construction of the Statue of Liberty (Liberty Enlightening the World) sculptor Frédéric Auguste Bartholdi interested Viollet-le-Duc, his friend and mentor, in the project. As chief engineer, Viollet-le-Duc designed a brick pier within the statue, to which the skin would be anchored. After consultations with the metalwork foundry Gaget, Gauthier & Co., Viollet-le-Duc chose the metal which would be used for the skin, copper sheets, and the method used to shape it, repoussé, in which the sheets were heated and then struck with wooden hammers. An advantage of this choice was that the entire statue would be light for its volume, as the copper need be only 0.094 inches (2.4 mm) thick.

== National Museum of French Monuments and final years ==
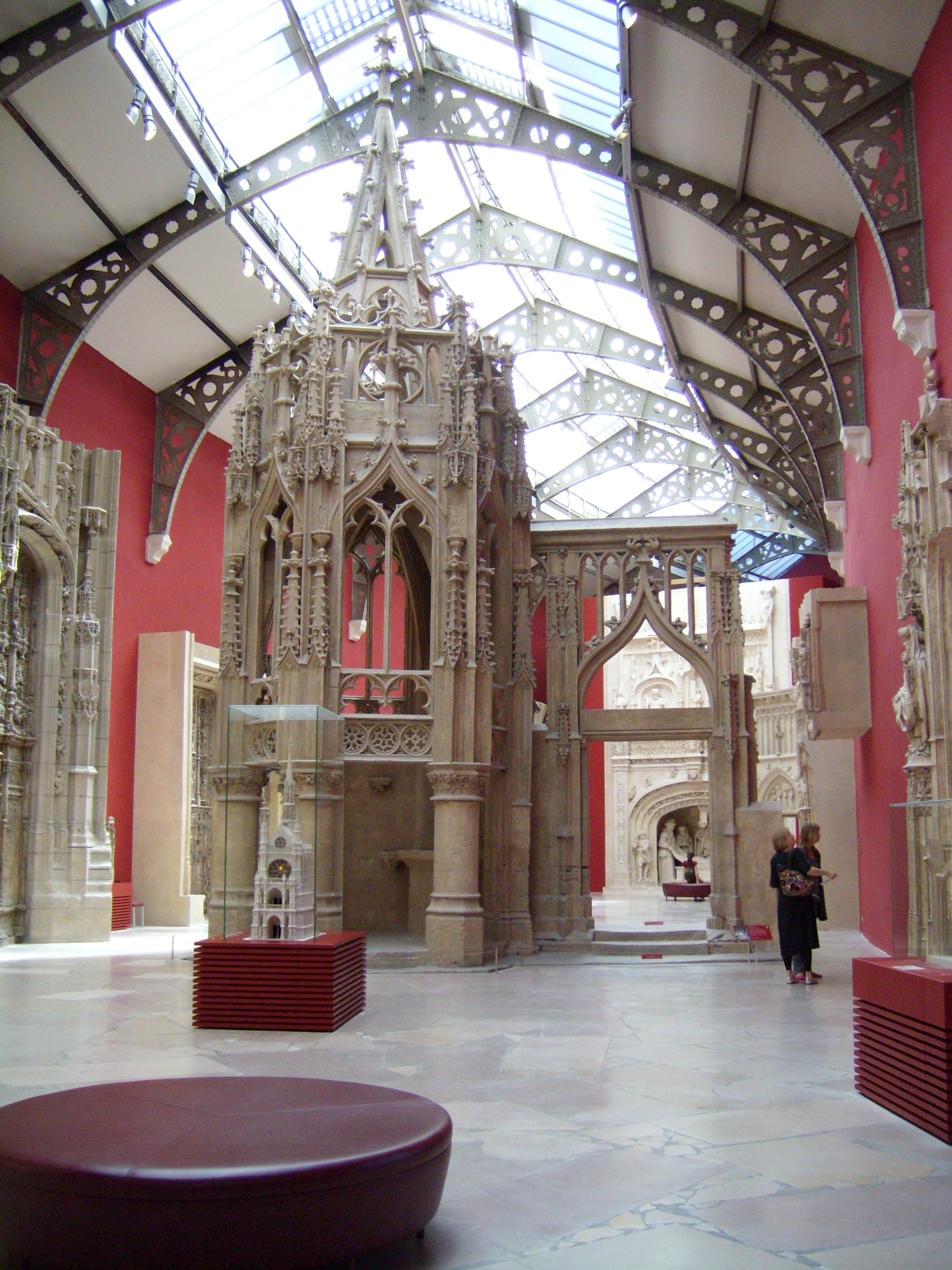
The National Museum of French Monuments

He became engaged in the planning and construction of the Paris Universal Exposition of 1878. He proposed to the Minister of Education, Jules Ferry, that the Trocadéro Palace, the main building of the Exposition on the hilltop of Chaillot, be transformed after the Exposition into a museum of French monuments, displaying models of architecture and sculpture from landmarks around France. This idea was accepted. The National Museum of French Monuments opened in 1882, after his death. The Palais was reconstructed into the Palais de Chaillot in 1937, but the Museum of French Monuments was preserved and can be seen there today.

In his final years his son Eugène-Louis became the head of the Commission of Historic Monuments. He took on just one new project, the restoration of the cloister of the Augustines at Toulouse. He completed his series of dictionaries of architectural periods, designed for a general audience. He also devoted more time to studying the geography of the Alps around Mont-Blanc. He spent his summers hiking in the mountains and writing articles about his travels. He launched a public campaign for the re-forestation of the Alps, and published a detailed map of the area in 1876. He spent more and more time at La Vedette, the villa he constructed in Lausanne, a house on the model of a Savoyard chalet, but with a minimum of decoration, illustrating his new doctrine of form following function. He made one last visit to inspect Carcassonne, whose work was now under his son's direction. After an exhausting summer of hiking in the Alps in 1879, he became ill and died in Lausanne on 17 September 1879. He was buried in the cemetery of La Sallaz in Lausanne. In 1946 his grave and monument were transferred to the Cemetery of Bois-le-Vaux (Section XVIII) in Lausanne.

His final decades of work also focused on the geology of the Alps, including studies of glaciation and topography.

== Family ==
Viollet-le-Duc married Elisabeth Tempier in Paris on 3 May 1834. The couple had two children, but separated a few years after marriage, and spent little time together; he was continually on the road. The writer Geneviève Viollet-le-Duc (winner of the prix Broquette-Gonin in 1978) was his great-granddaughter.

== Doctrine ==
Viollet-le-Duc famously defined restoration in volume eight of his Dictionnaire raisonné de l'architecture française du XI au XVI siecle of 1858: "To restore a building is not to maintain it, repair it or remake it: it is to re-establish it in a complete state which may never have existed at any given moment." He then explained that it had to meet four conditions: (1) The "re-establishment" had to be scientifically documented with plans and photographs and archeological records, which would guarantee exactness. (2) The restoration had to involve not just the appearance of the monument, or the effect that it produced, but also its structure; it had to use the most efficient means to assure the long life of the building, including using more solid materials, used more wisely. (3) the restoration had to exclude any modification contrary to obvious evidence; but the structure could be adapted to conform to more modern or rational uses and practices, which meant alterations to the original plan; and (4) The restoration should preserve older modifications made to the building, with the exception of those which compromised its stability or its conservation, or those which gravely violated the value of its historical presence.

He drew conclusions from medieval architecture that he applied to modern architecture. He noted that it was sometimes necessary to employ an iron frame in restoration to avoid the danger of fires, as long as the new structure was not heavier than the original, and kept the original balance of forces found in medieval structures. "The monuments of the Middle Ages were carefully calculated, and their organism is delicate. There is nothing in excess in their works, nothing useless. If you change one of the conditions of these organisms, you change all the others. Many people consider this a fault; for us, this is a quality which we too often neglect in our modern construction....Why should we build expensive walls two meters thick, if walls fifty centimeters thick [with reinforced supports], offer sufficient stability? In the structure of the Middle Ages, every portion of a work fulfilled a function and possessed an action."

== Gothic vs. Beaux-Arts ==
During the entire career of Viollet-le-Duc, he was engaged in a dispute with the doctrines of the École des Beaux-Arts, the leading architectural school of France, which he refused to attend as a student, and where he taught briefly as a professor, before being pressured to depart. In 1846 he engaged in a fervent exchange in print with Quatremère de Quincy, the Perpetual Secretary of the French Academy, on the question, "Is it suitable, in the 19th century, to build churches in the Gothic style?" De Quincy and his followers denounced the Gothic style as incoherent, disorderly, unintelligent, decadent and without taste. Viollet-le-Duc responded, "What we want, messieurs, is the return of an art which was born in our country....Leave to Rome what belongs to Rome, and to Athens what belongs to Athens. Rome didn't want our Gothic (and was perhaps the only one in Europe to reject it) and they were right, because when one has the good fortune to possess a national architecture, the best thing is to keep it."

"If you study for a moment a church of the 13th century", he wrote, "you see that all of the construction is carried out according to an invariable system. All the forces and the weights are thrust out to the exterior, a disposition which gives the interior the greatest open space possible. The flying buttresses and contreforts alone support the entire structure, and always have an aspect of resistance, of force and stability which reassures the eye and the spirit; The vaults, built with materials that are easy to mount and to place at a great height, are combined in an easy disposition that places the totality of their weight on the piles; that the most simple means are always employed...and that all the parts of these constructions, independent of each other, even as they rely on each other, present an elasticity and a lightness needed in a building of such great dimensions. We can still see (and this is only found in Gothic architecture) that human proportions are the one fixed rule."

== Controversy ==
Viollet-le-Duc was often accused by certain critics, in his own time and later, of pursuing the spirit of the Gothic style in some of his restorations instead of strict historical accuracy. Many art historians also consider that the British architectural writer John Ruskin and William Morris were ferocious opponents of Viollet le Duc's restorations. But Ruskin never criticised Viollet le Duc's restoration work in itself, but criticised the principle of restoration itself. Indeed, at the beginning of his career Ruskin had a very radical opinion on restoration: "a building should be looked after and if not it should be left to die". Viollet le Duc's position on the subject was more nuanced: "if a building has not been upkept it should be restored".

The existence of an opposition between Ruskin and Viollet le Duc on restoration is today questioned by new research based on Ruskin's own writings: "there is no book on architecture which has everything correct apart from Viollet le Duc's Dictionary". And at the end of his life Ruskin expressed the regret that "no one in England had done the work that Viollet le Duc had done in France".

Viollet-le-Duc's restorations sometimes involved non-historical additions, either to assure the stability of the building, or sometimes simply to maintain the harmony of the design. The flèche or spire of Notre-Dame de Paris, which had been constructed in about 1250, was removed in 1786 after it was damaged by the wind. Viollet-le-Duc designed and constructed a new spire, ornamented with statuary, which was taller than the original and modified to resist the weather, but in harmony with the rest of the design. In the 19th and 20th century, his flèche was a target for critics.

He was also criticized later for his modifications of the choir of Notre-Dame, which had been rebuilt in the Louis XIV style during the reign of that king. Viollet-le-Duc took out the old choir, including the altar where Napoleon Bonaparte had been crowned Emperor and replaced them with a Gothic altar and decoration which he designed. When he modified the choir, he also constructed new bays with small Gothic rose windows modelled on those in the church of Chars, in the Oise Valley. Some historians condemned these restorations as non-historical invention. His defenders pointed out that Viollet-le-Duc did not make any decisions on the restoration of Notre-Dame by himself; all of his plans were approved by Prosper Mérimée, the Inspector of Historical Monuments, and by the Commission of historic monuments.

He was criticized for the abundance of Gothic gargoyles, chimeras, fleurons, and pinnacles which he added to Notre-Dame Cathedral. These decorations had existed in the Middle Ages but had largely been removed during the reign of Louis XIV. The last original gargoyles had been taken down in 1813. He modelled the new gargoyles and monsters on examples from other cathedrals of the period.

He was later criticized also for the stained glass windows he designed and had made for the chapels around the ground level of the cathedral, which feature intricate Gothic designs in grisaille, which allow more light into the church. The contemporary view of the controversy of his restoration is summarized on a descriptive panel near the altar of the cathedral: "The great restoration, carried to fruition by Viollet-le-Duc following the death of Lassus, supplied new radiance to the cathedral – whatever reservations one might have about the choices that were made. The work of the nineteenth century is now as much a part of the architectural history of Notre-Dame as that undertaken in previous centuries."

The restoration of ramparts of Carcassonne was also criticized in the 20th century. His critics pointed out that the pointed caps of the towers he constructed were more typical of northern France, not the region where Carcassonne was located, near the Spanish border. Similarly he added roofs of northern slate tiles rather than southern clay tiles, a choice that has been reversed in more recent restorations. His critics also claimed that Viollet-le-Duc sought a "condition of completeness" which never actually existed at any given time. The principal counter-argument made by Viollet-le-Duc's defenders was that, without his prompt restorations, many of the buildings that he restored would have been lost, and that he did the best that he could with the knowledge that was then available.

Mortimer Wheeler's entry on English archaeologist Charles R Peers for the Dictionary of National Biography (1971) is worth quoting for its critique of Viollet-le-Duc: "he [Peers] laid down the principles which have governed architectural conservation in the United Kingdom and have served as a model in other parts of the world. His cardinal principle was to retain but not to restore the surviving remains of an ancient structure; and in this respect he departed emphatically from the tradition of Viollet-le-Duc and his successors in France and Italy, where exuberant restoration frequently obscured the evidence upon which it was based ..."

== Existing buildings designed and constructed by Viollet-le-Duc ==
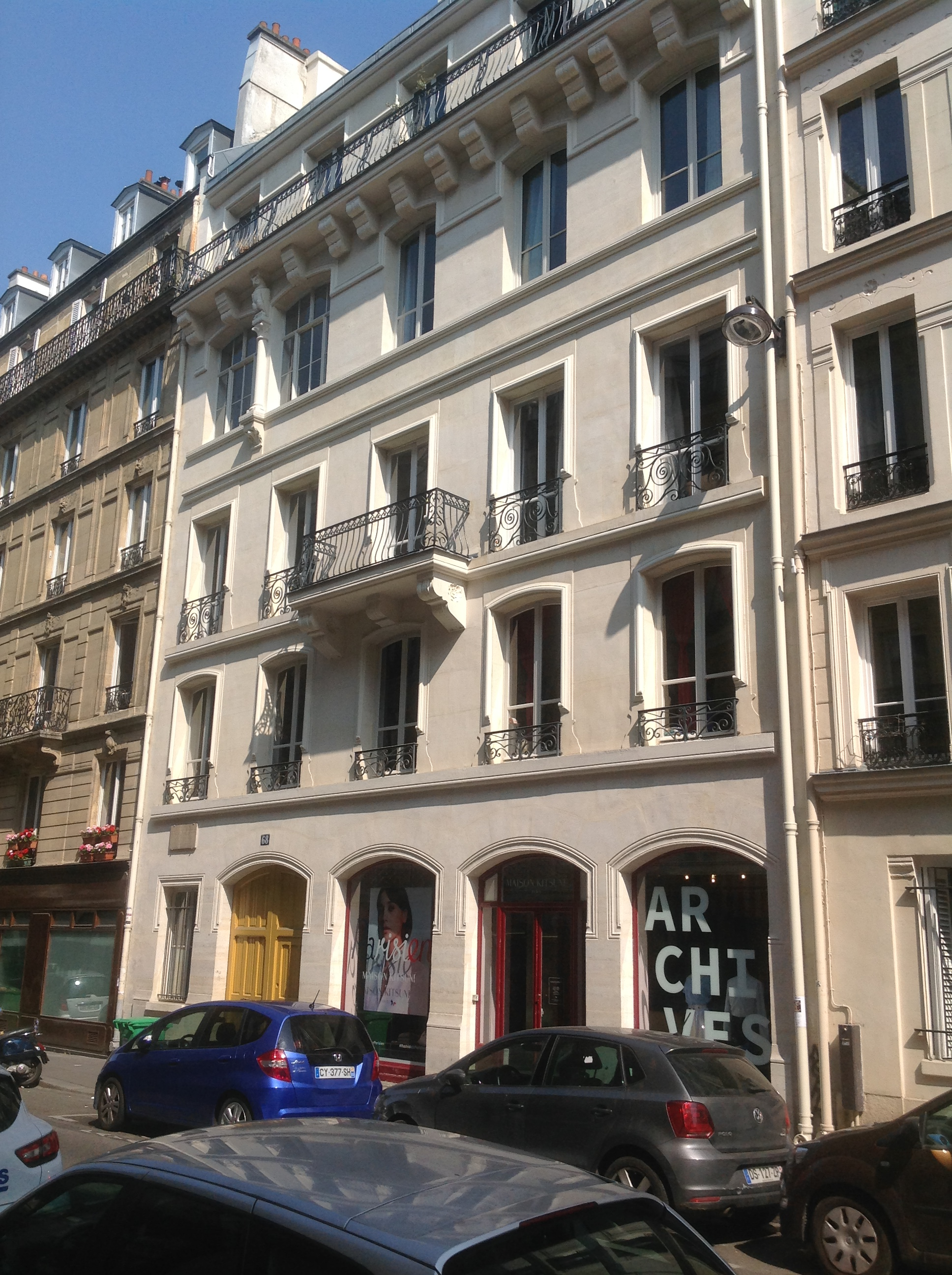
Residence and studio of Viollet-le-Duc at 68 rue Condorcet, Paris (1862)

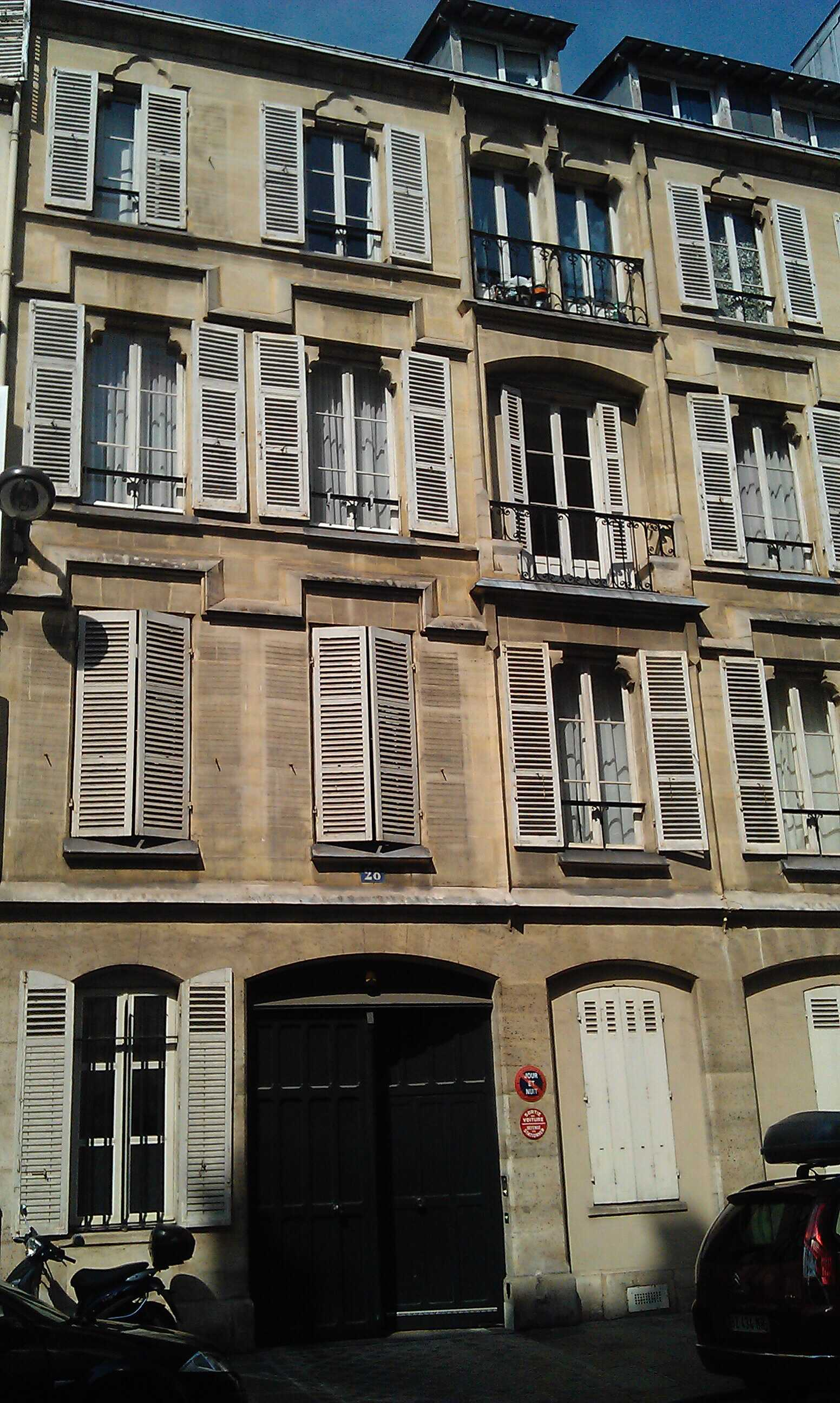
Maison Courmont, 28 rue de Liège, Paris

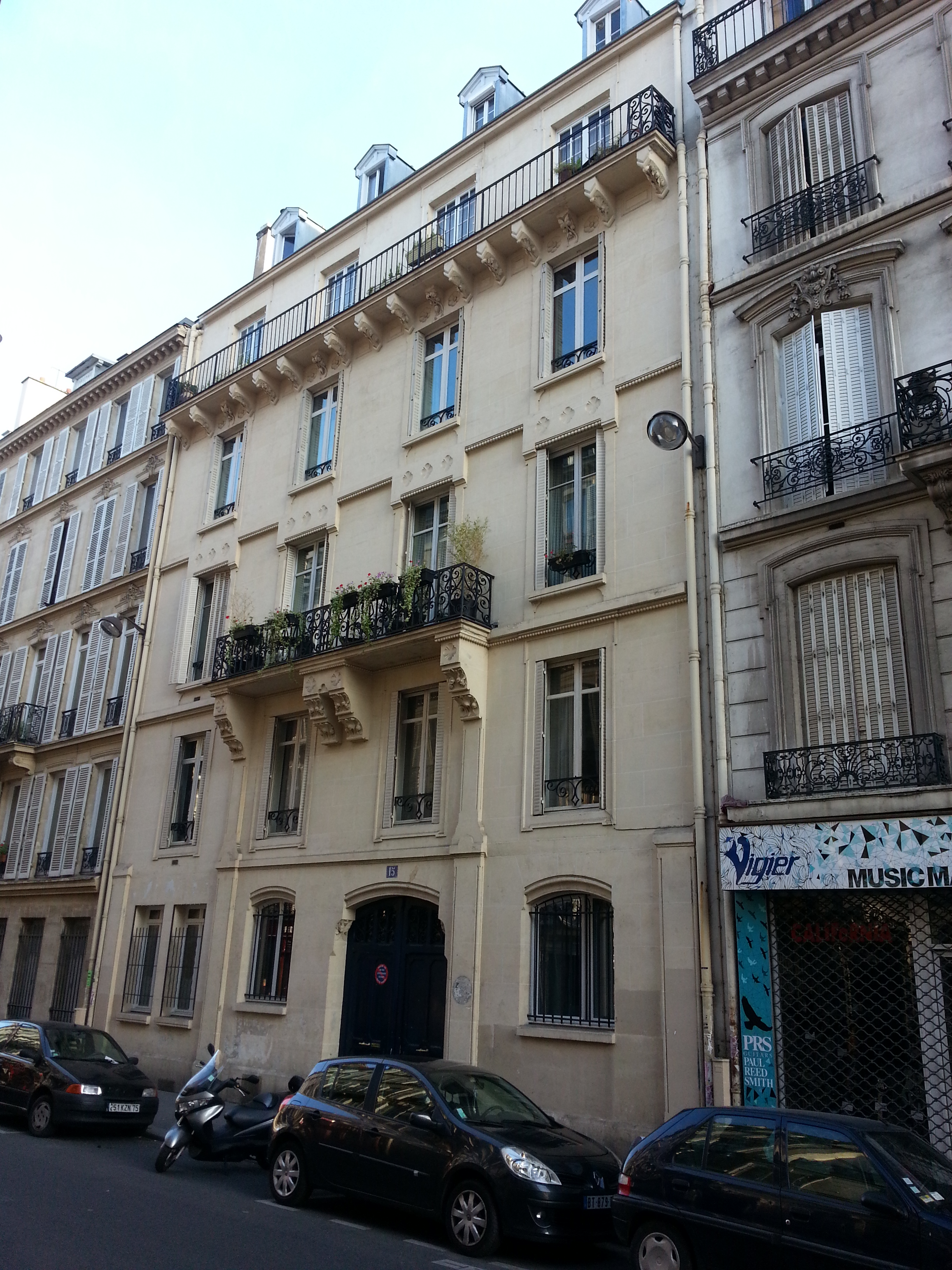
15 rue de Douai, Paris

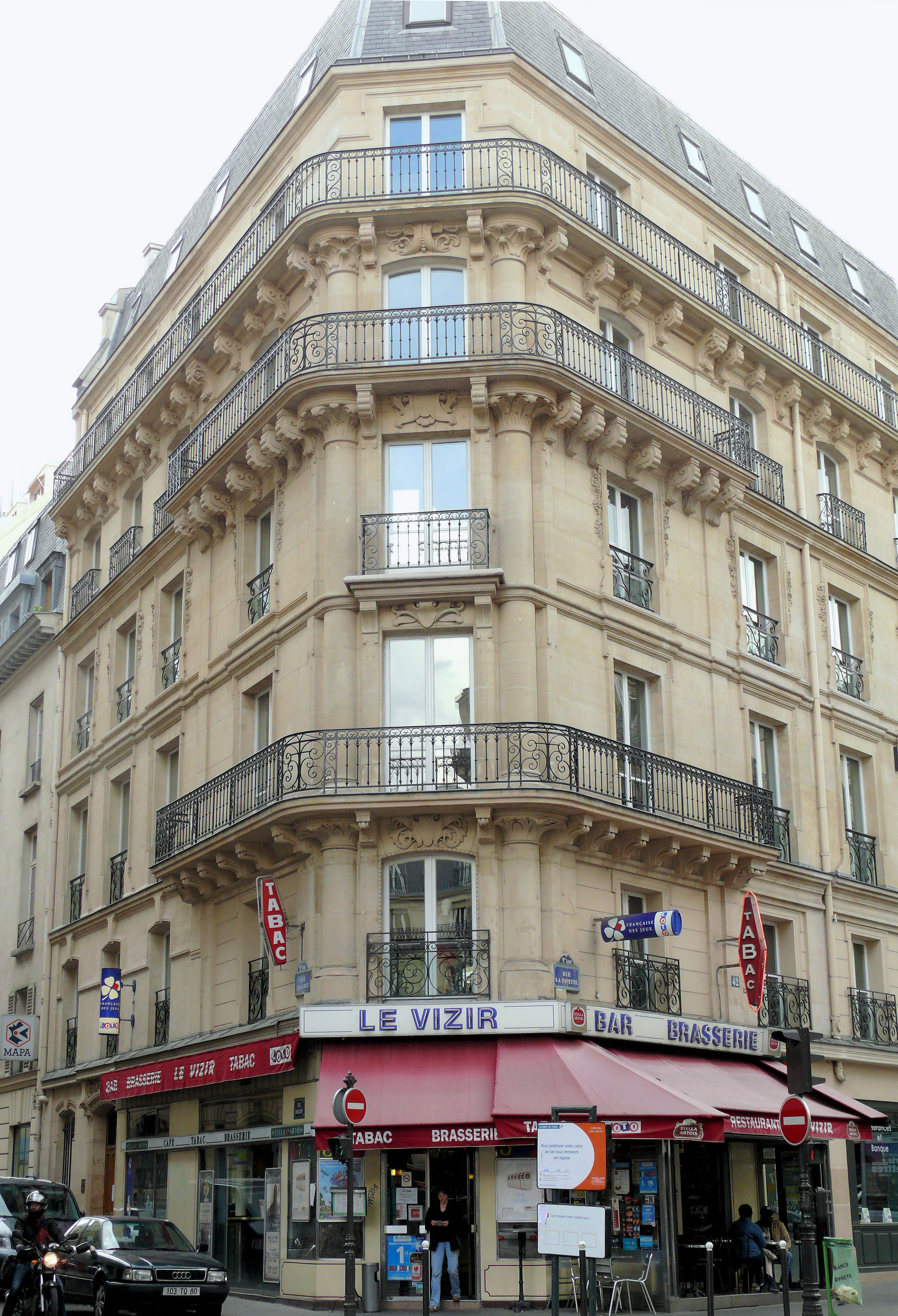
23 rue Chauchat, Paris

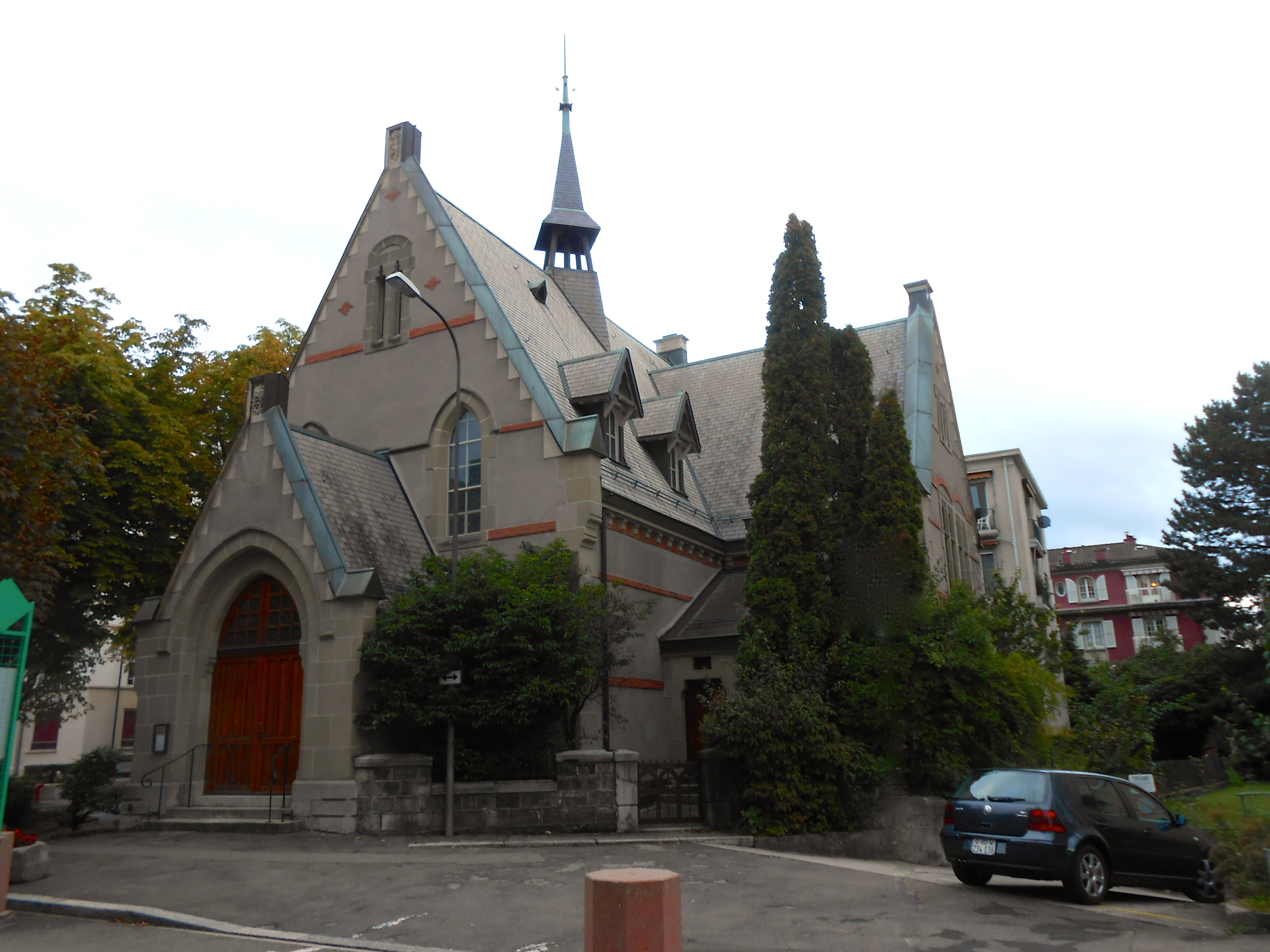
Scots Kirk, Avenue de Rumine 26, Lausanne, Switzerland (1879)

== Partial list of restorations ==
Churches

- Basilica of St. Mary Magdalene in Vézelay
- St. Martin in Clamecy
- Notre-Dame in Paris
- Sainte-Chapelle in Paris (under Félix Duban)
- Basilica of St. Denis near Paris
- St. Louis in Poissy
- Notre-Dame in Semur-en-Auxois
- Basilica of St. Nazarius and St. Celsus in Carcassonne
- Basilica of St. Sernin, Toulouse
- Notre-Dame in Lausanne, Switzerland

Town halls

- Ancien Hôtel de Ville de Saint-Antonin-Noble-Val
- Hôtel de Ville de Narbonne

Castles

- Château de Roquetaillade, in Bordeaux
- Château de Pierrefonds
- Fortified city of Carcassonne
- Château de Coucy
- Antoing in Belgium
- Château de Vincennes, Paris
- Château d'Amboise, Amboise

== Partial list of architectural design ==
- Château du Tertre, Ambrières-les-Vallées (Mayenne)
- Château d'Abbadia (Hendaye)
- Château de la Flachère, Saint-Vérand (Rhône)
- Saint-Gimer Church, Carcassonne, Carcassonne (Aude)
- Scots Kirk, Lausanne, Suisse
- Saint-Martin Church, Aillant-sur-Tholon (Yonne)
- Château de Montdardier, Montdardier (Gard)
- Château Jacquesson, Châlons-en-Champagne (Marne)
- Église Saint-Denis-de-l'Estrée, Saint-Denis (Seine-Saint-Denis)
- Duc de Morny's Funeral chapel, cemetery du Père-Lachaise, Paris
- Barons d'Arbelles' Funeral chapel, cemetery des Carmes, Clermont-Ferrand (Puy-de-Dôme)
- Indoor mainrooms, Château de Pregny, Pregny (Suisse)

== Partial list of buildings ==
- Building, 28 rue de Liège, Paris (1846)
- Building, 80 boulevard du Montparnasse, Paris (1859)
- Building, 15 rue de Douai, Paris (1860)
- His own property, building, 68 rue Condorcet, Paris (1862)
- Building, 23 rue Chauchat - 42 rue Lafayette, Paris (1864)

== Restorations by Viollet-le-Duc ==
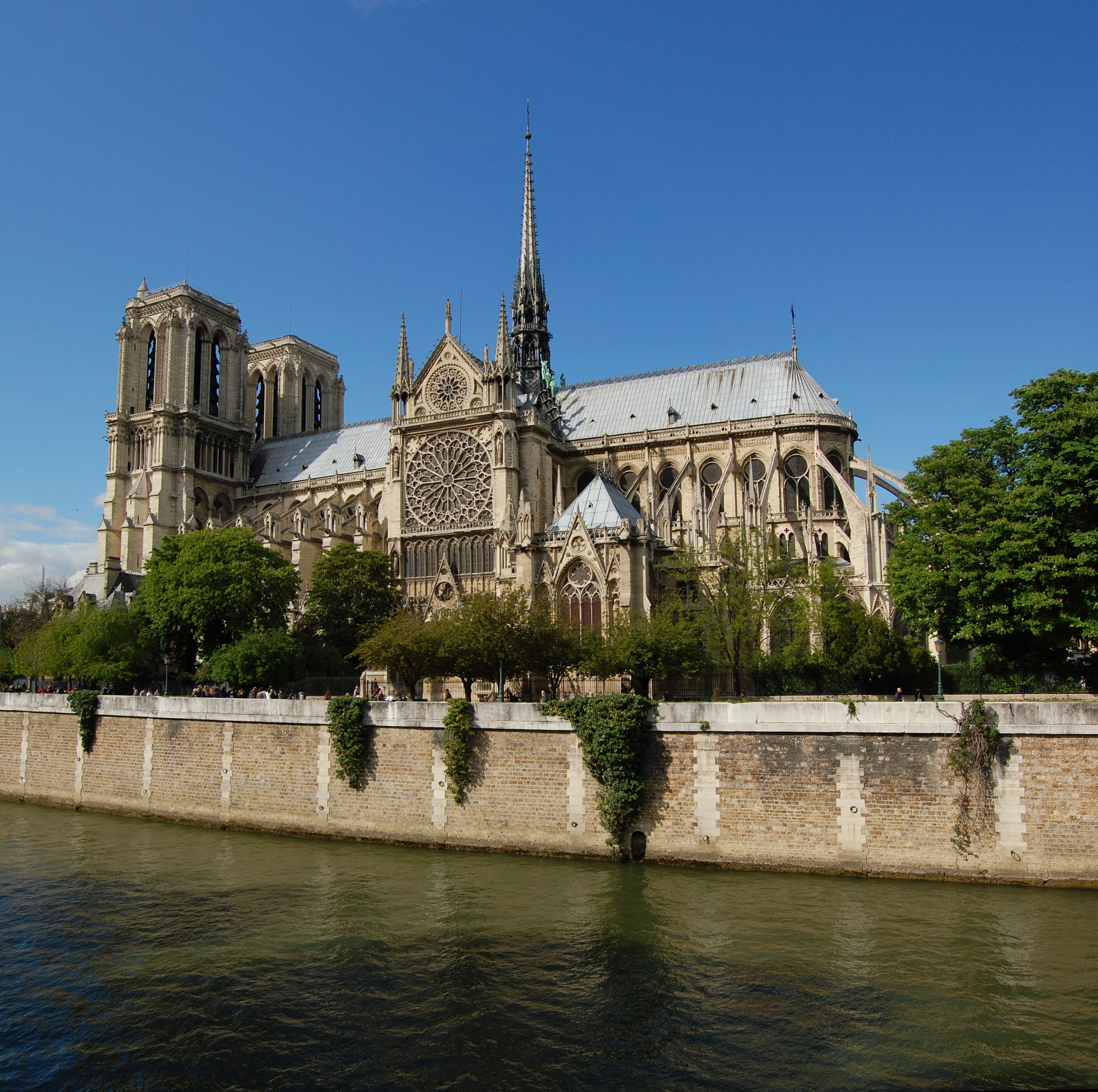
Notre-Dame de Paris (restored 1845–1870)

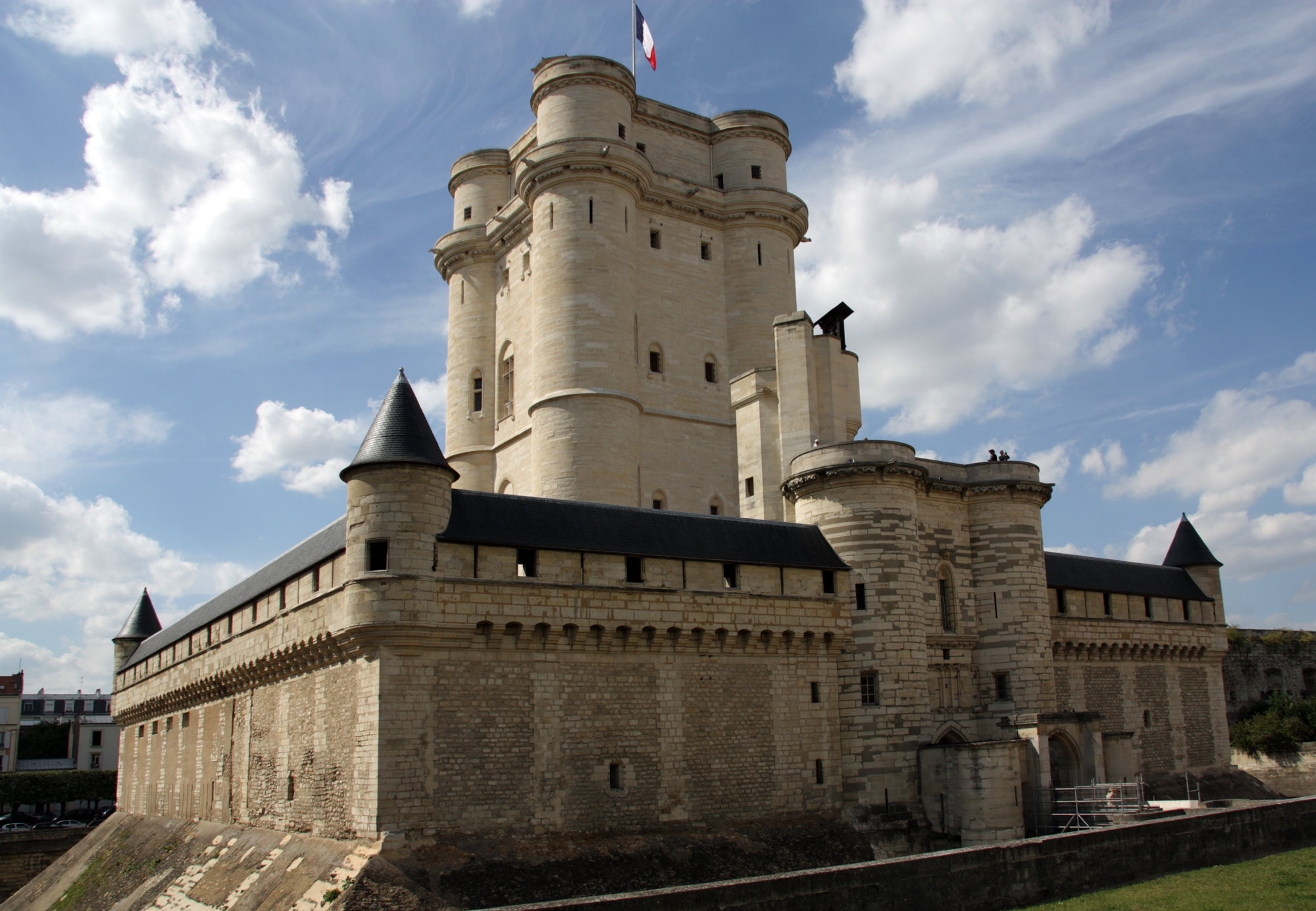
The keep of the Château de Vincennes (restored in the 1860s)

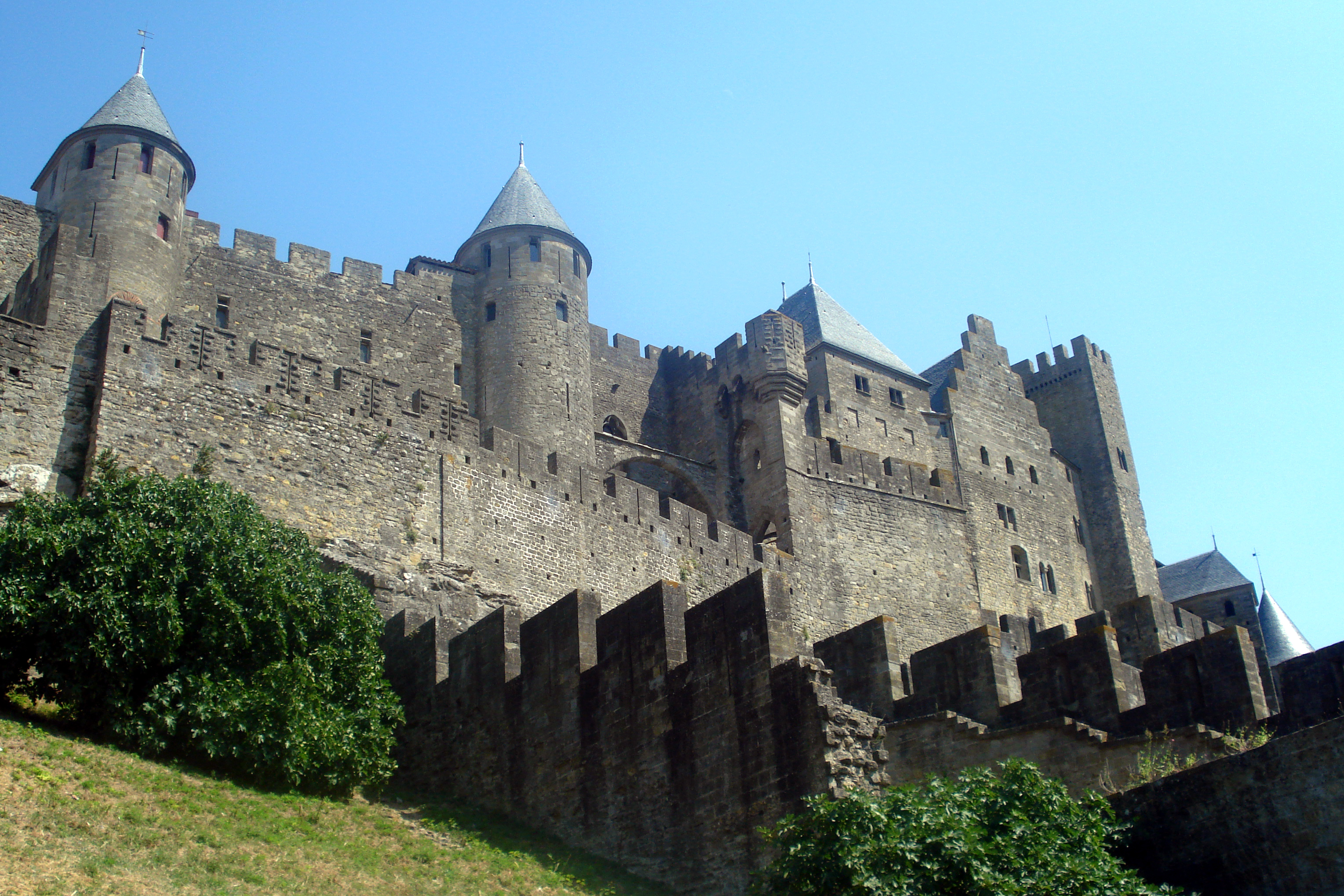
The walled town of Carcassonne (restored 1853–1879)

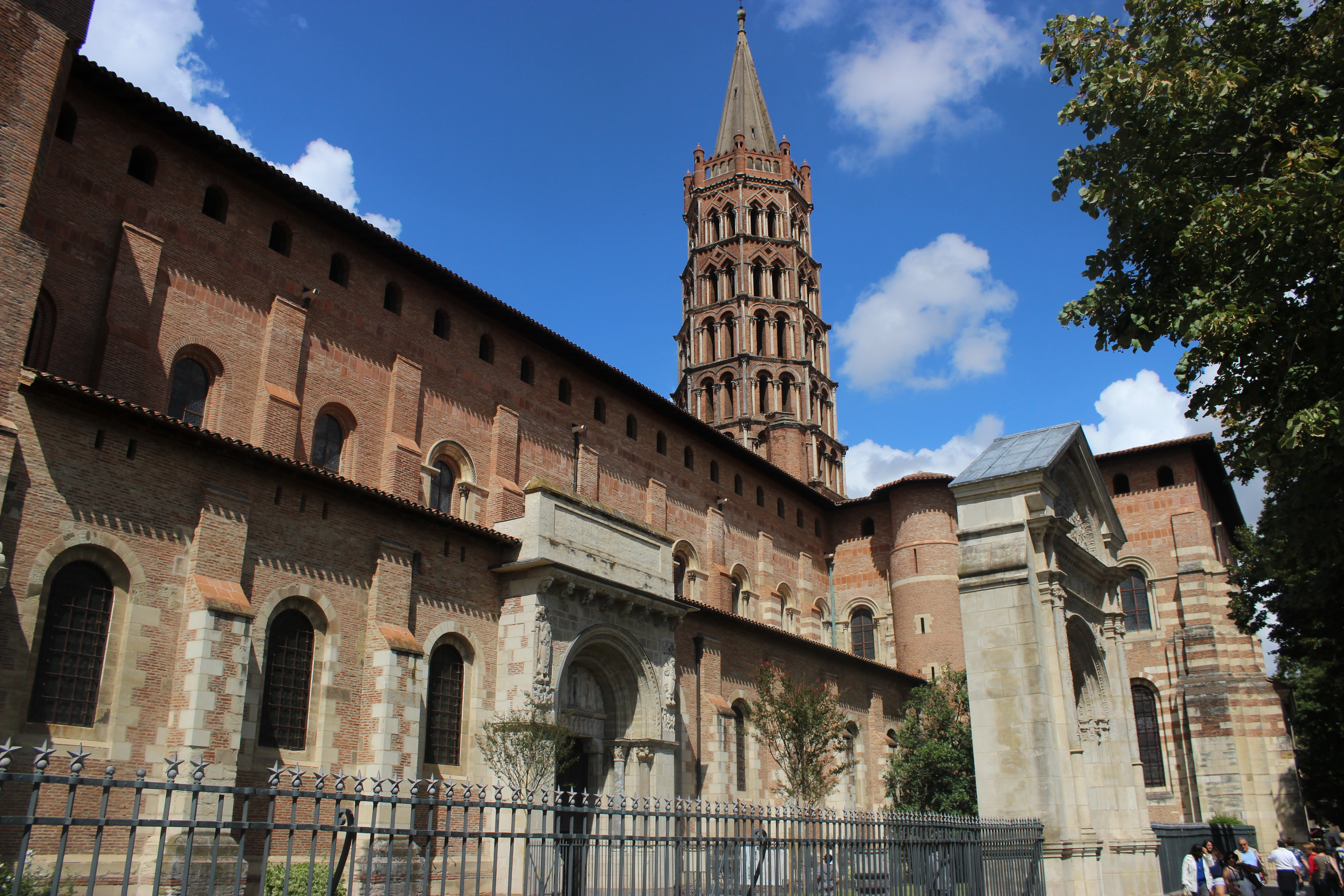
Basilica of Saint-Sernin, Toulouse (restored in the 1860s to the 1880s)

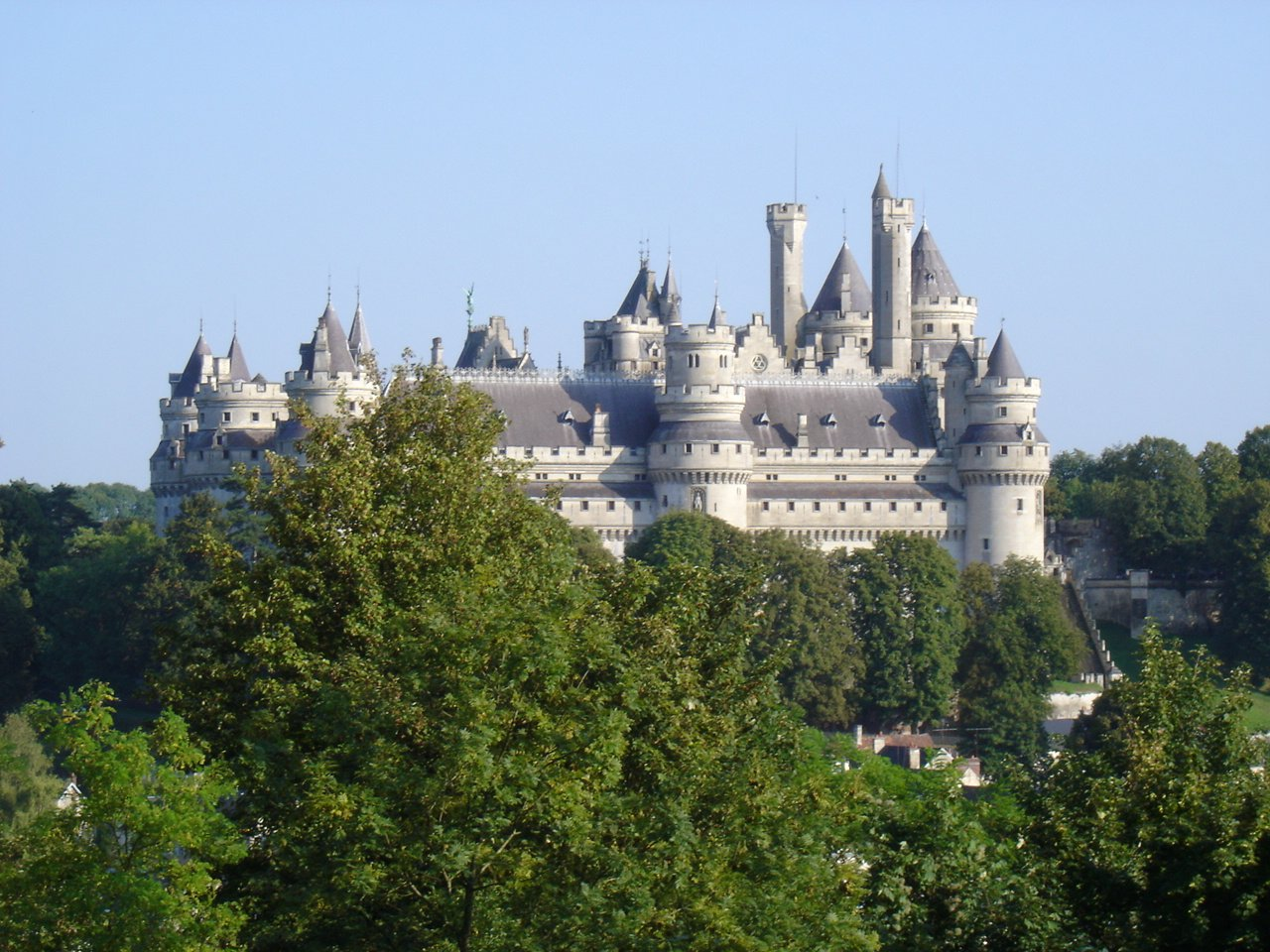
Château de Pierrefonds (carried out 1857–1885)

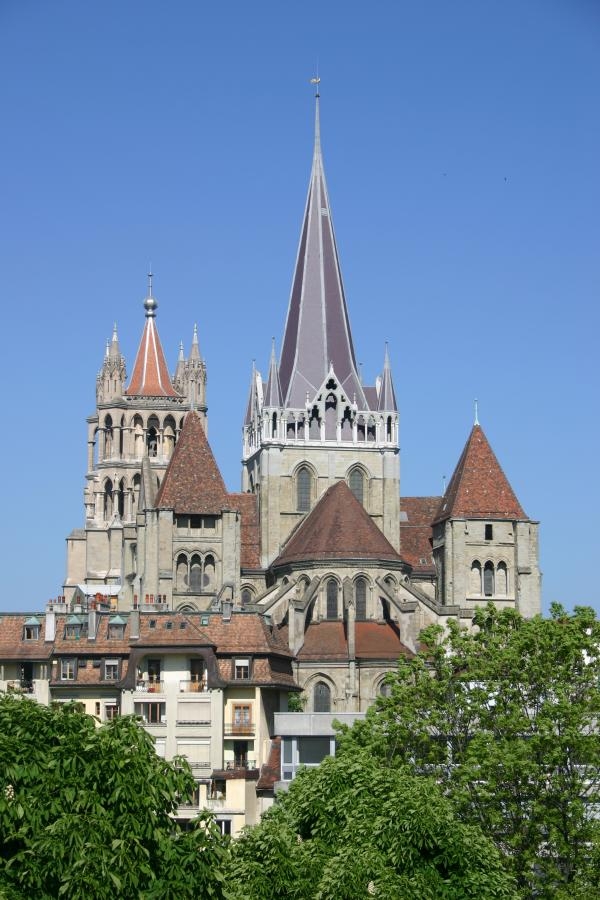
Lausanne Cathedral, Switzerland (restored 1874–1910)

== Publications ==
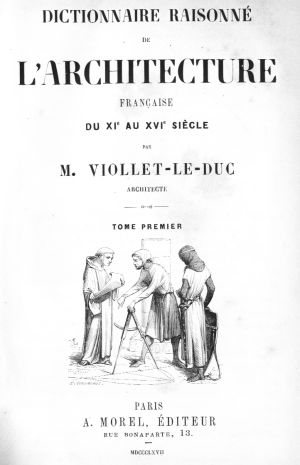
Front cover of the Dictionnaire Raisonné de L'Architecture Française du XIe au XVIe siècle, A. Morel editor, Paris, 1868

Throughout his career Viollet-le-Duc made notes and drawings, not only for the buildings he was working on but also on Romanesque, Gothic and Renaissance buildings that were to be soon demolished. His notes were useful when preparing his published works. His study of medieval and Renaissance periods was not limited to architecture but extended also to such areas as furniture, clothing, musical instruments, armament, and geology.

His work was published, first in serial form, and then as full-scale books, as:

- Dictionary of French Architecture from 11th to 16th Century (1854–1868) (Dictionnaire raisonné de l'architecture française du XIe au XVIe siècle) – Original (in French) language edition, including numerous illustrations.
- Dictionary of French Furnishings (1858–1870) (Dictionnaire raisonné du mobilier français de l'époque Carolingienne à la Renaissance.)
- Cités et ruines américaines Mitla, Palenqué, Izamal, Chichen-Itza, Uxmal (1863)
- Entretiens sur l'architecture (in 2 volumes, 1863–1872), in which Viollet-le-Duc systematized his approach to architecture and architectural education, in a system radically opposed to that of the École des Beaux-Arts, which he had avoided in his youth and despised. Henry Van Brunt's translation, Discourses on Architecture, was published in 1875, making it available to an American audience little more than a decade after its initial publication in France.
- Histoire de l'habitation humaine, depuis les temps préhistoriques jusqu'à nos jours (1875). Published in English in 1876 as Habitations of Man in All Ages. Viollet-Le-Duc traces the history of domestic architecture among the different "races" of mankind.
- L'art russe: ses origines, ses éléments constructifs, son apogée, son avenir (1877), where Viollet-le-Duc applied his ideas of rational construction to Russian architecture.
- Histoire d'un Dessinateur: Comment on Apprend à Dessiner (1879)

== Architectural theory and new building projects ==
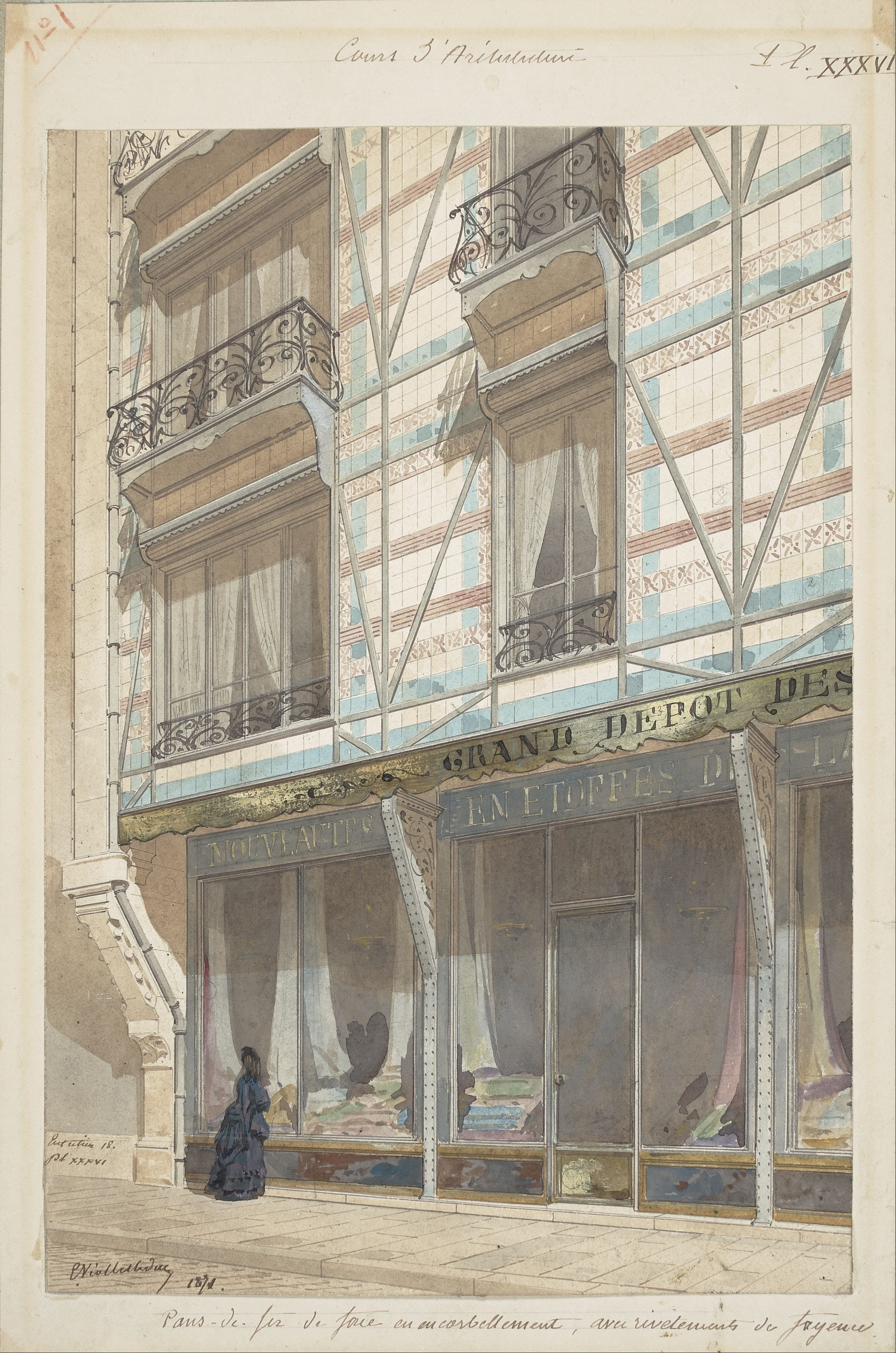
Project for an iron-frame house with glazed earthenware cladding (1871)

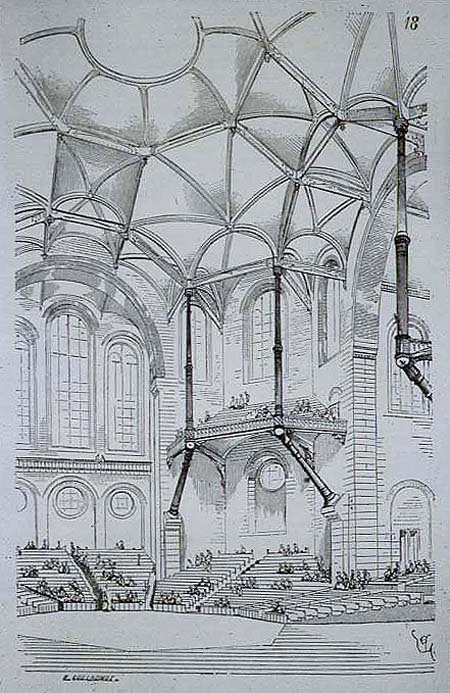
Design for a concert hall, dated 1864, expressing Gothic principles in modern materials; brick, stone and cast iron. Entretiens sur l'architecture

Viollet-le-Duc is considered by many to be the first theorist of modern architecture. Sir John Summerson wrote that "there have been two supremely eminent theorists in the history of European architecture – Leon Battista Alberti and Eugène Viollet-le-Duc."

His architectural theory was largely based on finding the ideal forms for specific materials and using these forms to create buildings. His writings centered on the idea that materials should be used "honestly". He believed that the outward appearance of a building should reflect the rational construction of the building. In Entretiens sur l'architecture, Viollet-le-Duc praised the Greek temple for its rational representation of its construction. For him, "Greek architecture served as a model for the correspondence of structure and appearance."

Another component in Viollet-le-Duc's theory was how the design of a building should start from its program and the plan, and end with its decorations. If this resulted in an asymmetrical exterior, so be it. He dismissed the symmetry of classicist buildings as vain, caring too much about appearances at the expense of practicality and convenience for the inhabitants of the house.

In several unbuilt projects for new buildings, Viollet-le-Duc applied the lessons he had derived from Gothic architecture, applying its rational structural systems to modern building materials such as cast iron. For inspiration, he also examined organic structures, such as leaves and animal skeletons. He was especially interested in the wings of bats, an influence represented by his Assembly Hall project.

Viollet-le-Duc's drawings of iron trusswork were innovative for the time. Many of his designs emphasizing iron would later influence the Art Nouveau movement, most noticeably in the work of Hector Guimard, Victor Horta, Antoni Gaudí and Hendrik Petrus Berlage. His writings inspired several American architects, including Frank Furness, John Wellborn Root, Louis Sullivan, and Frank Lloyd Wright.

== Military career and influence ==
Viollet-le-Duc had a second career in the military, primarily in the defense of Paris during the Franco-Prussian War (1870–71). He was so influenced by the conflict that during his later years he described the idealized defense of France by the analogy of the military history of Le Roche-Pont, an imaginary castle, in his work Histoire d'une Forteresse (Annals of a Fortress, twice translated into English). Accessible and well researched, it is partly fictional.

Annals of a Fortress strongly influenced French military defensive thinking. Viollet-le-Duc's critique of the effect of artillery (applying his practical knowledge from the 1870–1871 war) is so complete that it accurately describes the principles applied to the defense of France until World War II. The physical results of his theories are present in the fortification of Verdun prior to World War I and the Maginot Line prior to World War II. His theories are also represented by the French military theory of "Deliberate Advance", which stresses that artillery and a strong system of fortresses in the rear of an army are essential.

== Legacy ==
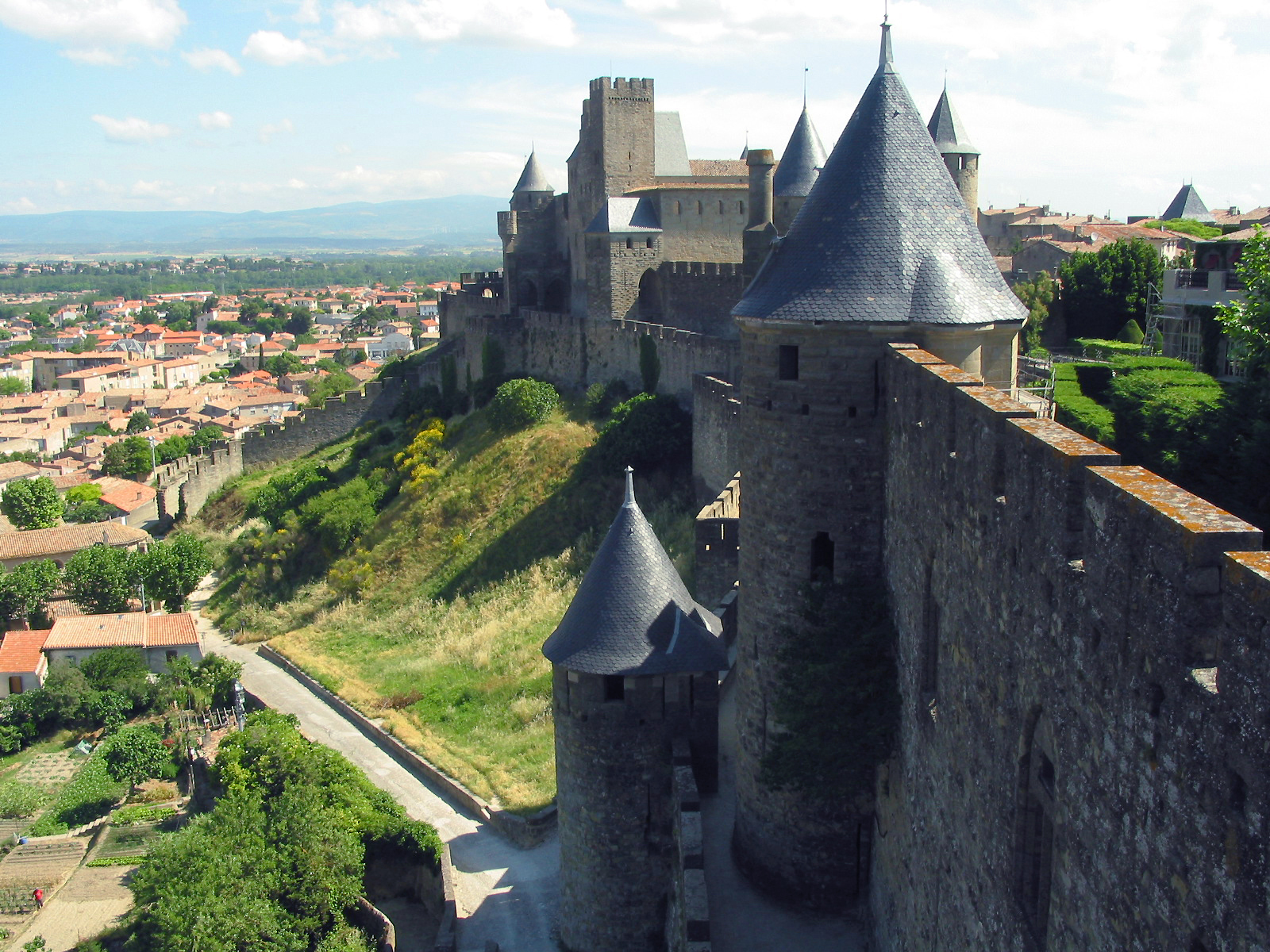
An imported idiom: Viollet-le-Duc's slate-covered conical towers at Carcassonne

The English architect Benjamin Bucknall (1833–1895) was a devotee of Viollet-le-Duc and during 1874 to 1881 translated several of his publications into English to popularise his principles in Great Britain. The later works of the English designer and architect William Burges were greatly influenced by Viollet-le-Duc, most strongly in Burges's designs for his own home, The Tower House in London's Holland Park district, and Burges's designs for Castell Coch near Cardiff, Wales.

An exhibition, Eugène Viollet-le-Duc 1814–1879 was presented in Paris in 1965, and a larger, centennial exhibition took place in 1980.

Viollet-le-Duc was the subject of a Google Doodle on January 27, 2014.

From January 28 – May 24, 2026, the Bard Graduate Center exhibited Viollet-le-Duc Drawing Worlds. The exhibit examined Viollet-le-Duc as a "visionary architect, designer, and theorist who redefined the Gothic past for a modern age." The catalog was edited by Barry Bergdoll and Martin Bressani (ISBN 978-0-300-28448-5). David A. Bell reviewed the exhibition in the New York Review of Books.

== See also ==
- Abbatial church of Notre-Dame de Mouzon

== Bibliography ==
- Bergdoll, Barry and Martin Bressani (2026). Viollet-le-Duc Drawing Worlds. New York: Bard Graduate Center. (ISBN 978-0-300-28448-5).
- Chapman, Anthony (2007), "The gatehouse of Pevensey Castle", Sussex Archaeological Collections, 145: 97–118, doi:10.5284/1086050
- Grodecki, Louis (1999). Dictionnaire des Architectes (in French). Encyclopedia Universalis. ISBN 2-226-10952-8.
- Khan, Yasmin Sabina (2010). Enlightening the World: The Creation of the Statue of Liberty. Ithaca, New York: Cornell University Press. ISBN 978-0-8014-4851-5.
- Poisson, Georges; Poisson, Olivier (2014). Eugène Viollet-le-Duc (in French). Paris: Picard. ISBN 978-2-7084-0952-1.
