= Affray =

Public fight that disturbs the peace

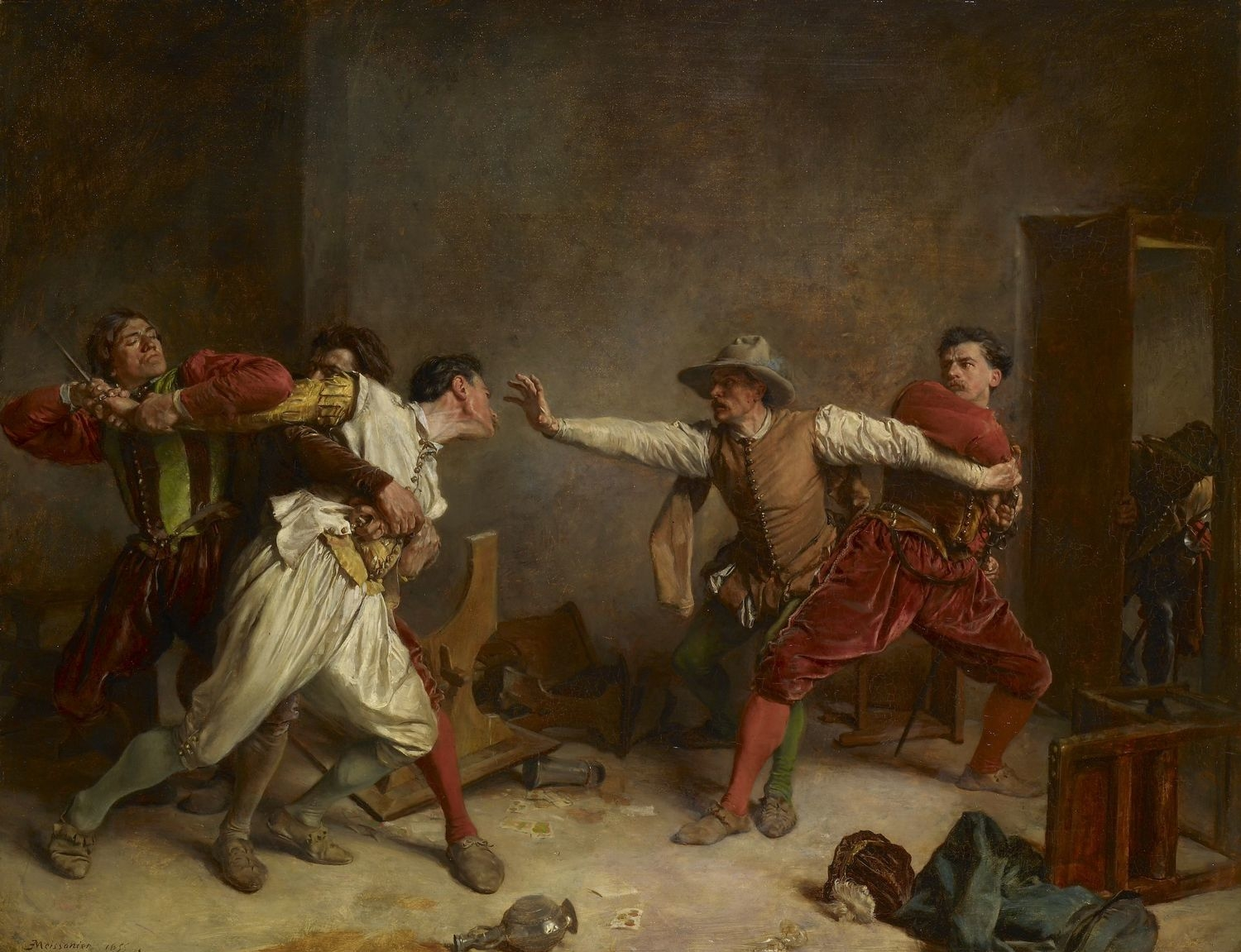
The Brawl by Ernest Meissonier, 1855

In many legal jurisdictions related to English common law, affray is a public order offence consisting of the fighting of one or more persons in a public place to the terror (in French: à l'effroi) of ordinary people. Depending on their actions, and the laws of the prevailing jurisdiction, those engaged in an affray may also render themselves liable to prosecution for assault, unlawful assembly, or riot; if so, it is for one of these offences that they are usually charged.

== Australia ==
In New South Wales, section 93C of Crimes Act 1900 defines that a person will be guilty of affray if he or she threatens unlawful violence towards another and his or her conduct is such as would cause a person of reasonable firmness present at the scene to fear for his or her personal safety. A person will only be guilty of affray if the person intends to use or threaten violence or is aware that his or her conduct may be violent or threaten violence. The maximum penalty for an offence of affray contrary to section 93C is a period of imprisonment of 10 years.

In Queensland, section 72 of the Criminal Code of 1899 defines affray as taking part in a fight in a public highway or taking part in a fight of such a nature as to alarm the public in any other place to which the public have access. This definition is taken from that in the English Criminal Code Bill of 1880, cl. 96. Section 72 says "Any person who takes part in a fight in a public place, or takes part in a fight of such a nature as to alarm the public in any other place to which the public have access, commits a misdemeanour. Maximum penalty—1 year’s imprisonment."

In Victoria, Affray was a common law offence until 2017, when it was abolished and was replaced with the statutory offence that can be found under section 195H of the Crimes Act 1958 (Vic). The section defines Affray as the use or threat of unlawful violence by a person in a manner that would cause a person of reasonable firmness present at the scene to be terrified. However, a person who commits this conduct may only be found guilty of Affray if the use or threat of violence was intended, or if the person was reckless as to whether the conduct involves the use or threat of violence. If found guilty, the maximum penalty that may be imposed for Affray is imprisonment for 5 years or, if at the time of committing the offence the person was wearing a face covering used primarily to conceal their identity or to protect them from the effects of crowd-controlling substances, imprisonment for 7 years.

== India ==
The Indian Penal Code (sect. 159) adopts the old English common law definition of affray, with the substitution of "actual disturbance of the peace for causing terror to the lieges".

== New Zealand ==
In New Zealand affray has been codified as "fighting in a public place" by section 7 of the Summary Offences Act 1981.

== South Africa ==
Under the Roman-Dutch law in force in South Africa affray falls within the definition of vis publica.

== United Kingdom ==
=== England and Wales ===
The common law offence of affray was abolished for England and Wales on 1 April 1987. Affray is now a statutory offence that is triable either way. It is created by section 3 of the Public Order Act 1986 which provides:

- (1) A person is guilty of affray if he uses or threatens unlawful violence towards another and his conduct is such as would cause a person of reasonable firmness present at the scene to fear for his personal safety.
- (2) Where 2 or more persons use or threaten the unlawful violence, it is the conduct of them taken together that must be considered for the purposes of subsection (1).
- (3) For the purposes of this section a threat cannot be made by the use of words alone.
- (4) No person of reasonable firmness need actually be, or be likely to be, present at the scene.
- (5) Affray may be committed in private as well as in public places.
- (6) ... [Repealed]
- (7) A person guilty of affray is liable on conviction on indictment to imprisonment for a term not exceeding 3 years or a fine or both, or on summary conviction to imprisonment for a term not exceeding 6 months or a fine not exceeding the statutory maximum or both.

The term "violence" is defined by section 8.

Section 3(6) once provided that a constable could arrest without warrant anyone he reasonably suspected to be committing affray, but that subsection was repealed by paragraph 26(2) of Schedule 7 to, and Schedule 17 to, the Serious Organised Crime and Police Act 2005, which includes more general provisions for police to make arrests without warrant.

The mens rea of affray is that person is guilty of affray only if he intends to use or threaten violence or is aware that his conduct may be violent or threaten violence.

The offence of affray has been used by HM Government to address the problem of drunken or violent individuals who cause serious trouble on airliners.

In R v Childs & Price (2015), the Court of Appeal quashed a murder verdict and replaced it with affray, having dismissed an allegation of common purpose.

=== Northern Ireland ===
Affray is a serious offence for the purposes of Chapter 3 of the Criminal Justice (Northern Ireland) Order 2008.

== United States ==
In the United States, the English common law as to affray applies in states which recognize common law offences, subject to certain modifications by the statutes of particular states.

== See also ==
- Assault
- Battery
- Combat
