= Opéra de Lyon =

- Facade of the Opéra Nouvel
- Interactive map of the Opéra de Lyon area

General information
- Type: Opera
- Location: Place de la Comédie, Lyon, France
- Coordinates: 45°46′04.18″N 4°50′11.80″E
- Current tenants: National Opera of Lyon
- Inaugurated: 1831 and 1993

Design and construction
- Architects: Antoine-Marie Chenavard and Jean-Marie Pollet, then Jean Nouvel

Other information
- Seating capacity: 1,100

Website
- www.opera-lyon.com

The Opéra de Lyon (also known as Opéra Nouvel, formerly Grand Théâtre) in Lyon, France, is the home of the Opéra National de Lyon. The original opera house was re-designed by the distinguished French architect, Jean Nouvel between 1985 and 1993 in association with the agency of scenography dUCKS scéno and the acoustician Peutz. Serge Dorny was appointed general director in 2003.

== History ==
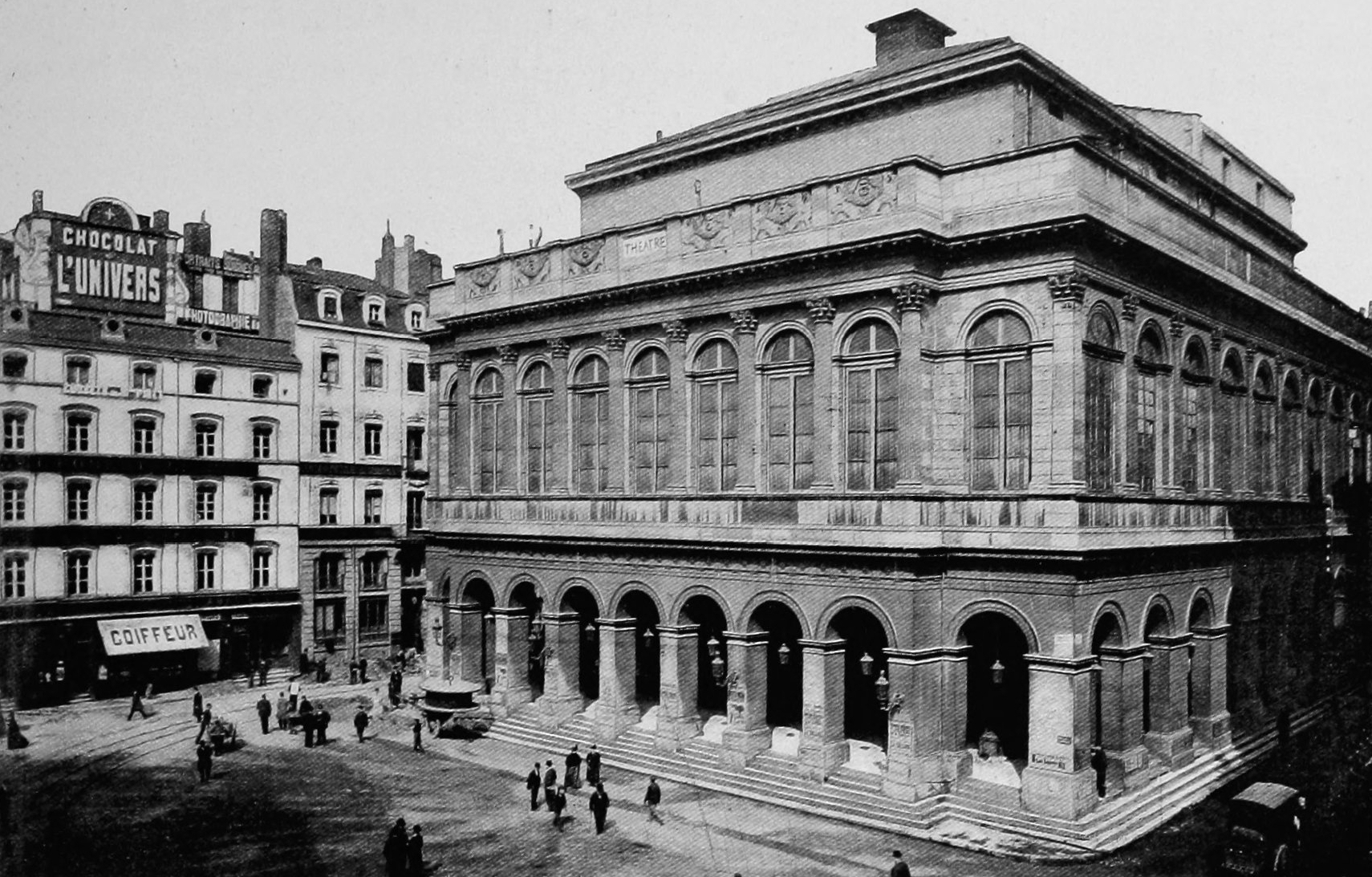
The old opera house at the beginning of the 20th century

In 1756, one of the first opera houses created inside an existing freestanding building was opened in Lyon. It was designed by Jacques-Germain Soufflot, the architect of the Panthéon in Paris, and known as the Grand Théâtre. By early in the following century it was found to be too small, and Antoine-Marie Chenavard and Jean-Marie Pollet erected the new Opéra de Lyon which opened on July 1, 1831. It was considered rather undistinguished, but served its purpose.

It was not until 1985 that the City decided to once again re-build the opera house, but this time it was to be within the shell of the existing 1831 building. One of France's most distinguished architects was commissioned to create the house.

The style of the house is essentially Italian with a horseshoe-shaped auditorium and tiers of boxes.

Leaving only the existing foyer and the exterior façade, Nouvel tripled the space within the house by excavating below ground to create rehearsal space and, most strikingly, by doubling the height of the building by creating a steel and glass barrel vault which hid the fly tower as well as providing space for the ballet company. It has been noted that this achievement was "an architectural tour de force, in which the past has been successfully wedded to the future..", albeit with the limited backstage space of the 19th-century theatre still remaining.

== Main conductors ==
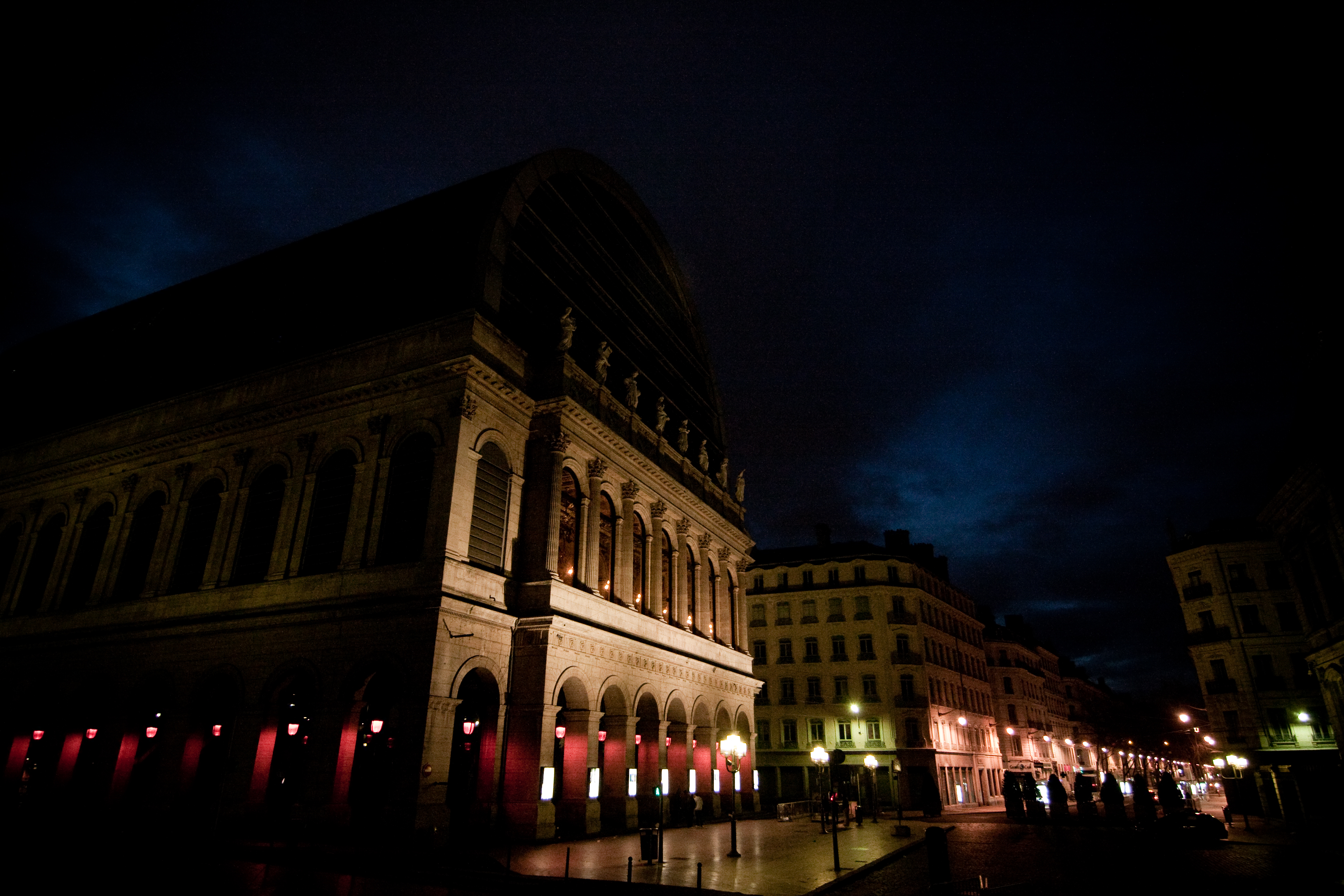
The opera at night

- John Eliot Gardiner (1983–1988)
- Kent Nagano (1988–1998)
- Louis Langrée (1998–2000)
- Ivan Fischer (2000–2003)
- William Christie, Lothar Koenigs, Gerard Korsten, Emmanuel Krivine, Kirill Petrenko, Evelino Pidò (2003–2008)
- Kazushi Ono (2008–2017)
- Daniele Rustioni (2017–present)

== See also ==
- List of theatres and entertainment venues in Lyon
