= Brawl =

Brawl or Brawling may refer to:

- Brawl, a large-scale fist fight usually involving multiple participants
- Strathy, a crofting community on the north coast of Scotland
- Brawling (legal definition), a rowdy argument on church property
- Bench-clearing brawl, a large-scale fight occurring during a game or match
- Brawl (band), an American hard rock band that was later renamed Disturbed
- Brawl (game), a real-time card game
- Brawl, a Transformers character
- Super Smash Bros. Brawl, a 2008 Nintendo Wii platform fighting game
- Branle, a French dance style, pronounced "Brawl"
- The Brawl, an 1855 painting by Ernest Meissonier

== See also ==
- Brawler (disambiguation)
