= Soldier Playing the Theorbo =

Painting by Ernest Meissonier

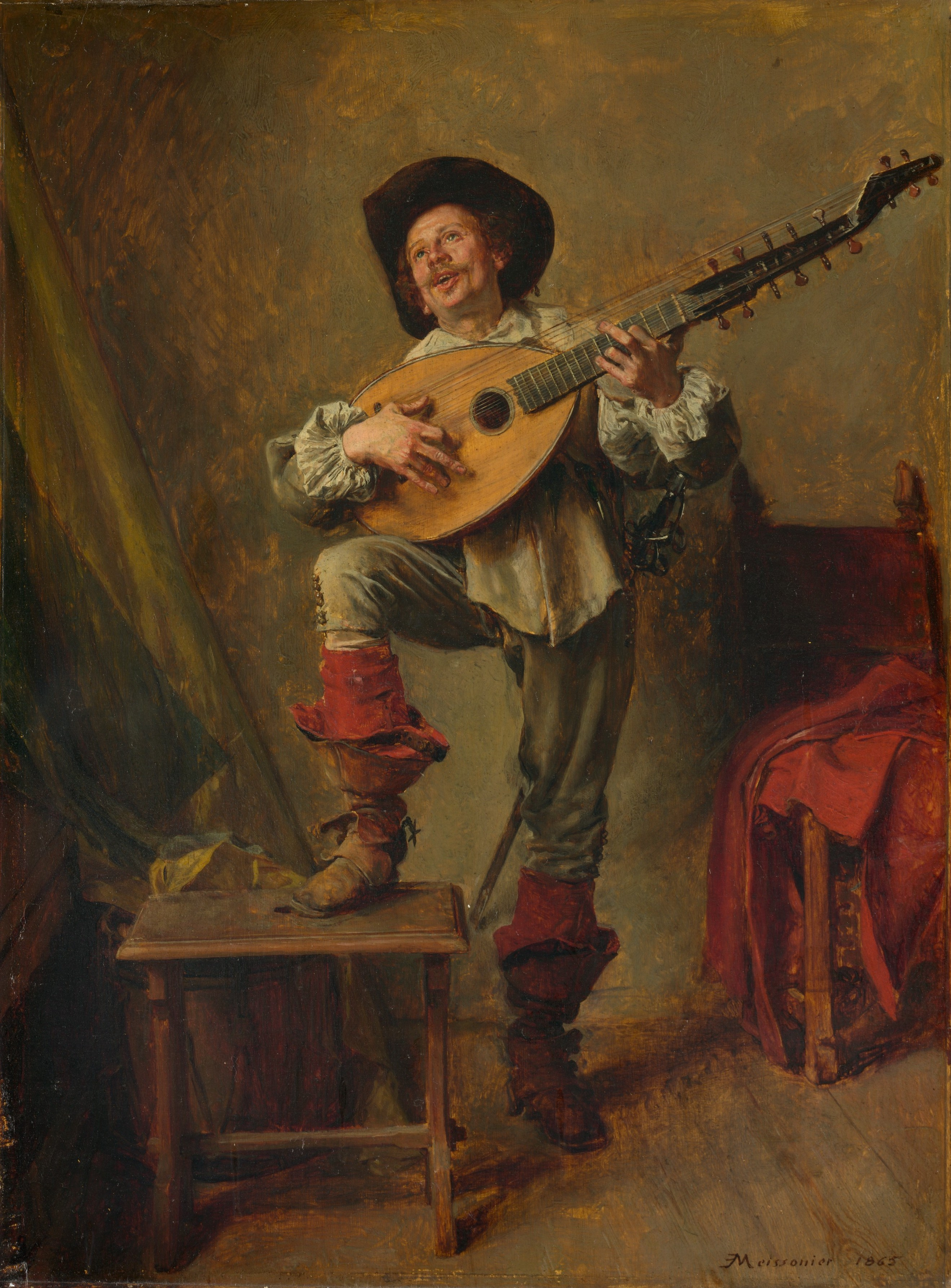
- Artist: Ernest Meissonier
- Year: 1865
- Medium: Oil on canvas
- Dimensions: 29.2 cm × 21.9 cm (11.5 in × 8.6 in)
- Location: Metropolitan Museum of Art; New York

Soldier Playing the Theorbo is an oil on canvas painting by French artist Ernest Meissonier, created in 1865. The painting depicts a soldier playing a theorbo. The painting is in the collection of the Metropolitan Museum of Art, in New York.

== Description ==
The painting's central figure is a jovial soldier playing a theorbo, a stringed instrument popular during the heyday of Baroque music in the 17th century. Similarly, the soldier's garb is that of an infantryman during the Eighty Years War, which was waged during the same period; this distinct style is intended to evoke memories of the works of the famous Dutch masters of the 17th century, and to capitalize on the wildly-popular works of Alexandre Dumas, which also concerned the same time period. Meissonier's use of 17th century soldiery in his paintings was not unique to Soldier, as he also included similar figures in his 1863 painting The Card Players. Meissonier is noted for painstakingly researching and accurately depicting the clothing such a soldier would have worn.

The painting was produced for Baron Auguste Goethals, a general in the service of the Kingdom of Belgium. It was originally planned for the painting to be titled The Lute Player. The painting was granted to the Metropolitan Museum of Art in 1908 as part of a bequest.
