= Ernest Meissonier =

French painter (1815–1891)

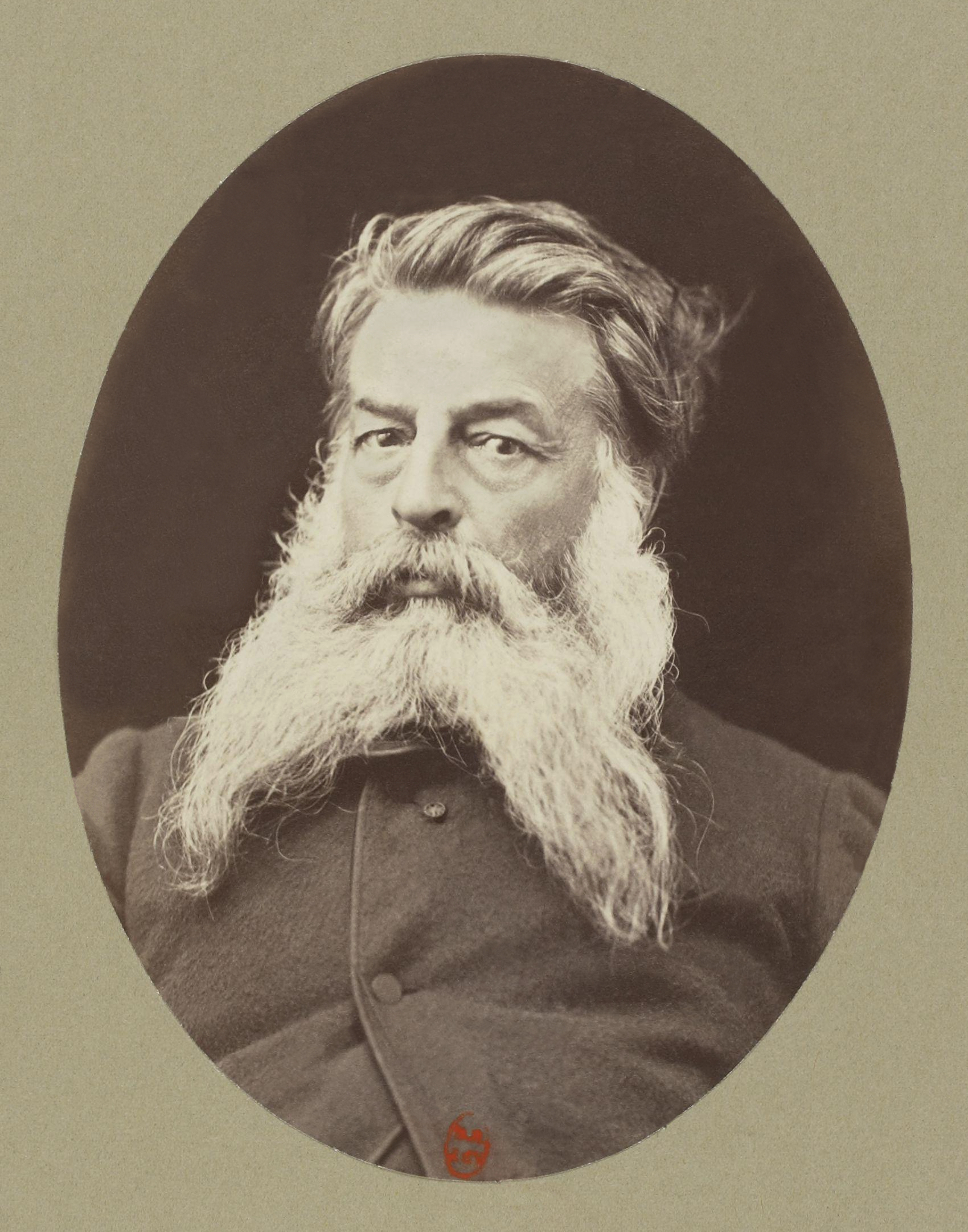
- Ernest Meissonier
- Born: Jean-Louis-Ernest Meissonier; 21 February 1815; Lyon, France
- Died: 31 January 1891 (aged 75); Paris, France
- Known for: Painting, sculpture
- Movement: Romanticism, Academic art
- Spouse: Emma Steinhel

Jean-Louis-Ernest Meissonier (French: [ʒɑ̃ lwi ɛʁnɛst mɛsɔnje]; 21 February 1815 – 31 January 1891) was a French academic painter and sculptor. He became famous for his depictions of Napoleon and his military sieges and manoeuvres in paintings acclaimed both for the artist's mastery of fine detail and his assiduous craftsmanship. The English art critic John Ruskin examined his work at length under a magnifying glass, "marvelling at Meissonier's manual dexterity and eye for fascinating minutiae." Meissonier enjoyed great success in his lifetime, becoming, with Gérôme and Cabanel, one of "the three most successful artists of the Second Empire."

Meissonier's work commanded enormous prices and in 1846 he purchased a great mansion in Poissy, sometimes known as the Grande Maison. The Grande Maison included two large studios, the atelier d'hiver, or winter workshop, situated on the top floor of the house, and at ground level, a glass-roofed annexe, the atelier d'été or summer workshop. Meissonier himself said that his house and temperament belonged to another age, and some, like the critic Paul Mantz for example, criticised the artist's seemingly limited repertoire. Like Alexandre Dumas, he excelled at depicting scenes of chivalry and masculine adventure against a backdrop of pre-Revolutionary and pre-industrial France, specialising in scenes from seventeenth- and eighteenth-century life.

== Biography ==
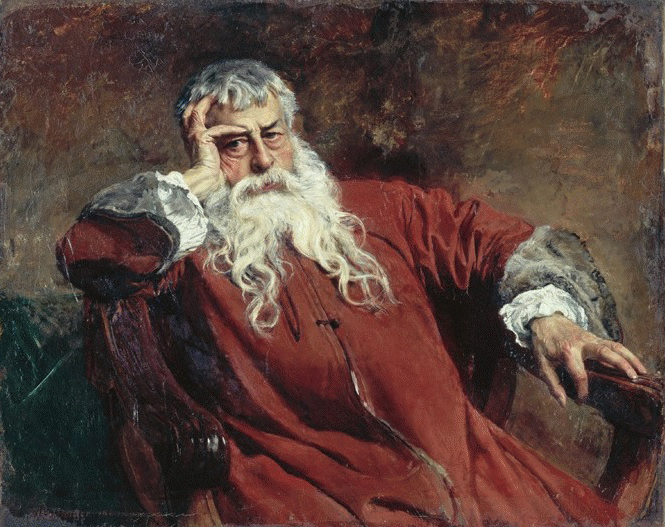
Ernest Meissonier, Self-portrait, 1889

Ernest Meissonier was born in Lyon. His father, Charles, had been a successful businessman, the proprietor of a factory in Saint-Denis, north of Paris, that made dyes for the textile industry. He expected Ernest, the eldest of his two sons, to follow him into the dye business. Yet from his schooldays Ernest showed a taste for painting, to which some early sketches, dated 1823, bear witness. After being placed with a druggist in the Rue des Lombards, at age seventeen, he obtained leave from his parents to become an artist. Following the recommendation of a painter named Potier, himself a second class Prix de Rome, he was admitted to Léon Cogniet's studio. He also formed his style after the Dutch masters as represented in the Louvre.

He paid short visits to Rome and to Switzerland, and exhibited in the Salon of 1831 a painting then called Les Bourgeois Flamands (Dutch Burghers), but also known as The Visit to the Burgomaster, subsequently purchased by Sir Richard Wallace, in whose collection (at Hertford House, London) it is, with fifteen other examples of this painter. It was the first attempt in France in the particular genre which was destined to make Meissonier famous: microscopic painting miniature in oils. Working hard for daily bread at illustrations for the publishers Curmer, Hetzel and Dubocherhe, Meissonier also exhibited at the Salon of 1836 with Chess Player and the Errand Boy.

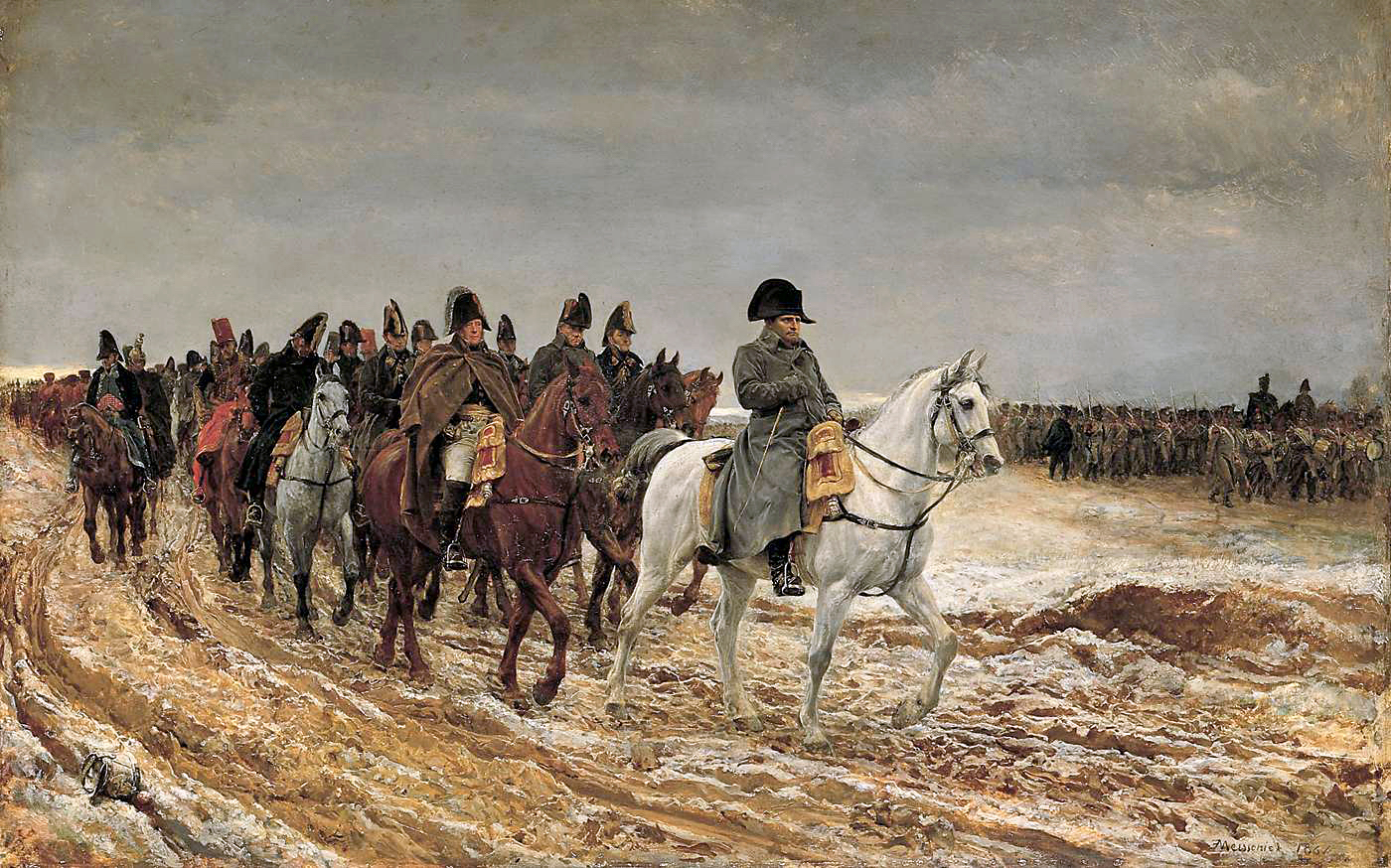
1814. Campagne de France (Napoleon and his staff returning from Soissons after the Battle of Laon), 1864 (Musée d'Orsay)

In 1838 Meissonier married a Protestant woman from Strasbourg named Emma Steinhel, the sister of M. Steinheil, one of his artistic companions. Two children were born in due course; Thérèse (1840), and Charles. On the birth registration of his daughter he described himself as a "painter of history".

After some not very happy attempts at religious painting, he returned, under the influence of Antoine-Marie Chenavard, to the class of work he was born to excel in, and exhibited with much success the Game of Chess (1841), the Young Man playing the 'Cello (1842), Painter in his Studio (1843), The Guard Room, the Young Man looking at Drawings, the Game of Piquet (1845), and the Game of Bowls, works which show the finish and certainty of his technique, and assured his success.

Meissonier became known as the French Metsu, a reference to the seventeenth-century Dutch painter Gabriel Metsu, who specialised in miniature scenes of bourgeois domestic life; "grandiose history paintings did not sell as readily as smaller canvases such as landscapes or portraits, which fitted more easily onto the walls of Paris apartments". He specialised in scenes from seventeenth- and eighteenth-century life, portraying his bonshommes, or goodfellows - playing chess, smoking pipes, reading books, sitting before easels or double basses, or posing in the uniforms of musketeers or halberdiers [-] all executed in microscopic detail. Typical examples include Halt at an Inn, owned by the Duc de Morny and The Brawl, which was owned by Queen Victoria.

After his Soldiers (1848) he began A Day in June, which was never finished, and exhibited A Smoker (1849) and Bravos (Les Bravi, 1852). In 1855 he touched the highest mark of his achievement with The Gamblers and The Quarrel (La Rixe), which was presented by Napoleon III to the English Court. His triumph was sustained at the Salon of 1857, when he exhibited nine pictures, and drawings; among them the Young Man of the Time of the Regency, The Painter, The Shoeing Smith, The Musician, and A Reading at Diderot's. When, in the summer of 1859, Emperor Napoleon III, together with Victor Emmanuel II King of Piedmont and Sardinia, tried to oust the Habsburgs from their territories in northern Italy, Meissonier received a government commission to illustrate scenes from the campaign. The Emperor Napoleon III at Solferino took Meissonier more than three years to complete. The work, a battle scene, represented something of a departure for the painter of bonshommes and musketeers though Meissonier had already painted scenes of violence and massacre, such as Remembrance of Civil War, and in 1848 had indeed seen active service as a captain in the National Guard, when he fought on the side of the republican government during the June Days. In autumn 1861 he was elected to a chair in the Institut de France when the members of the Académie des Beaux-Arts voted for him to join their number. To the Salon of 1861 he sent A Shoeing Smith, A Musician, A Painter, and M. Louis Fould; to that of 1864 The Emperor at Solferino, and 1814. He subsequently exhibited A Gamblers' Quarrel (1865) and Desaix and the Army of the Rhine (1867).

In June 1868 Meissonier travelled to Antibes with canvas and easel, together with his wife, son and daughter, and two of his horses, Bachelier and Lady Coningham. He may have been attracted there for historical reasons—in 1794 Napoleon had been imprisoned in Fort Carré, and in 1815, returning from exile on Elba in 1815 he had come ashore at Golfe-Jouan—and the island of Sainte-Marguerite where the Man in the Iron Mask was imprisoned 1686–1698, was a little out to sea.

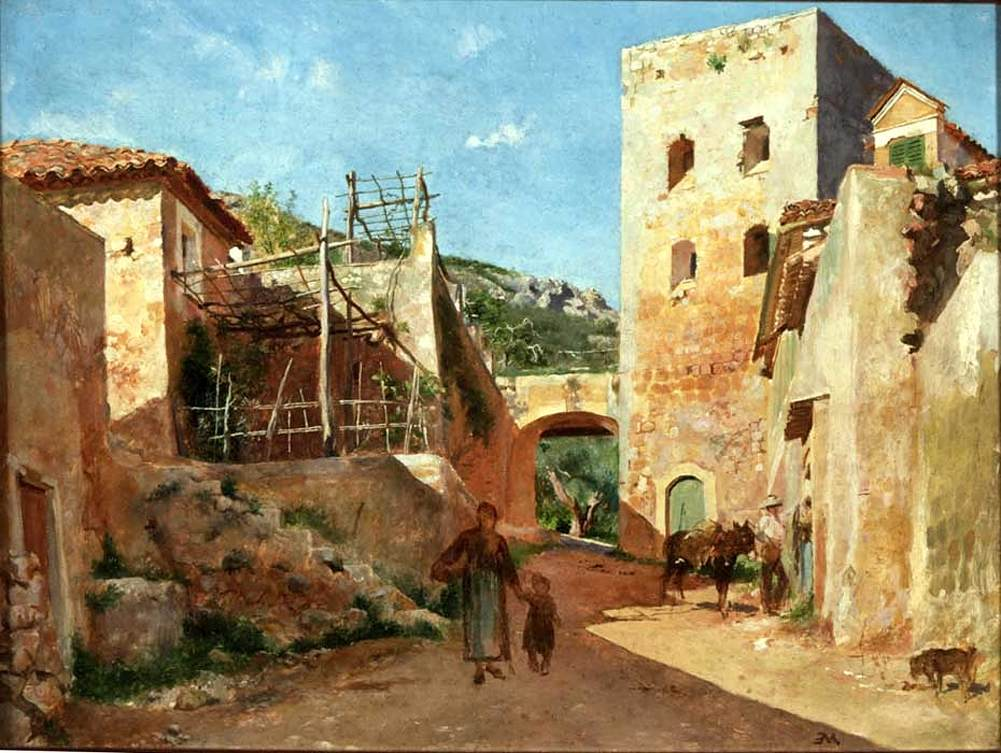
In June 1868 Meissonier arrived in Antibes - "It is delightful to sun oneself in the brilliant light of the South," he wrote

The light of the south attracted Meissonnier. "It is delightful to sun oneself in the brilliant light of the South instead of wandering about like gnomes in the fog. The view at Antibes is one of the fairest sights in nature." And it is possible that the influence of plein-air landscapists had encouraged Meissonier to abandon for a while his obsession with historical authenticity in favour of something more spontaneous: "of creating eye-catching visual effects by means of a few salient touches of the brush. If these Antibes landscapes never matched [-] the work of Pissarro, they nonetheless revealed Meissonier as a painter of remarkable versatility whose ambitions were not entirely at odds with those of the École des Batignolles."

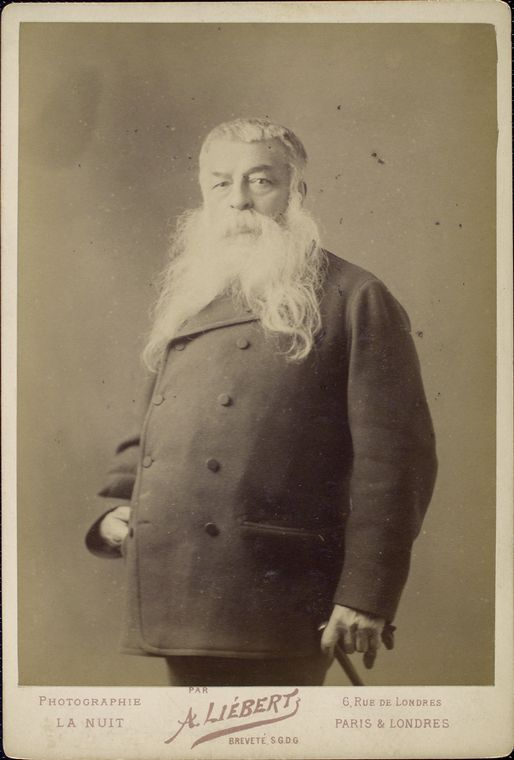
Ernest Meissonnier

Meissonier worked with elaborate care and a scrupulous observation of nature. Some of his works, as for instance his 1807, remained ten years in course of execution. To the great Exhibition of 1878 he contributed sixteen pictures: the portrait of Alexandre Dumas fils which had been seen at the Salon of 1877, Cuirassiers of 1805, A Venetian Painter, Moreau and his Staff before Hohenlinden, a Portrait of a Lady, the Road to La Salice, The Two Friends, The Outpost of the Grand Guard, A Scout, and Dictating his Memoirs. Thenceforward he exhibited less in the Salons, and sent his work to smaller exhibitions. Being chosen president of the Great National Exhibition in 1883, he was represented there by such works as The Pioneer, The Army of the Rhine, The Arrival of the Guests, and Saint Mark.

On 24 May 1884 an exhibition was opened at the Petit Gallery of Meissonier's collected works, including 146 examples. As president of the jury on painting at the Exhibition of 1889 he contributed some new pictures. In the following year the New Salon was formed (the Société Nationale des Beaux-Arts), and Meissonier became its president. He exhibited there in 1890 his painting 1807; and in 1891, shortly after his death, his Barricade was displayed there.

A less well-known class of work than his painting is a series of etchings: The Last Supper, The Skill of Vuillaume the Lute Player, The Little Smoker, The Old Smoker, the Preparations for a Duel, Anglers, Troopers, The Reporting Sergeant, and Polichinelle, in the Hertford House collection. He also tried lithography, but the prints are now scarcely to be found. Of all the painters of the century, Meissonier was one of the most fortunate in the matter of payments. His Cuirassiers, now in the late duc d'Aumale's collection at Chantilly, was bought from the artist for £10,000, sold at Brussels for £11,000, and then resold for £16,000.

Besides his genre portraits, he painted some others: those of Doctor Lefevre, of Chenavard, of Vanderbilt, of Doctor Guyon, and of Stanford. He also collaborated with the painter Français in a picture of The Park at St Cloud.

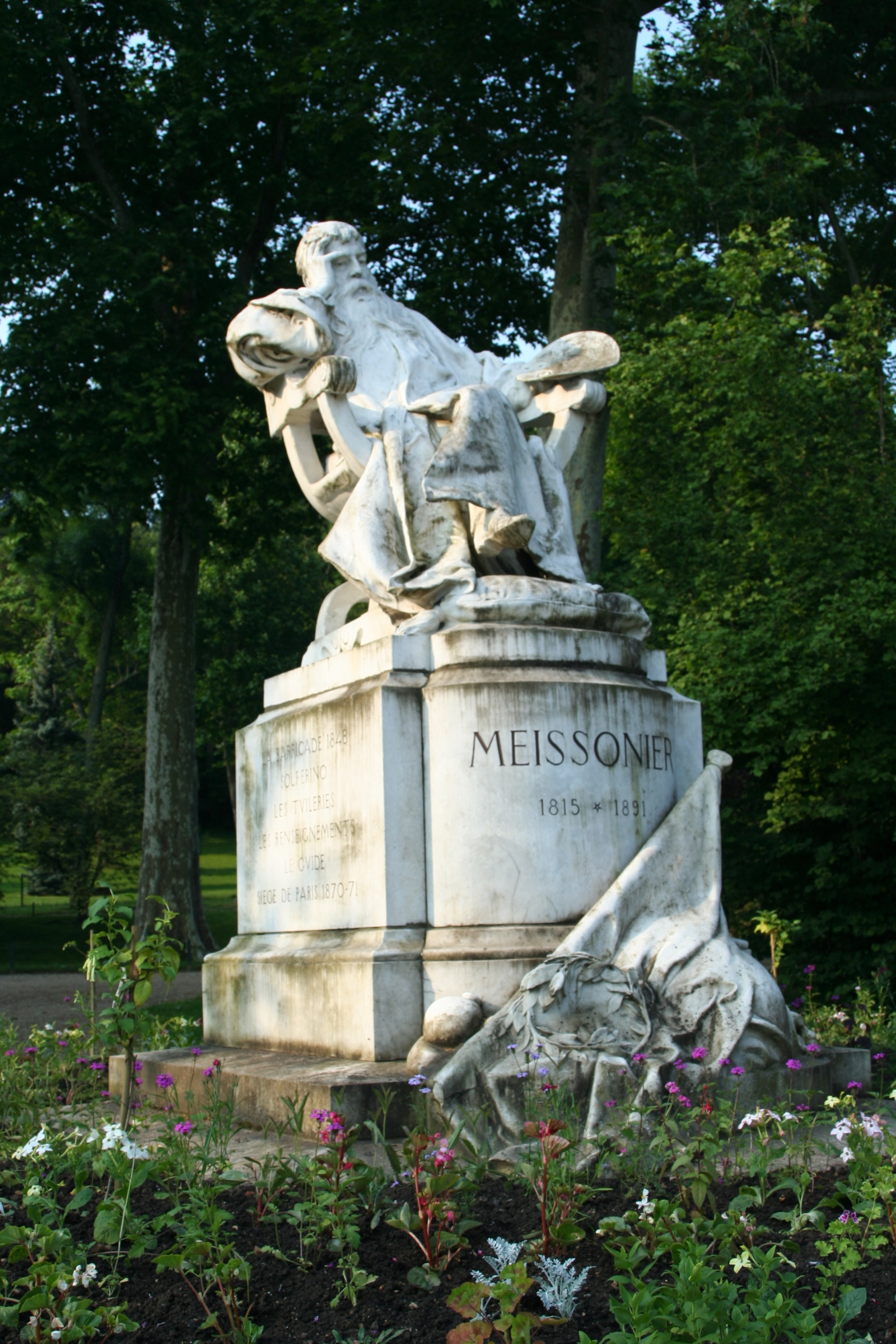
Statue of Meissonier at Parc Meissonier in Poissy (Yvelines), France

Meissonier was attached by Napoleon III to the imperial staff, and accompanied him during the campaign in Italy at the beginning of the war in 1870. During the Siege of Paris (1870–1871) he was colonel of a regiment de marche, one of the improvised units thrown up in the chaos of the Franco-Prussian War. In 1840 he was awarded a third-class medal, a second-class medal in 1841, first-class medals in 1843 and 1844 and medals of honour at the great exhibitions. In 1846 he was appointed knight of the Légion d'honneur and promoted to the higher grades in 1856, 1867 (June 29), and 1880 (July 12), receiving the Grand Cross in 1889 (October 29).

He nevertheless cherished certain ambitions which remained unfulfilled. He hoped to become a professor at the École des Beaux-Arts, but the appointment he desired was never given to him. He also aspired to be chosen deputy or made senator, but he was not elected. In 1861 he succeeded Abel de Pujol as member of the Academy of Fine Arts. On the occasion of the centenary festival in honour of Michelangelo in 1875 he was the delegate of the Institute of France to Florence, and spoke as its representative. Meissonier was an admirable draughtsman upon wood, his illustrations to Les Conties Rémois (engraved by Lavoignat), to Lamartine's Fall of an Angel to Paul and Virginia, and to The French Painted by Themselves being among the best known. The leading engravers and etchers of France have been engaged upon plates from the works of Meissonier, and many of these plates command the highest esteem of collectors. Meissonier died in Paris on 31 January 1891.

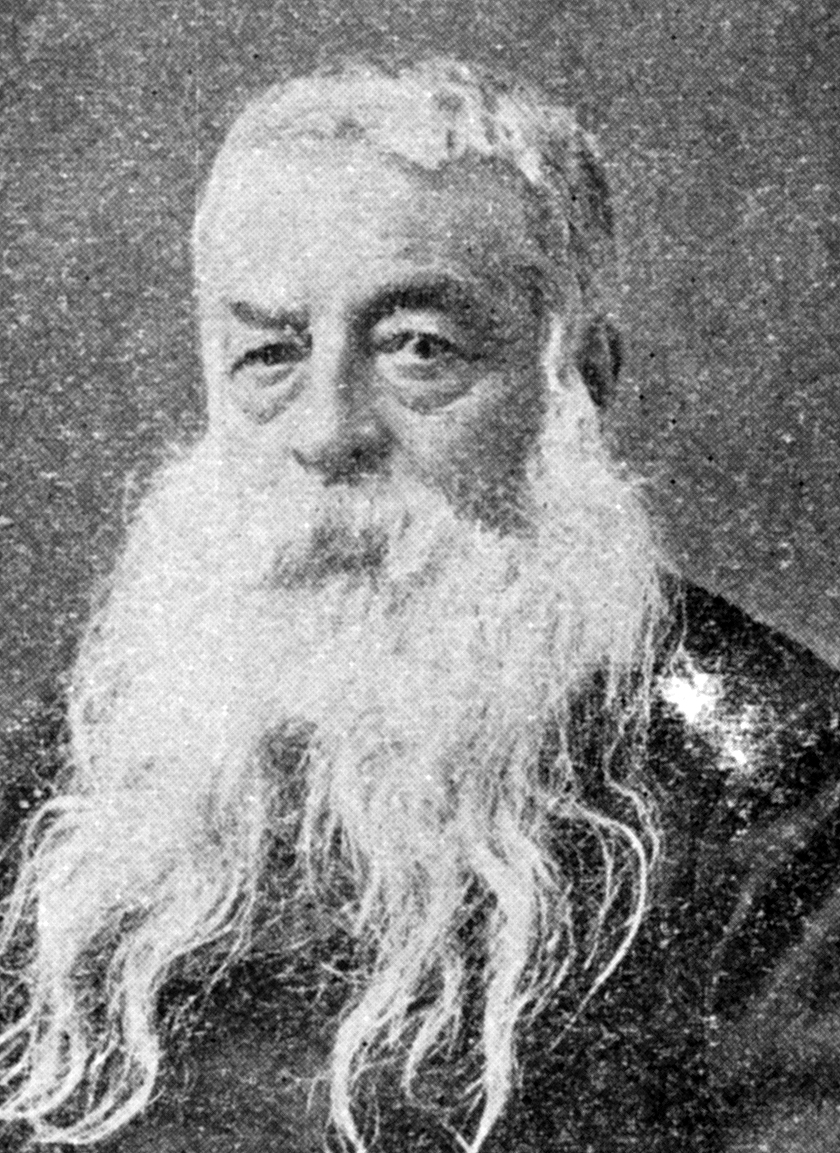
Ernest Meissonier, undated photograph

When the Société Nationale des Beaux-Arts was re-vitalized, in 1890, Ernest Meissonier was elected its first chairman, but he died soon; his successor was Puvis de Chavannes. The vice-president was Auguste Rodin.

His son, Jean Charles Meissonier, also a painter, was his father's pupil, and was admitted to the Légion d'honneur in 1889.

Rue Meissonier, in the 17th Arrondissement in Paris, France, is named after him.

In 2020, Meissonier's painting Joueurs d'échecs was restituted to the heirs of Marguerite Stern, from whom it was looted under the Nazis.

== Gallery ==
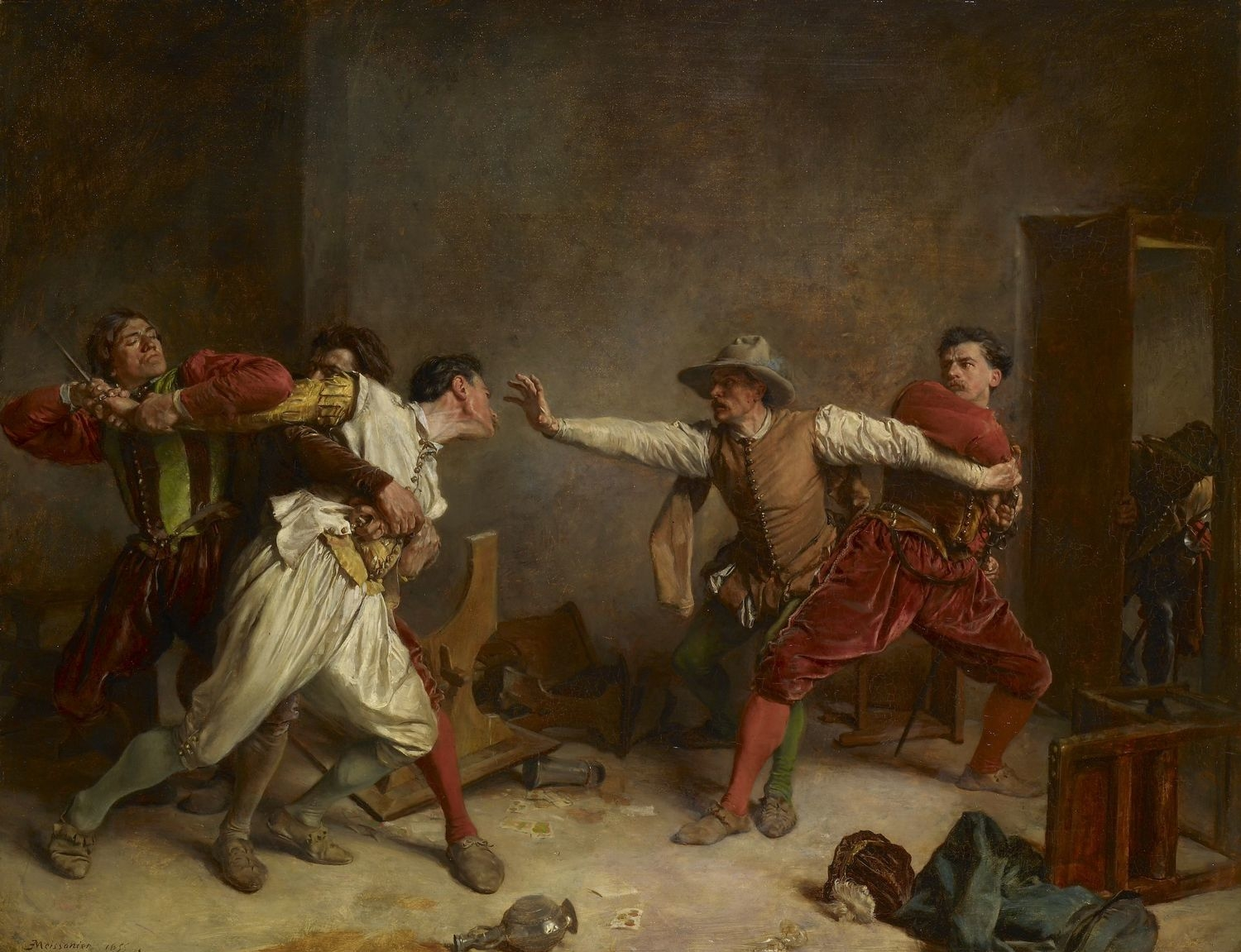
The Brawl, 1855

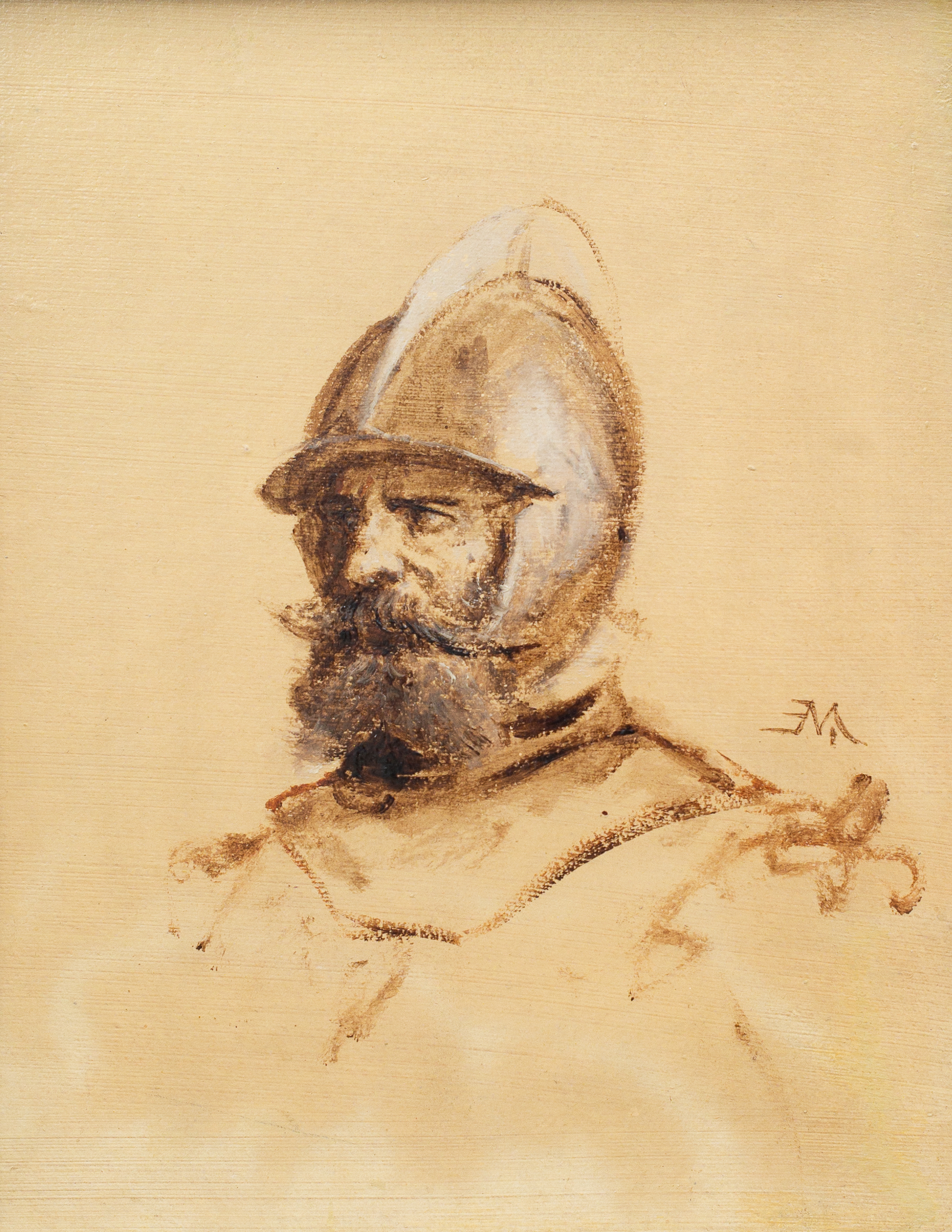
Head of a Soldier, 1860-1870

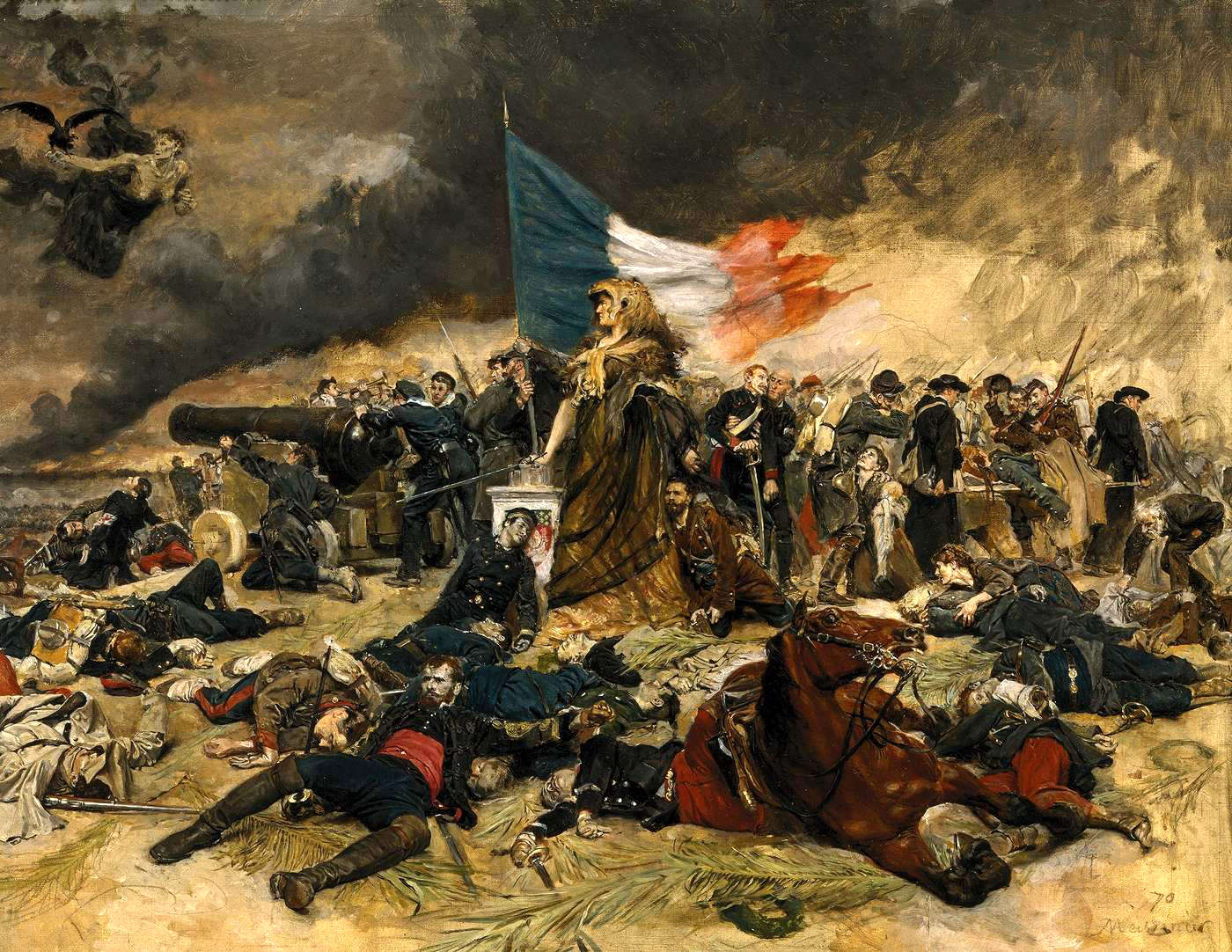
The Siege of Paris, 1884

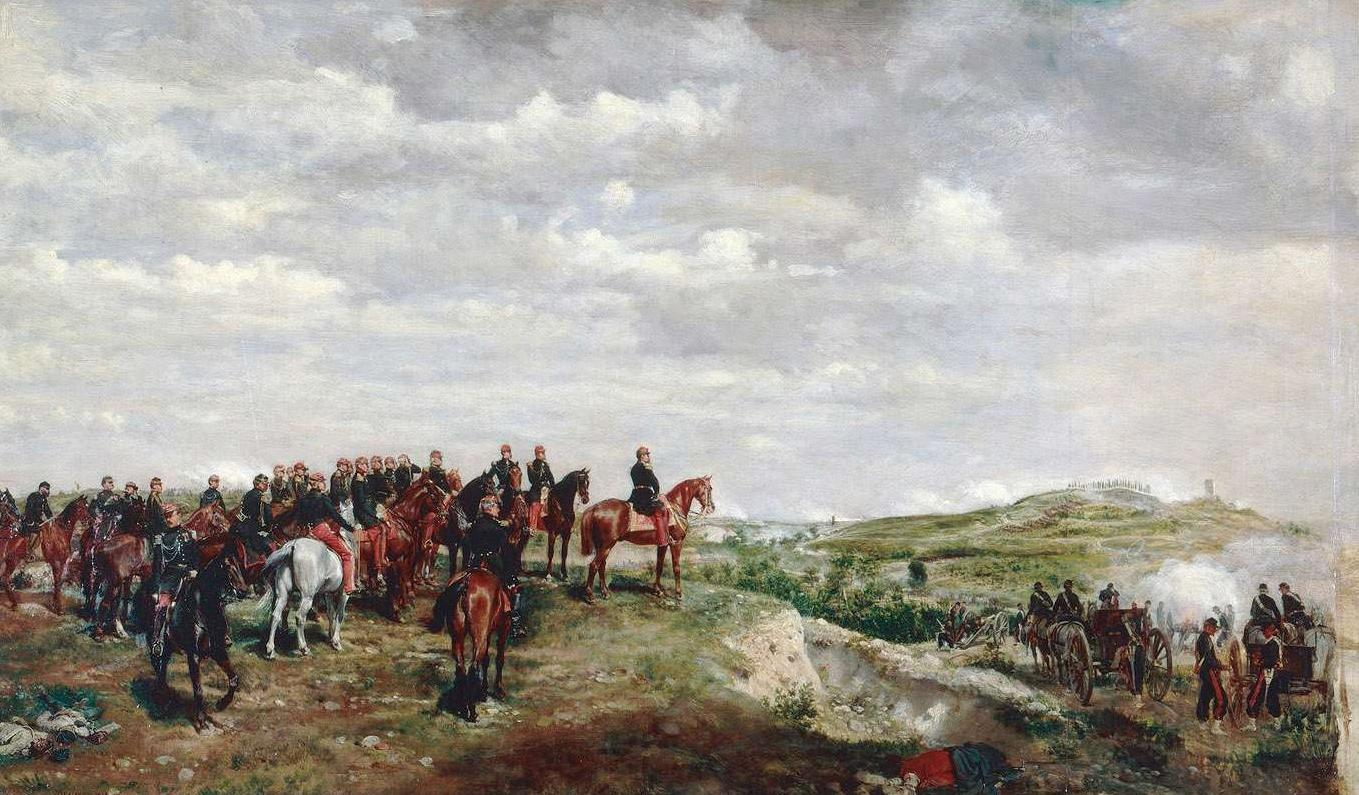
Napoleon III at the Battle of Solferino, 1863

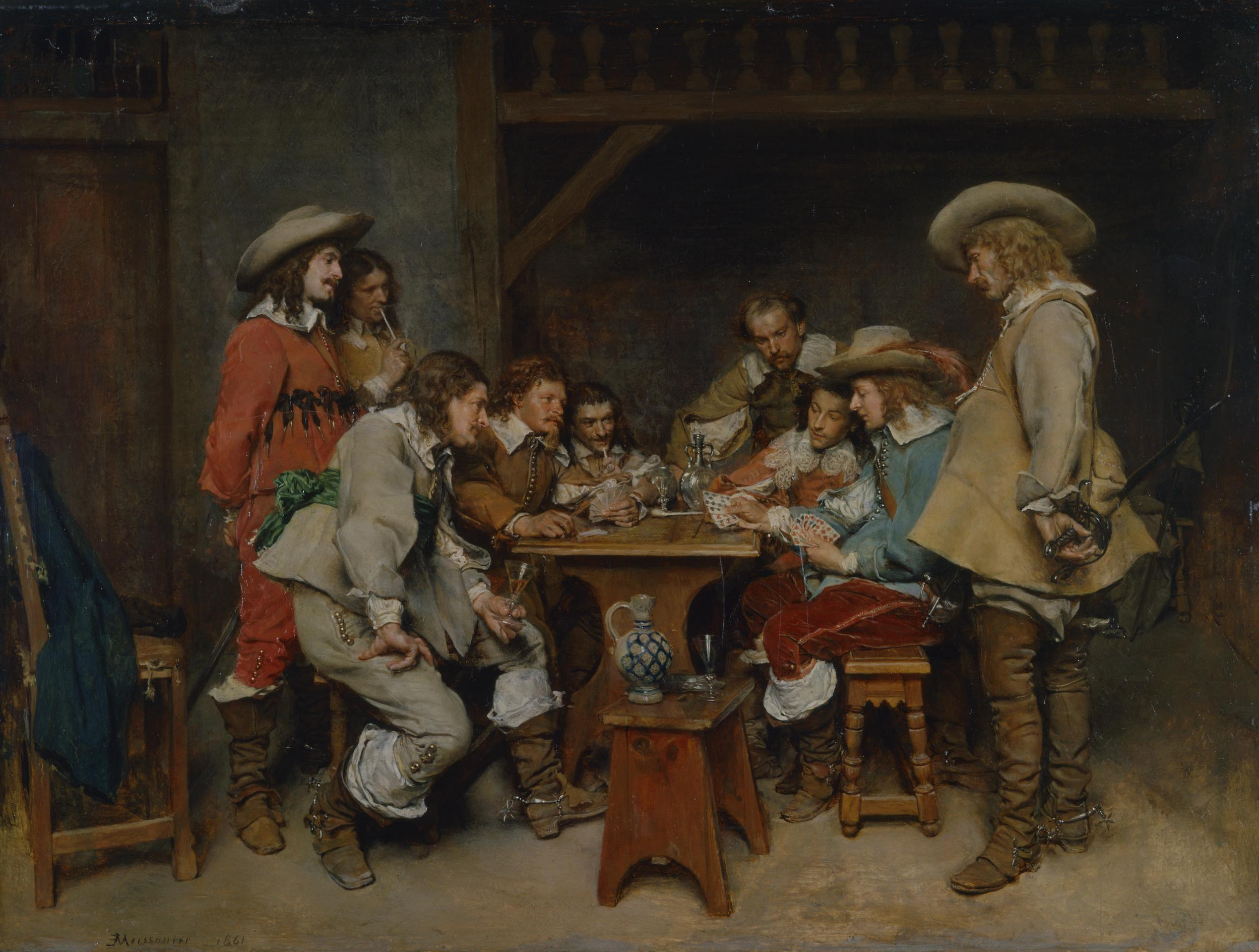
A Game of Piquet,
1861

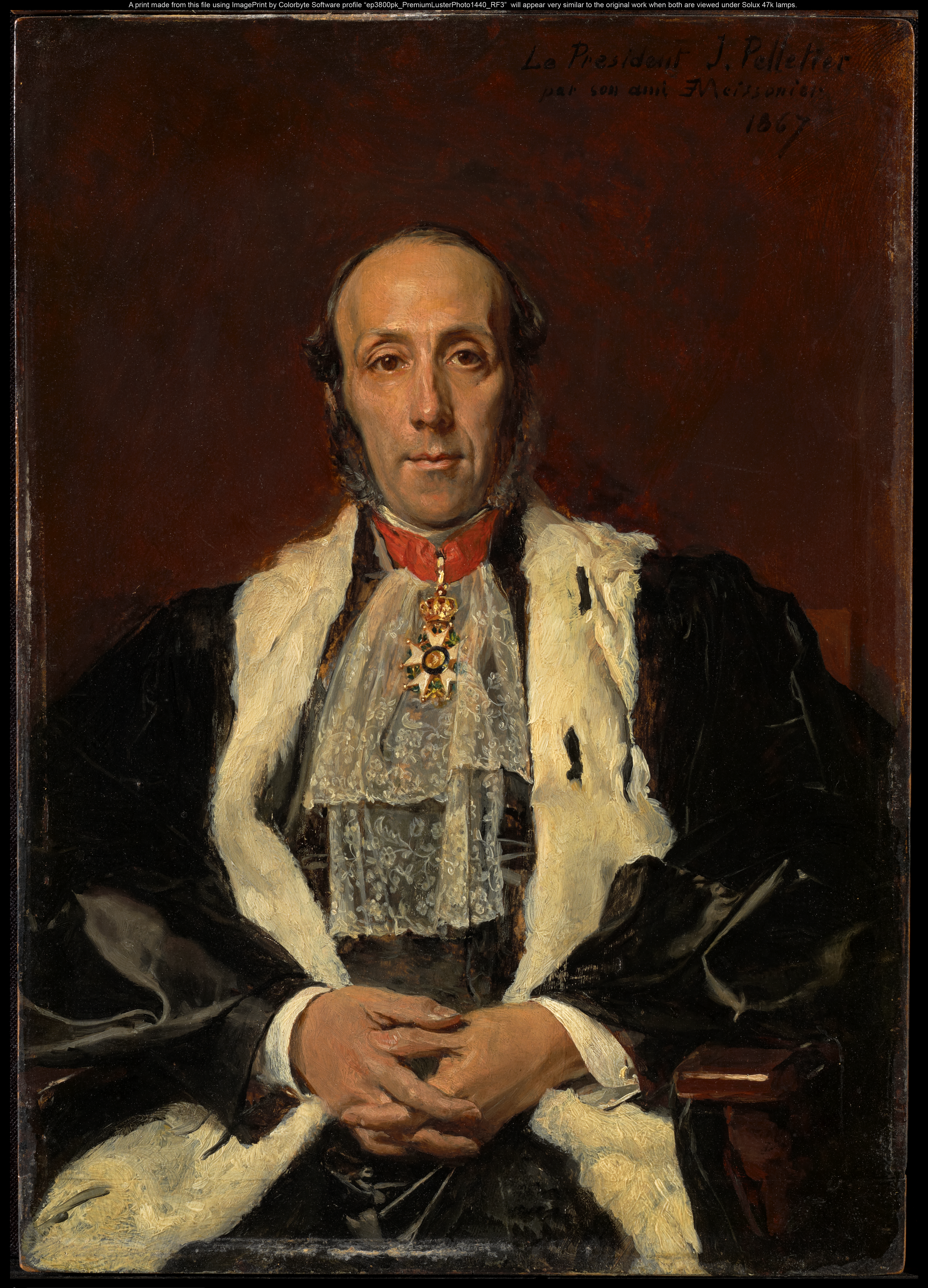
Jules Pelletier, 1867. Clark Art Institute

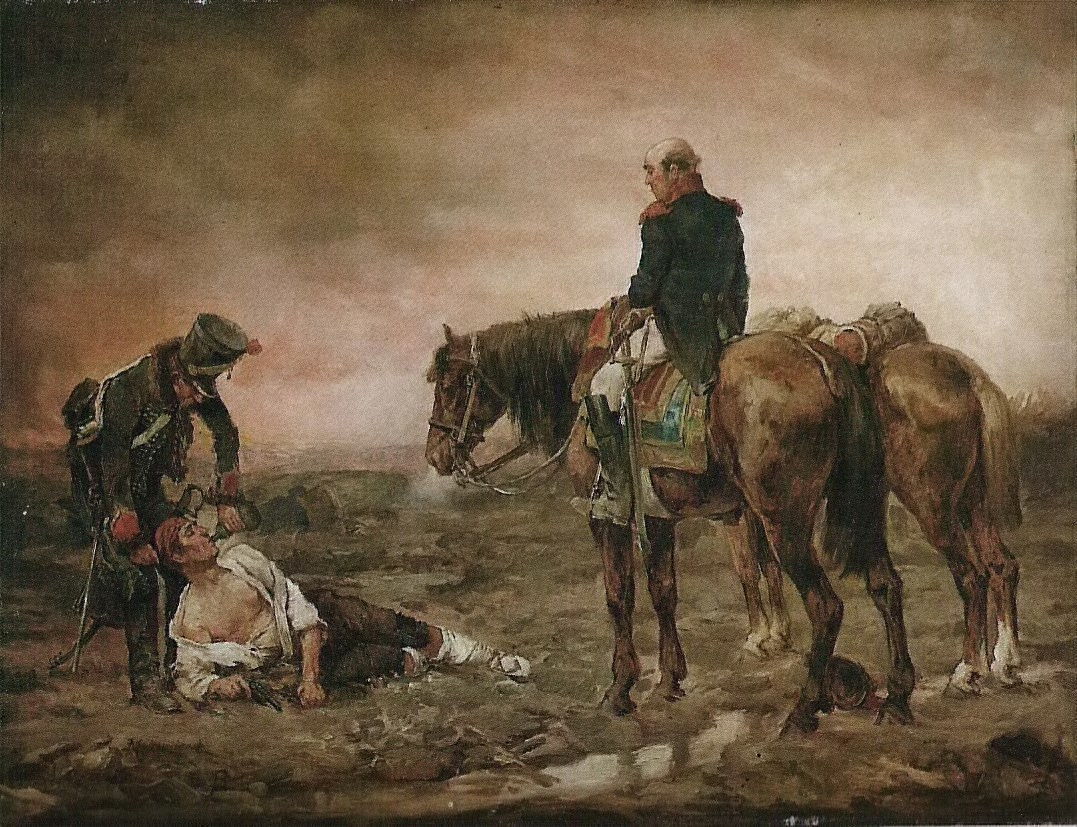
Relief after the Battle

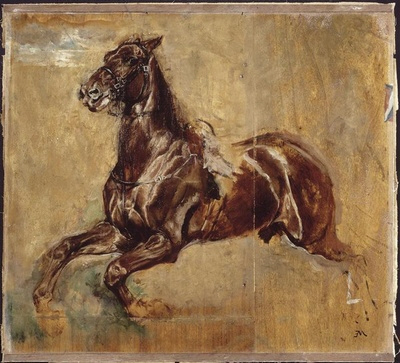
Study of a horse,
jumping at a gallop, n.d.

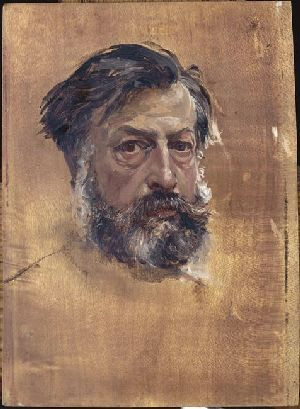
Self-portrait, oil sketch,
ca. 1865

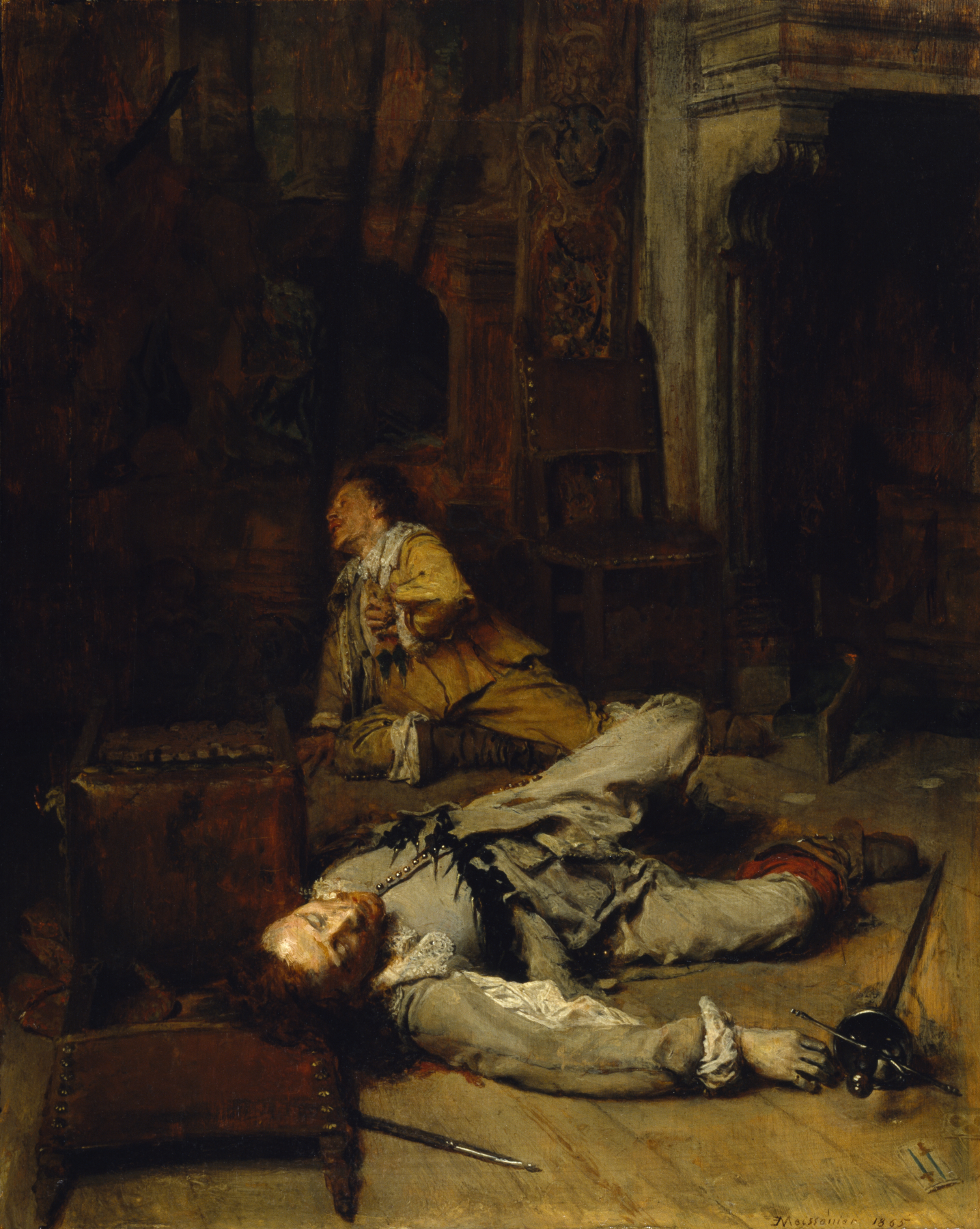
The End of the Game
of Cards, ca. 1870

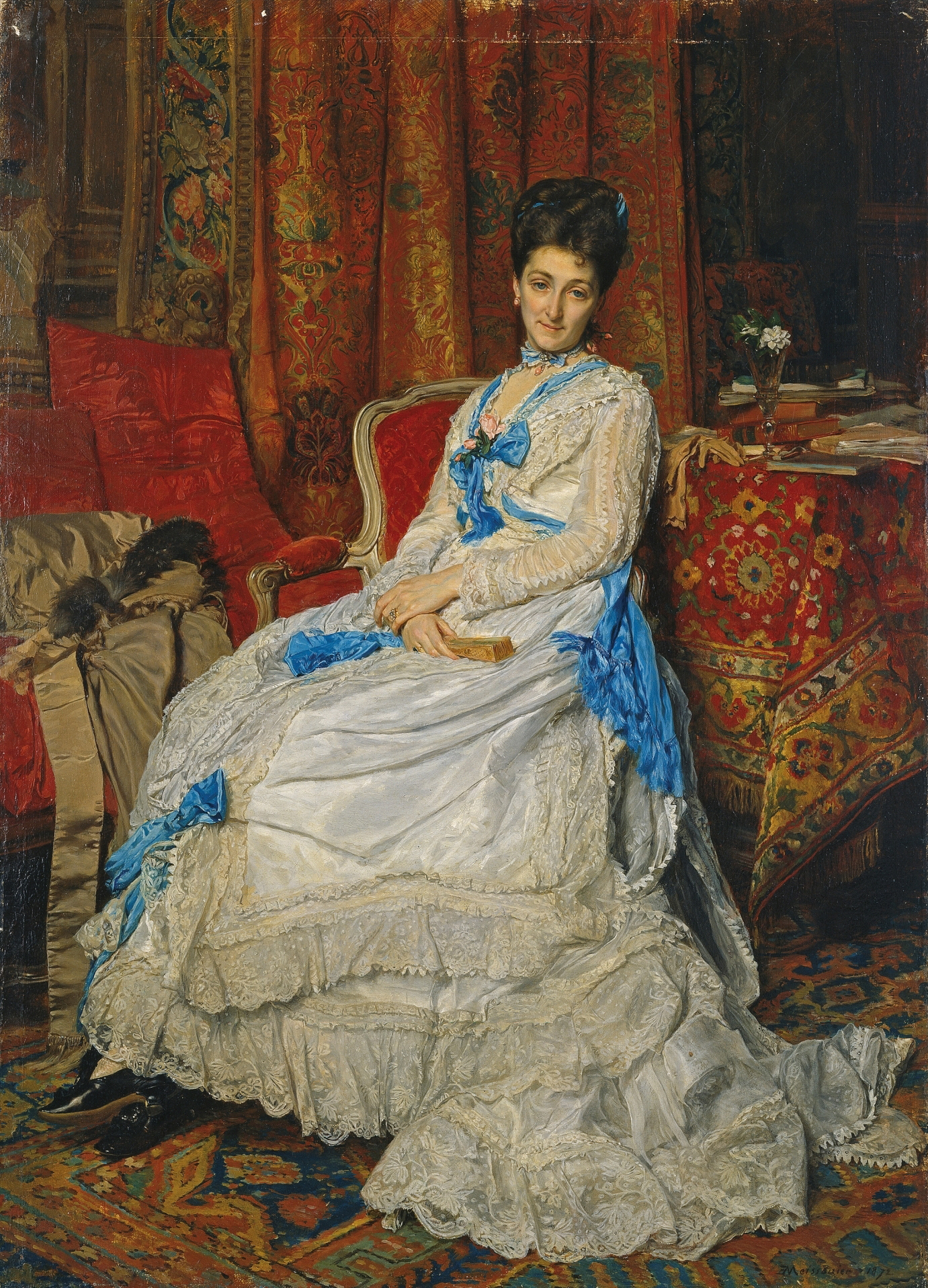
The Marchioness of Manzanedo,
1872

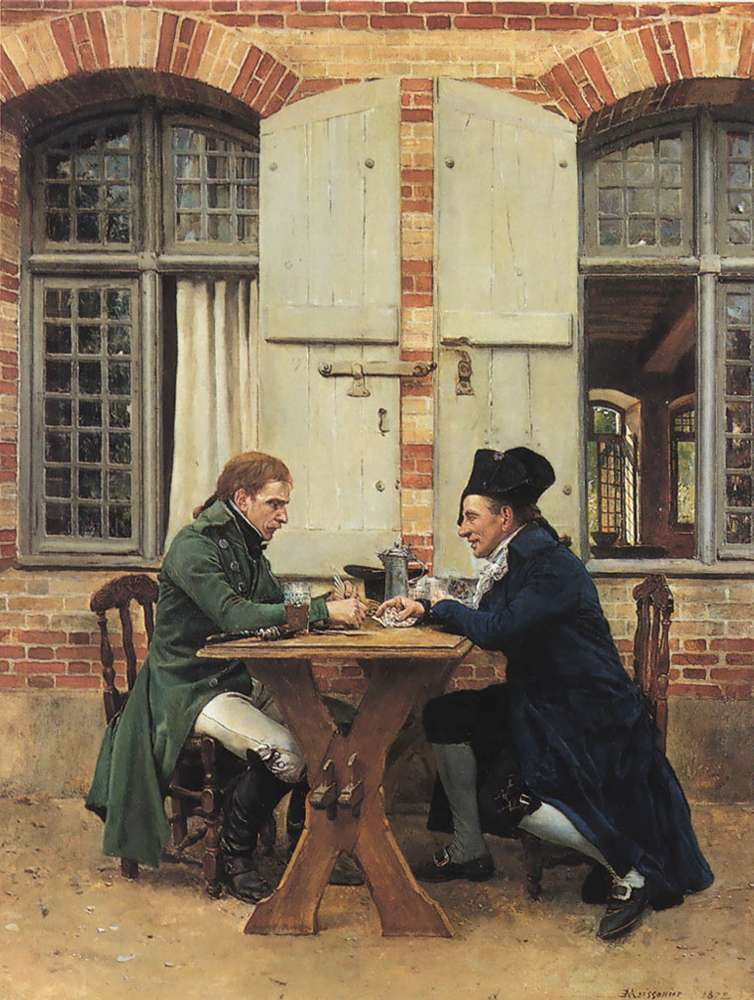
The Card Players,
1872

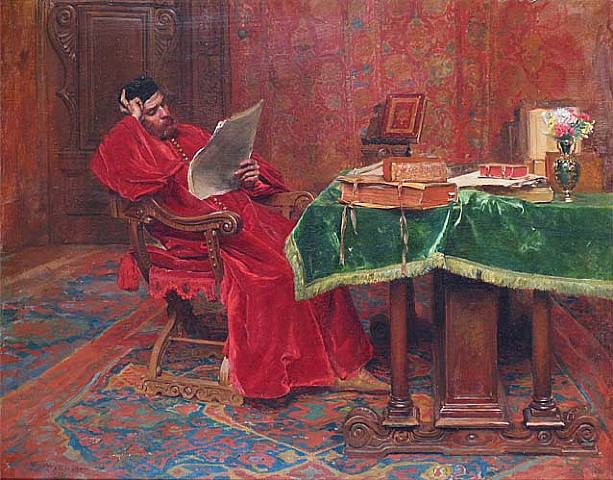
The Philosopher,
1878

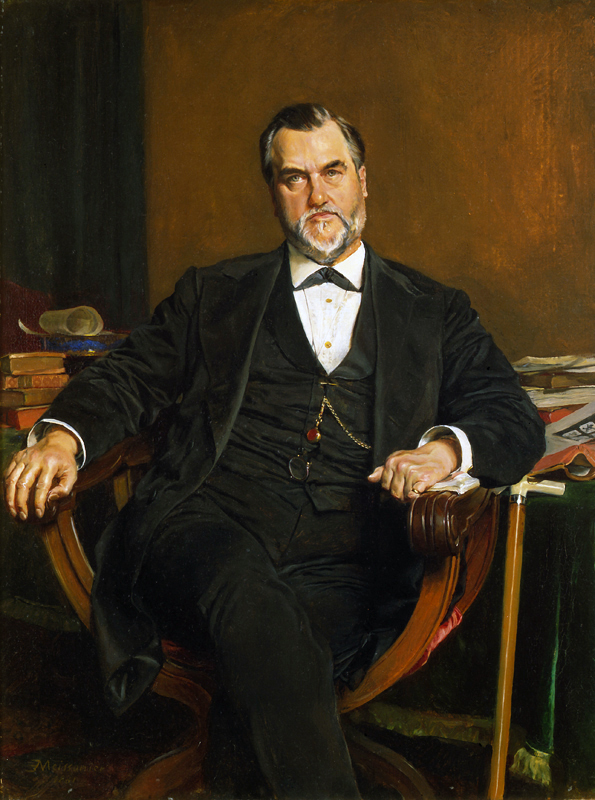
Leland Stanford,
1881

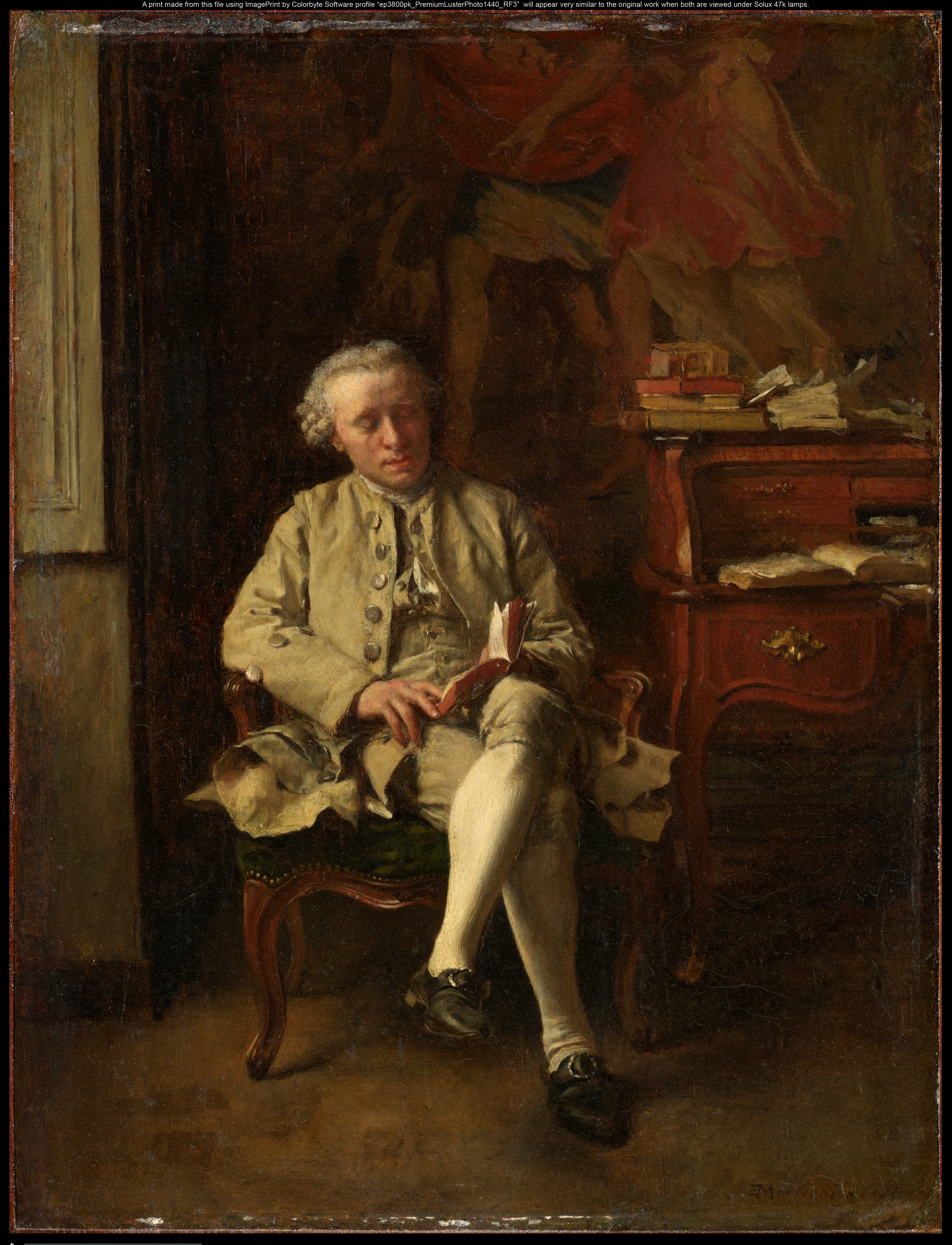
Man Reading, 1851. Clark Art Institute

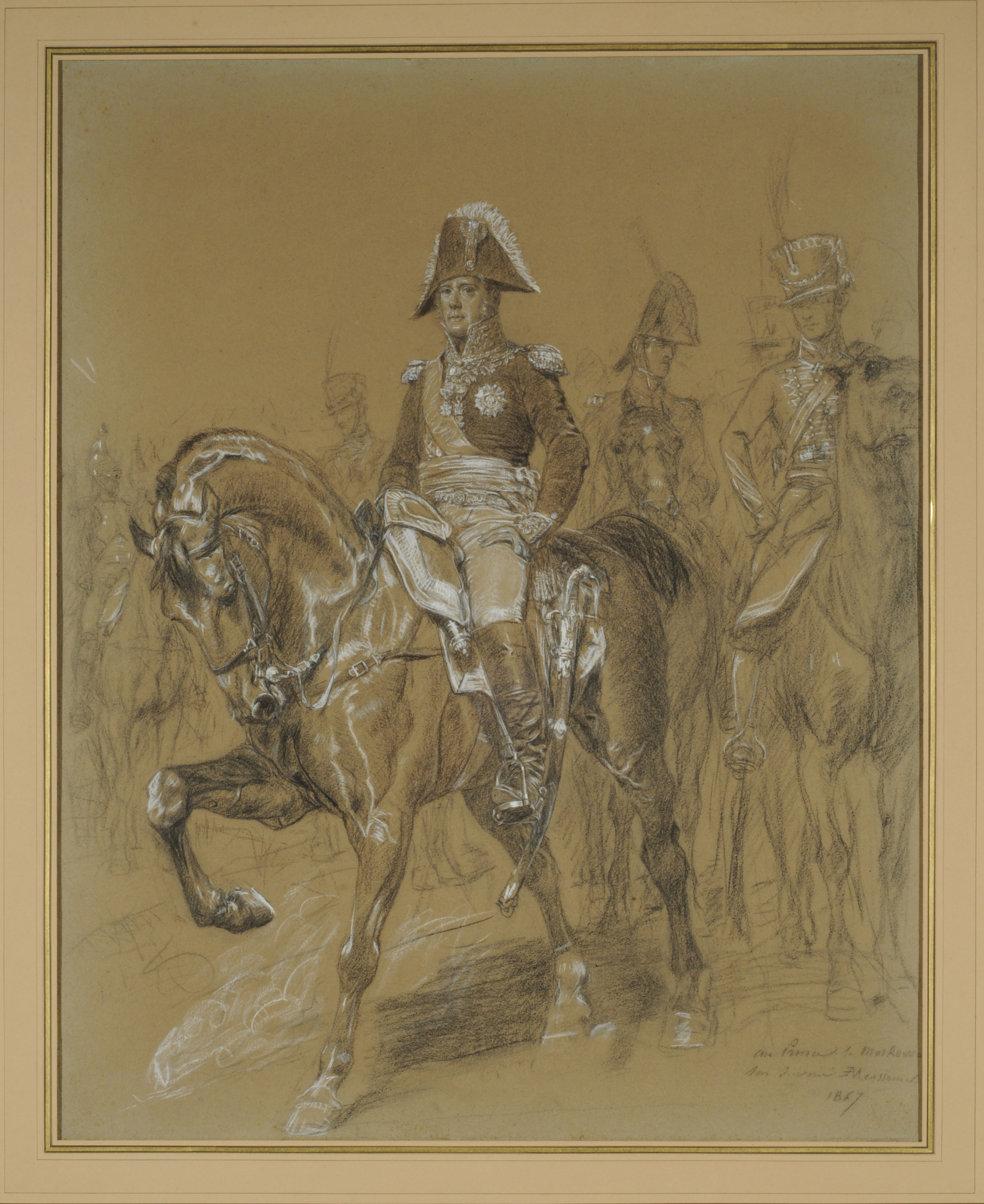
Portrait du Marechal Ney, Duc d'Elchingen

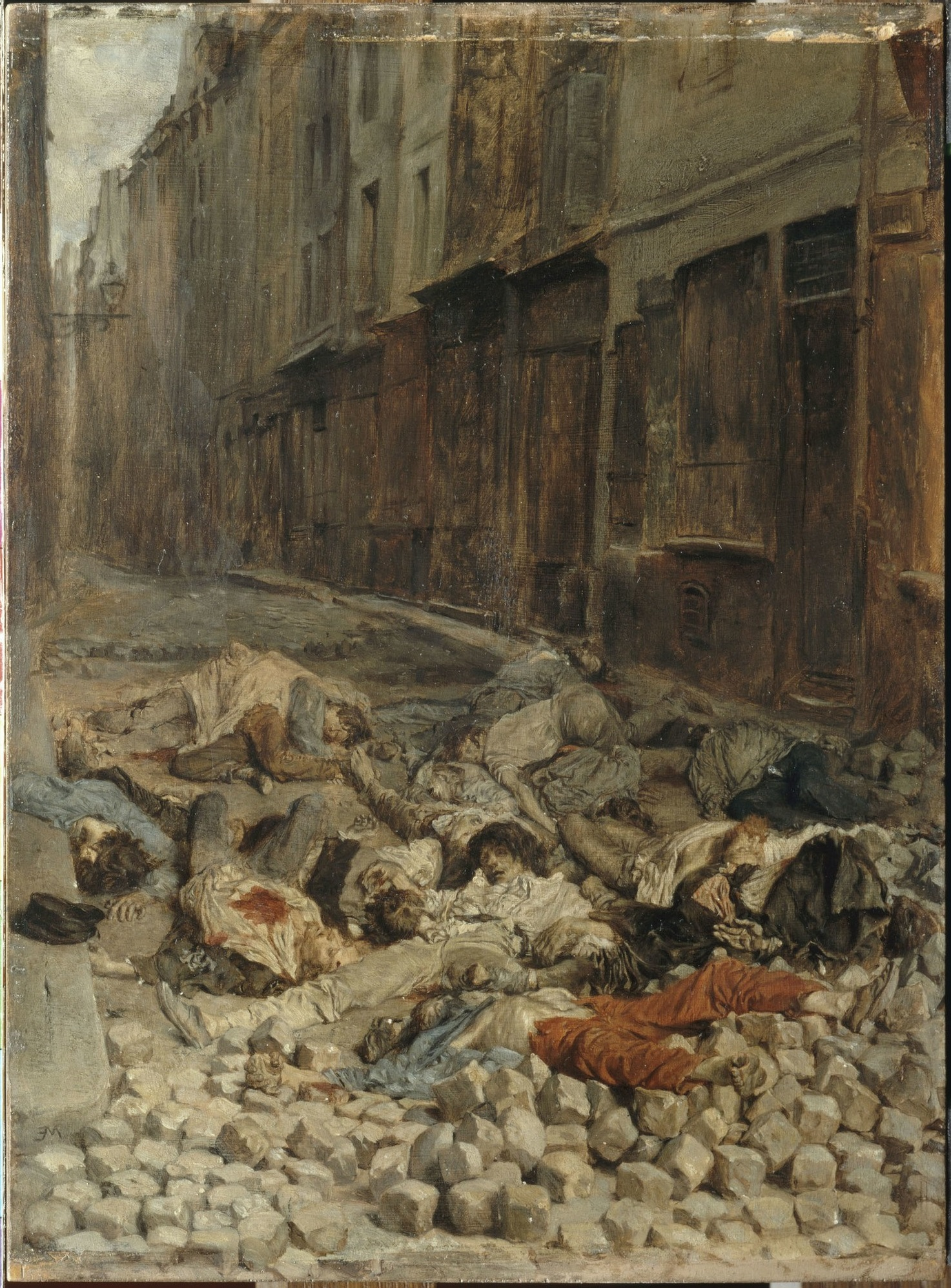
Rue de la Mortellerie, June 1848, 1850 (Louvre)

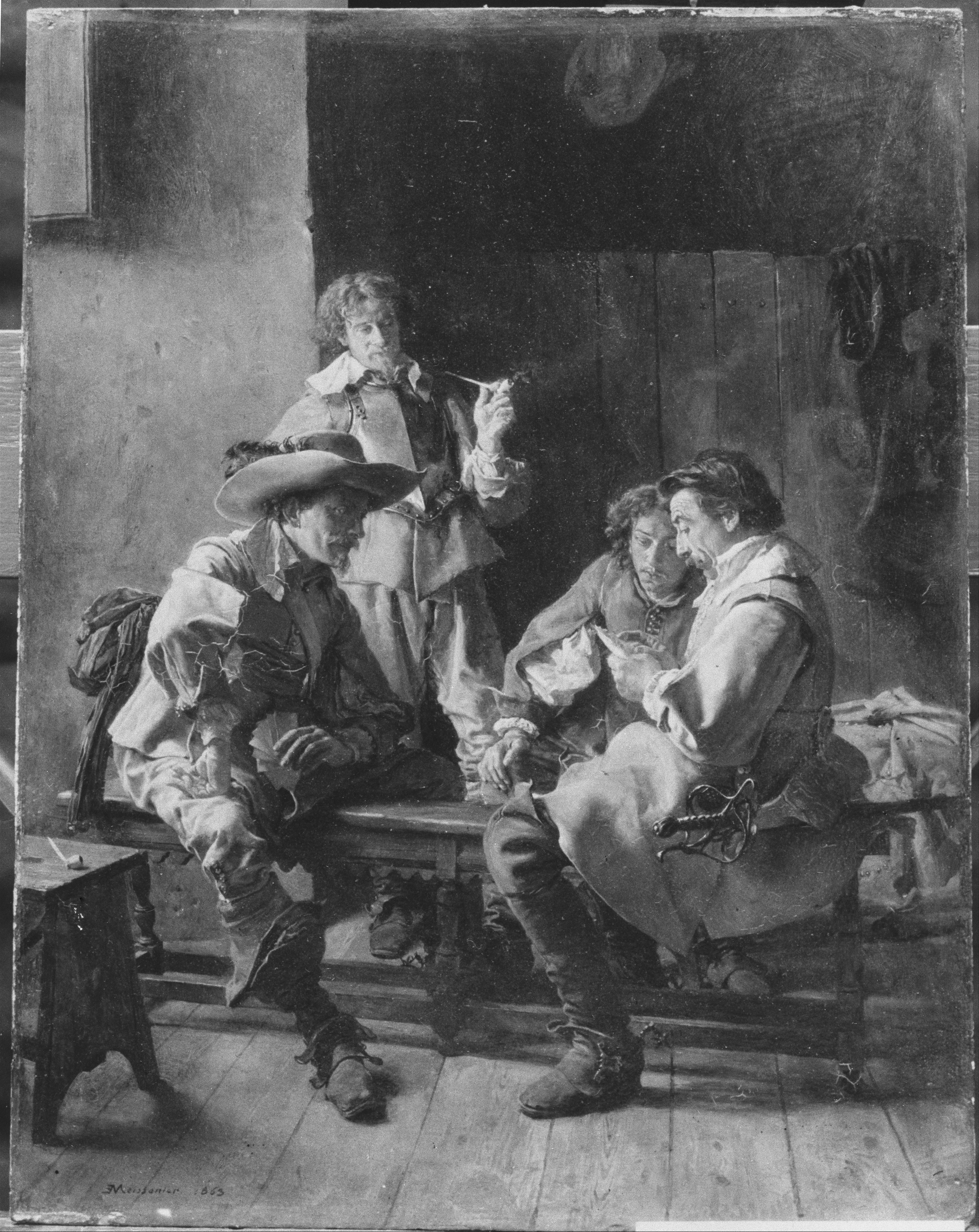
The Card Players, 1863, Metropolitan Museum of Art

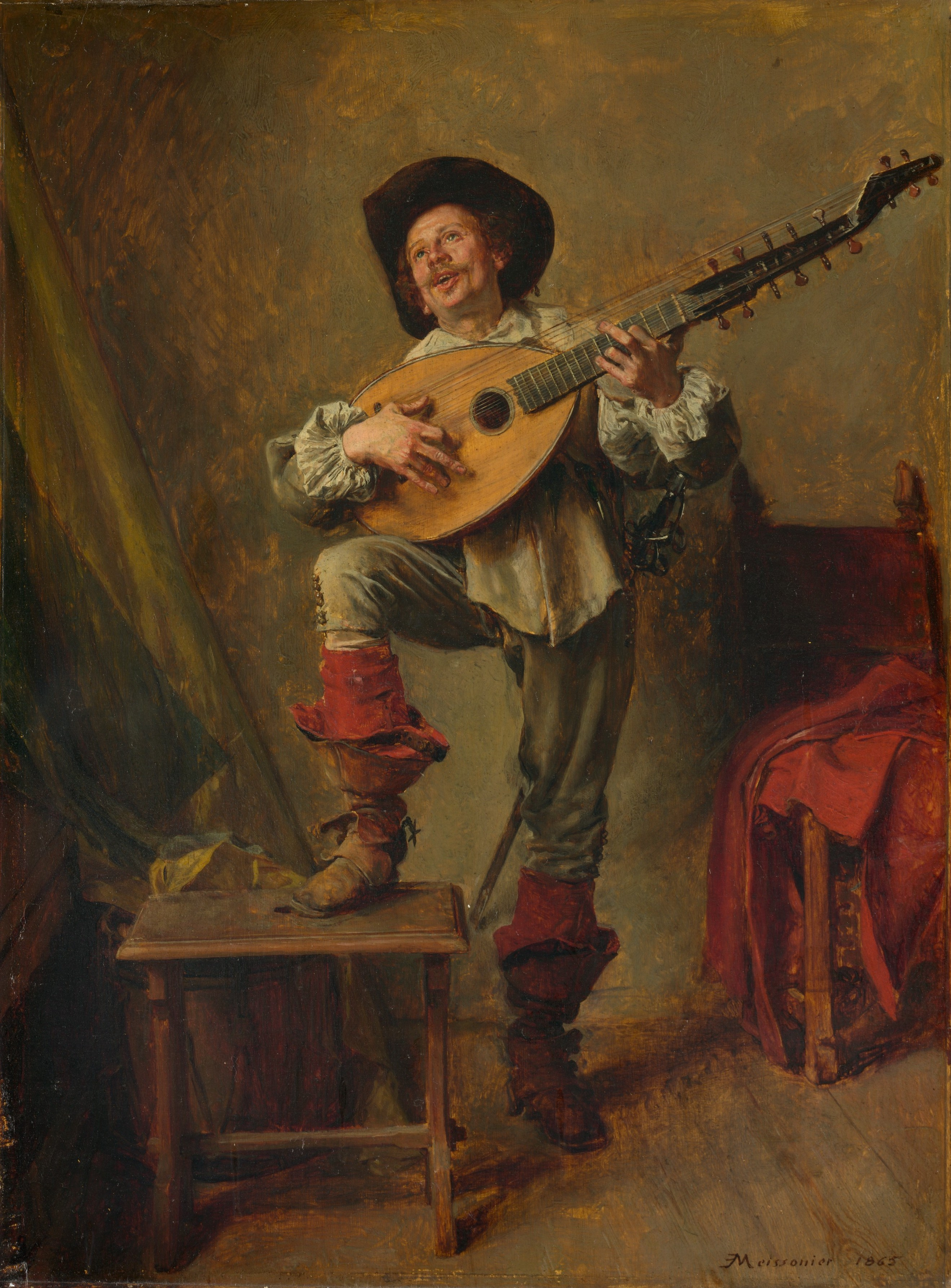
Soldier Playing the Theorbo, 1865, Metropolitan Museum of Art

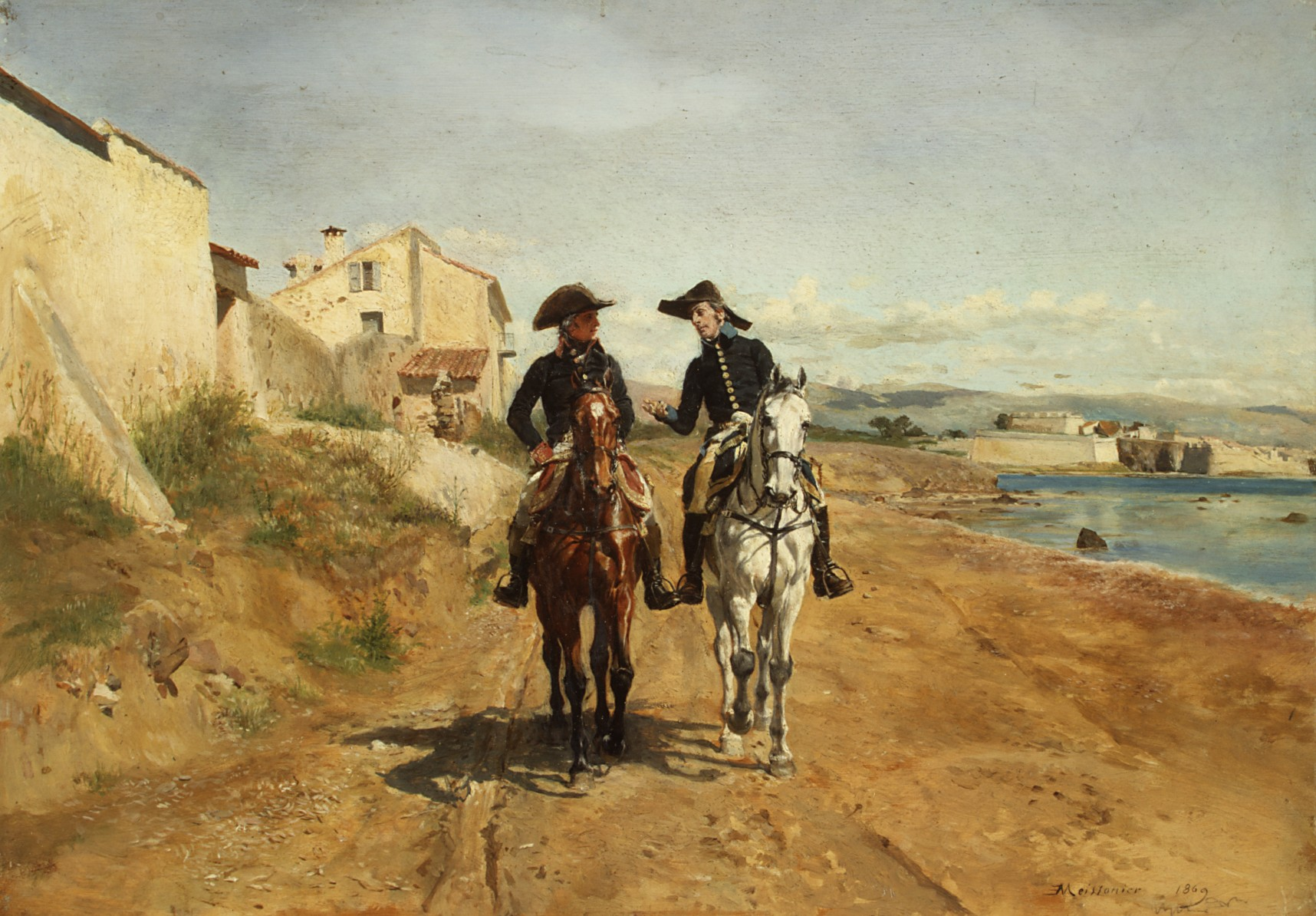
A General and His Aide-de-camp, 1869, Metropolitan Museum of Art

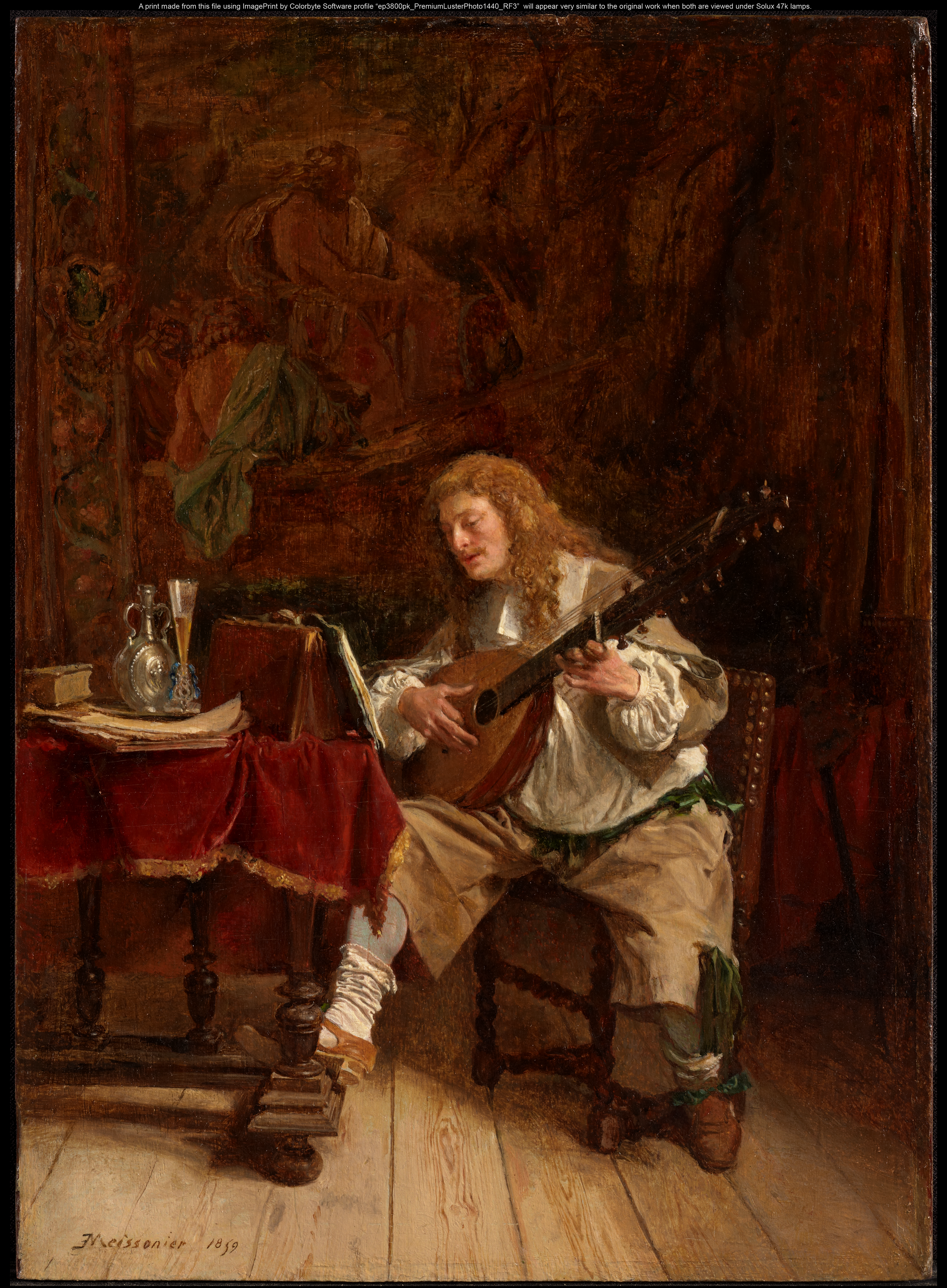
The Musician, 1859. Clark Art Institute

== Pupils ==
- Georges Bretegnier
- Maurice Courant
- Édouard Detaille
- Lucien Gros
- Daniel Ridgway Knight
- Charles Meissonier
- Louis Monziès
- Alphonse Moutte
- Gaylord Sangston Truesdell

== See also ==
- Military art
- List of claims for restitution for Nazi-looted art
