= The Siege of Paris (Meissonier) =

Painting by Ernest Meissonier

- Le Siège de Paris (French)
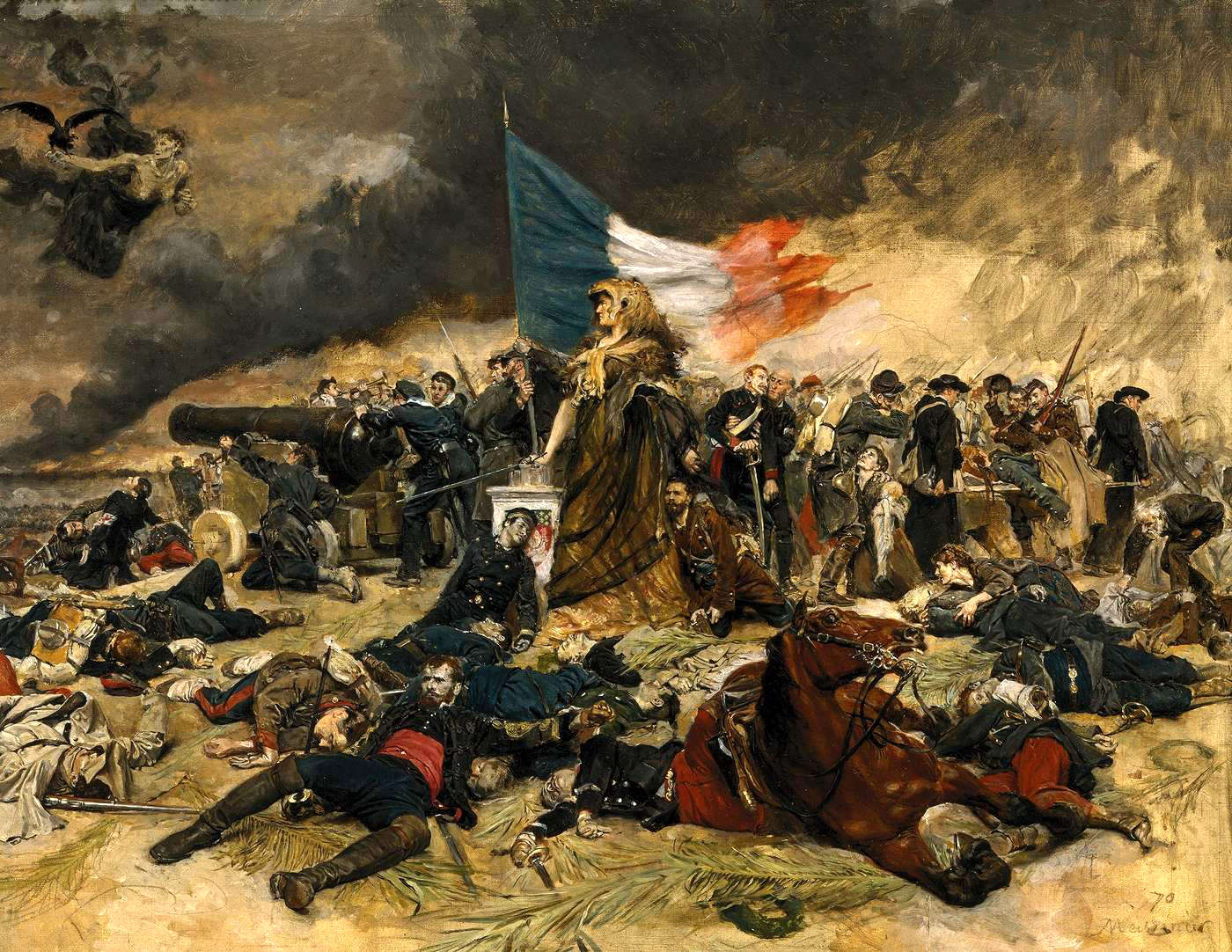
- Artist: Ernest Meissonier
- Year: 1884
- Medium: Oil on canvas
- Dimensions: 53.5 cm × 70.5 cm (21.1 in × 27.8 in)
- Location: Musée d'Orsay, Paris

The Siege of Paris is an oil on canvas painting by French painter Ernest Meissonier, created in 1884. It represents the Siege of Paris (1870–1871), during the Franco-Prussian War. It is held at the Musée d'Orsay, in Paris.

== History and description ==
After the surrender of Napoleon III, at Sedan, on September 2, 1870, the Prussians reached the outskirts of Paris, which was under their siege until January 28, 1871. Several exit attempts to loosen the German grip ended in bitter failures. The Parisians endured the rigors of the siege with courage, until the failure of the battles of January 1871 after which the Government of National Defense decided to negotiate an armistice with the Germans.

Meissonnier conceived this work as a memorial to the French who died at the siege of Paris, mixing realism and allegory. He explained: “I wanted to make a sort of heroic symphony of France."

The painting is built on an opposition between the central figure of the city of Paris, represented by his wife, covered in a lion's skin, with a large French flag, and the specter of famine, emerging from the smoky sky, accompanied by an eagle symbolizing the German Empire, at the left.

In the foreground, lying on the palms of the martyr, lie a number of dead or dying soldiers. They are national guards, mobiles, soldiers and sailors who symbolize the suffering of the entire people. Meissonnier, with realism, also paid tribute to certain illustrious deaths for their exemplary value. In the lower right corner, lies Colonel Picot de Dampierre, commander of the Mobiles de l'Aube, who died at the Battle of Bagneux, in October 1870, at the head of his men, who went on a reconnaissance mission, who is identifiable by his red scarf. He also depicts Captain Néverlée, the leader of a battalion of snipers, who was killed in the Battle of Villiers, and is shown crushed under a wounded horse. At the foot of the figure of Paris, its visible the recumbent figure of Colonel Franchetti, mortally wounded during the exit from the Marne, the November 30, 1870. The painter Henri Regnault is seen dying, kneeling against the side of the allegory which protects him by lifting a section of his veil. He was killed at the age of 27 during the second battle of Buzenval, in January 1871. Meissonnier wanted to symbolize through his death the promising youth who was decimated by the war.

Meissonnier also pays tribute to the anonymous fighters. The paintings shows able-bodied soldiers who are still fighting, on the left, while they load a cannon and sound the charge. It also depicts the suffering of several civilians: an old man searches for his son among the corpses, a mother presents their deceased child to her husband, and a woman cries over the lifeless body of her husband.
