= 1805, Cuirassiers Before the Charge =

Painting by Ernest Meissonier

1805, Cuirassiers Before the Charge 1805
- French: 1805, Les Cuirassiers avant la charge
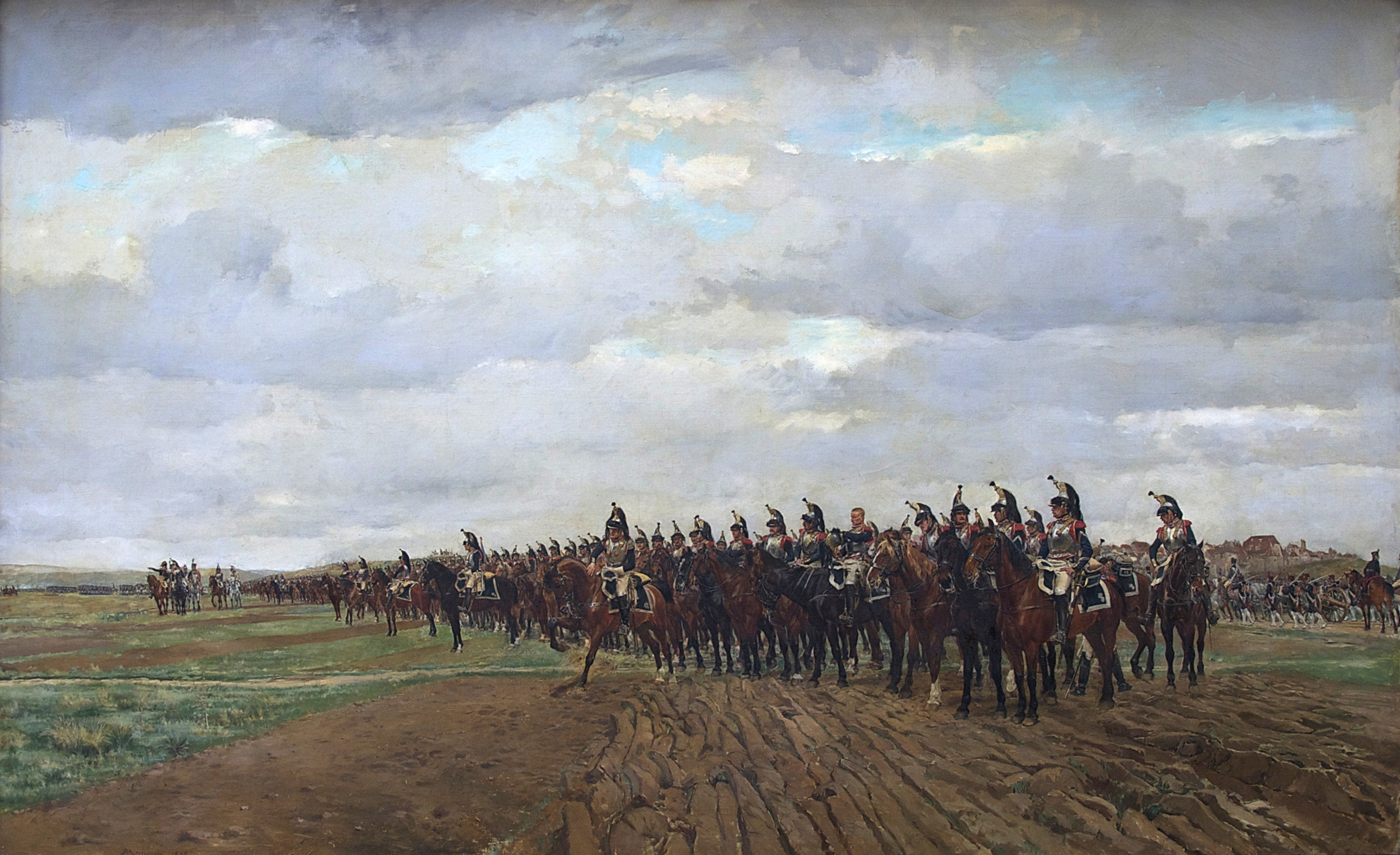
- Artist: Ernest Meissonier
- Year: 1878
- Catalogue: PE 515
- Medium: Oil on canvas
- Subject: 12th Cuirassier Regiment
- Dimensions: 125 cm × 198 cm (49.2 in × 78.0 in)
- Location: Musée Condé, Chantilly

1805, Cuirassiers Before the Charge (French: 1805, Les Cuirassiers avant la charge), also known as Cuirassiers of 1805, before battle or 1805, is an 1878 painting by Ernest Meissonier depicting a line of Napoleonic cuirassiers before making a cavalry charge. It is on display at the Musée Condé, in Chantilly.

== Description ==
This painting depicts a scene set in 1805 during the Napoleonic Wars. Two rows of cuirassiers await the signal to charge, with five non-commissioned officers in front of them also ready. They are wearing the distinctly coloured uniforms of the 12th Cuirassier Regiment. On the left, a Division General in a tail-coat and distinctive gold and scarlet sash is pointing, while addressing a cuirassier officer, probably the Colonel of the 12th Regiment. Behind them stands a trumpeter in yellow, an aide-de-camp to the Division General in a hussar-style uniform, and two more cuirassiers. On the right, a group of artillerymen are moving in front of a row of houses. In the far distance, on a hill between the second and third non-commissioned officer from the right, Napoleon can be seen and his chief of staff.

Meissonier's intention was not to depict a specific battle, but rather a celebration of the cuirassiers of the First French Empire.

== Provenance ==
The painting was first exhibited at the Exposition Universelle of 1878 in Paris. It was bought for 275,000 francs by the Belgian collector Prosper Crabbe, and then passed into the collection of Ernest Secrétan. In the 1889 auction of that collection, it was listed as lot 39 and bought for 199,652 francs by Henri d'Orleans, duke of Aumale. The painting was later donated, alongside the rest of his collection and property, to the Institut de France; it now forms part of the Musée Condé.
