= Brawler (disambiguation) =

Brawler, or Beat 'em up, is a video game genre featuring hand-to-hand combat between the protagonist and an improbably large number of opponents.

Brawler(s) may also refer to:

- Brawler, a 2011 American action drama film
- Mii Brawler, a playable character in Super Smash Bros. for Nintendo 3DS and Wii U and Super Smash Bros. Ultimate
- Mukkabaaz (The Brawler), a 2017 Indian sports drama film
- Playable characters in the video game Brawl Stars

== People ==
- Brawlers (band), an English punk rock group
- The Barroom Brawlers, a professional wrestling tag team from the United States Wrestling Association
- "The Brooklyn Brawler", "The Boston Brawler", "The Broad Street Brawler", stage names for American professional wrestler Steve Lombardi (born 1961)
- "The Brawler", stage name for American professional wrestler Steve Lawler (1965–2021)

== See also ==
- Bakugan Battle Brawlers
- Brawl (disambiguation)
