= Antoine-Marie Chenavard =

French architect, professor, and voyer (1787–1883)

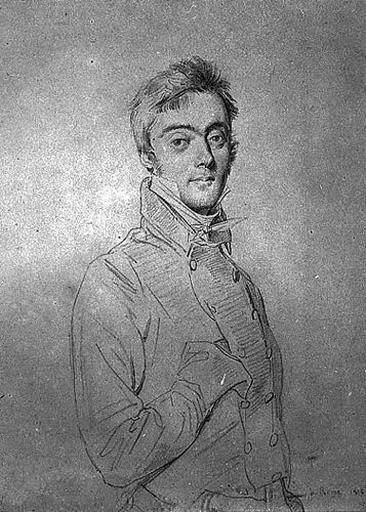
Antoine-Marie Chenavard by Ingres, 1818

Antoine-Marie Chenavard (4 March 1787 - 29 December 1883) was a French architect, professor, and road inspector.

== Publications ==
- Voyage en Grèce et dans le Levant fait en 1843-1844, 1849
- Compositions historiques, esquisses, 1862
- Supplément aux Compositions historiques. Les Poètes, esquisses, 1863
- Fontaines, esquisses, 1864
- Poètes…, 1873
- Sujets tirés des poèmes d'Ossian, 1868
- Monuments d'Athènes : recueil de 12 dessins originaux, 1841
- Église des Cordeliers de l'observance, 1846
- Voyage en Grèce et dans le Levant, 1858
- Six vues et détails dessinés à Athènes en 1843, 1857
- Lyon antique, 1832
