= The Brawl =

Painting by Ernest Meissonier

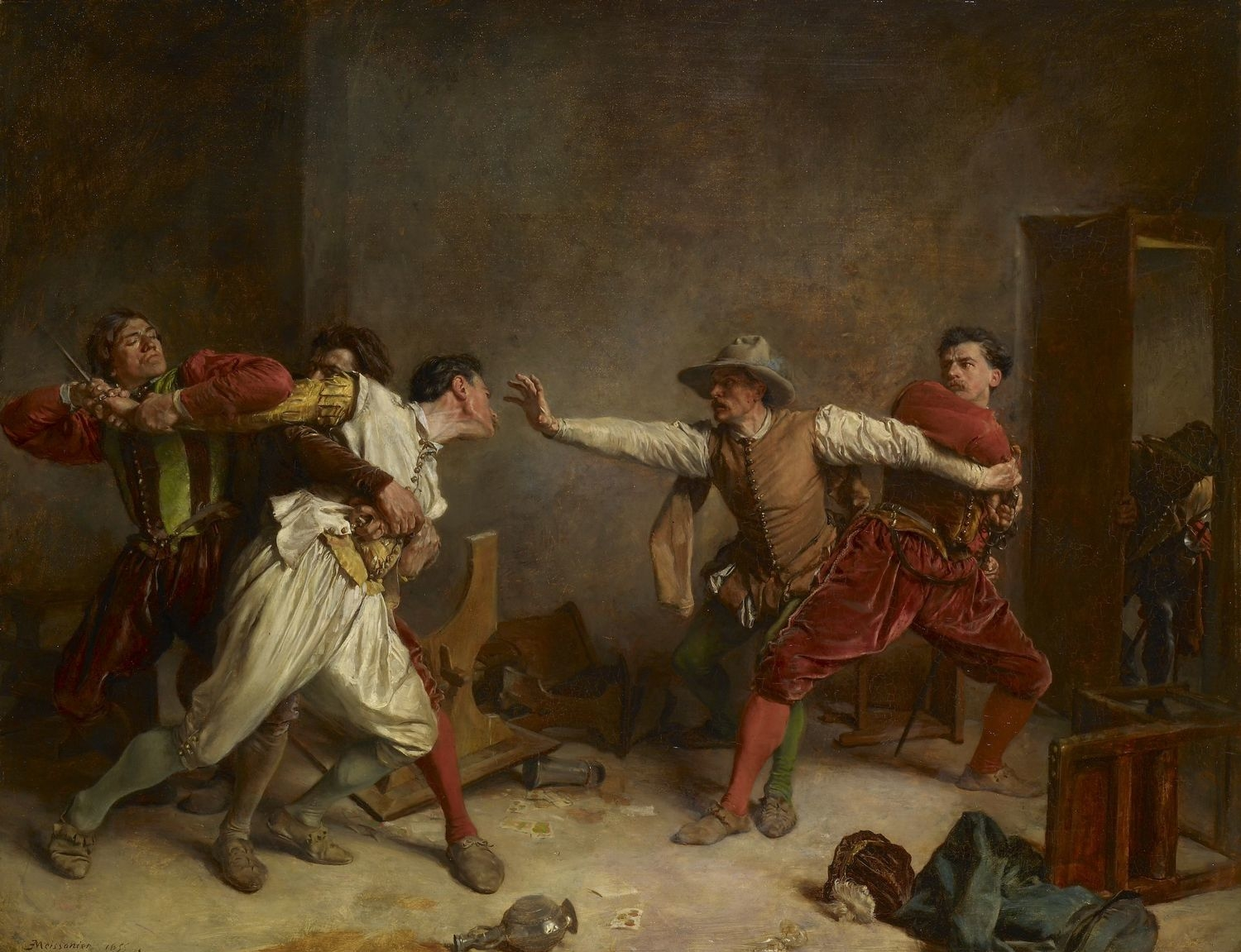
- Artist: Ernest Meissonier
- Year: 1855
- Type: Oil on panel, genre painting
- Dimensions: 44.2 cm × 56.9 cm (17.4 in × 22.4 in)
- Location: Royal Collection

The Brawl (French: La Rixe) is an oil on canvas genre painting by the French artist Ernest Meissonier, from 1855.

== History and description ==
It features a scene set in a seventeenth century tavern where a fight has broken out over a game of cards.

Meissonier, an Academic painter, produced a large number of these genre paintings paying homage to the Old Masters, many of which are now in the Wallace Collection.

The painting was exhibited at the Salon of 1855 held as part of the Exposition Universelle in Paris, one of nine works displayed by Meissonier who was awarded a gold medal. Prince Albert visited the Exposition several times and admired the painting greatly. It was purchased for him as a birthday gift by the French emperor Napoleon III who paid 25,000 francs for it. The painting was displayed at the 1856 exhibition of the Royal Scottish Academy and later as hanging at Osborne House on the Isle of Wight. An etching based on it was subsequently produced by Félix Bracquemond. The picture remains in the Royal Collection.

== Bibliography ==
- Boime, Albert. Art in an Age of Civil Struggle, 1848-1871. University of Chicago Press, 2008.
- King, Ross. The Judgement of Paris: The Revolutionary Decade that Gave the World Impressionism. Pimlico, 2017.
- Marsden, Jonathan. Victoria & Albert: Art & Love. Royal Collection, 2010.
- Norman, Geraldine. Nineteenth-century Painters and Painting: A Dictionary. University of California Press, 1977.
