= Louis Monzies =

French painter (1849–1930)

Louis Monziès
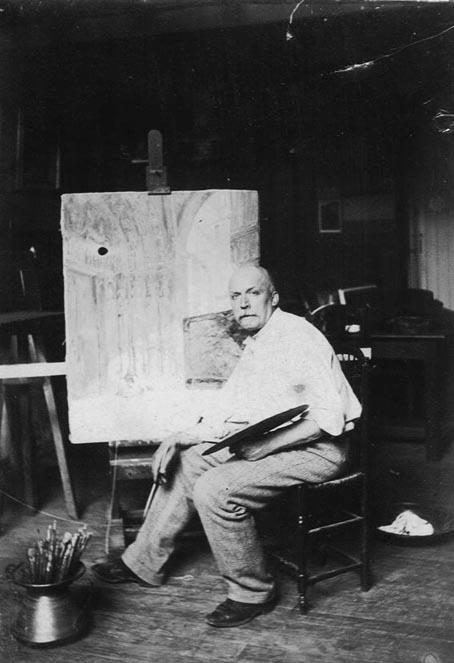
- Louis Monziès in his workshop
- Born: 28 May 1849; Montauban, France
- Died: 13 March 1930 (aged 80); Le Mans, France
- Known for: Painting, Etching
- Movement: Academic art

Louis Monziès (28 May 1849 – 13 March 1930) was a French painter and etcher. He was the curator of the three Museums of Le Mans for 10 years until his death.

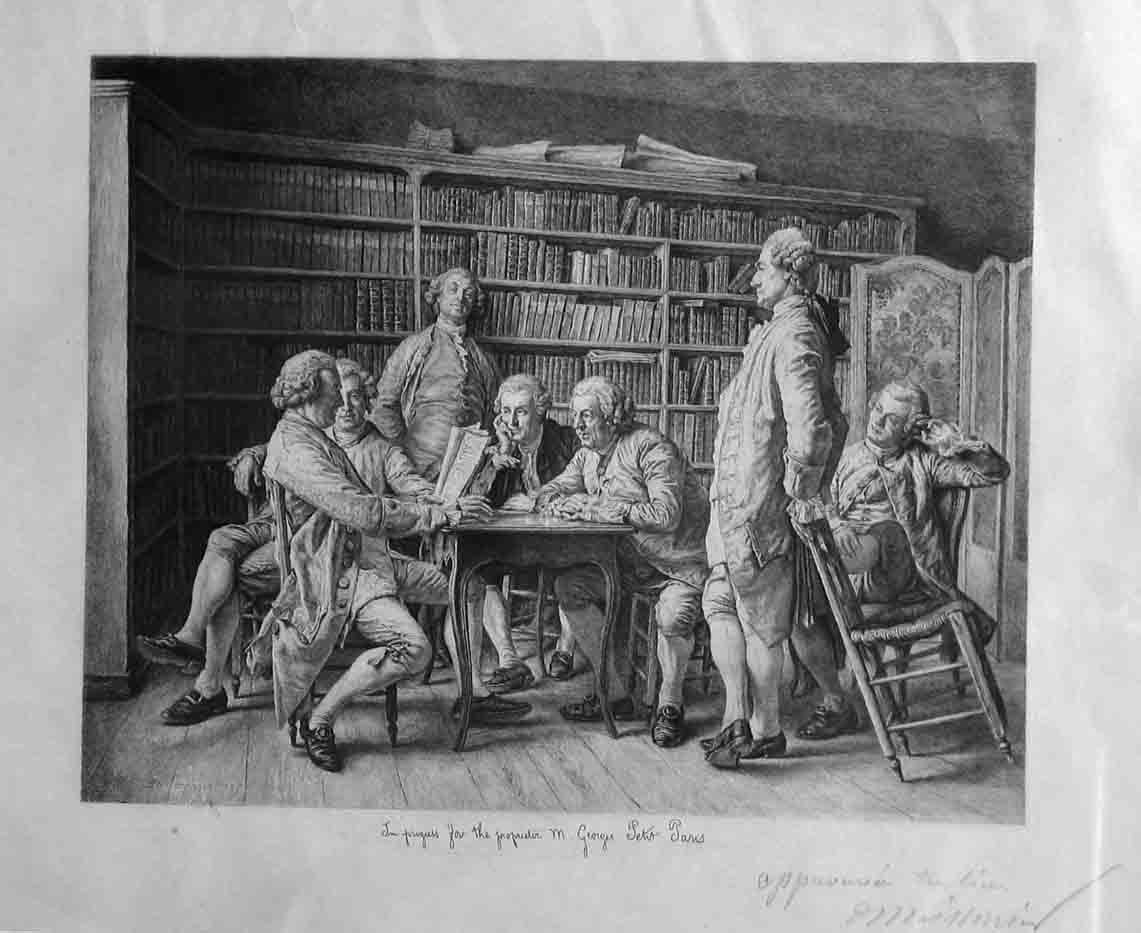
Lecture chez Diderot, etching after Meissonier.

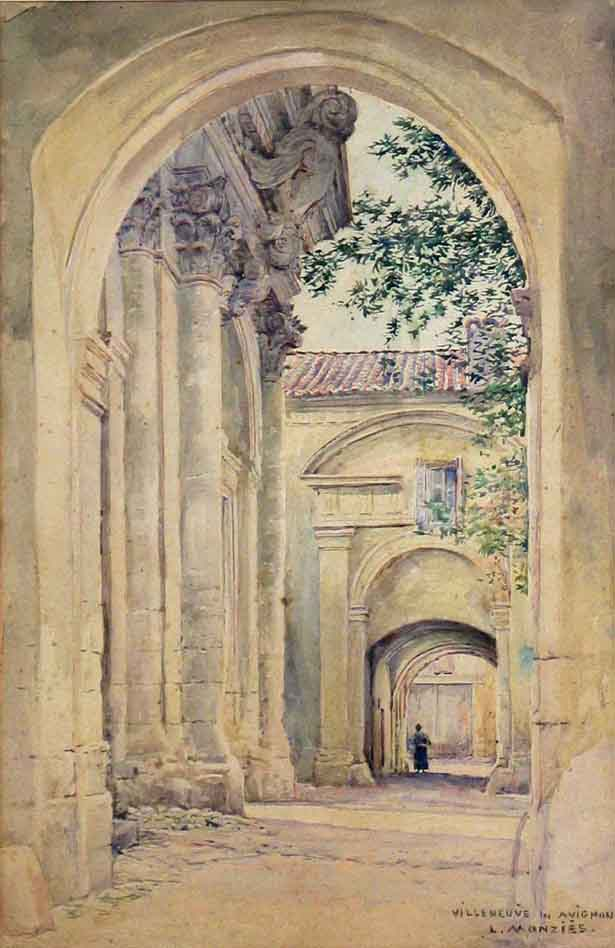
Villeneuve Lez Avignon, watercolor.

== Career ==
Louis Monziès began to learn painting and etching in Paris in 1871 from the painters Jean-Louis Ernest Meissonier and Isidore Pils, and from the etcher Léon Gaucherel. He got second-class and third-class medals in 1876, 1880 and 1881 at the annual Salon in Paris.

He married Eugénie Alphonsine Courtignon in 1882 at Cherbourg and three children were born : Jean in 1889, Pierre in 1891 and Jacques in 1895. He lived then in Paris but he owned also a small house in Normandy near Gréville-Hague.

Louis Monziès carried out etchings for illustrated books and for Art publications, among them, those after Meissonier and Henri Pille. He became a member of the Société des artistes français in 1884 and also a member of the Société des Peintres-Graveurs français in 1891. He was quite popular in Parisian art salons with the Hédouins and in the literary gathering of the editor Lemerre who published famous living writers and poets with Louis' etchings.

Louis Monziès visited London and was named to the Royal Society of Painters-Etchers in 1894 when he received orders for illustrations for English books and publications. His etchings are included in major collections such as The British Library or the Museum of Fine Arts Boston.

But with photo-etching and other new publication processes, etchers were less and less able to make a good living from their skills. Louis Monziès move to Le Mans and became a painting teacher and a painting restoration specialist. He began to paint landscapes and urban environments in Normandy and in other towns like Venise or Avignon. He sold a lot of watercolors and oil paintings before the First World War. A few of these paintings were sent to the US by American officers housed by the painter at the end of the war.

He became the curator of the Museums of Le Mans in March 1920 and stayed so until his death in 1930.

== Illustrated books and Art publications ==
=== Etchings after oil paintings ===
- Season of October (1894) after Bastien-Lepage
- The beggar (1881) after Bastien-Lepage
- Aurore and Céphale after Boucher
- Woman lying down after Boucher
- Pastorale (1902) after Boucher
- The Pilgrims from the Abbey of St. Odile (1876) after Brion
- Burial of a Sailor at Villerville (1880) after Butin
- Hare after Chardin
- Sarah Bernard (1881) after Clairin
- Portrait of the etcher Schmidt after de La Tour
- The bath (1897) after Demont Breton
- Self-portrait with his family (1891) after de Vos
- Portrait of Ulysse Butin (1880) after Duez
- Th birth after Duez
- Wedding at City Hall (1873) after Durand
- Portraits of Mr and Mrs Edwin Edwards after Fantin-Latour
- Young girl with small dogs (1888) after Fragonard
- Hawking (1877) after Fromentin
- Sarah Siddons after Gainsborough
- In 1795 (1895) after Goupil
- Wonderful after Goupil
- The payer after Greuze
- Washerwomen after Heilbuth
- Bridesmaids to marry after Jiménez Aranda
- Henri de la Rochejacquelein after Le Blant
- Fishing (1880) after Leloir
- Apotheosis de Carpeaux (1892) after Maignan
- Bridge inn of Poissy (1889) after Meissonier
- Harlequin with a rose (1888) after Meissonier
- Son of Meissonier as Louis XIII (1888) after Meissonier
- Koubra in the workshop after Meissonier
- Young man reading after Meissonier
- At Diderot's Library (1885) after Meissonier
- Maréchal Duroc Duc de Frioul (1876) after Meissonier
- Musketeer after Meissonier
- Dutch woman and child after Neuhuys
- Portrait of woman in red after Pontormo
- The Martyrdom of Saint Sebastian (1879) after Ribot
- Henry VI after Seymour Lucas
- Confidence after Stevens
- Rider on a sofa (1870) after Vibert
- Coquelin elder (1875) after Vibert
- Melon merchant (1876) after Vibert
- Lady Lindsay of Balcarres (1877) after Watts
- Hugo Van Der Goes at the convent of Rooden Cloestere (1875) after Wauters
- Flemish Postal Station after Wouwerman

=== Etchings for French books ===
- Abbé Prévost - Manon Lescaut, Lemerre, 1870, 1878 : etchings after Gravelot and Jacques Jean Pasquier
- Ackermann - Œuvres, Lemerre, 1877 : frontispiece
- Arène - Œuvres, Lemerre, 1877 : frontispiece
- Asselineau - Le livre des sonnets, Lemerre, 1893 : frontispiece
- Barbey d'Aurevilly - Le bonheur dans le crime, Société Normande du livre illustré, 1897 : etchings after Regamey
- Beaumarchais - Le barbier de Séville, Librairie des Bibliophiles, 1882 : etchings after Santiago Arcos
- Beaumarchais - Le mariage de Figaro, Librairie des Bibliophiles, 1882 : etchings after Santiago Arcos
- Bernardin de Saint-Pierre - Paul et Virginie, Lemerre 1877 : frontispiece
- Boileau- Œuvres, Lemerre, 1875 : etchings after Cochin
- Brillat-Savarin - Physiologie du goût, Carteret 1923
- Burty - L'eau-forte en 1875, Cadart 1875 : etching "L'amateur de tableaux"
- Burty - L'eau-forte en 1878, Cadart 1878 : etching "L'opinion du modèle"
- Châteaubrian - Œuvres, Lemerre, 1877 : frontispiece after Devéria
- Chénier - Poésies, Charpentier 1888 : etchings after Bida,
- Claretie - Œuvres, Lemerre, 1886 : frontispiece
- Desbordes-Valmore- Œuvres poétiques, Lemerre 1886 : frontispiece
- Dorchain - Poésies, Lemerre, 1895 : frontispiece
- Flaubert, Théatre, Lemere, 1885 : frontispiece
- Hugo - Cromwell, Lemerre : frontispiece
- Hugo - Légende des siècles, Edition Nationale Emile Testard & Cie, 1886 : etchings after E. Bordes
- Hugo - Les Orientales, etchings
- Hugo - Odes et ballades, etchings
- Hugo - Notre-Dame de Paris, Lemerre, 1879 : etchings after Pille
- La Fontaine - Contes, Lemerre, 1876 : etchings after Fragonard, Lancret, Pater, Boucher, Eisen, Vleughels
- La Fontaine - Fables, Lemerre : etchings after Oudry
- Lafenestre - Le livre d'or du salon de peinture et de sculpture 1881, Librairie des bibliophile, 1881 : etching
- Lemaistre de Sacy - L'Histoire de Joseph, Hachette 1878 : etchings after Bida
- Lemaistre de Sacy - L'Histoire de Tobie, Hachette 1880 : etchings after Bida
- Lesage - Histoire de Gil Blas de Santillane, Lemerre : etchings after Pille
- Lesage - Le Diable boiteux, Lemerre : etchings after Pille
- Louvet de Couvray - Les amours du chevalier de Faublas, Librairie des Bibliophiles, 1884 : etchings after Avril
- Mantz - François Boucher, Quantin : etchings after Boucher
- Martial - L'Illustration nouvelle par une société de peintres-graveurs à l'eau-forte, sixième année, Cadart 1879 : etching "Le joueur de Mandoline"
- Michelet, Jeanne d'Arc, Hachette, 1888 : etchings after Bida
- Musset, Œuvres, Lemerre, 1878 : etchings after Pille
- Perrault - Contes de Fées, Lemerre : etchings after Pille
- Portalis - Honoré Fragonard, sa vie et son oeuvre, Rothschild, 1889 : etching
- Racine, Œuvres, Lemerre, 1874 : etchings after Gravelot
- Sarasin, frontispiece
- Scarron - Le Roman Comique, Lemerre : etchings after Pille
- Shakespeare - Œuvres, Lemerre : etchings after Pille
- Uzanne - Caprices d'un bibliophile, 1878 : etchings
- Voltaire - Romans, Lemerre, 1878 : etchings after Monnet and Marillier

=== Etchings for English books ===
- Brooks - Dames and Daughters of the French Court : portrait of Madame Valmore
- Charles and Mary Lamb - Tales from Shakespeare, Heath & Co, 1908 : etchings
- Chevillard Lenoir - Celebrated Artists Sketches of Their Lives and Works, Nims & Knight, 1888
- Comyns Carr - Examples of Contemporary Arts. Etchings from Representative Works by living English and Foreign Artists, 1878 : etching "Lady Lindsay of Balcarres" d'après Watts
- Hugo - Dramas, G. Barrie, 1896 : etching after E. Bordes
- Louvet de Couvray - The amours of the chevalier de Faublas, Société des Bibliophiles, 1898 : etchings after Avril
- Musset - All writings, Edwin C. Hill
