= Léon Gaucherel =

French painter (1816–1886)

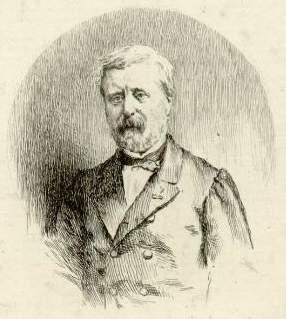
Léon Gaucherel, by Charles Courtry (1871)

Léon Gaucherel (21 May 1816, Paris – 7 January 1886, Paris) was a French painter and etcher.

== Biography ==
He learned art from his childhood friend, Eugène Viollet-le-Duc, whom he accompanied to Sicily from 1836 to 1837. His first major works were illustrations for a project to restore Notre-Dame, proposed by his friend and Jean-Baptiste Lassus in 1843. The following year, he began to master the art of etching.

Over time, he went from producing original engravings to making reproductions of works by other artists. By 1858, the transition was complete and he began creating illustrations for magazines; notably the Gazette des Beaux-Arts and the Annales Archéologiques, where he depicted decorative architectural details. His work on the Gazette, together with his fellow printmaker Léopold Flameng, helped to establish that publication's reputation.

He was an active member of the Société des aquafortistes and, in 1864, was named a Knight in the Legion of Honor. In 1866 he created a large album of still-lifes to promote etching, which was still considered to be more of a craft than an art. The latest techniques were introduced in an exhibition at the Salon.

In 1875, he became the artistic director for the weekly revue, L'Art, founded by Eugène Véron. During his tenure, he recruited several engravers to be permanent staff members. Among the most popular was Auguste-Hilaire Léveillé. In addition to his creative activities, he also took numerous students, including Victor Gustave Lhuillier, Louis Monzies, Edmond Ramus, and Adolphe Lalauze.

The museum of art and history in Sainte-Menehould has preserved many of his original plates.

== Selected works ==
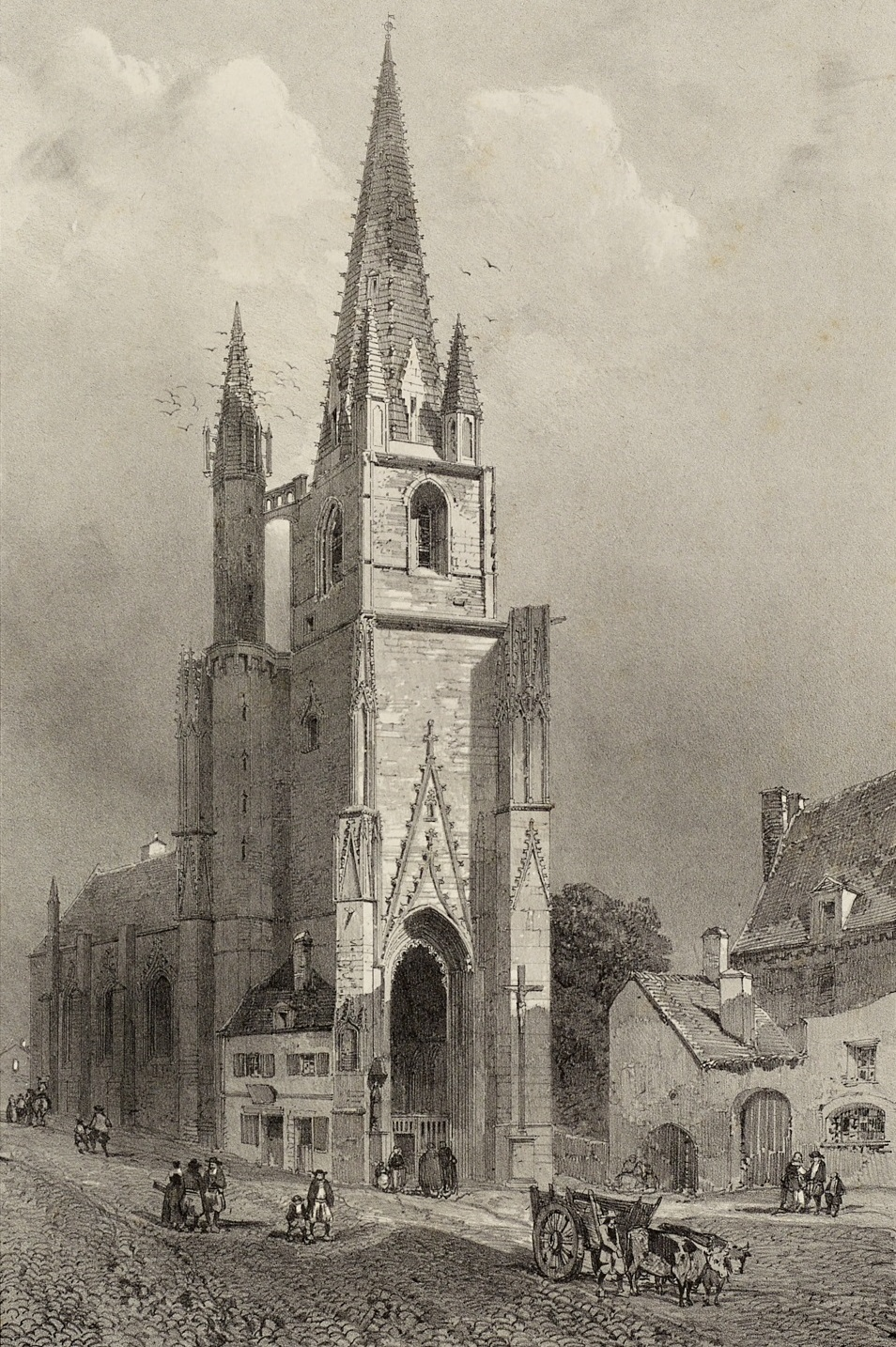
Basilique Notre-Dame-de-Paradis

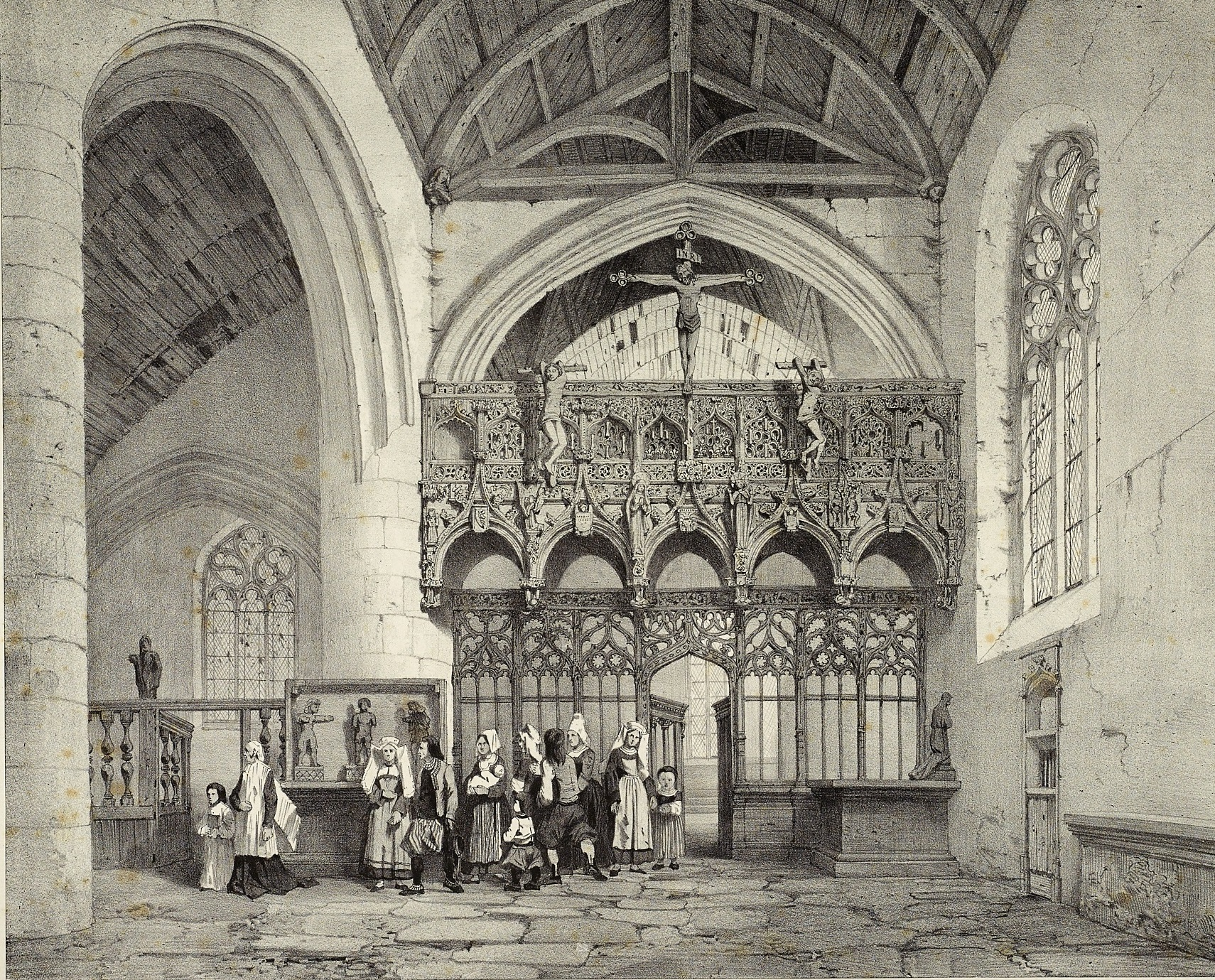
The Chapelle Saint-Fiacre du Faouët

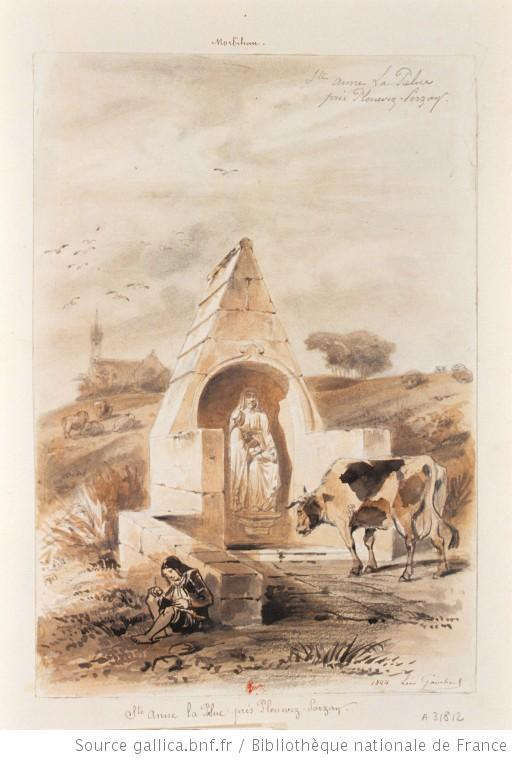
Fountain of Sainte-Anne-la-Palud, Plonévez-Porzay

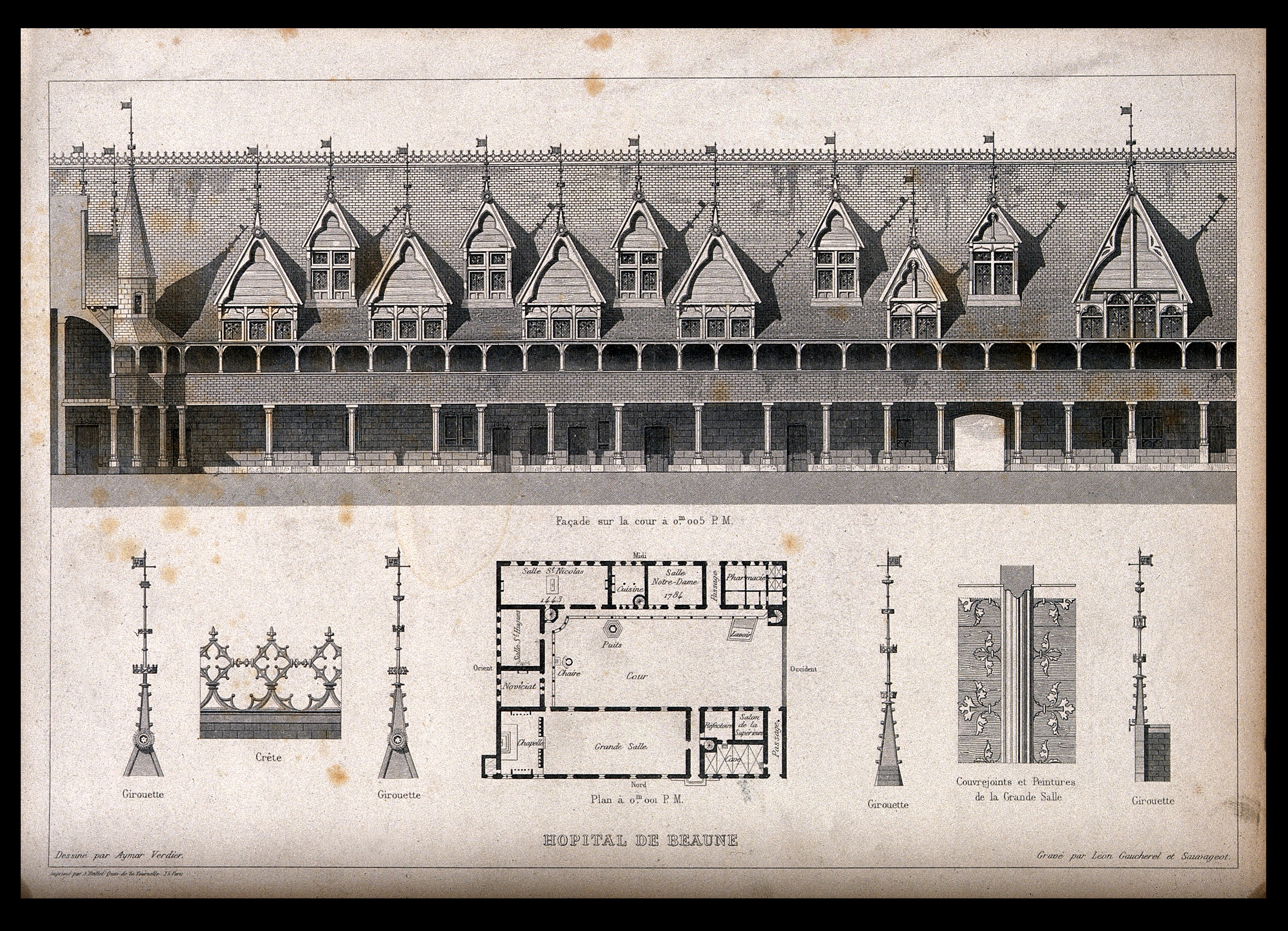
The roof of the Hospices de Beaune

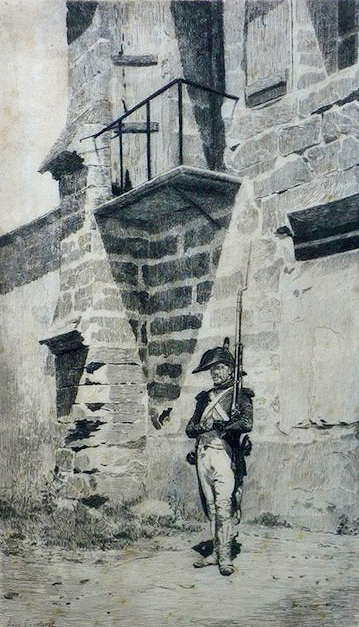
The Sentinel
(after Meissonier)
