= Henri Michel-Lévy =

French painter (1844–1914)

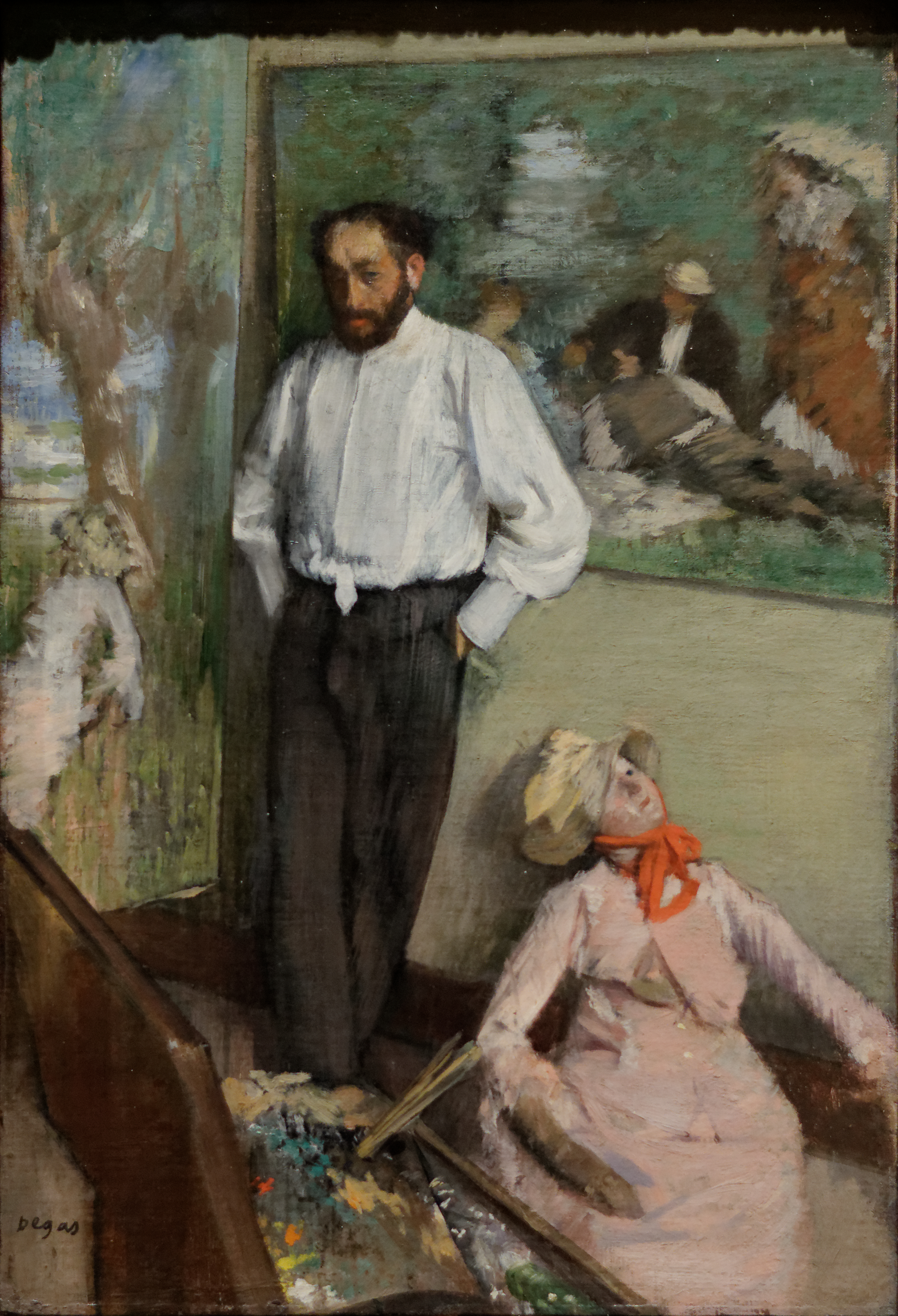
- Portrait of Henri Michel-Lévy (1878) by Edgar Degas, Gulbenkian Museum, Lisbon
- Born: Henri Lévy; July 11, 1844; Passy, France
- Died: September 17, 1914 (aged 70); Paris, France
- Resting place: Montmarte Cemetery
- Known for: portraits, landscape paintings, genre paintings, pastels
- Notable work: Le Peintre Eugène Boudin peignant des animaux dans la prairie de Deauville (1880)
- Movement: Impressionism

Henri Michel-Lévy (July 11, 1844 in Passy, France - September 17, 1914 in Paris), was a French impressionist painter.

== Biography ==
Henri was the third of the four sons of Michel Lévy and Thérèse Emerique, a Jewish couple originally from the Lorraine province in the north-east of France. Michel Lévy became a wealthy publisher in Paris, where Henri became a pupil of the painters Félix Barrias (1822-1907) and of Antoine Vollon (1833-1900).

From 1868 to 1878, his paintings at the annual Paris Salon were cataloged under the name Henri-Michel Lévy or Michel Lévy; from 1879, he took the name Henri Michel-Lévy, perhaps to avoid confusion with his contemporary, the painter Henri-Léopold Lévy.

Michel-Lévy also became an art collector of some distinction, as can be seen from the works of Watteau, Boucher, Fragonard, Delacroix, Hubert Robert, Prud'hon, Tiepolo, and numerous others included in the posthumous sale of his collection in 1919.

His grave is located in the Montmartre Cemetery.

== Work ==
Henri Michel-Lévy met regularly with French impressionists, in particular Edgar Degas, Édouard Manet and Eugène Boudin. He was a portraitist and often painted subjects going about their usual business, a common thread in Impressionist painting. His painting of Eugène Boudin (1880) shows the famous painter sketching cows in the fields near Deauville. His subjects are not professionals but people in his social circle, like the wife of his friend, Edgar Degas, or his own family.

From 1868 to 1914, Michel-Lévy exhibited at the Salon in Paris, where he was awarded honorable mention in 1880 and a third-class medal in 1881. He won a bronze medal at the Exposition Universelle of 1889.

In 1878, he was painted by Edgar Degas in his atelier; the work was presented at the fourth Impressionist exhibition in 1879. In the image, the painting to the right of Michel-Lévy was identified by Theodore Reff as The Regattas, a painting by Michel-Lévy that was photographically documented but the whereabouts of which are unknown; the painting revisits the theme of Manet's Le Déjeuner sur l’herbe. Michel-Lévy and Degas exchanged portraits of each other on that occasion, but soon after, Michel-Lévy sold Degas' painting, which drew Degas' disdainful comment: "You have done a despicable thing; you knew very well that I couldn't sell your portrait."

In 1885, he painted the portrait of Auguste Guerbois, owner of Café Guerbois, near Place de Clichy and Montmartre, where painters met. Art historian Ronald Pickvance suggested that Michel-Lévy may have been the painter of the portrait Madame Lévy, which is usually believed to have been painted by Édouard Manet.

As a landscape painter, Henri Michel-Lévy focused on peasant life, away from the romantic views of the time, but a large portion of his exterior paintings dealt with middle-class life of the 19th century. An example is Le Pouligen, la plage at Museum Baron Martin, Gray, France, in a style reminiscent of Boudin's work.

== In museums ==
- Le Peintre Eugène Boudin peignant des animaux dans la prairie de Deauville (1880), oil on canvas, 22 x 27 cm, Museum of modern art André Malraux - MuMa, Le Havre, France
- Auguste Guerbois (1885), oil on canvas, 46 x 38 cm, Musée d'Orsay, Paris, France
- La route de la Révolte, le soir (c. 1900), Musée Carnavalet
- La Nourrice, oil on canvas, Museum of Fine Arts, Orléans, France
- Ville balnéaire normande (about 1900), oil on canvas, 54.5 x 65 cm, Montebello Villa, Trouville, France
- Le Pouligen, la plage, oil on canvas, Baron Martin Museum, Gray, France
- Bateaux sur la grève, Louvre
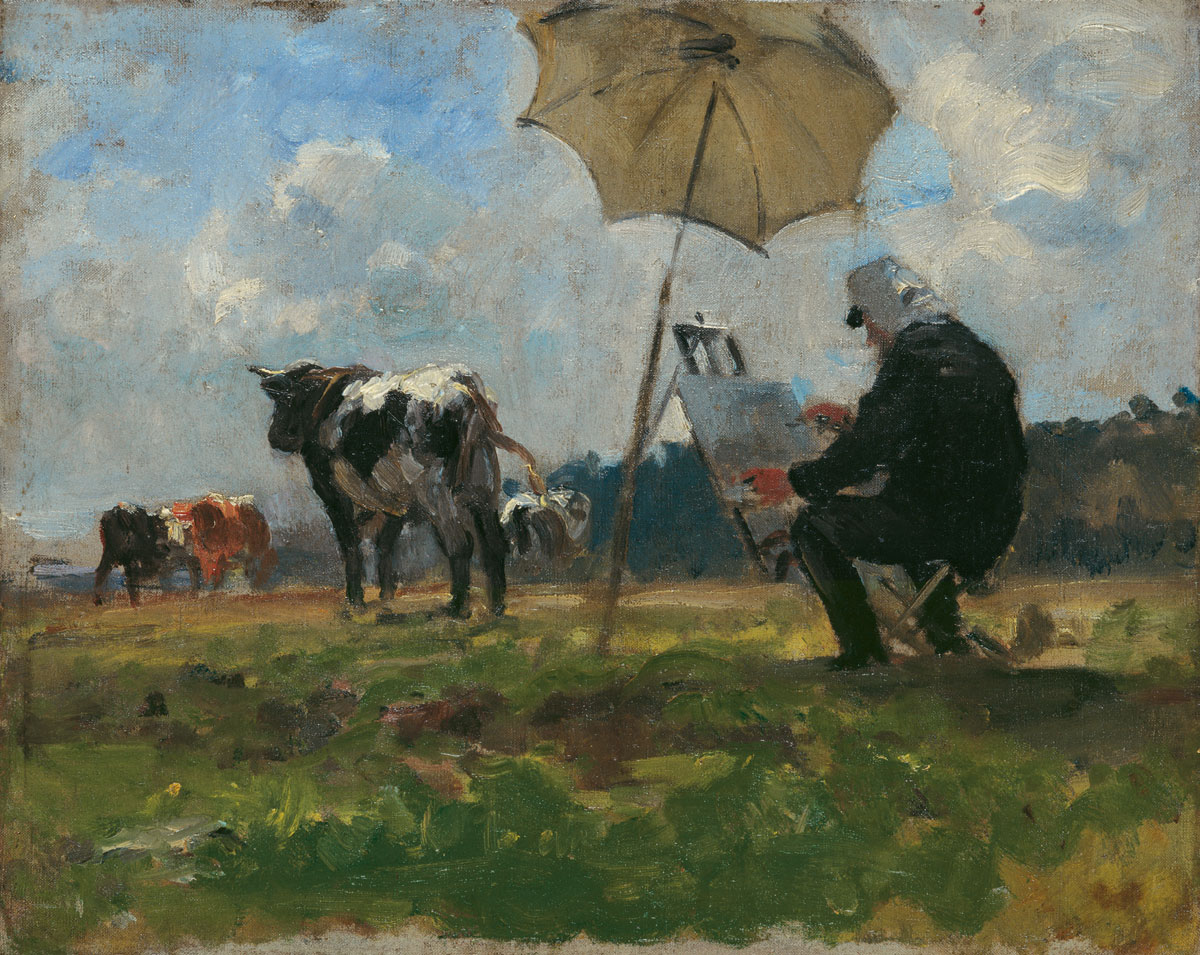
Le Peintre Eugène Boudin peignant des animaux dans la prairie de Deauville

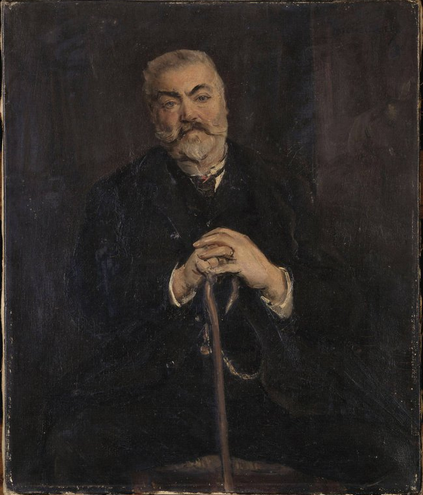
Auguste Guerbois

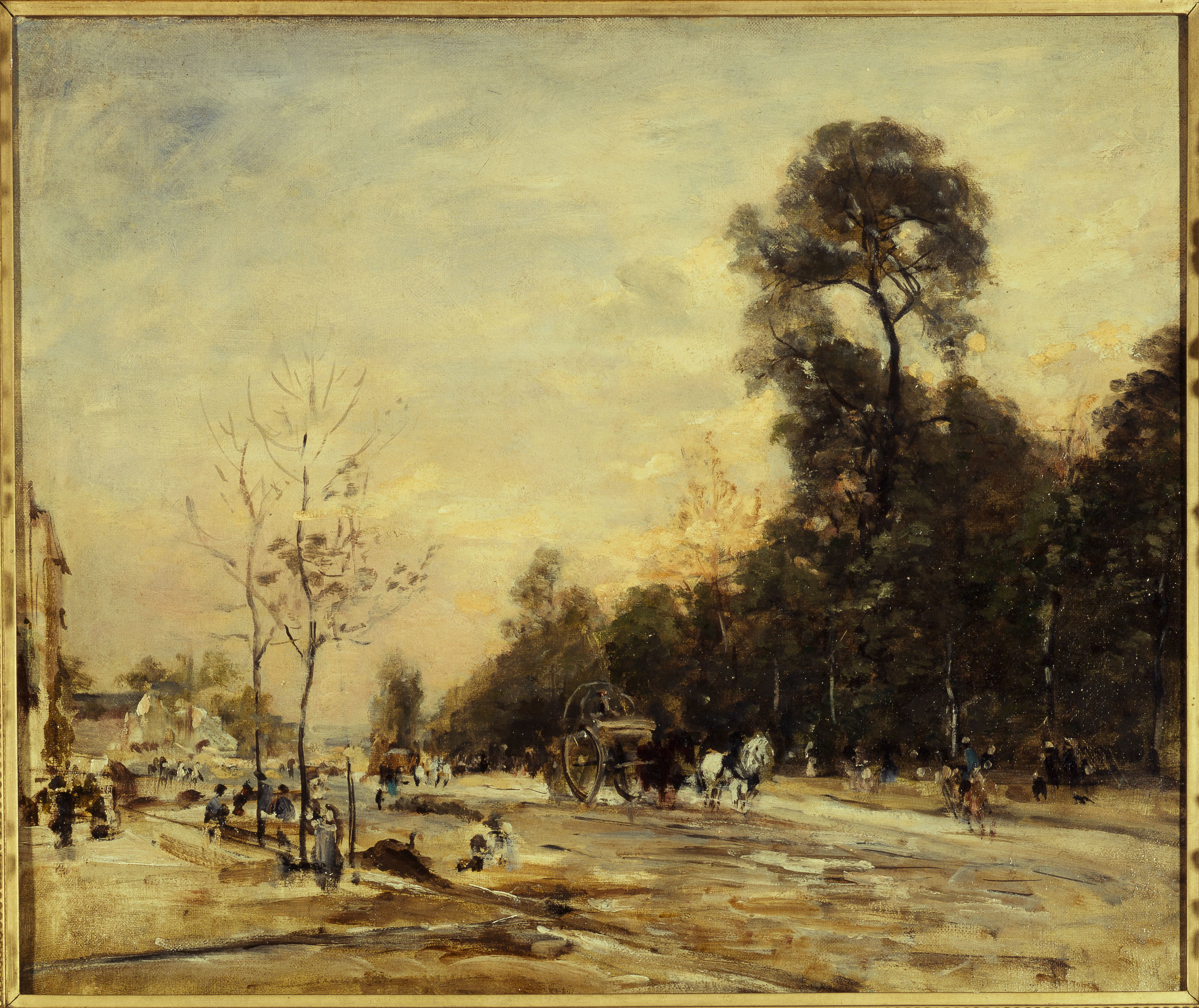
La route de la Révolte, le soir

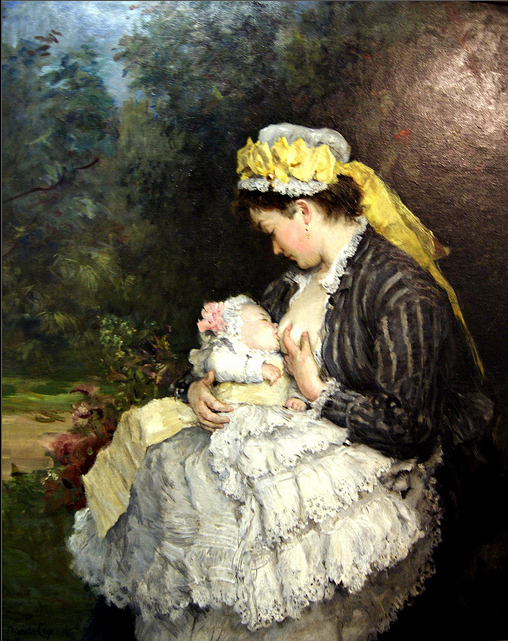
La Nourrice (the wet nurse)

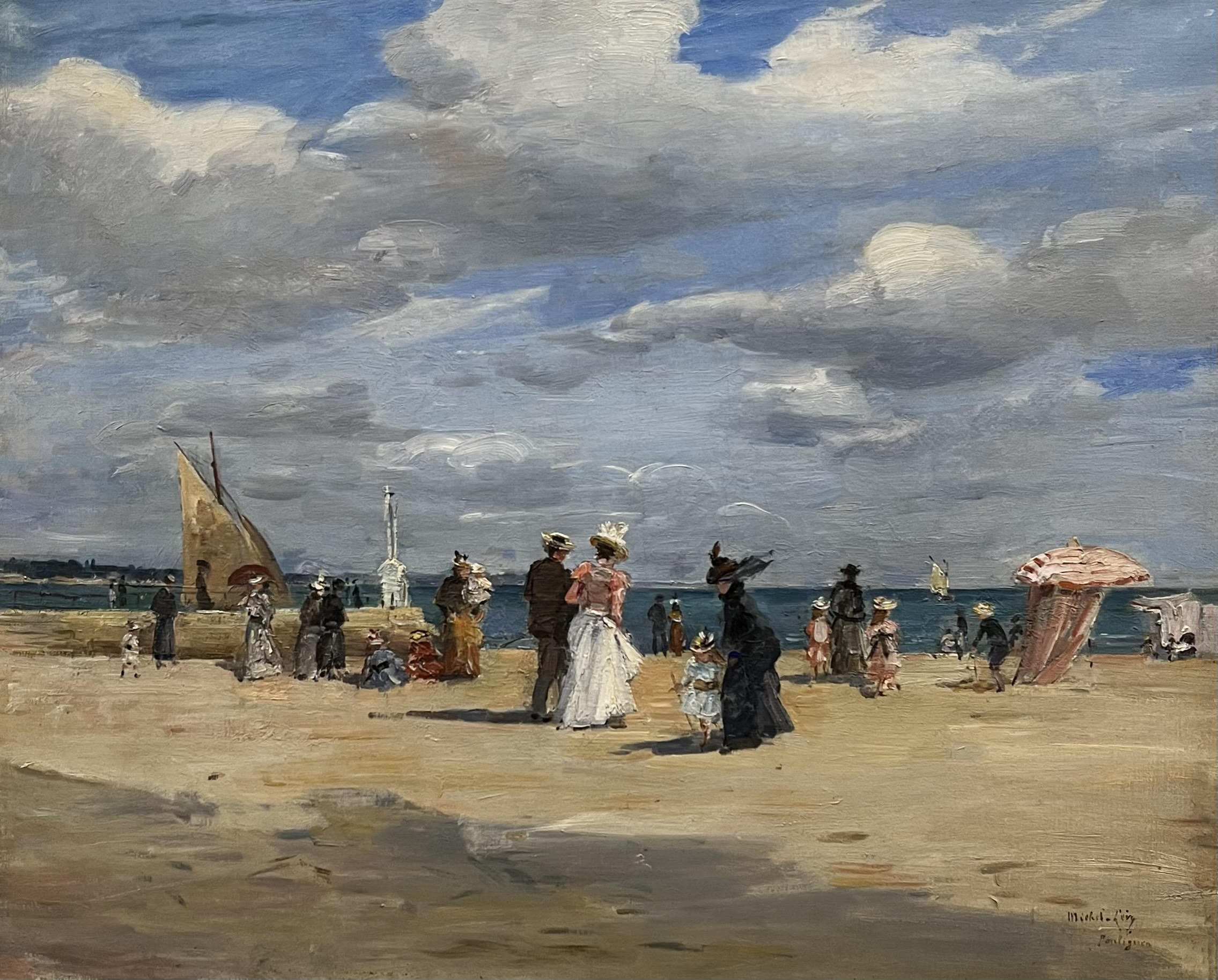
Le Pouliguen, la plage
