= Mound of Butter =

Painting by Antoine Vollon

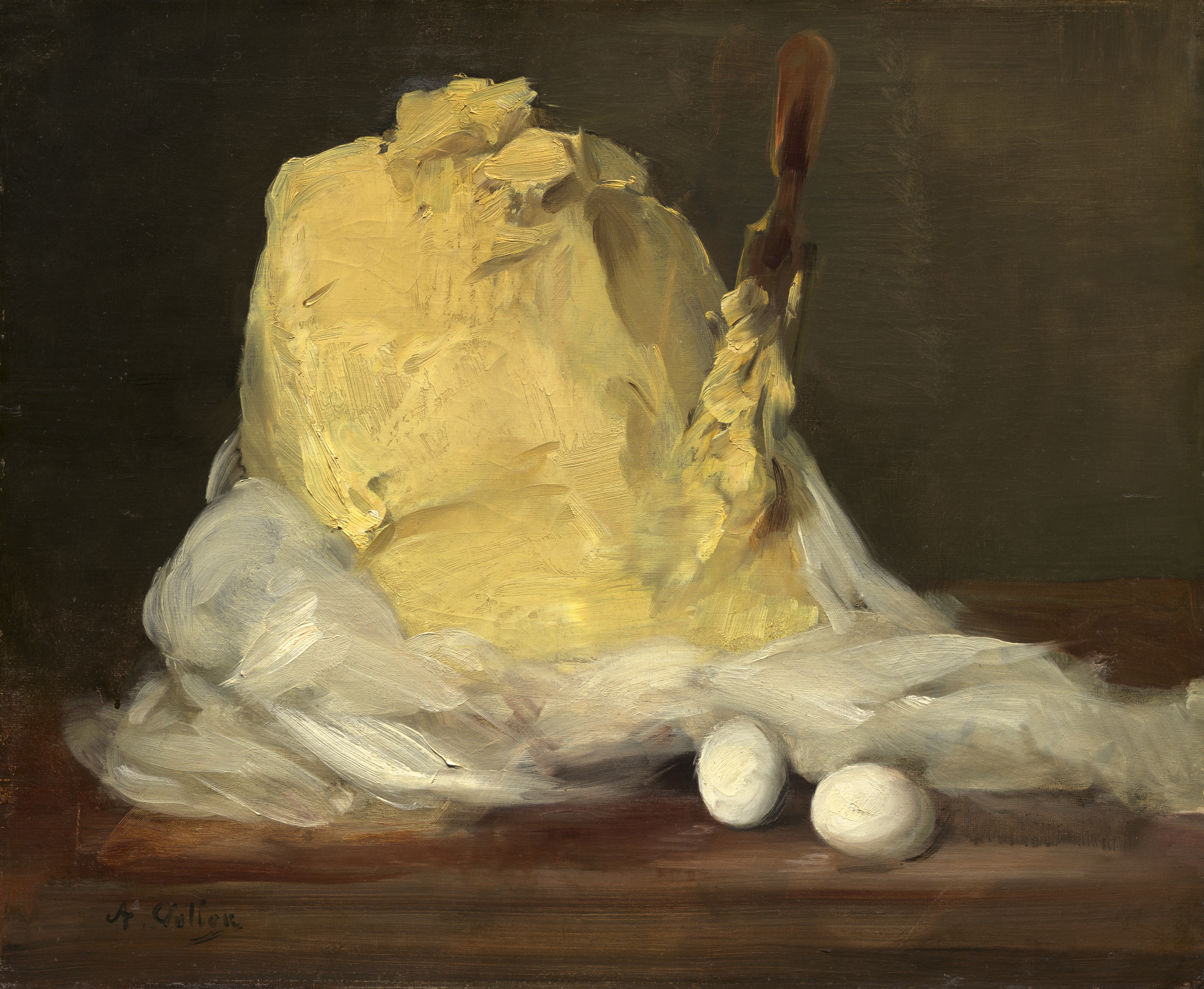
- Artist: Antoine Vollon
- Year: c. 1875–1885
- Medium: Oil on canvas
- Dimensions: 50.2 cm × 61 cm (19.8 in × 24 in)
- Location: National Gallery of Art, Washington, D.C.

Mound of Butter is a still life painting of a mound of butter, by the 19th-century French realist painter Antoine Vollon made between 1875 and 1885. The painting is in the National Gallery of Art in Washington, D.C., with The New York Times calling it one of "Washington’s Crown Jewels".

== Painter ==
Throughout his career, Vollon was best known as a painter of still lifes, this including his landscapes and figures. He was part of the French Realist movement, and in his lifetime achieved celebrity status, earning a number of prestigious awards such as the Legion of Honour, and declared "the Chardin of his day" (alluding to the French master of still life paintings, Jean-Baptiste-Siméon Chardin). In the late nineteenth century, Vollon's paintings maintained popularity, and thus many of his works are in private collections today. French writer Alexandre Dumas, fils and fellow American painter William Merritt Chase, for example, collected his various artworks.

Vollon was a member of the Académie des Beaux-Arts, and his works were present at the Paris Salon for over thirty years, together with other realist French painters like Charles-François Daubigny, Alexandre-Gabriel Decamps, Jean-Baptiste-Camille Corot, Henri Fantin-Latour and Eugène Boudin, but Vollon is not quite as celebrated or remembered today as his other French Realist colleagues such as Corot and Fantin-Latour.

== Painting ==
The painting is a great example of Vollon's still life art, depicting a mound of butter, coloured in rich, deep yellow (presumably made from the carotene of fresh plants that grazing cows commonly eat in barn fields). At the time when Antoine Vollon lived, it was normal to purchase hand churned butter from the farmer.

Typically, after milking, the cream is collected off the top of the milk, churned and the butter lumps are kneaded by hand or worked with a spatula to get rid of moisture, because high amounts of buttermilk would shorten its storage life. Butter was usually wrapped in cheesecloth, and stored in a cool place. In the painting, the butter mound's cloth falls loosely over a couple of eggs.

The painting also has thick marks layered on top of the artist's brush-work, to illustrate the marks left by the butter knife; or the wooden spatula, used in producing the butter. Kitchen scenes, food preparation, and the depiction of everyday objects were normal subjects for still lifes in Vollon's time.
