= Jean-Baptiste Louvet de Couvray =

French writer and diplomat (1760–1797)

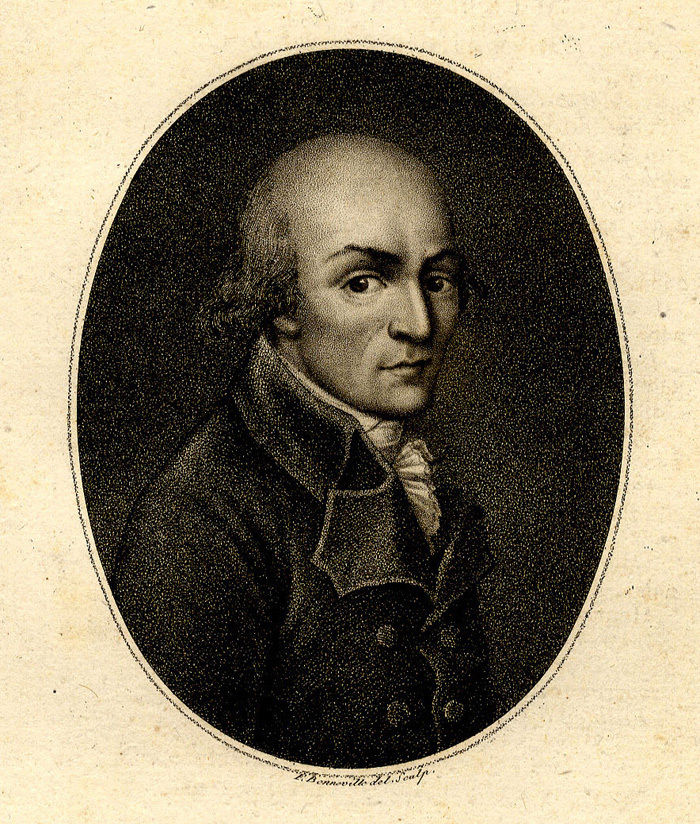
- Engraving by François Bonneville.

69th President of the National Convention
- In office 19 June – 4 July 1795
- Preceded by: Jean-Denis Lanjuinais
- Succeeded by: Louis-Gustave Doulcet de Pontécoulant

Personal details
- Born: 12 June 1760 Paris, Kingdom of France
- Died: 25 August 1797 (aged 37) Paris, French First Republic
- Party: Jacobins
- Occupation: Politician, Novelist, playwright, journalist
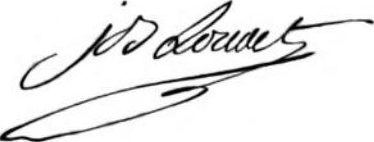
- Signature

Jean-Baptiste Louvet de Couvray (French pronunciation: [ʒɑ̃ batist luvɛ də kuvʁɛ]; 12 June 1760 – 25 August 1797) was a French novelist, playwright and journalist.

== Life ==
=== Early life and literary works ===
Louvet was born in Paris as the son of a stationer and became a bookseller's clerk. He first attracted attention with the first part of his novel Les Amours du Chevalier de Faublas (Paris, 1787; English translation illustrated by etchings by Louis Monzies in 1898), followed in 1788 by Six semaines de la vie du chevalier de Faublas and in 1790 by La Fin des amours du chevalier de Faublas. The heroine, Lodoiska, was based on the wife of a jeweller in the Palais Royal, with whom Louvet had an affair. She divorced her husband in 1792 and married Louvet in 1793. His second novel, Émilie de Varmont (1791), was intended to prove the utility and necessity of divorce and of the marriage of priests, questions raised by the French Revolution; all his works tended to advocate revolutionary ideals.

He attempted to have one of his unpublished plays, L'Anoblié conspirateur, performed at the Comédie-Française, and records that one of its managers, d'Orfeuil, listened to the reading of the first three acts impatiently, exclaiming at last: "I should need cannon in order to put that piece on the stage". A sort of farce at the expense of the army of the Royalist émigrés, La Grande Revue des armes noire et blanche, had, however, better success: it was on stage for twenty-five nights.

=== Early activism ===
Louvet was first brought into notice as a politician by his Paris justifié, in reply to a truly incendiary pamphlet in which Jean Joseph Mounier, after the removal of King Louis XVI from the Palace of Versailles to Paris in October 1789, had attacked the capital (which was still relatively peaceful), and argued that the court should be established elsewhere. This led to Louvet's election to the Jacobin Club, for which, as he wrote bitterly in his Memoirs, the qualifications were then a genuine civisme and some talent.

A self-styled philosophe and radical revolutionary, Louvet subsequently campaigned against despotism and reaction, which he identified with the moderate constitutional monarchy advocated by the Marquis de la Fayette, the Abbé Maury, and other disciples of Niccolò Machiavelli.

=== Deputy and Girondist ===
On 25 December 1791 he presented at the tribune of the Legislative Assembly his Petition contre les princes, which would have major influence during the First French Empire. Elected deputy to the Assembly for the département of Loiret, he gave his first speech in January 1792.

He attached himself to the Girondists, whose vague deism, sentimental humanitarianism and ardent republicanism he fully shared, and from March to November 1792 he published, at Jean Marie Roland's expense, a bi-weekly journal-affiche, of which the title, La Sentinelle, proclaimed its mission to open all of Europe to the Enlightenment at a time when, after the Habsburg declaration of war on France and the outbreak of the French Revolutionary Wars, a schism between the king and his subjects had become obvious.

On 10 August (the effective fall of the Monarchy), Louvet became editor of the Journal des Débats and, both as a journalist and deputy in the National Convention, made himself conspicuous by his attacks on Maximilien Robespierre, Jean-Paul Marat and the other Montagnards, whom he later claimed he would have succeeded in bringing to justice after the September Massacres were it not for the poor support he received from the Girondist leaders. On 29 October he accused Robespierre of creating a personality cult, governing the Paris "Conseil General" and paying the "Septembriseurs". R. Scurr considered that Robespierre was taken by surprise by the accusations while the writer of the Britannica article on Louvet considered Louvet's words along with his claims that Robespierre was a “royalist,” Marat “the principal agent of England,” the Montagnards Orleanists in masquerade to have beenn "ill-balanced invective contributed to their [the Girondist leaders] ruin and his own". Robespierre had to be defended by Danton. Commenting on the control that Robespierre ensured in Paris 1792 French National Convention election in which many candidates were disqualified Louvet said "Almost always at the moment despotism is overthrown agitators appear fomenting anarchy to oppress and tyrannize in their turn".

His courageous attitude at the king's trial, when he supported the appeal to the people over the outright death penalty, added to hostility towards his party. Nonetheless, he defended the Girondists to the last moment, displaying an incriminating courage. After the crisis of 31 May 1793, when François Hanriot and the sans-culottes stormed the convention, he joined his defeated faction in their flight from Paris. His wife Lodoiska, who had actively cooperated in his campaigns, was also placed in danger by the developments.

=== Thermidor and Directory ===
After the onset of the Thermidorian Reaction and the fall of Robespierre (27 July 1794), he was recalled to the convention, when he was instrumental in bringing Jean-Baptiste Carrier and the others responsible for the drownings at Nantes to justice. An increasingly influential figure, he went on to hold a series of important positions: he was elected to the Committee of the Constitution, served as president of the National Convention, and became a member of the Committee of Public Safety — the overgrown powers of which he had in earlier years protested against.

His conflict with the Montagnards had not made him reactionary: he attacked the Jeunesse dorée, and was regarded by many as a pillar of Jacobinism. La Sentinelle reappeared, under his auspices, preaching union among republicans. Under the Directory (1795) he was elected a member of the Council of Five Hundred, of which he was secretary, and also a member of the Institut de France.

Meanwhile, he had returned to his trade and set up a bookseller's shop in the Palais Royal. But, in spite of the fact that he had once more denounced the Jacobins in La Sentinelle, he had come to be seen as a major enemy by the Jeunesse dorée. His shop was attacked by the young men with cries of À bas la Loupe, à bas la belle Ledoiska, à bas les gardes du corps de Louvet! ("Down with the She-Wolf, down with beautiful Ledoiska, down with Louvet's bodyguards!"); he and his wife were insulted in the streets and the theatres: À bas les Louvets et les Louvetants! ("Down with the Louvets and the Louvetants!" – a reference to his guards, based on the antiquated senses of the verb louveter), and he was forced to leave Paris. The Directory appointed him to the consulship at Palermo, in the Kingdom of Naples, but he died before taking up his post.

== Louvet's Memoirs ==
In 1795 Louvet published a portion of his Memoirs under the title of Quelques notices pour l'histoire et le récit de mes perils depuis le 31 mai 1793. They were mainly written in the various hiding-places in which Louvet took refuge, and they give a vivid picture of the sufferings of the exiled Girondists. They form a major document for the study of the psychology of the Revolution, as they give insight into the Louvet's own states of mind and political choices. The first complete edition of the Mémoires de Louvet de Couvray, edited with preface, notes and tables, by François Victor Alphonse Aulard, were published in Paris in 1889.

== Bibliography ==
- Une année de la vie du Chevalier de Faublas, Londres et Paris, 1786, 4 vol. in-16
- Une année de la vie du chevalier de Faublas. Précédé d'une épître dédicatoire, Londres, et Paris, l'auteur, 1787, 5 tomes en 2 vol. in-12, 2e édition, Tome premier; Tome deuxieme; Tome troisieme; Tome quatrieme; Tome cinquieme, Londres et Paris, Bailly; l'auteur, 1790, 5 vol. in-12
- Six semaines de la vie du chevalier de Faublas, pour servir de suite à sa première année. Premiere partie; Seconde partie, Londres et Paris, Bailly, 1788, 2 vol. in-12, (2e édition, 1791, 2 vol. in-12)
- Paris justifié contre M. Mounier, par M. Louvet de Couvrai, Paris, Bailly, 1789, in-8°, 54 pages
- La Fin des amours du chevalier de Faublas. Tome premier; Seconde partie; Troisieme partie; Quatrieme partie; [ Tome cinquieme]; Sixieme partie, Londres et Paris, Bailly, 1790, 6 vol. in-12
- Vie et amours du chevalier de Faublas, seconde édition, revue, corrigée et augmentée, Londres et Paris, chez Bailly, 1790, 13 vol. in-18
- Pétition individuelle des citoyens de la section des Lombards, prononcée à la barre de l'Assemblée nationale, le 25 décembre 1791, par M. Jean-Baptiste Louvet; suivie de la réponse de M. le Président : imprimé par ordre de l'Assemblée nationale, Paris, Imprimerie nationale, 1791, in-8°, 8 pages
- Les Amours et les galanteries du chevalier de Faublas. Par M. Louvet de Couvray, Paris, chez l'auteur, 1791, 5 vol. in-18
- Vie et fin des amours du chevalier de Faublas. Tome premier; Deuxième partie; Quatrième partie; Cinquième partie, par M. Louvet de Couvray. Nouvelle édition corrigée et augmentée, Paris, 1793, in-12
- Émilie de Varmont ou Le divorce nécessaire et les amours du curé Sevin. Tome premier; Tome second; Tome troisieme, Paris, Bailly, 1791, 3 vol. in-12 (rééd. Londres, 1794, 3 vol. in-12); rééd., Geneviève Goubier et Pierre Hartmann éd., Presses universitaires de Provence, 2001, 196 p. ISBN 978-2-85399-477-4
- La Vérité sur la faction d'Orléans et la conspiration du 10 mars 1793, Paris, Veuve A.-J. Gorsas, an III, in-8 °, 55 pages
- Appel des victimes du 31 mai, aux Parisiens du 9 thermidor, Paris, Louvet, an III, in-8°, 16 pages
- Quelques notices pour l'histoire et le récit de mes périls depuis le 31 mai 1793. Jean-Baptiste Louvet, l'un des Représentans proscrits en 1793, Paris, Louvet, an III, in-8°, 190 pages (3e édition, an III, 3 vol. in-16)
- Les Amours du chevalier de Faublas, 3e édition revue par l'auteur, Paris, l'auteur, an VI, 4 vol. in-8°
- J.-B. Louvet, à ses collègues, Paris, Imprimerie de Marchant, 1796, in-8°, 8 pages
- Mémoires de J. B. Louvet. Tome premier; Tome second, Paris, a la Libraire Historique 1821
