= Victor Gustave Lhuillier =

French engraver and etcher

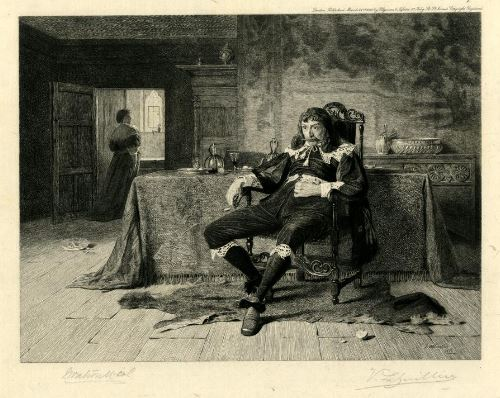
"When a Man Gets Married, His Troubles Begin" (1886), after John Watson Nicol (1856-1926)

Victor Gustave Lhuillier (19 April 1844 – July 1889) was a French engraver and etcher.

== Life and work ==
Born at Altkirch, Alsace, which was then in France, he studied art in Lyon and was a pupil of Léon Gaucherel (1816–1886).

In 1870, following the Franco-Prussian War, France ceded Alsace to Germany, and he opted to remain a French citizen.

His work was included in exhibitions of the Salon in Paris between 1879 and 1882 and of the Royal Academy in London from 1878 to 1888. For most of his career, he worked in England.

He is recorded in the 1881 United Kingdom census living in Elphinstone Terrace, Hastings, with his London-born wife Eulalie, aged 24, their three young daughters, Henriette, Louise, and Augustine, and their two-year-old son Louis. He was described as an "Engraver Artist" born in France.

In his Dictionnaire général des artistes de l'école française (1882), La Chavignerie listed some notable works by Lhuillier, all with titles in English, including "Lazy moments", "Valentine", "The waning of the honey-moon", and "Three jolly post-boys". He also gave an address for Lhuillier in Campton Street, Brunswick Square, Bloomsbury.
