= Antoine Vollon =

French painter (1833–1900)

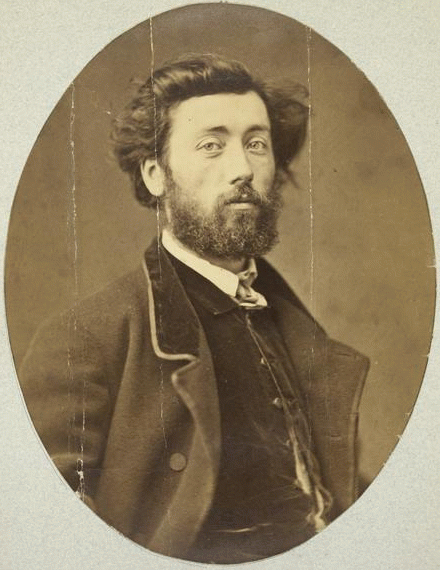
- Photograph of Vollon in 1858 by Pierre Petit
- Born: 23 April 1833; Lyon, France
- Died: 27 August 1900 (aged 67); Paris, France
- Known for: Painting

Antoine Vollon (23 April 1833 – 27 August 1900) was a French realist artist, best known as a painter of still lifes, landscapes, and figures. During his lifetime, Vollon was a successful celebrity, enjoyed an excellent reputation, and was called a "painter's painter." In 2004, New York's then-PaceWildenstein gallery suggested that his "place in the history of French painting has still not been properly assessed."

== Family and early years ==
Vollon was born the son of an ornamental craftsman in Lyon, France. He taught himself to paint. He began an apprenticeship to an engraver in metal, and studied under Jehan Georges Vibert at the École des Beaux-Arts in Lyon from 1850 to 1853 to become a printmaker. He then worked at decorating enamelled pans and stoves. In 1860 he and Marie-Fanny Boucher married and later had two children, Alexis and Marguerite.

== Paris and becoming a painter ==
In 1859 he moved to Paris, with the intention of becoming a painter. There he became a student of Théodule Ribot and was influenced by Dutch still life painters of the 17th century. He became friends with Alexandre Dumas, Jean-Baptiste Carpeaux, Honoré Daumier and Charles-François Daubigny. Vollon once described himself as a young artist "madly in love with painting".

== Figures and still lifes ==
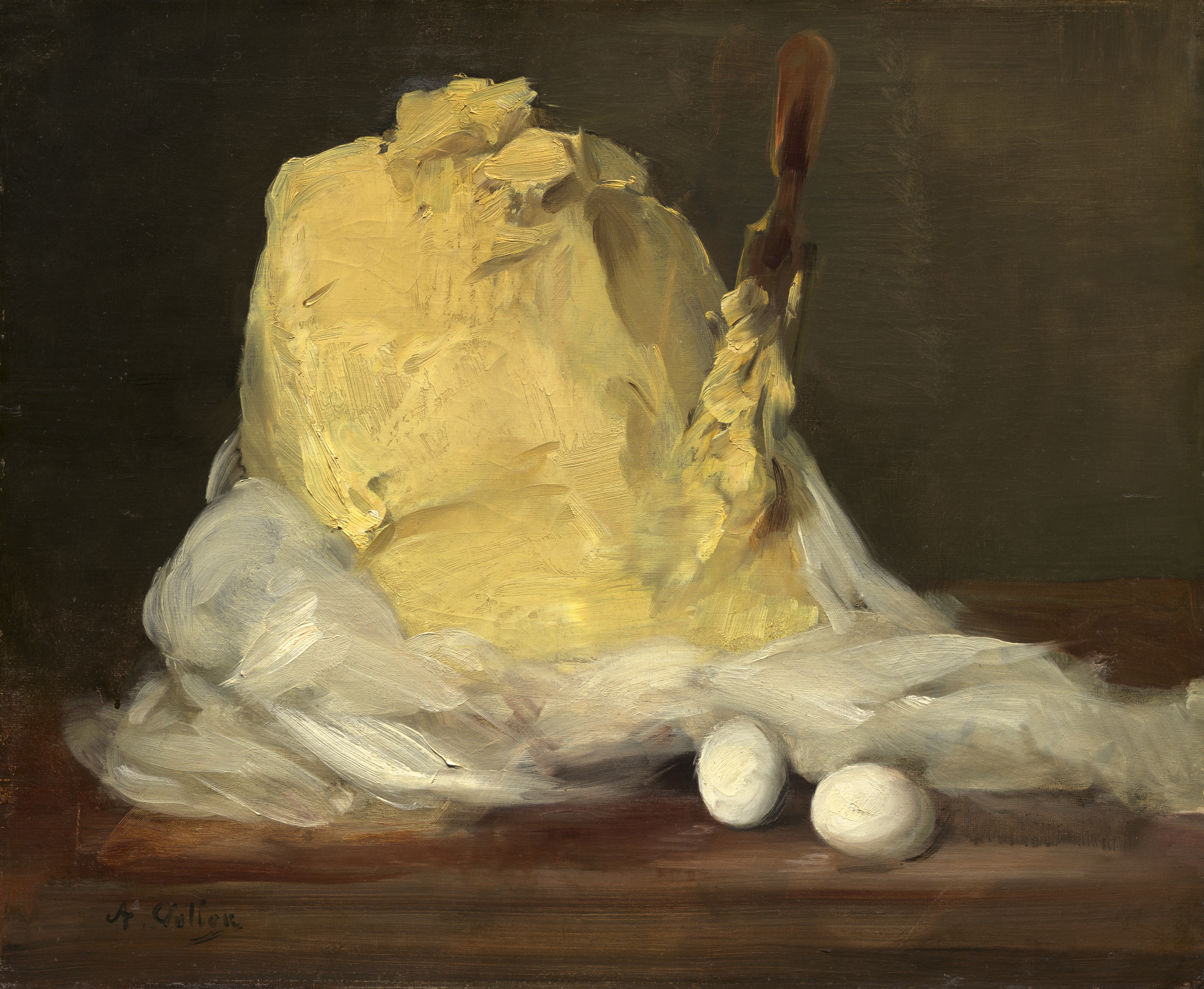
Mound of Butter (1875–85; National Gallery of Art) was said to look so real that it might have been painted with butter itself.

Vollon aspired to paint figures and not only still lifes which were the lowest acceptable genre for the Salon. He submitted a figure painting of a woman carrying a large basket on her back, Femme du Pollet à Dieppe (Seine-Inferieure), to the 1876 Salon, where it won first prize and received universally great reviews. However it was criticised by Édouard Manet, who unleashed a few words, in English: Bah! What is Vollon's Femme? A basket that walks (French: Bah! . . . qu'est-ce que la Femme de Vollon? un panier qui marche) which stigmatized it. According to Carol Forman Tabler, curator and professor of art who wrote her dissertation on Vollon, writing for Nineteenth-Century Art Worldwide:

"At a single blow, Manet's rapier wit exposed the still-life/figure paradox and Vollon was banished once again to an unshakable identity as a painter of still life."

== Later years and awards ==
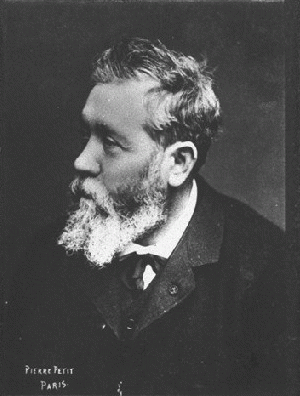
Photograph of Vollon in 1900 by Petit

Carol Forman Tabler wrote:

"Once Vollon began exhibiting at the Salon, he quickly gained recognition from the critics and the public at large, and, most importantly, from Second-Empire officialdom. He had learned how to play the political game that would earn him State patronage and enable him to win numerous awards...."

Tabler describes his ambition and the decades-long strategies Vollon used to secure a place in history. After one year in the Salon des Refusés in 1863, beginning in 1864 he exhibited his work at the Paris Salon. Vollon won a third-class medal in 1865, a second-class in 1868, and first-class in 1869. Vollon was a member of the Salon's jury for at least ten years starting in 1870.

Amongst his collectors Alexandre Dumas jr, Antoine Lumière, Auguste Pellerin, Norbert Pain, the stockbroker Theodore-Charles Gadala, docteur Marchand, Mme Carcano and the Earl of Salisbury (once the UK Secretary of Foreign Affairs) were the most publicly known.

Jean-Baptiste Olive's (1848-1936) still lifes were influenced by his works. Vollon also had students, among whom were Raymond Allègre (1857-1933), Joseph Garibaldi (1863-1941), Henri Michel-Lévy (1845-1914), Théo Mayan (1860-1936) and Gustave le Sénéchal de Kerdréoret (1840-1933).

He became a Chevalier of the Legion of Honor in 1870, and eight years later received the Officer's cross. He was elected to the Académie des Beaux-Arts in 1897. In 1900 he was awarded the Grand Prix at the Paris World's Fair.

In July of that same year Vollon suffered a stroke while painting at Versailles and later caught a fever. He died shortly thereafter, on 27 August 1900, at the age of 67. He is buried in Père Lachaise Cemetery, in the 20th arrondissement of Paris.

== Legacy ==
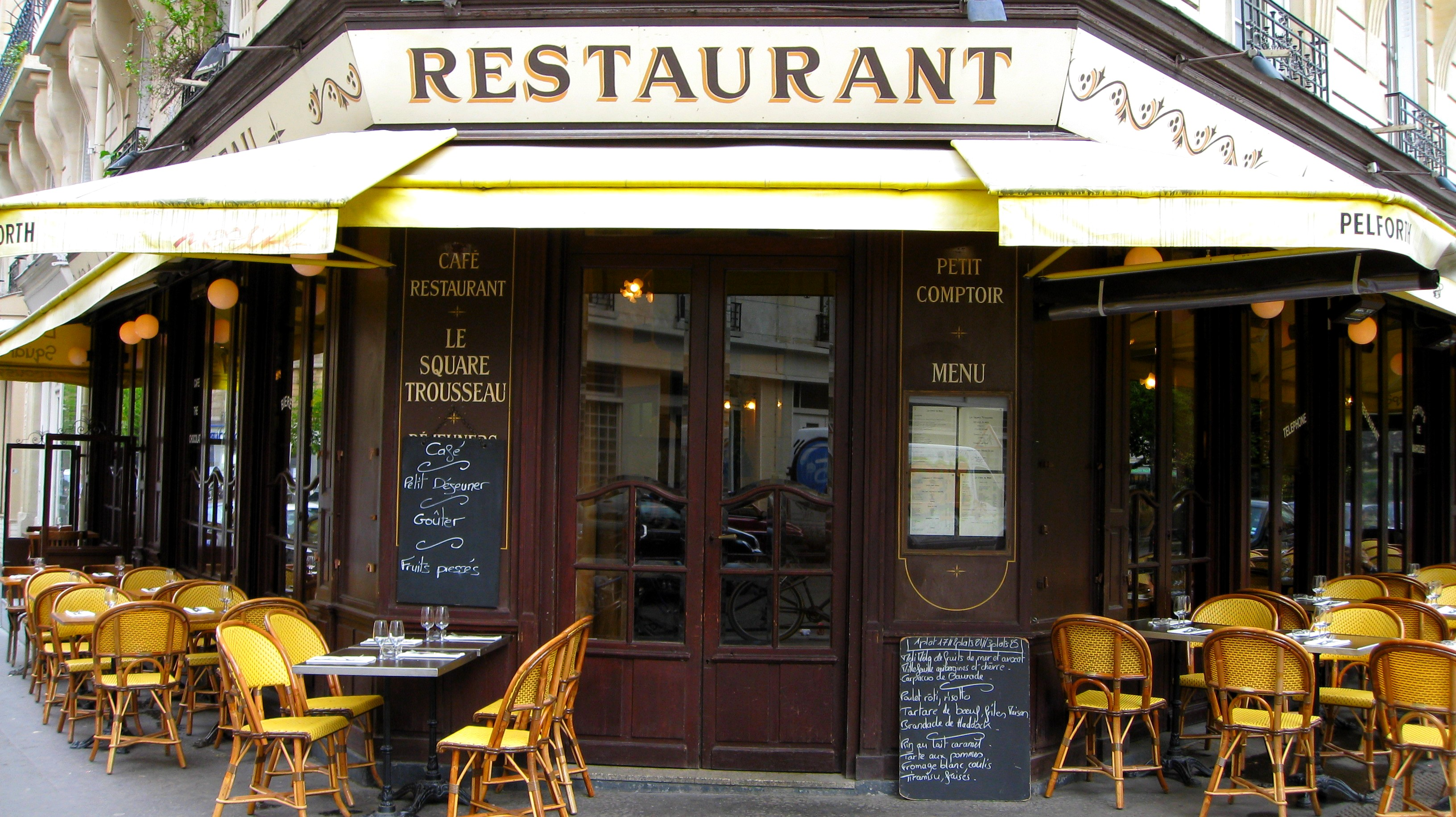
A restaurant on Rue Antoine Vollon in Paris

Wildenstein showed more than 70 works by Vollon in Manhattan in 2004. For The New York Times, a reviewer wrote, "Vollon smacks too much of other artists to be Truly Important, but his sensuous wallows in paint are well worth wider notice". But an earlier reviewer for the same newspaper quotes a critic writing in 1883, "He is, perhaps, the greatest painter living...."

His son Alexis Vollon (1865–1945) also became a painter.

Two streets in France are named for him: Rue Antoine Vollon in Bessancourt and in Paris, whilst an intersection with a fountain in Lyon is named Place Antoine Vollon.

== Gallery ==
Selected works

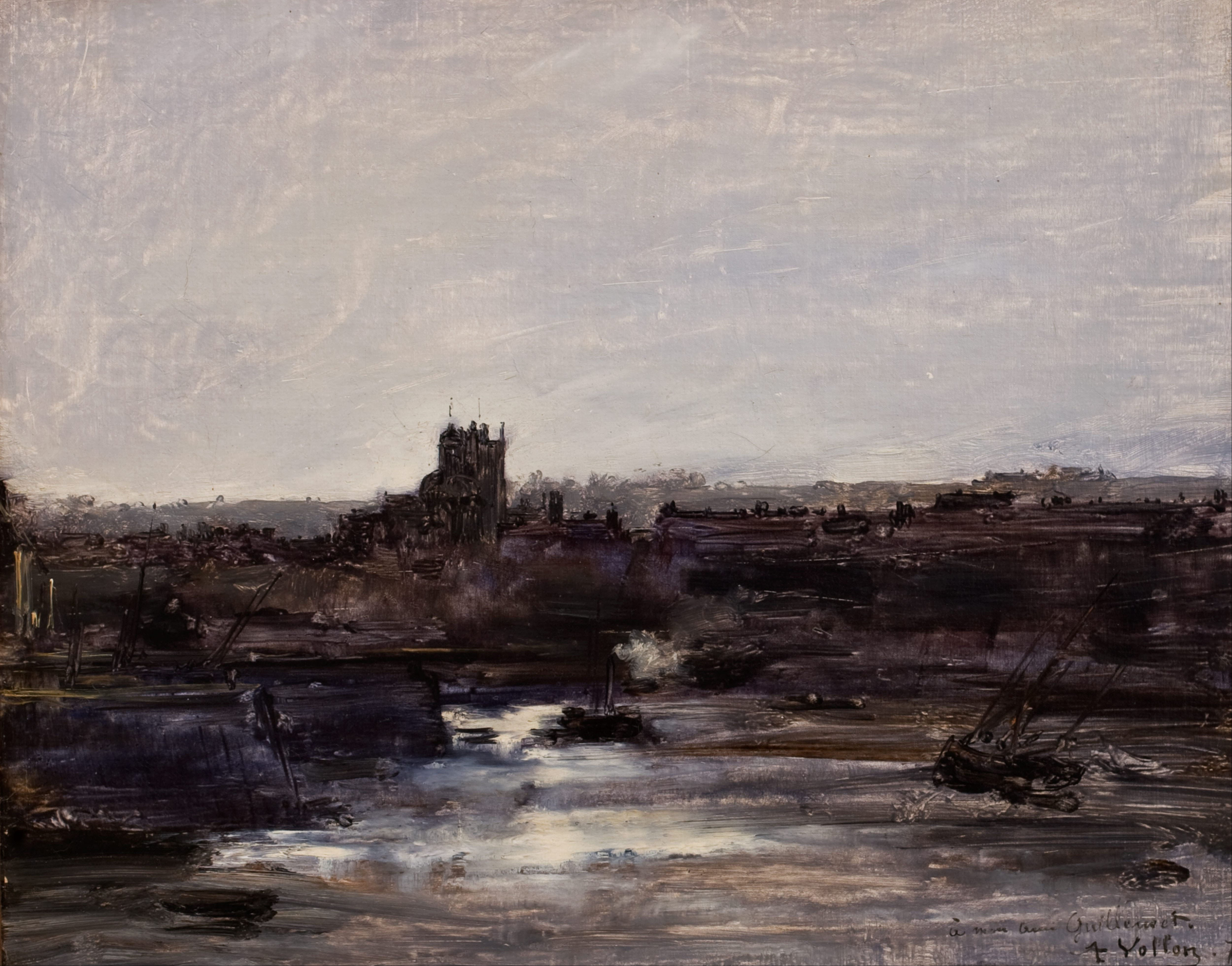
Dieppe, 1873

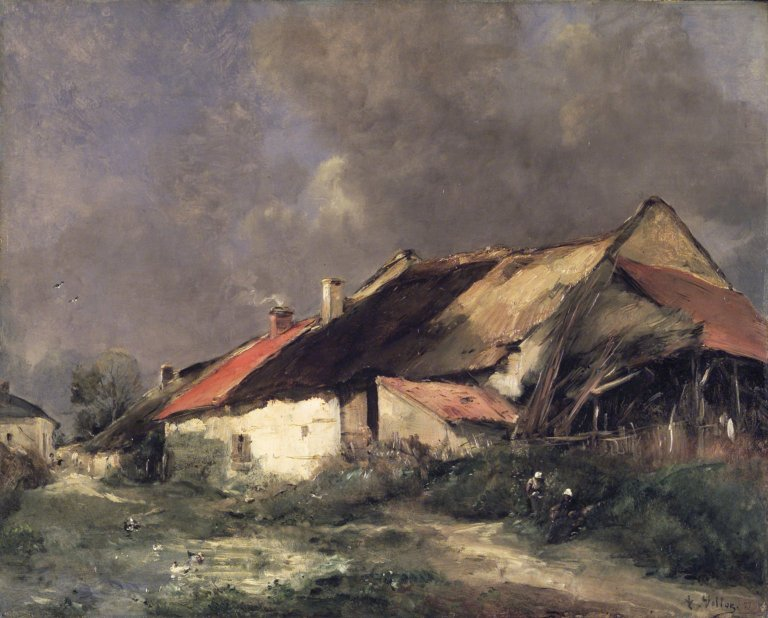
Vollon was also an accomplished painter of landscapes, here Brooklyn Museum's After the Storm (c. 1877)

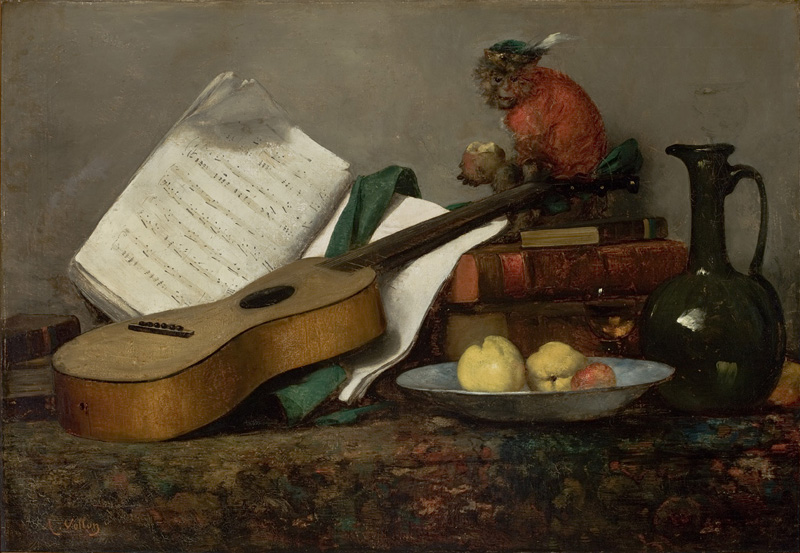
Vollon occasionally painted singeries (monkeys engaged in human activities).

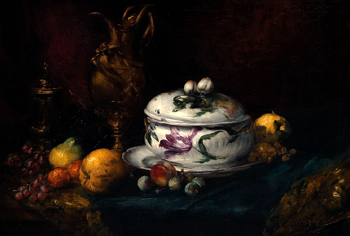
Still life

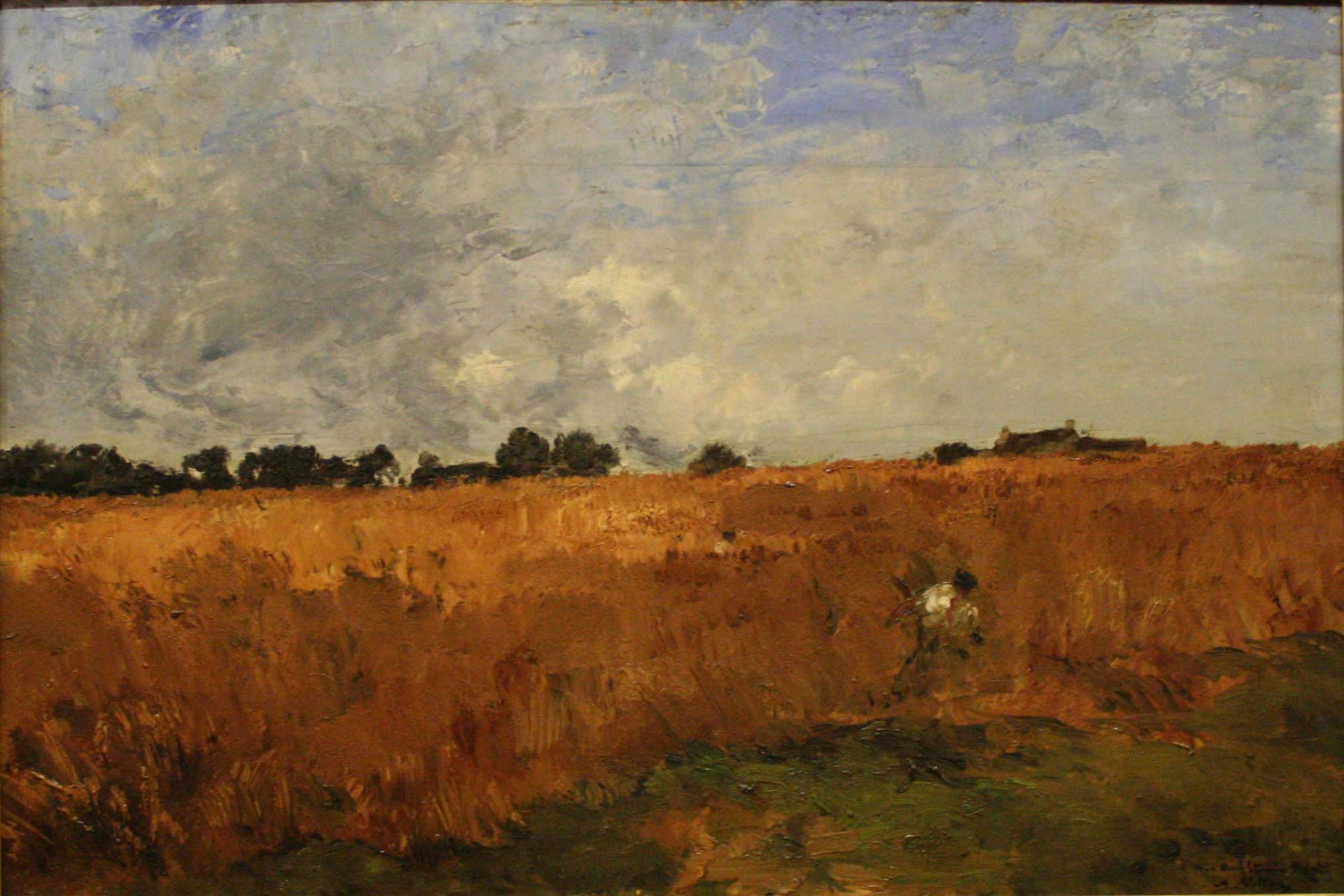
La moisson

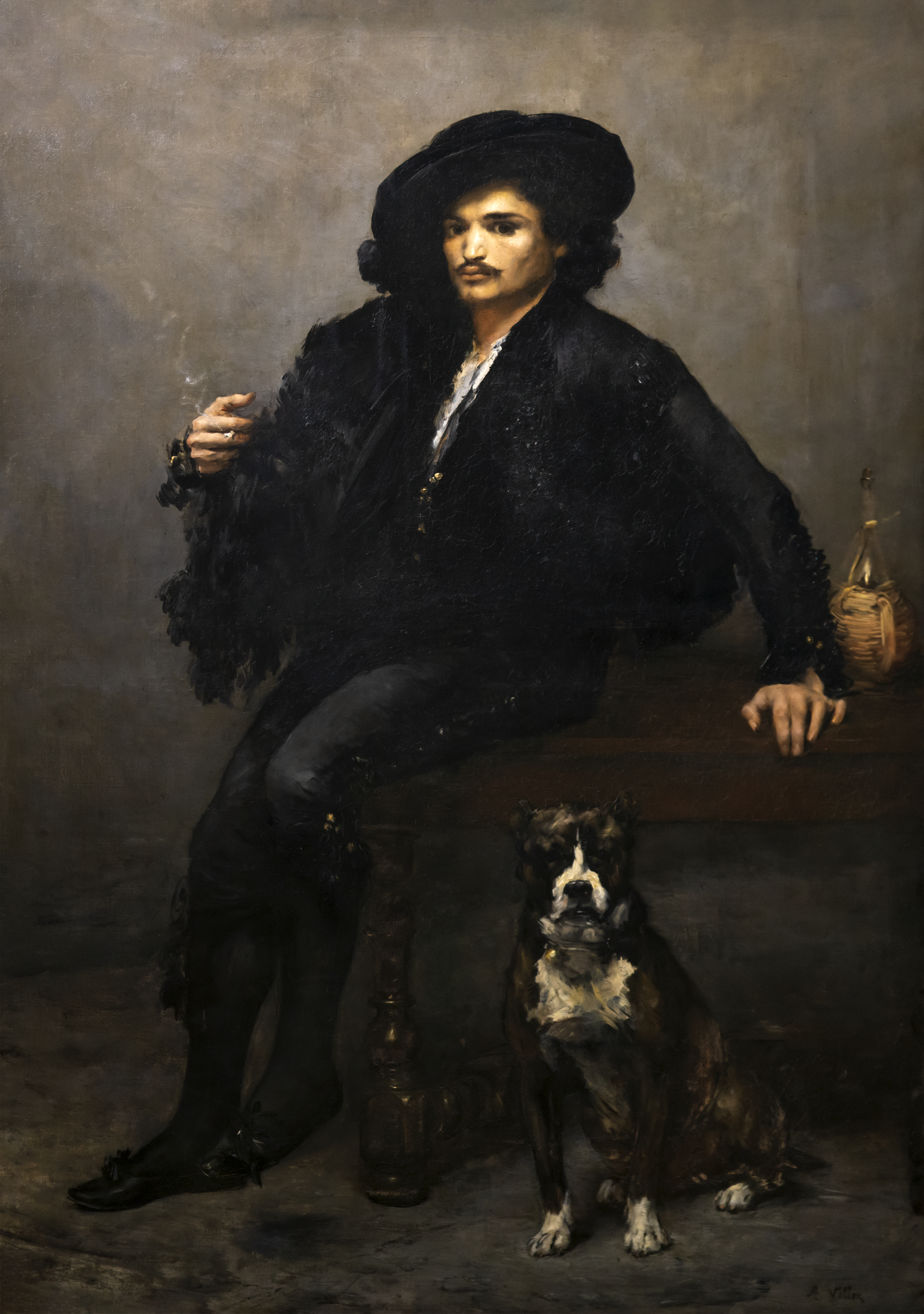
Espagnol, 1878
