= Edmond Ramus =

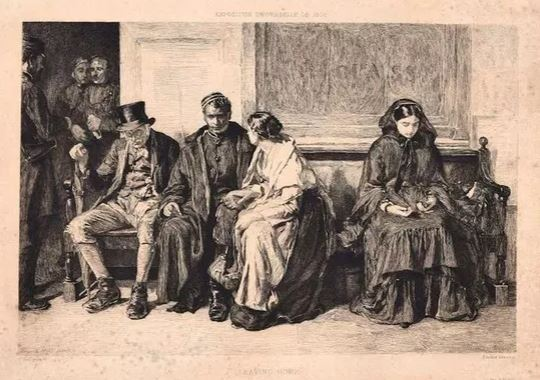
Leaving Home, after Frank Holl

Edmond Joseph Ramus (5 May 1822 – 1890) was a French etcher best known for his reproductions of paintings for art catalogues.

Ramus was born in Paris and first exhibited at the Paris Salon of 1847. He was a pupil of the etcher Léon Gaucherel. He was awarded a bronze medal in 1881. He is listed as one of the contributors of eaux-fortes in the catalogue of objects for the palais de San Donato in 1880. He worked extensively for the French magazine L'Art. Some of his most familiar works are the portraits of Napoléon III, the Empress Eugénie, and Léon Gambetta.
