= Félix-Joseph Barrias =

French painter (1822–1907)

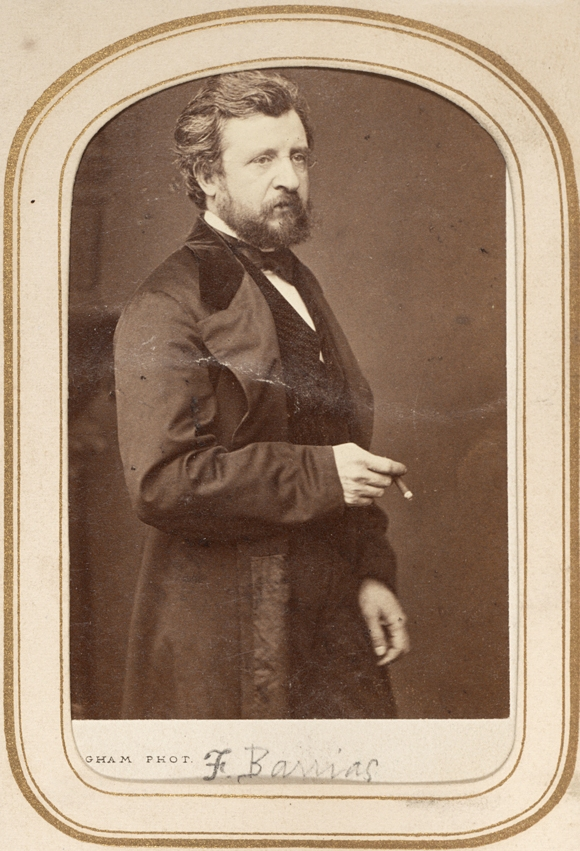
- Carte de visite portrait of the artist
- Born: 13 September 1822; Paris, France
- Died: 24 January 1907 (aged 84); Paris, France
- Occupation: Painter

Félix-Joseph Barrias (French: [feliks ʒozɛf baʁjas]; 13 September 1822 – 24 January 1907) was a French painter. He was well known in his day for his paintings of religious, historical or mythical subjects, but has now been largely forgotten. Artists who trained in his studio and went on to achieve fame include Edgar Degas, Gustave Achille Guillaumet and Henri Pille.

== Early years ==
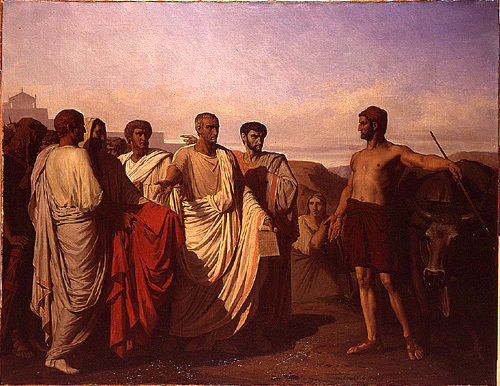
Cincinnatus receiving the deputies of the Senate (1844)

Félix-Joseph Barrias was born on 13 September 1822 in Paris. His brother was Louis-Ernest Barrias (1841–1905), who became a well-known sculptor. His father was a painter on porcelain, and taught Félix-Joseph Barrias, who proved to be an adept pupil and was able to earn his own living by the age of 16.

Félix-Joseph Barrias then studied under Léon Cogniet. He won the Prix de Rome in 1844 with his picture of Cincinnatus Receiving the Deputies of the Senate. This let him travel to Italy for further studies. In 1847 he exhibited at the Salon for the first time with his Young Girl Carrying Flowers and Roman Spinner. Barrias received a third class medal in 1847 and a second class medal in 1851 for his The Exiles of Tiberius (Louvre). At the Exposition Universelle (1855) he received a second class medal for his painting Jubilee Year of 1300 in Rome.

== Career ==
Barrias made many paintings on religious, historical or mythical subjects. He also made frescoes for the Church of Saint-Eustache, Paris, the Grand Hôtel du Louvre, and the Chapel of Saint Genevieve in the church of Sainte-Trinité, Paris. He was commissioned in the 1860s to contribute an illustration to an album of works on prayer compiled by William Thompson Walters, as were other noted painters of the day such as William-Adolphe Bouguereau, Jean-Léon Gérôme and James Tissot.

A large painting by Barrias was exhibited at the 1862 International Exhibition in London, depicting the French army landing in the Crimea. In 1868 Barrias painted The Legend of the Golden Fleece on the ceiling of Drapers' Hall, London. Barrias created mural works for the Paris Opera of Charles Garnier, and in the 1880s painted a decoration for the Mercers' Hall in London. Barrias exhibited portraits at the Salons of 1879, 1880 and 1881. He made lithograph illustrations for Didot's editions of Virgil and Horace.

Barrias taught Edgar Degas (1834–1917) in 1853. Other pupils included Gustave Achille Guillaumet (1840–1884), Fernand Pelez (1848–1913), Étienne-Prosper Berne-Bellecour (1838–1910), Jehan Georges Vibert (1840–1902), Henri Pille (1844–1897), Henri Michel-Lévy (1844–1914), Jean-Jacques Scherrer (1855–1916), and Jules Tavernier (1844–1889). Barrias was made a chevalier of the Legion of Honour on 12 July 1859, and an officer on 3 February 1897. He died on 24 January 1907 at the age of 84.

== Reception ==
The contemporary critic Roger Ballou said the works of Barrias were "always distinguished by a severe execution, a happy imagination, and a graceful conception of the whole effect. A painter of style, Felix Barrias has neither the solemnity nor the coldness of those who usually claim this title; very careful of the dignity of his art in these times of easy painting, he has never made a compromise with the taste of the day, and for this reason, in every essay on decorative art his name is written in advance." However, his work is now largely forgotten.

== Selected works ==
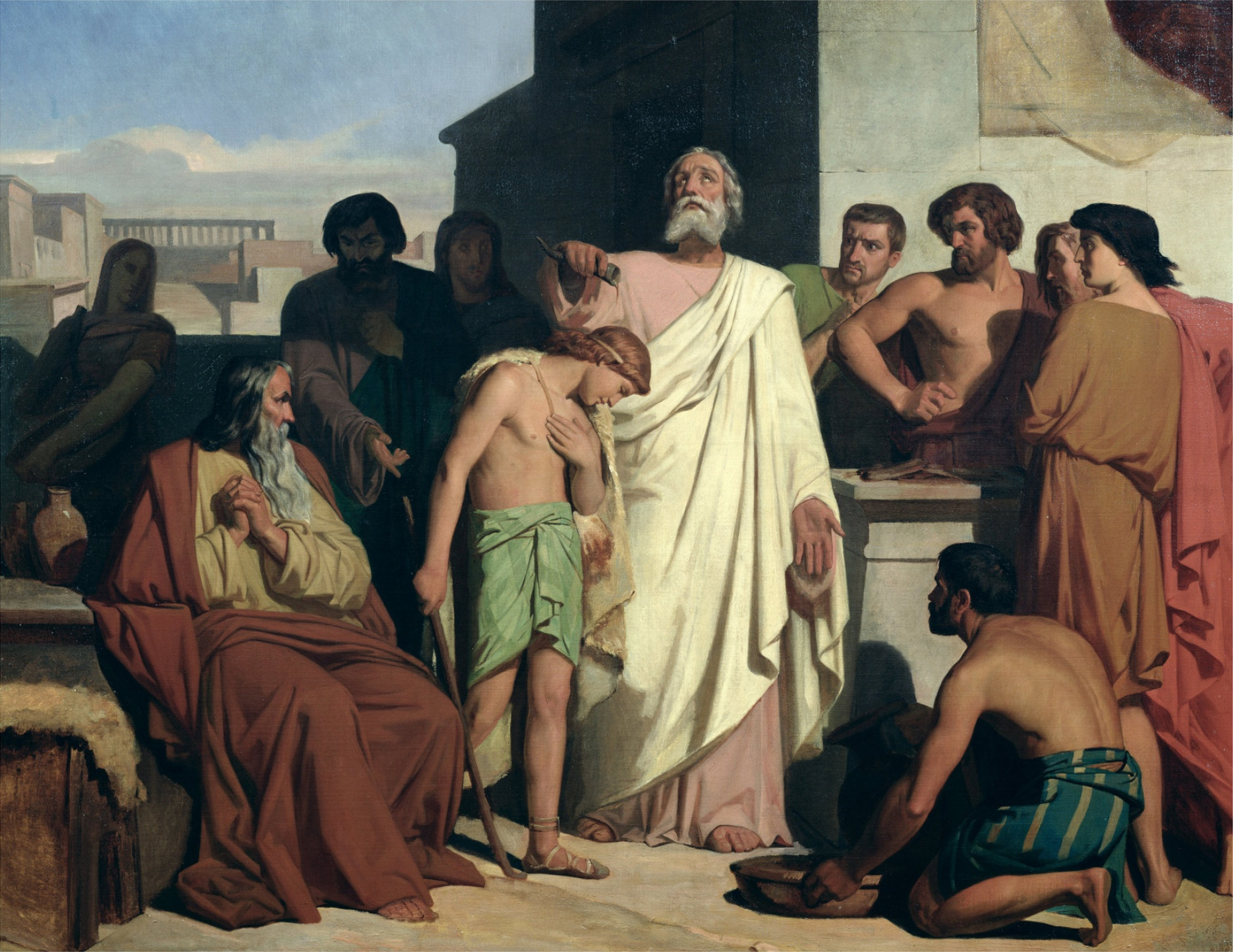
Anointing of David by Samuel (1842)

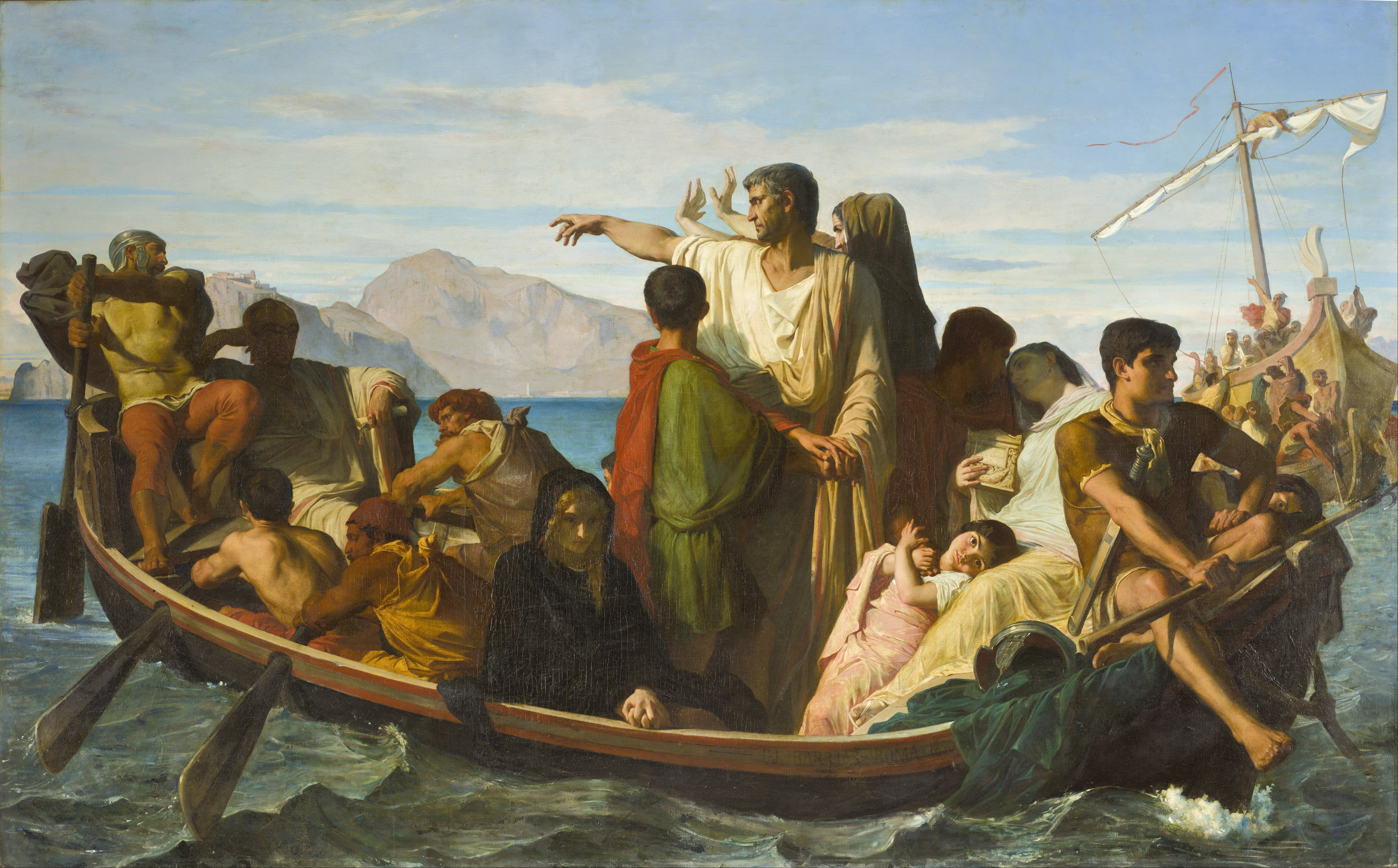
The Exiles of Tiberius (1850)

- Anointing of David by Samuel (1842) – Petit Palais, Paris
- Cincinnatus Receiving the Deputies of the Senate (1844)
- Sappho d'Ereze (1845) A photograph was published in A. Cipollini's 1890 Saffo, but the original has been lost.
- Young Girl Carrying Flowers (1847)
- A Gaul and His Daughter Imprisoned in Rome (1847)
- Roman Spinner (1847)
- The Exiles of Tiberius (1850) – purchased for the Gallery of the Luxembourg
- Michel Angelo in the Sistine Chapel (1857)
- Easter Communion (1861)
- Picardy (1863) – allegorical picture for the grand stairway of the Museum of Amiens
- The Repose (1866)
- Electra at the Tomb of her Father (1875)
- L'Homme est en mer! (1875) - subject from Victor Hugo
- Eve (1877)
- The Fairy of the Pearls (1878)
- Mont-Dore in the time of Augustus (1882)
- Death of Chopin (1885) The painting is in the National Museum, Kraków.
- The Triumph of Venus (1886)
- Camille Desmoulins in the Palais Royal (1888)
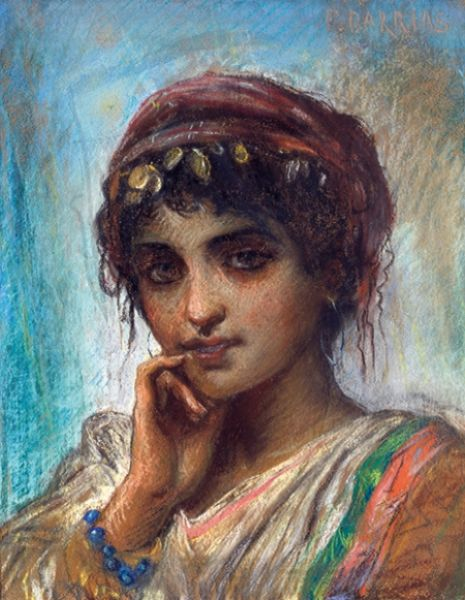
Oriental woman (undated)

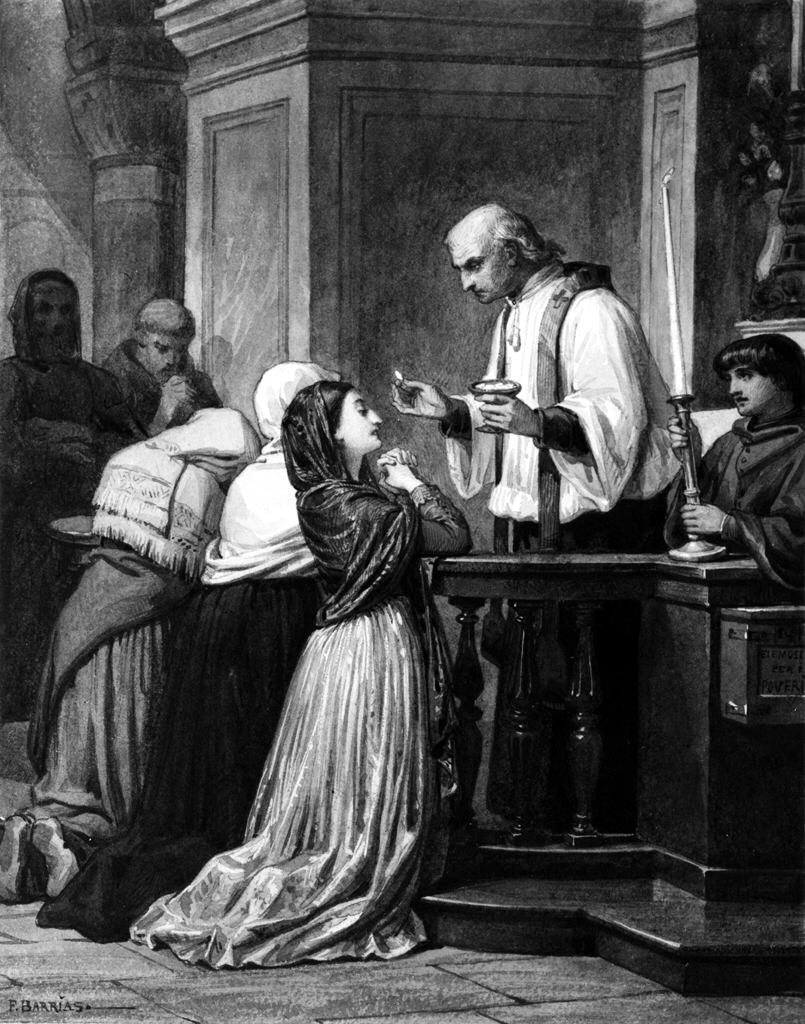
Woman Receiving the Eucharist (undated)

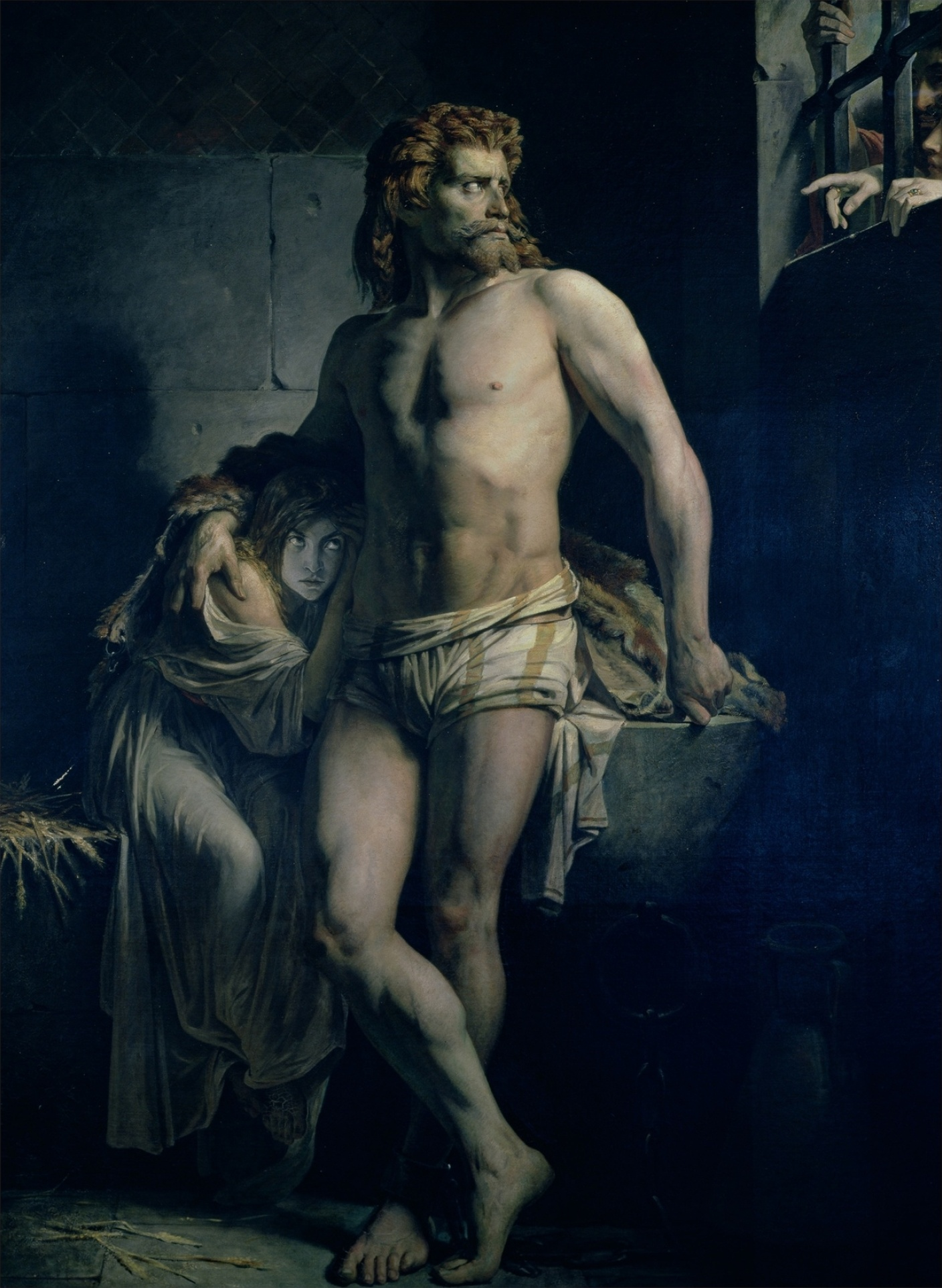
A Gaul and His Daughter Imprisoned in Rome (1847)

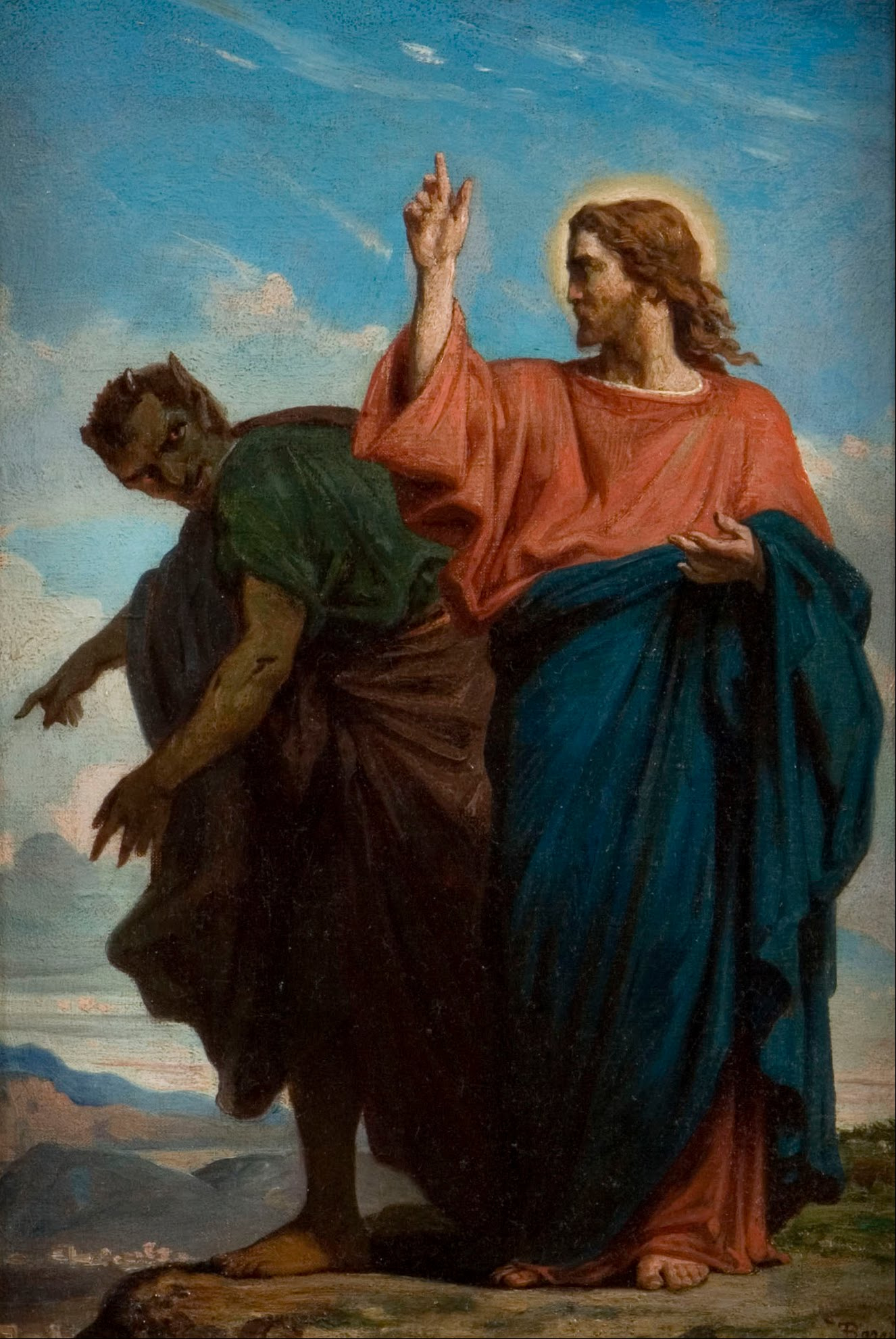
The Temptation of Christ by the Devil (1860), Philbrook Museum of Art
