= Henri Pille =

French painter and illustrator

Charles Henri Pille
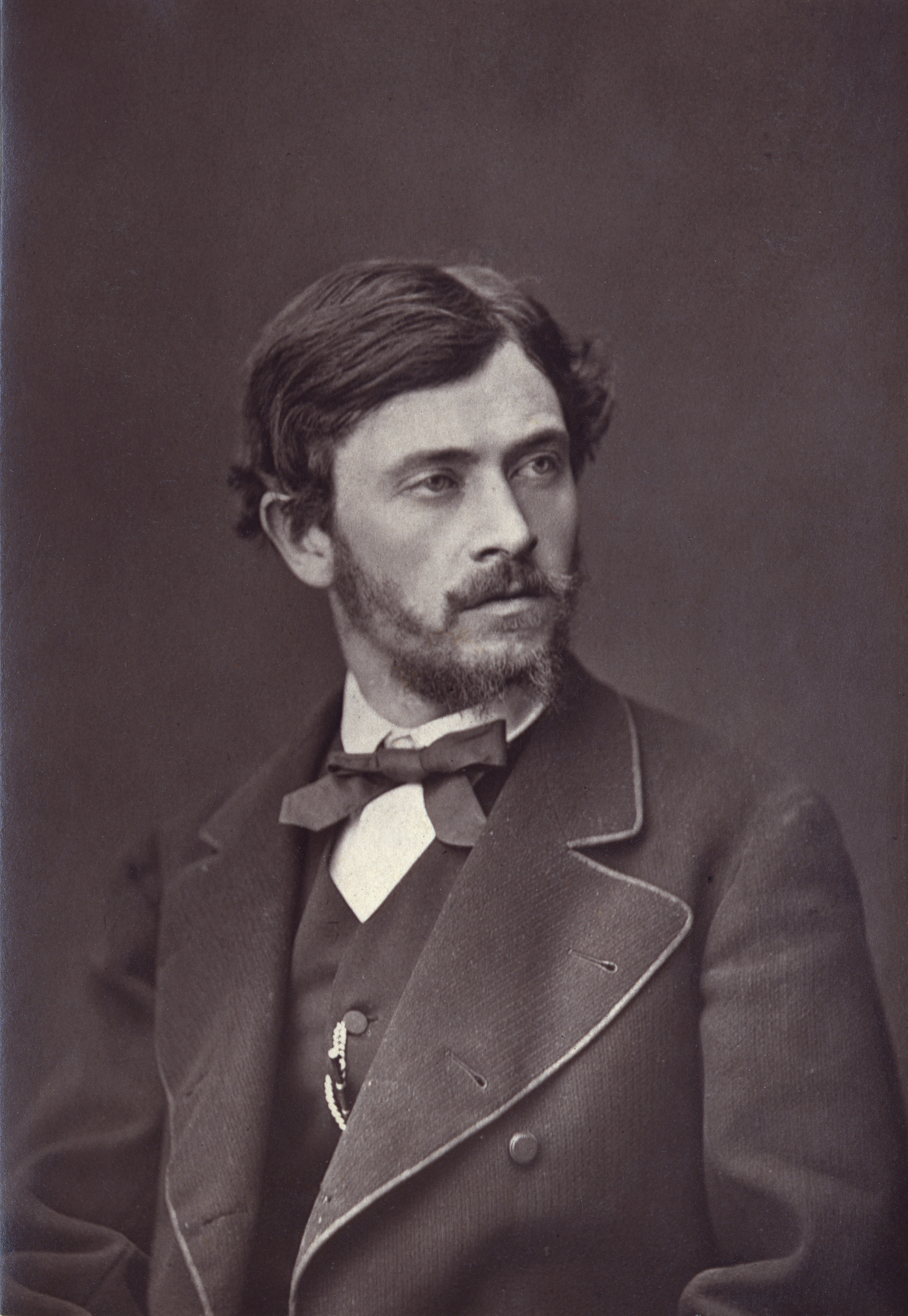
- Henri Pille in Galerie contemporaine, littéraire et artistiquec. 1875
- Born: 4 January 1844; Essômes-sur-Marne, Aisne, France
- Died: 4 March 1897 (aged 53); Paris, France
- Occupations: Painter and illustrator

Charles Henri Pille (4 January 1844 – 4 March 1897) was a French painter and illustrator.

== Life ==
Charles Henri Pille was born in Essômes-sur-Marne, Aisne, on 4 January 1844. He studied under Félix-Joseph Barrias. He submitted his first painting to the Salon in 1865. In 1869 he received the Gold Medal of the Ministry of the Emperor's household and of Fine Arts. He was awarded a gold medal at the Paris Exposition of 1889.

He was recognized by the artistic community of Montmartre. His work developed with historical scenes and genre scenes that were often tinged with humor. He is best known for his pen drawings. He made numerous illustrations for publishers, particularly Alphonse Lemerre. He contributed to magazines and newspapers such as Le Courrier Français, Le Rire, Le Monde illustré, Le Procope, Journal amusant, La Vie moderne, Le Voleur and Le Petit Français illustré. He published drawings in the review of Le Chat Noir cabaret, and helped design its silhouettes for its shadow theater shows.

In his letters to his brother Théo, Vincent van Gogh repeatedly expressed his admiration for the work of Henri Pille whom he met during his stay in Paris between May 1875 and March 1876. Henri Pille became a Knight of the Legion of Honour in 1882. He was president of the Society of Illustrators. He died in Paris on 4 March 1897.

== Books illustrated by Henri Pille ==
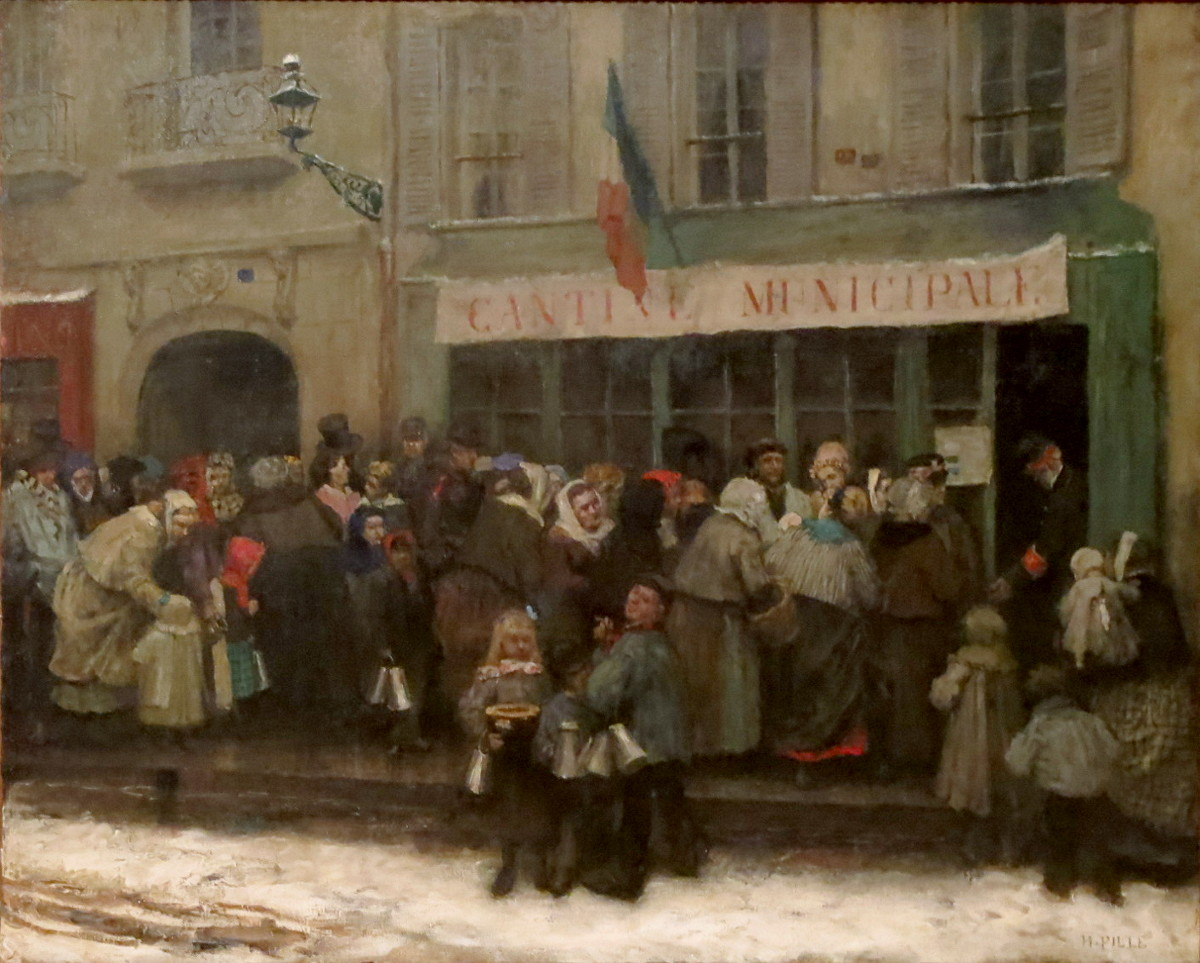
Cantine municipale pendant le siège de Paris, 1870–1871, musée Carnavalet

- Complete Works of Shakespeare, Paris, Alphonse Lemerre, 1875–1880
- Works of Alfred de Musset, Paris, Alphonse Lemerre, 1876
- Voyages en famille, Joseph-Charles Vendryes, Paris, Ludovic Baschet, 1877
- Les dames galantes, Brantôme, Paris, éditions Arnaud et Labat, 1879
- Bleuette, Conte en vers, François Coppée, Paris, Alphonse Lemerre, 1880
- Le livre des convalescents, Ernest Alexandre Honoré Coquelin (under the pseudonym Pirouette), Paris, Tresse, 1880
- Les Contes, Charles Perrault, Paris, Alphonse Lemerre, 1880
- Marie, Paris, Auguste Brizeux, Alphonse Lemerre, 1881
- Le Roman comique, Paul Scarron, Paris, Alphonse Lemerre, 1881
- Quentin Durward, Walter Scott, Paris, Librairie de Firmin-Didot & Cie, 1881
- Fariboles, Ernest Alexandre Honoré Coquelin (under the pseudonym Pirouette), Paris, Paul Ollendorf, 1882
- Les Cinq Sous d'Isaac Laquedem – Le Juif Errant – Contes et histoires pour enfants, Aimé Giron, Paris, Librairie Firmin-Didot, 1883.
- Derniers contes bleus, Édouard Laboulaye, Paris, Jouvet et Cie, 1884
- Selected works: Tales of the Merovingian times, Augustin Thierry, Paris, Léon Bonhoure, 1885
- Chansons et rondes enfantines, Jean-Baptiste Weckerlin, Garnier Frères, 1885
- Nouvelles Chansons et rondes enfantines, Jean-Baptiste Weckerlin, Garnier Frères, 1886
- II était une fois..., Savinien Lapointe, Paris, Alphonse Lemerre, 1886
- Notre-Dame de Paris, Victor Hugo, Paris, Alphonse Lemerre, 1886
- Histoire merveilleuse de Pierre Schlémihl, ou l'Homme qui a vendu son ombre, Adelbert von Chamisso, Paris, L. Westhausser, 1888.
- Héros légendaires, leur véritable histoire, Ernest d'Hervilly] Paris, Alphonse Lemerre, 1889
- Pages d'autrefois, Roger Miles, Paris A. Lanier & fils, 1889
- Ma petite sœur Naïk, Charles Delon, Paris, Alphonse Lemerre, 1891
- Histoire du célèbre Pépé, Edgar Monteil, Paris, Librairie de l'éducation de la jeunesse, 1891
- Soldats de France, actions héroïques, Gaston de Raimes, Paris, Alphonse Lemerre, 1892–1895
- Les Maris de Colette, Georges Bureau, Paris, Paul Ollendorff, 1895
- La Souris blanche, Hégésippe Moreau, Paris, Pairault & Cie éditeurs, 1895
- Les expédients de Farandole, Pierre Perrault, Paris, Armand Colin, 1895
- Le Chevalier Carême, Marc Guéchot, Paris, colin, 1896
- Don Quichotte de la Manche, Miguel de Cervantes, Charavay, Mantoux et Martin, c. 1893
- Théâtre choisi, Molière, preface by Léo Claretie, Paris, Charavay, Mantoux et Martin, c. 1900
- Twenty Children's Pieces for Piano, Francis Thomé, Henri Lemoine, undated

== Public Collections ==
- The Louvre, department of graphic arts
- Musée d'Orsay
- Carnavalet Museum, Cantine municipale pendant le siège de Paris, 1870–1871
- National Museum of Château de Pau, drawing of the history of Henry IV of France
- Musée des Beaux-Arts de Nice, Puritains et cavaliers
- Museum of Fine Arts, Rheims, La messe à Pavant (Aisne)

== Bibliography ==
- J. B. Wemsill, « Silhouettes contemporaines » in L'Art, Revue hebdomadaire illusrée, A. Ballue éditeur, 17 September 1876, 90, p. 281-284
