= Delort =

Delort is a surname. Notable people with the surname include:

- Andy Delort (born 1991) Algerian footballer
- Charles Édouard Delort (1841–1895), French painter
- Jacques-Antoine-Adrien Delort (1773 1846), French general and politician
- Pierre-Justin Delort, French priest and academic
- Robert Delort (born 1932), French academic
