= Georges Croegaert =

Belgian painter (1848–1923)

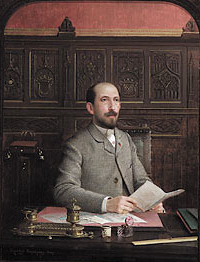
- Self-portrait
- Born: 7 October 1848, Antwerp, Belgium
- Died: 1923, Paris
- Education: Royal Academy of Fine Arts (Antwerp)
- Movement: Realism

Georges Croegaert (7 October 1848 – 1923) was a Belgian academic painter who spent most of his career in Paris. He is known for his genre paintings of scenes from elegant society and portraits of women. He also had a reputation for his humorous depictions of red-robed Catholic cardinals executed in a highly realist style.

== Life ==
Georges Croegaert was born in Antwerp. He studied at the Antwerp Academy of Fine Arts. He moved to Paris in 1876 where he remained active as an artist for the rest of his life. He had a successful career as a portrait and genre painter. His paintings received critical acclaim and were sought after by English and American collectors. He exhibited regularly at the Paris Salon between 1882 and 1914 and in Vienna in 1888.

He died in Paris in 1923 after a long and successful career.

== Work ==
=== General ===
Croegaert painted initially highly detailed still lifes, bird and flower subjects, and occasional outdoor genre scenes. He built a career with his salon portraits of glamorous young women dressed in sumptuous fabrics set in luxurious rooms. He also gained a reputation as the leading artist in the genre of 'cardinal paintings', humorous representations of cardinals engaged in various mundane activities in lavish surroundings. His works are very narrative and the objects in the background support the story of the painting. His paintings are characterized by a high degree of finish and a rich palette.

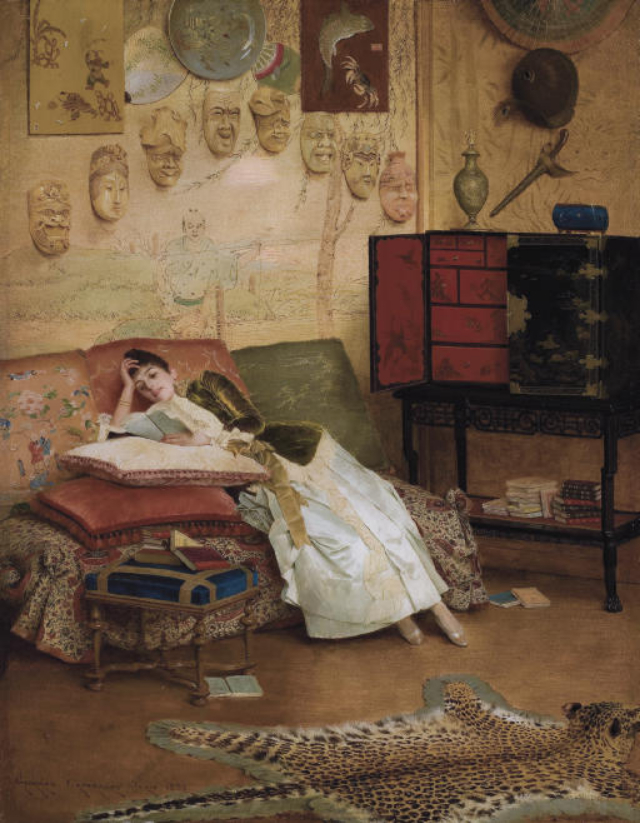
Young lady reading in a japonising interior

=== Society portraits ===
Most of Croegaert’s portraits of elegant young women are distinguished by their lavish detail. The influence of his relation, Jan Jacob Croegaert-Van Bree, is suspected in the elegance and realism of his style. When he arrived in Paris portrait paintings depicting the lifestyle of contemporary, fashionable city dwellers had become popular. The trend was started in Paris in the late 1850s by the Belgian painter Alfred Stevens and was then adopted by other Belgian painters working in Paris such as Charles Baugniet and Gustave Léonard de Jonghe and the Frenchman Auguste Toulmouche. By the late 1860s there was a ready market for genre scenes with bourgeois figures, usually young glamorous women, depicted in sumptuous surroundings. With the onset of the Belle Epoque in the 1870s, this type of paintings depicting fashionable women set in an interior became popular at the Paris Salon.

The highly realistic depictions of Croegaert of society women have usually a slightly ironic undertone. This is clear in his wink at the contemporary fashions of Japonism and Orientalism in his paintings of Young lady reading in a japonising interior and the Dreams of the Orient, where the women depicted appear overcome by their infatuation with Japanese and Oriental art.

=== Small-scale portraits ===
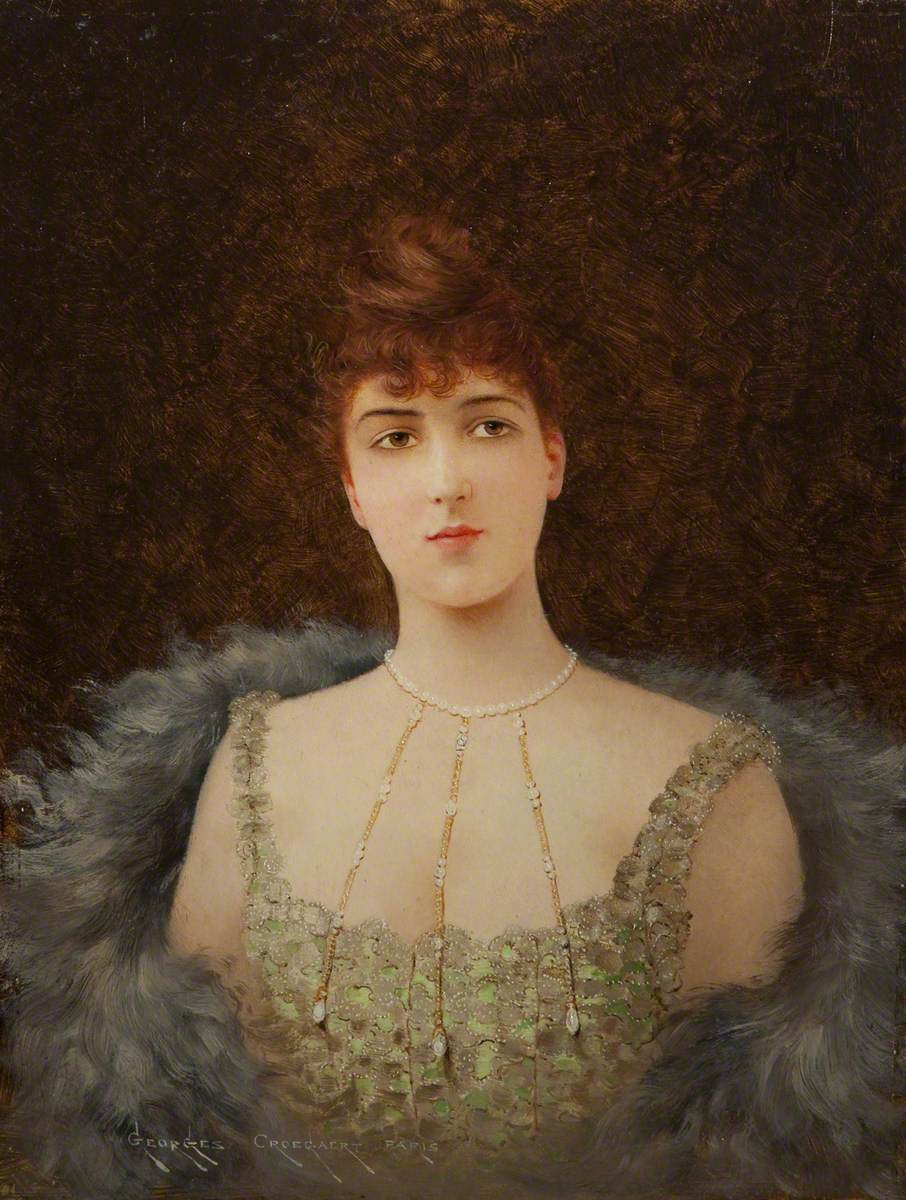
Portrait of an auburn-haired woman

In the last decades of the nineteenth century Croegaert painted a series of small portraits of women rendered in a highly realistic manner. The women are depicted at bust length and appear to melt into the pale unadorned backgrounds. These portraits have generic titles such as A Blonde (Russell-Cotes Art Gallery and Museum, Bournemouth) or Portrait of an Auburn-Haired Woman (Haworth Art Gallery). The artist's usual eye for colour and detail and a concern for the overall effect of design characterize these paintings.

=== Cardinal paintings ===
Possibly looking for a lucrative niche in the market, Croegaert started to paint 'cardinal paintings', sometimes also referred to as ‘anti-clerical art’. These paintings depict Roman Catholic cardinals in a sumptuous setting typically engaging in some banal activity. Georges Croegaert was not the only artist in Paris practicing in this genre.

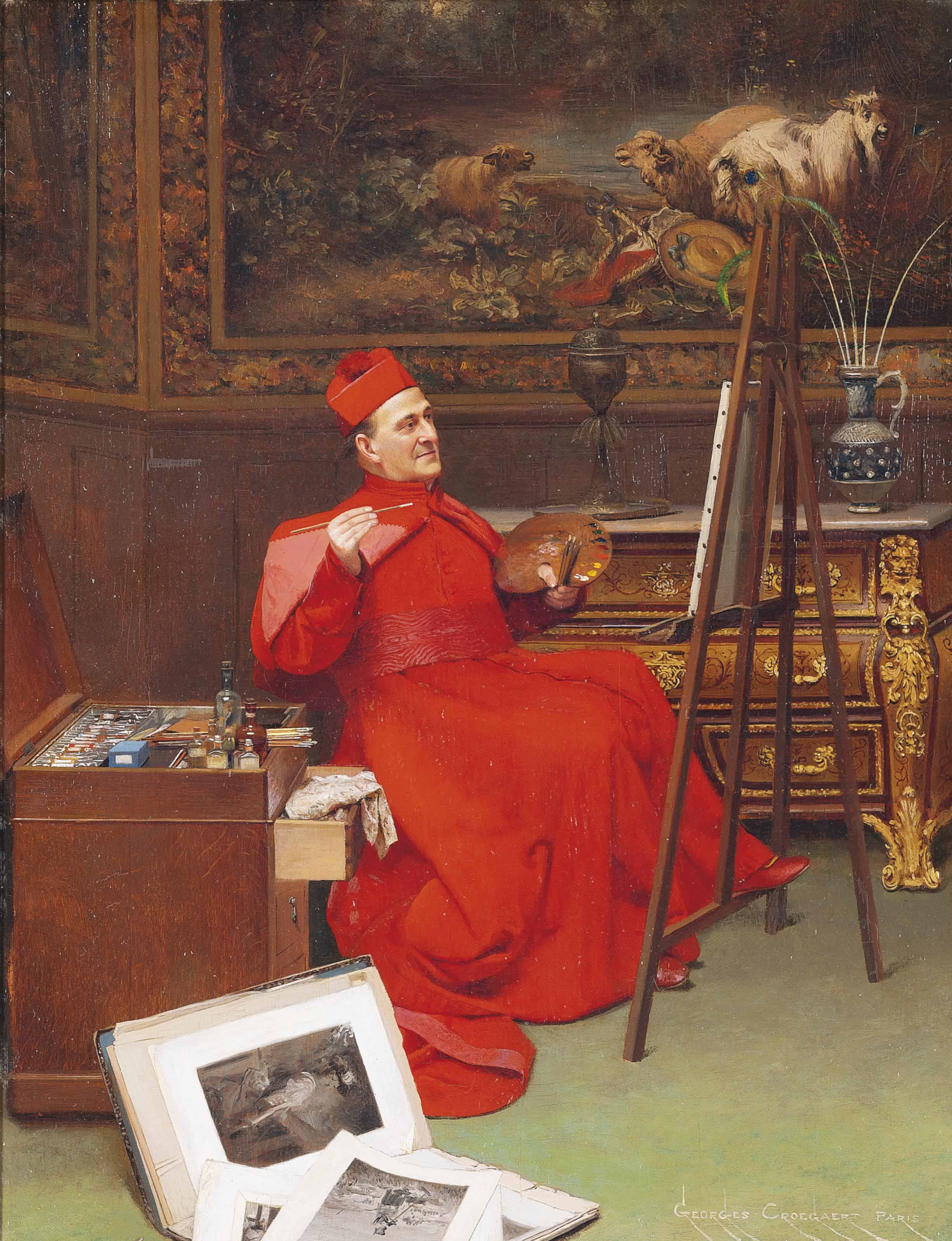
The amateur artist

Others who made a name in the genre include the Italian Andrea Landini and the Frenchmen Jehan Georges Vibert, Charles Edouard Delort and Marcel Brunery. By depicting cardinals participating in activities such as 'approving the artist’s nude model', card games, excessive or sumptuous eating and drinking and indulgent pastimes such as philately and painting, these painters poked fun at the excessive and sometimes debauched lifestyles of the upper echelons of the Catholic clergy. There was clearly a large demand for these paintings as evidenced by the fact that so many artists worked in this genre.

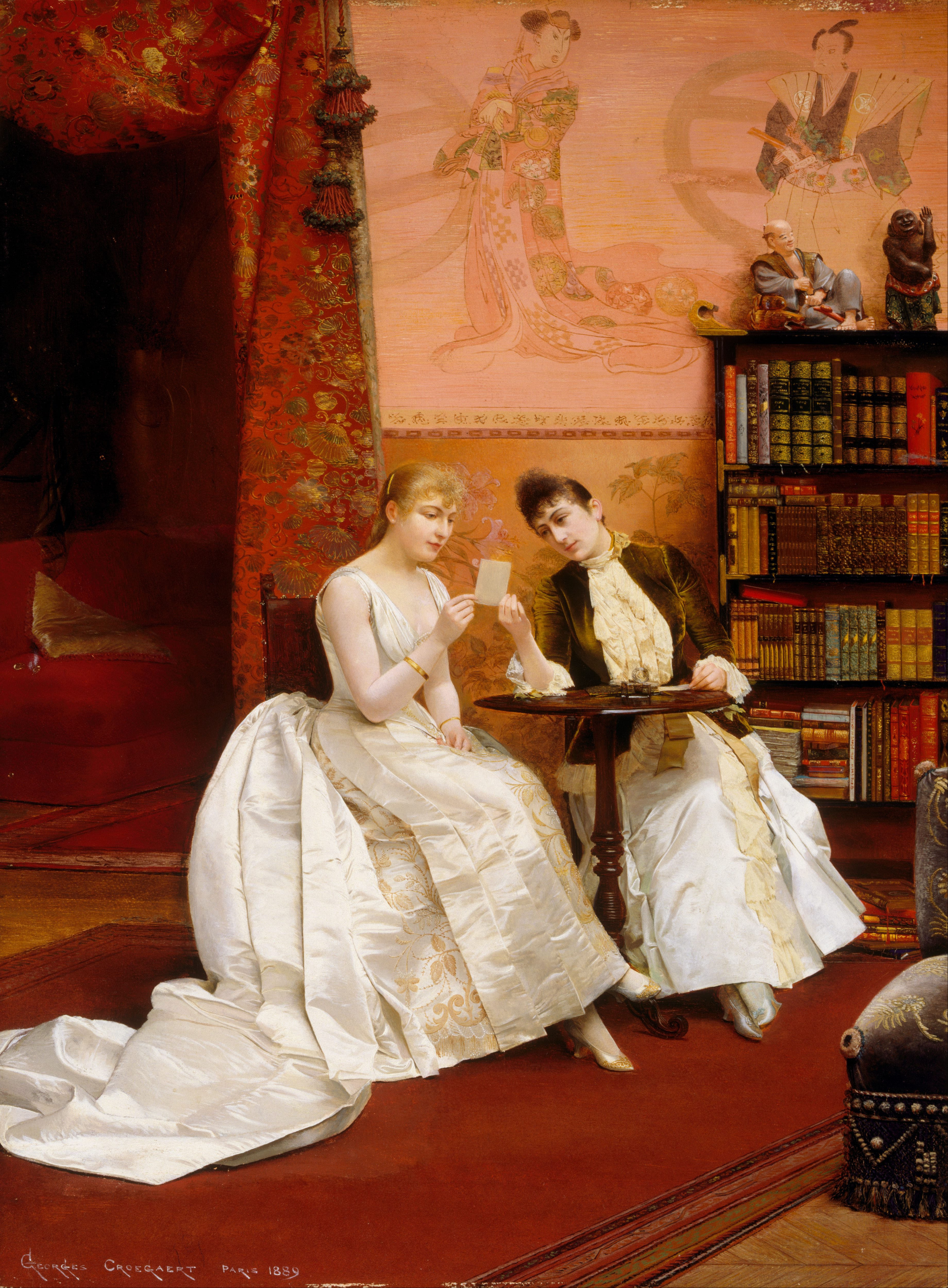
Confidences

The tone of Croegaert’s cardinal paintings was slightly mocking rather than overtly anti-clerical. Croegaert’s very detailed technique was suited for this genre as it allowed him to depict the excesses of the cardinals' lifestyle amid an environment of ornate furnishings, tapestries, glass and silverware rendered in realistic detail. He was particularly accomplished in capturing the vivid reds and purples of the cardinals' robes and the characterisation and humour in the faces of his somewhat pathetic subjects.
