= Leo Herrmann =

- Born: July 2, 1853
- Died: 1927 (aged 73–74)
- Movement: Anti-clerical art

Leo Herrmann (2 July 1853 – 1927) was a French anti-clerical painter.

Herrmann was educated at the École des Beaux-Arts, and learned under the tutelage Ernest Meissonier. He entered the Parisian art scene in 1875 at the Paris Salon. Herrmann occasionally painted dandies or soldiers, but became a successful artist by creating works that depict cardinals wearing red cassocks in comical scenarios.

Some of his paintings have clerics feeding swans; others have cardinals themselves painting. Another has a cardinal drinking wine through a long straw.

== Works ==
His first painting, shown in 1875, is A Bout d'Argument. Others include La Bonne Histoire (1876), Le Scandale du Jour (1877), Au Rendez-Vous (1887), Le Goûter (1889), Au Cabare (1896), The Cordon Bleu, Suzette's Slipper, and L'incroyable.

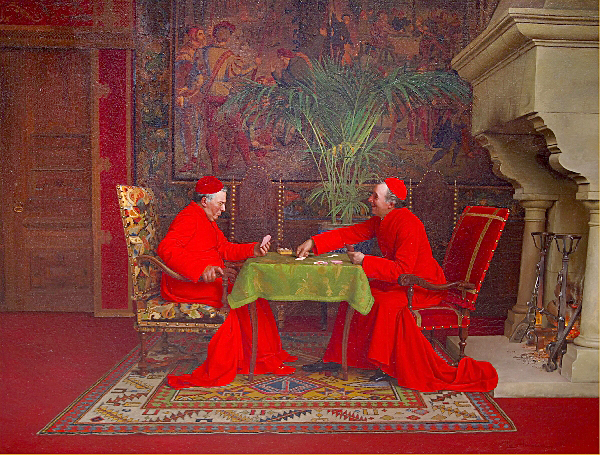
The Ace of Hearts

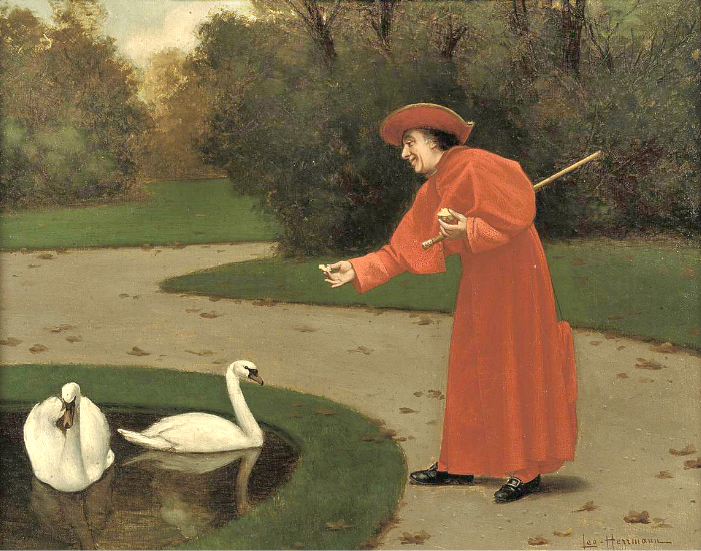
Feeding Time

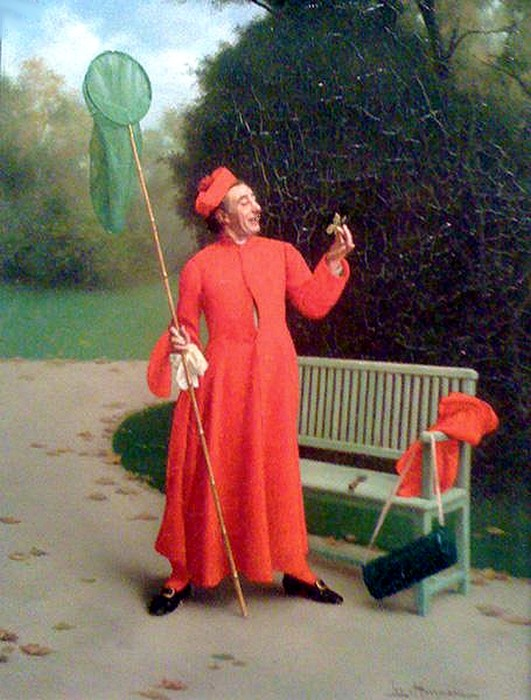
Butterfly Hunting

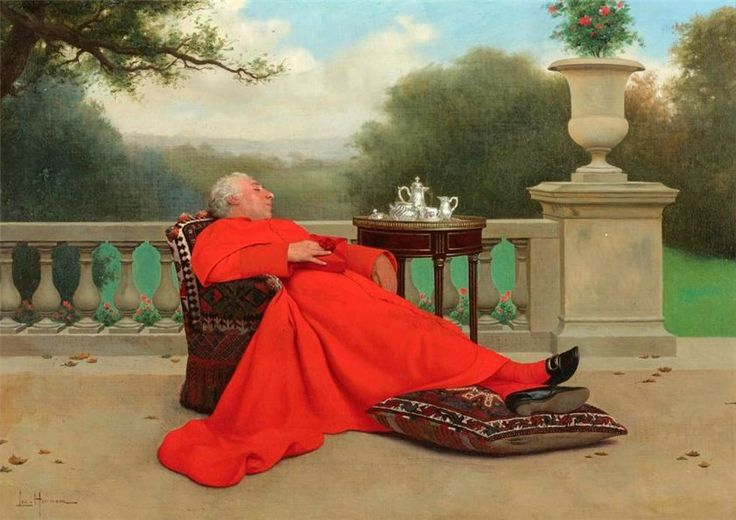
The Cardinal's Nap
