= Francesco Brunery =

Italian academic painter (1849–1926)

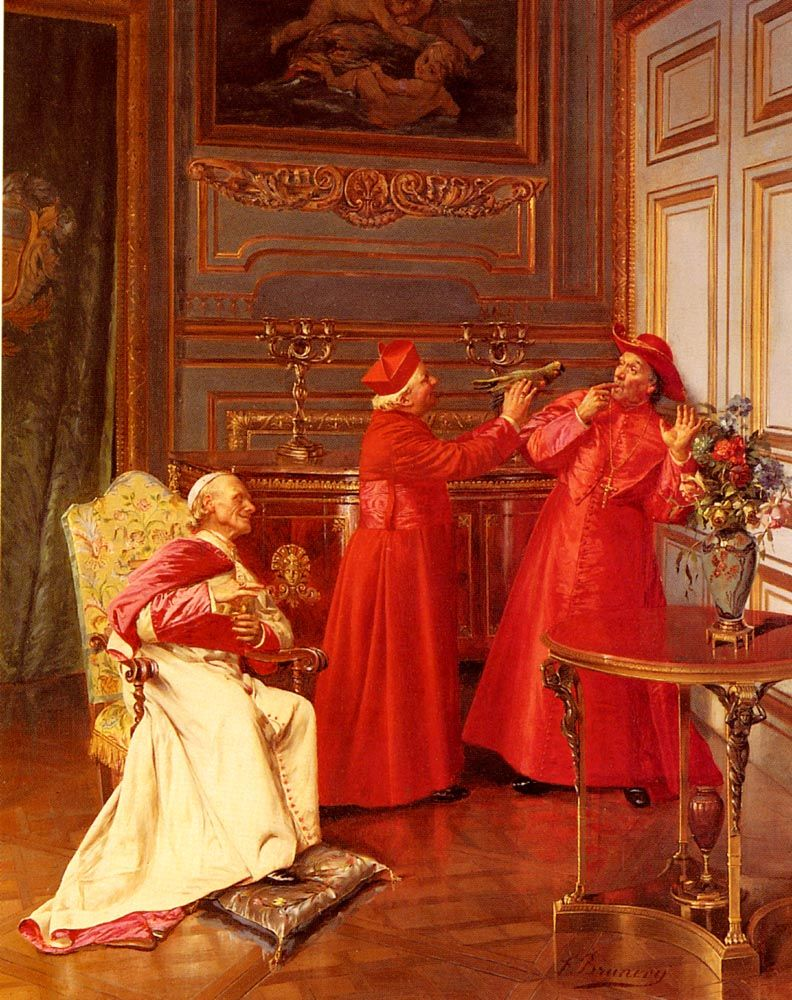
Non Abiate Paura by Francesco Brunery

Francesco Brunery (1849–1926), also known as François Brunery and as François Bruneri, was an Italian academic painter. He was born in Turin, Italy and studied with Jean-Léon Gérôme and Léon Bonnat. Brunery received an honorable mention at the Paris Salon of 1903. He is associated with anti-clerical art.
