= Anti-clerical art =

Genre of art

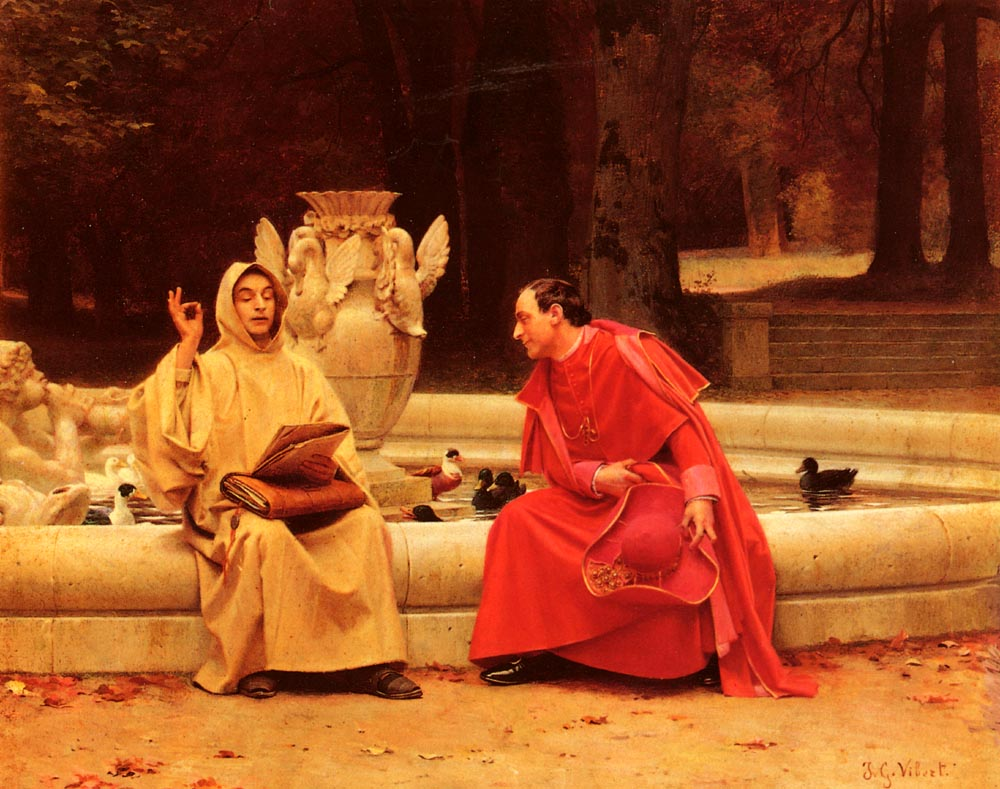
’A Fine Point’ by Jehan Georges Vibert. Note the direction of the cardinal’s gaze and the sculpture to the young monk’s right.

Anti-clerical art is a genre of art portraying clergy, especially Catholic clergy, in unflattering contexts. It was especially popular in France during the second half of the 19th century, at a time that the anti-clerical message suited the prevailing political mood. Typical paintings show cardinals in their bright red robes engaging in unseemly activities within their lavish private quarters.

Nineteenth and early twentieth century artists known for their anti-clerical art include Francesco Brunery, Marcel Brunery, Georges Croegaert, Charles Édouard Delort, Jehan Georges Vibert, Jules Benoit-Levy, Adolphe Henri Laissement and Eduardo Zamacois y Zabala.

== Examples of anti-clerical art ==
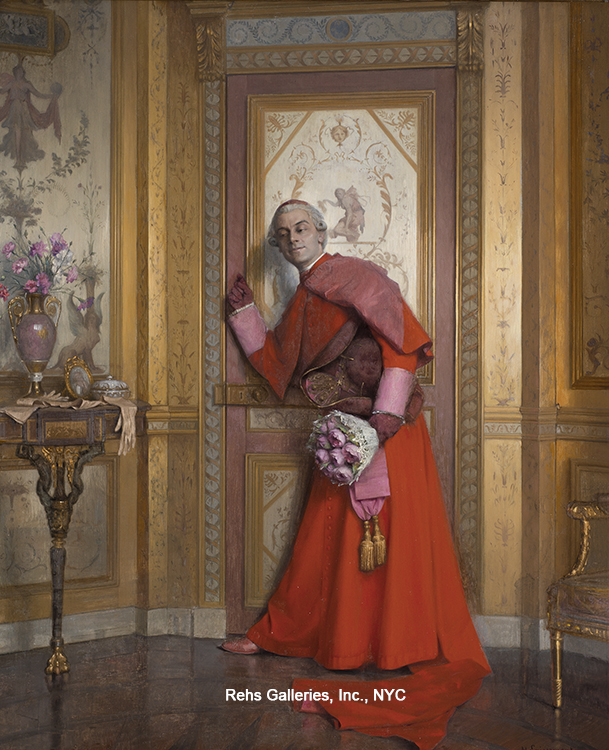
An Unexpected Visitor Marie Antoinette's Antechamber, by Henri Adolphe Laissement, Rehs Galleries, Inc.

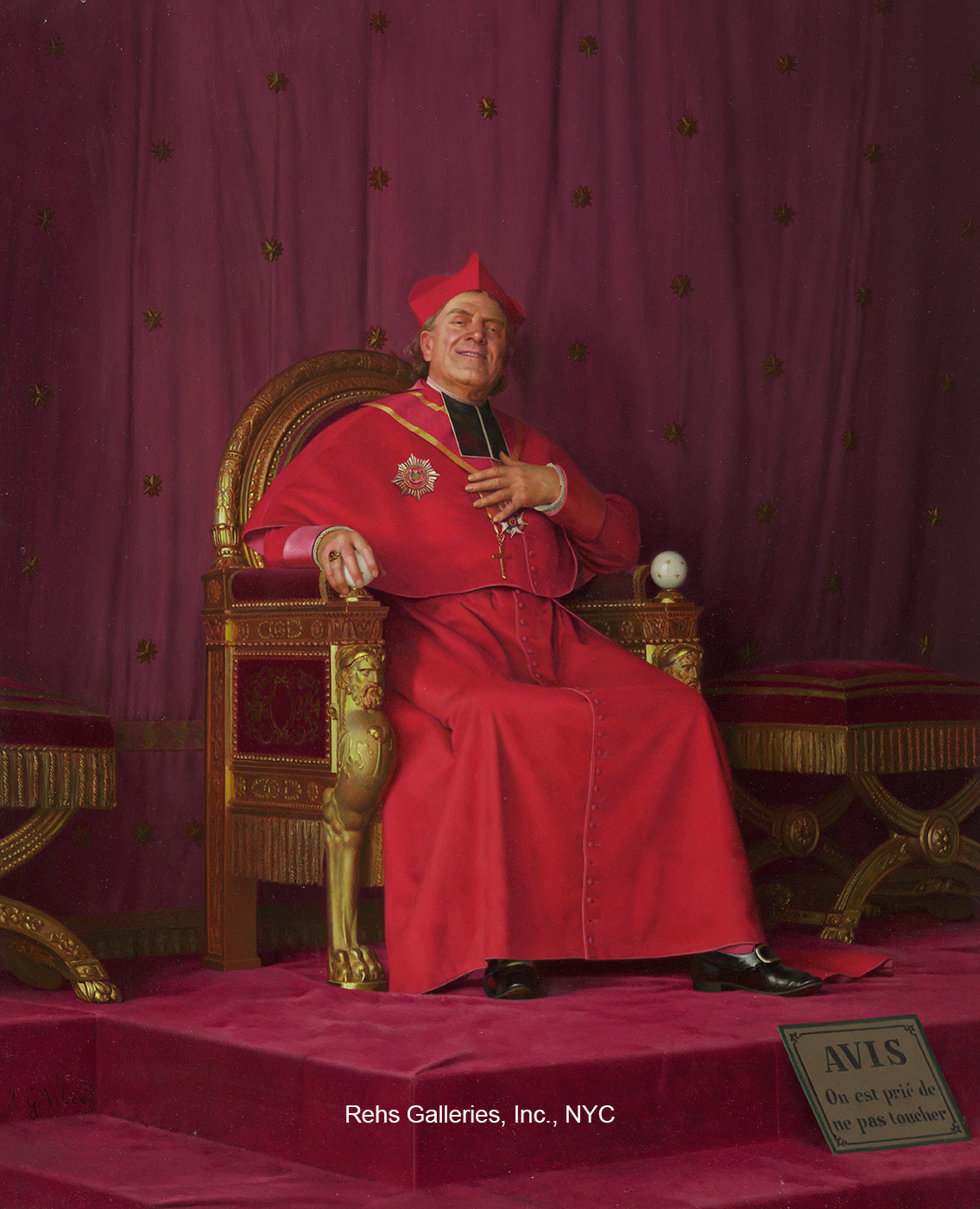
If I Were King, 1898, by Jehan Georges Vibert, Rehs Galleries, Inc.

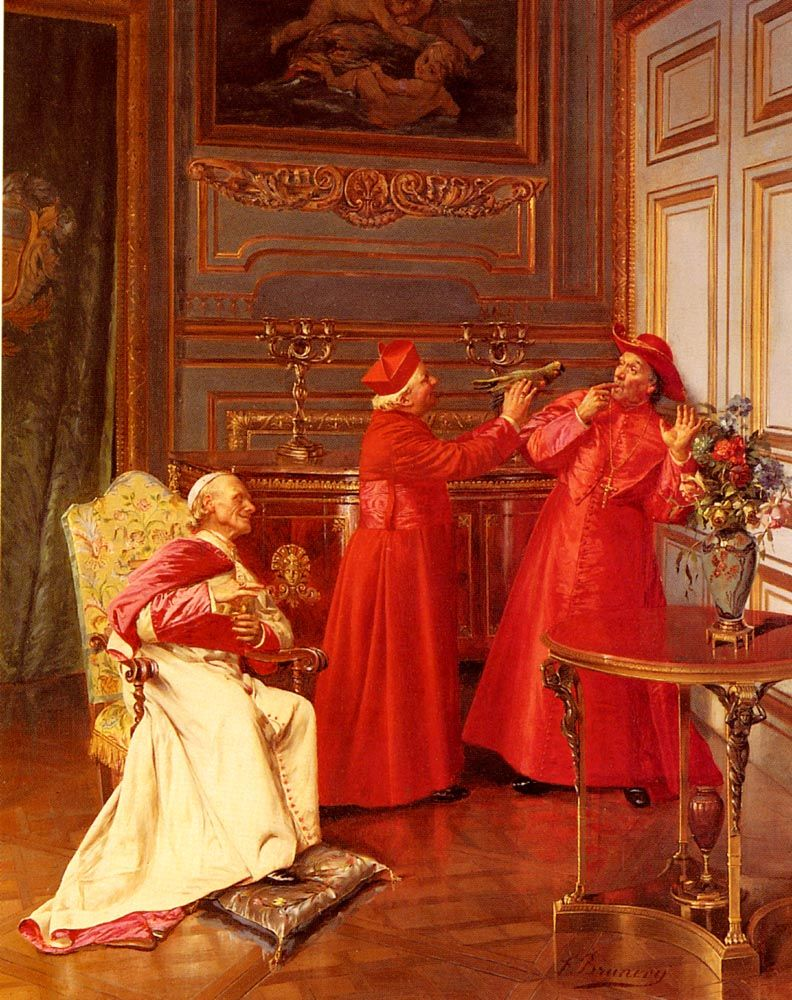
Non Abiate Paura by Francesco Brunery

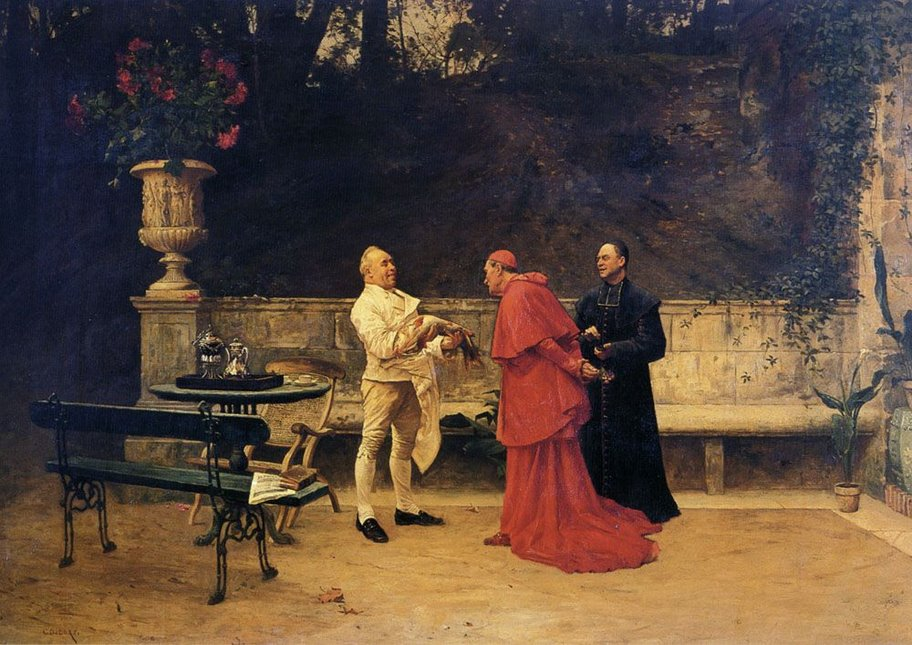
Friday by Charles Édouard Delort, private collection

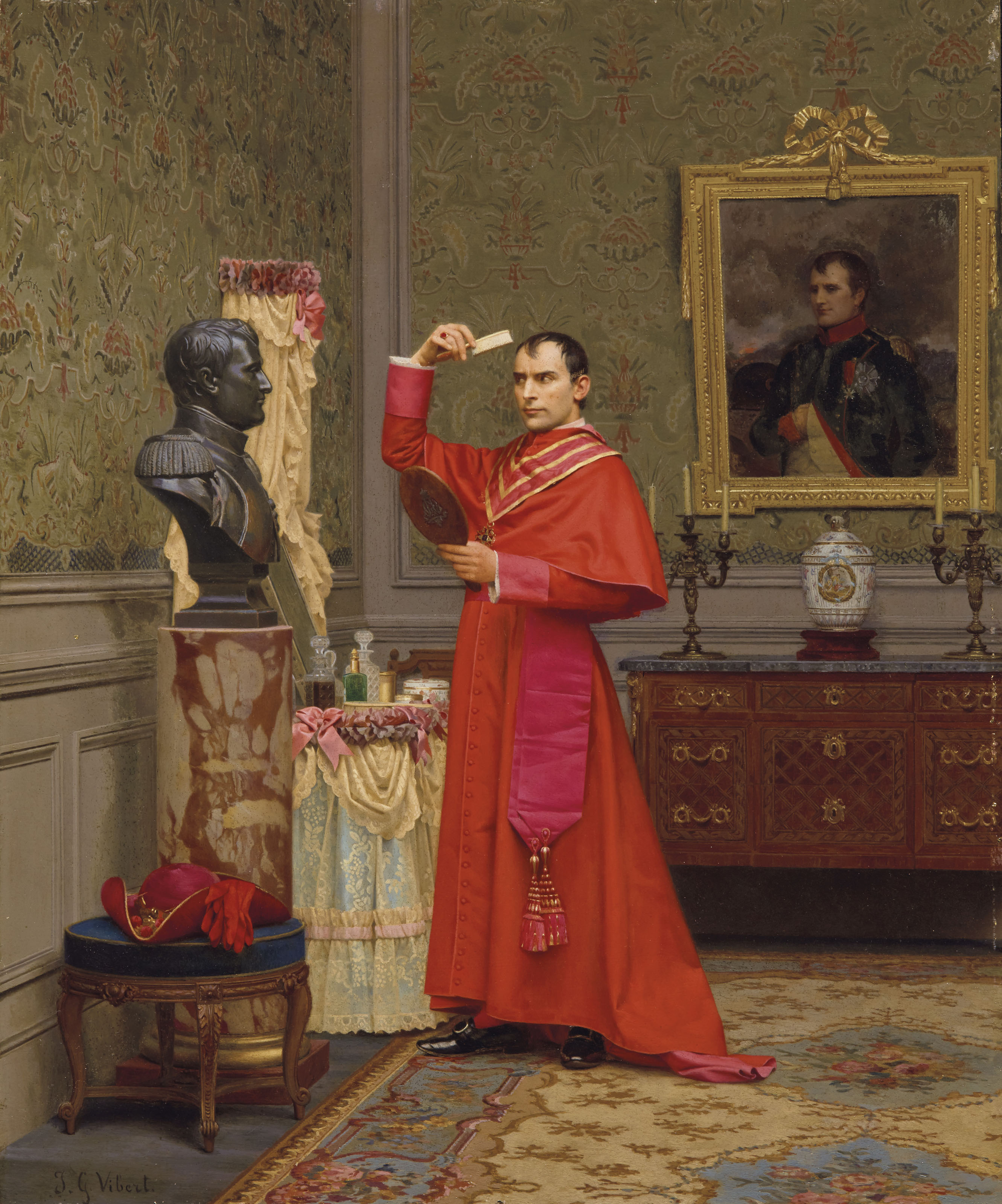
The comparison by Jehan Georges Vibert, private collection

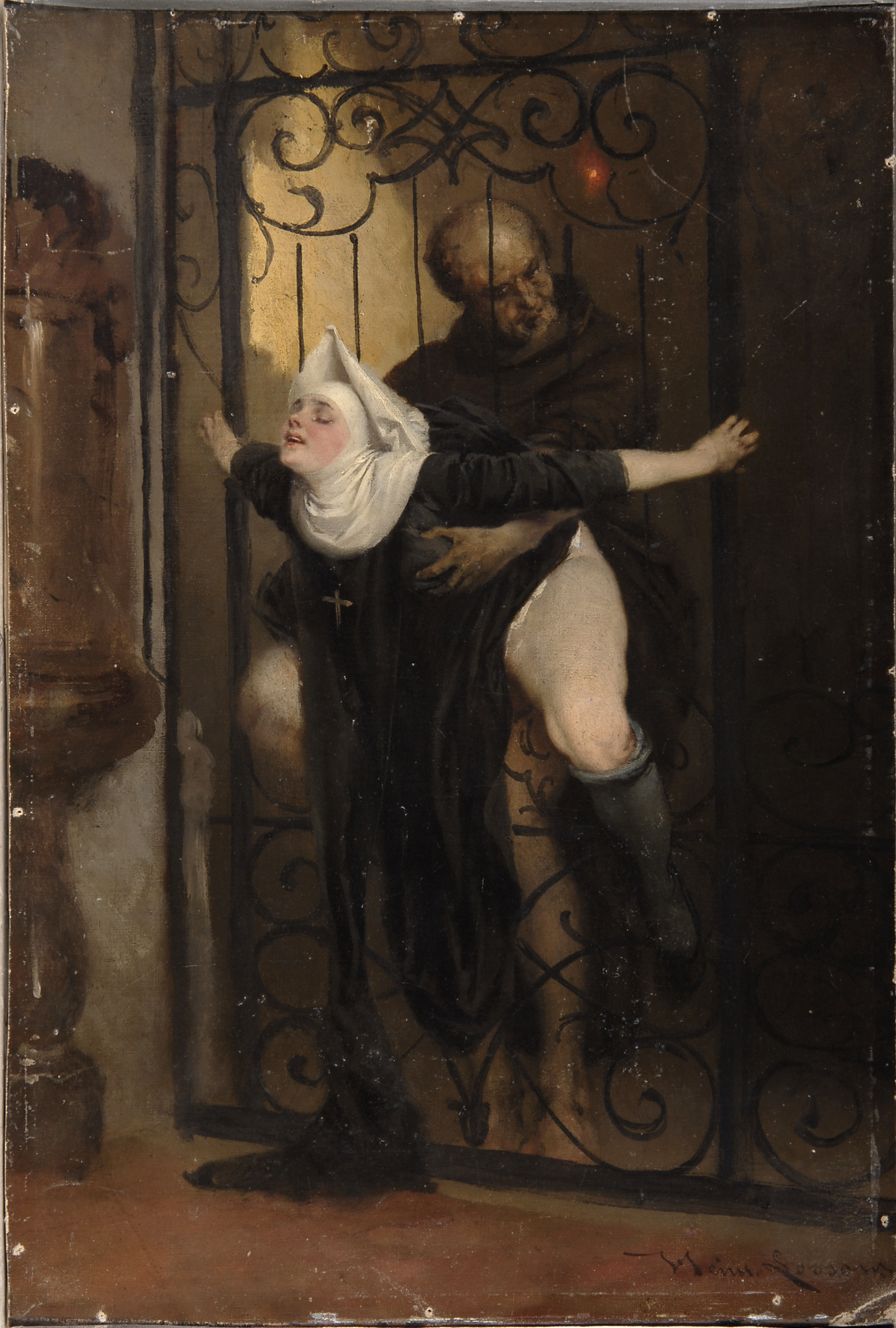
The Sin, 1880, by Heinrich Lossow

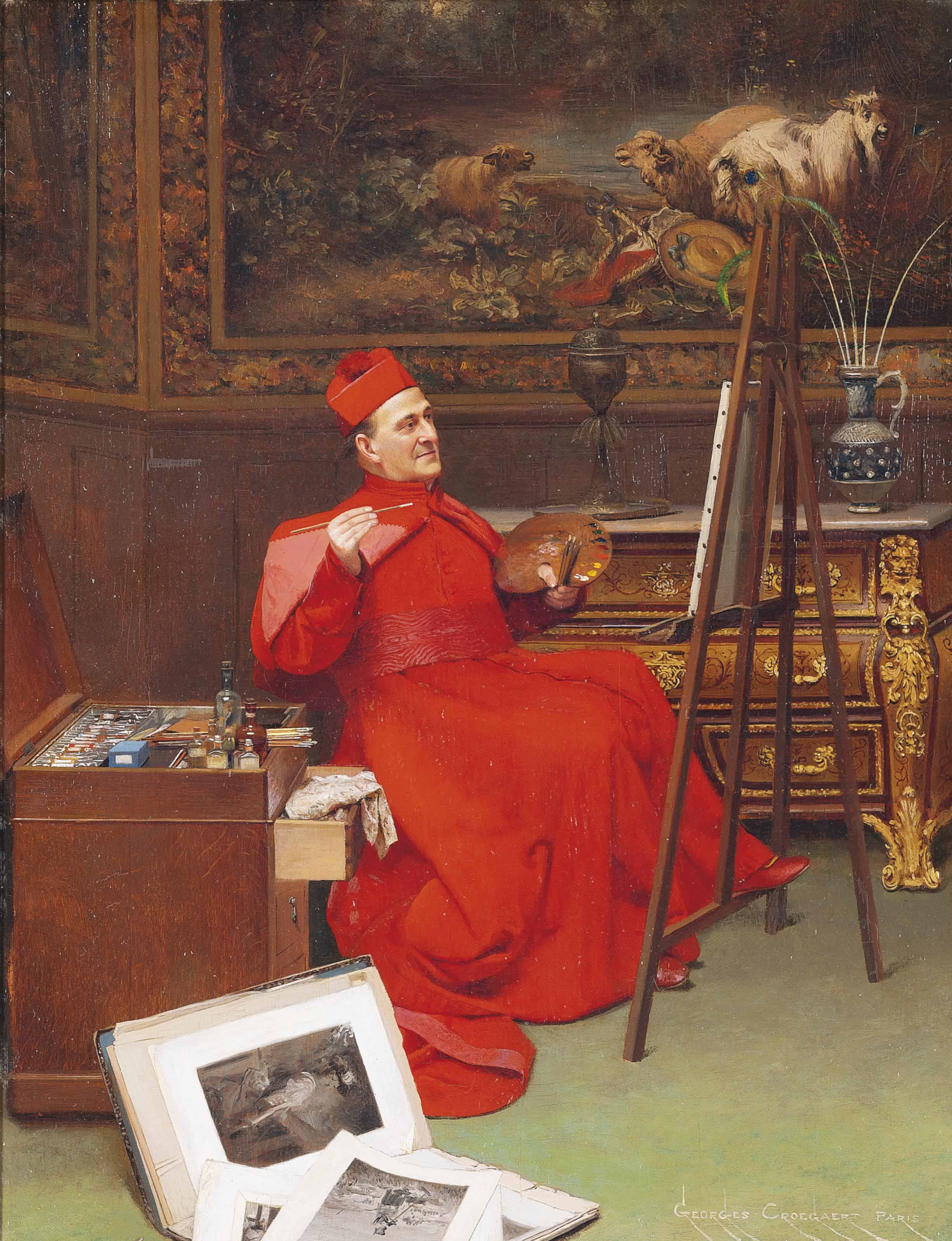
The Amateur Artist by Georges Croegaert, private collection

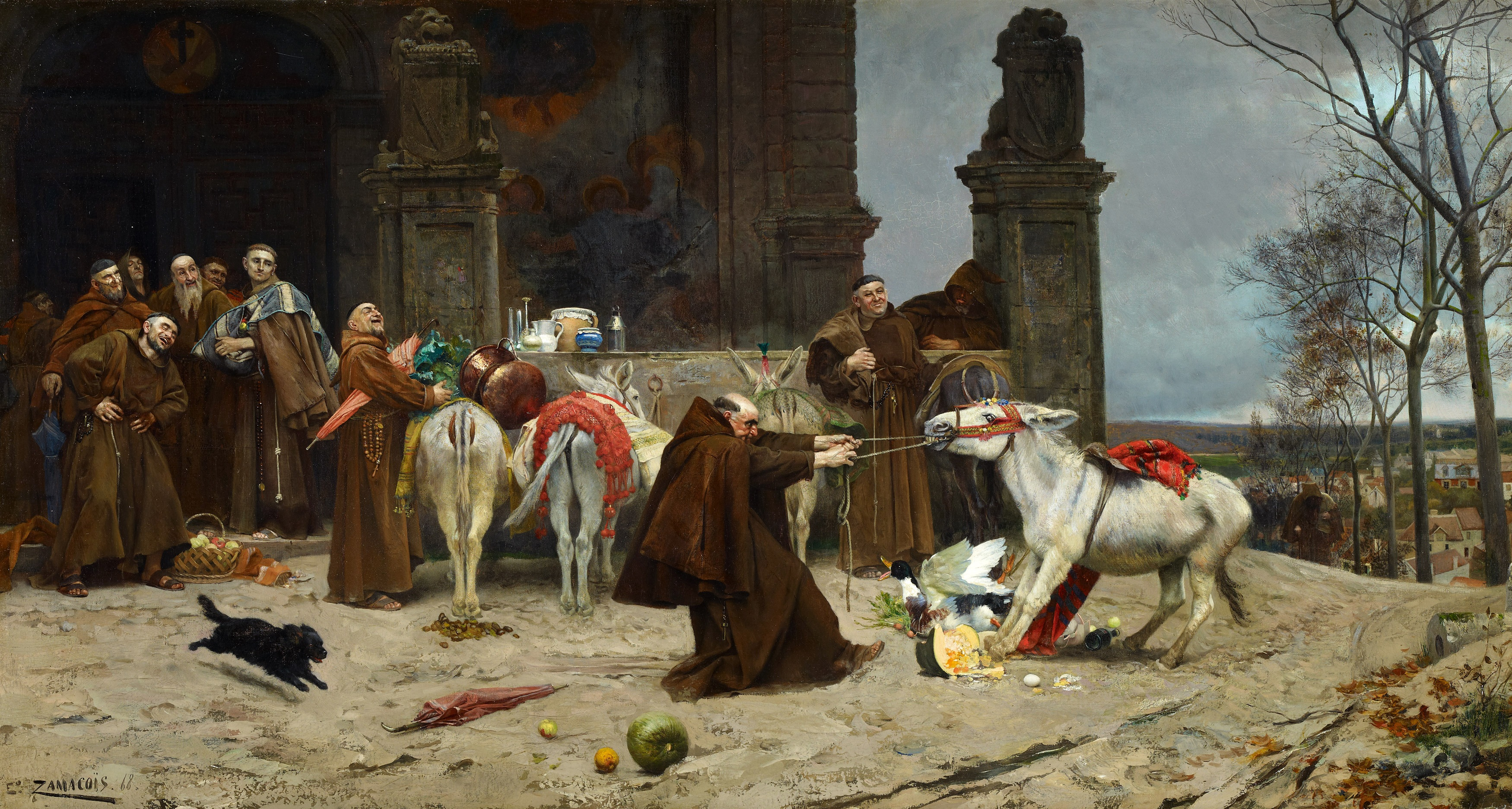
Returning to the Monastery by Eduardo Zamacois y Zabala, 1868, Carmen Thyssen Museum

== See also ==
- Anti-Catholicism
- Anti-clericalism
