= Jehan Georges Vibert =

French painter (1840–1902)

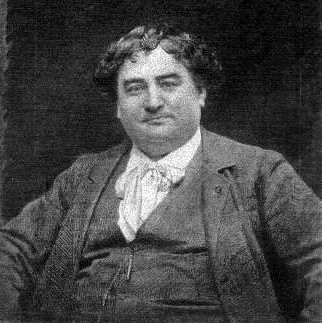
- Born: Jehan Georges Vibert; 30 September 1840; Saint-Étienne-de-Saint-Geoirs, Isère, France
- Died: 28 July 1902 (aged 61)
- Occupation: Academic painter
- Awards: Legion of Honour - Officer (1882)

Jehan Georges Vibert or Jean Georges Vibert (French: [ʒɑ̃ ʒɔʁʒ vibɛʁ]; 30 September 1840 – 28 July 1902) was a French academic painter.

== Biography ==
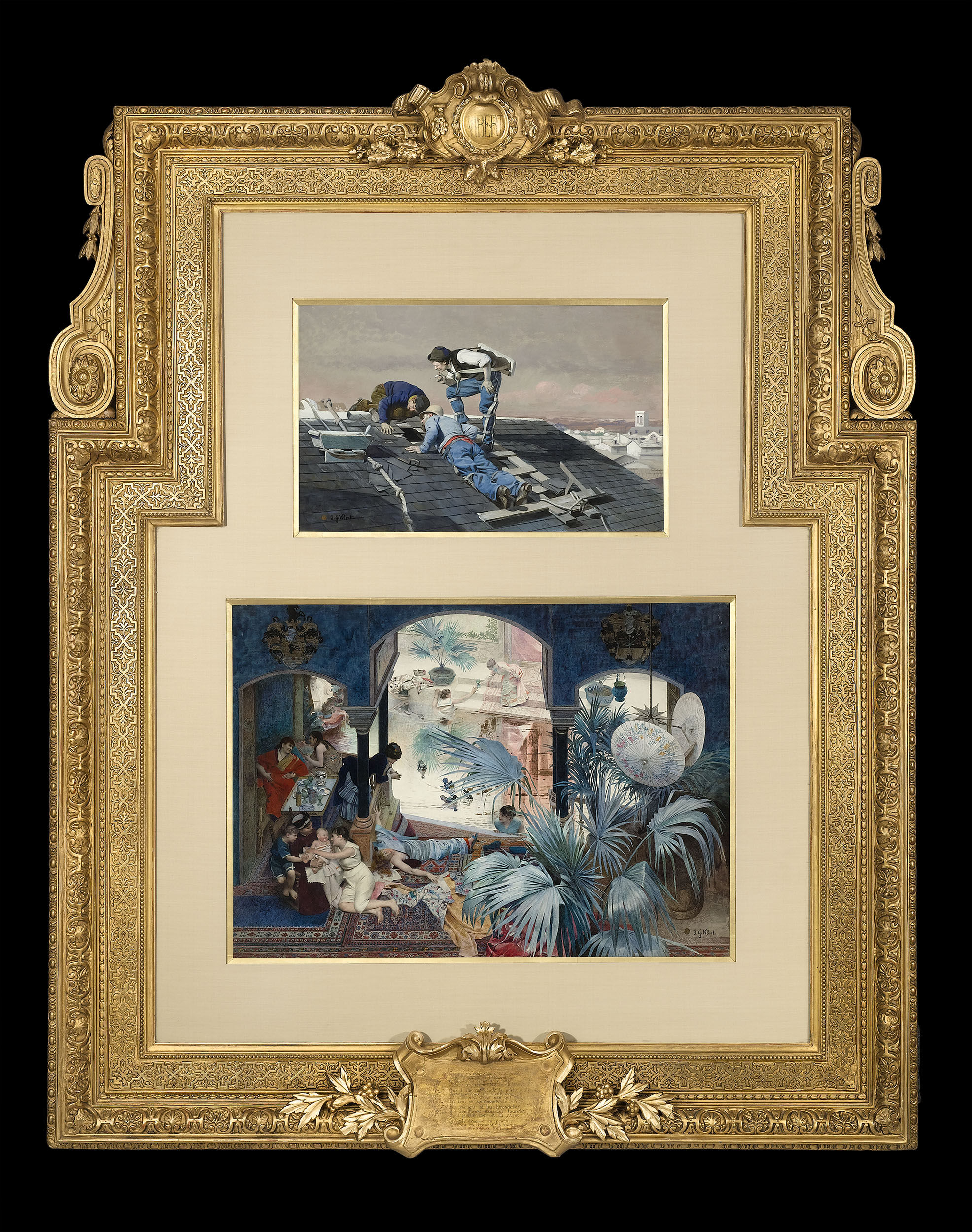
Peeping Roofers & the Woman's Bath, painted in 1880 for the Vanderbilts

He was born in Paris, the son of engraver and publisher Théodore Vibert, and grandson of the influential rose-breeder Jean-Pierre Vibert. He began his artistic training at a young age under the instruction of his maternal grandfather, engraver Jean-Pierre-Marie Jazet. Vibert was more interested in painting than engraving and entered the studio of Félix-Joseph Barrias and eventually the École des Beaux-Arts when he was sixteen. He remained at the École for six years under the instruction of history painter François-Edouard Picot.

Vibert debuted at the Salon of 1863 with La Sieste (The Siesta) and Repentir (Repentance).

During the Franco-Prussian War, Vibert became a sharpshooter and was wounded at the battle of Malmaison in October 1870. In recognition of his sacrifice, he was awarded a Knight in France's Legion of Honour on 18 June 1870, which was upgraded to the Legion of Honour rank of Officer on 18 February 1882.

Vibert submitted work to the Salon until 1899. The popularity of his works spread, notably in America, and fetched high prices including commissions from John Jacob Astor IV and William Vanderbilt. A large collection of works by Vibert was amassed by the heiress May Louise Maytag on behalf of then bishop of Miami Coleman Carroll, who greatly fancied them. This large cache was then donated to the Florida seminary St. John Vianney College in Miami. At this location the impressive collection has had a somewhat checkered conservation history, as well as exhibition history due to the discomfiture of later bishops with the seeming anti-clericalism of the paintings (lighthearted debaucheries, etc.).

== Death ==
Vibert died on 28 July 1902, and is buried at the Père-Lachaise cemetery (4th division) in Paris.

== Gallery ==
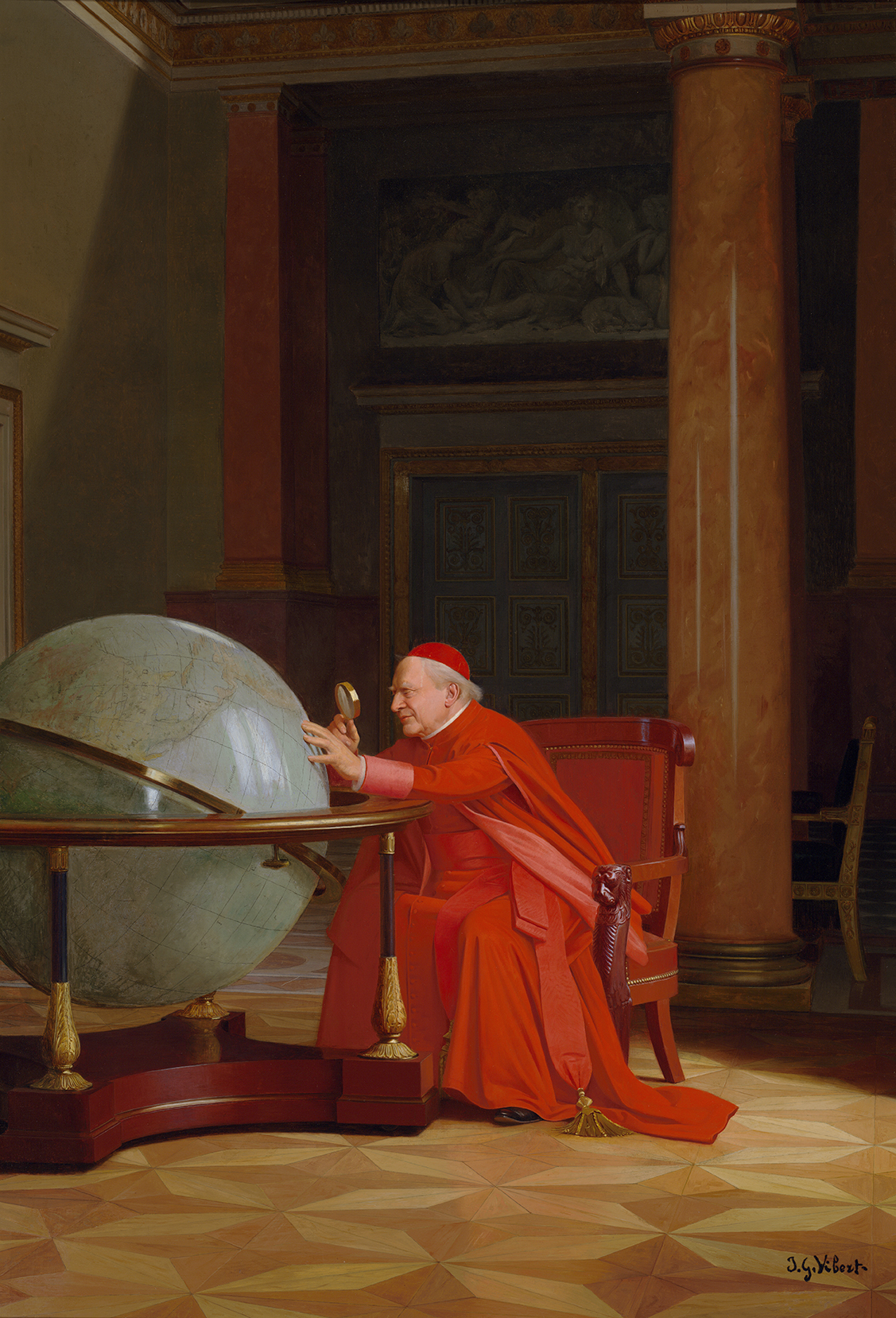
Around the World, c. 1840–1902, Haggin Museum

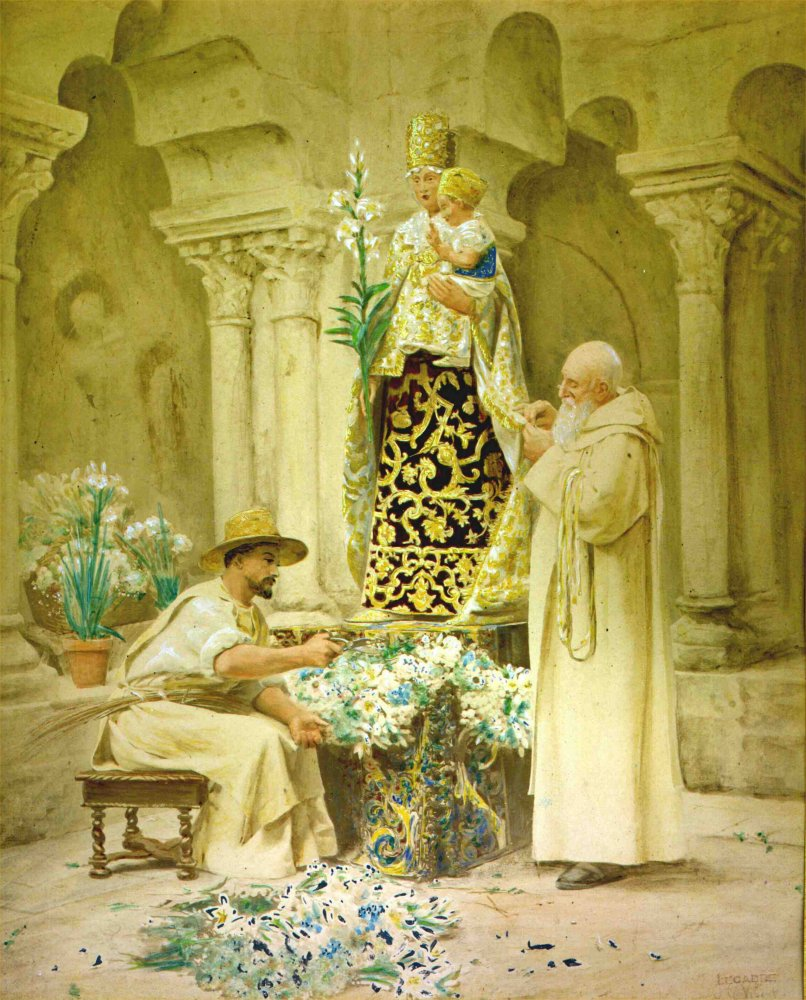
Preparations for the Procession

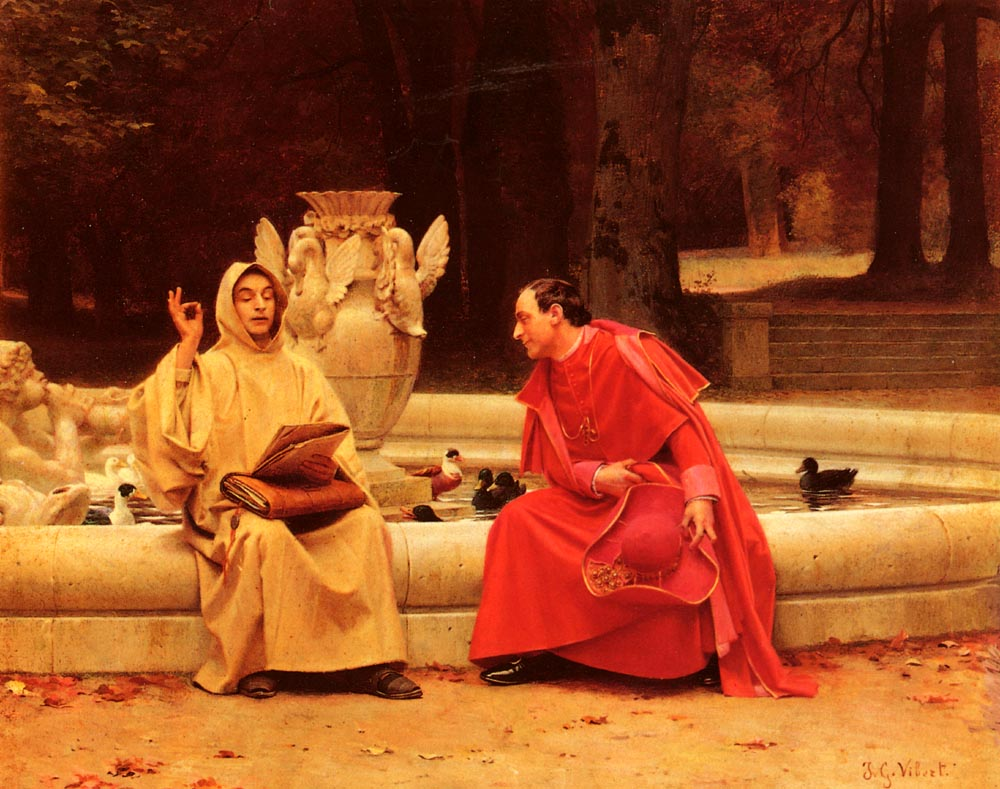
A Fine Point

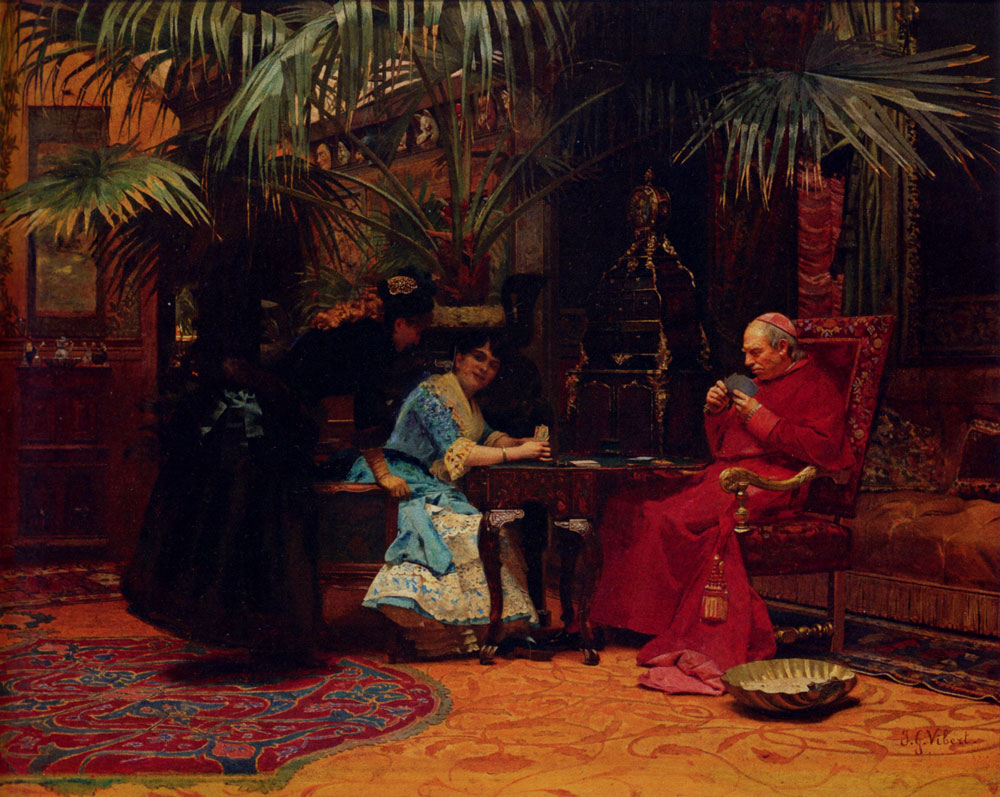
The Church in Danger

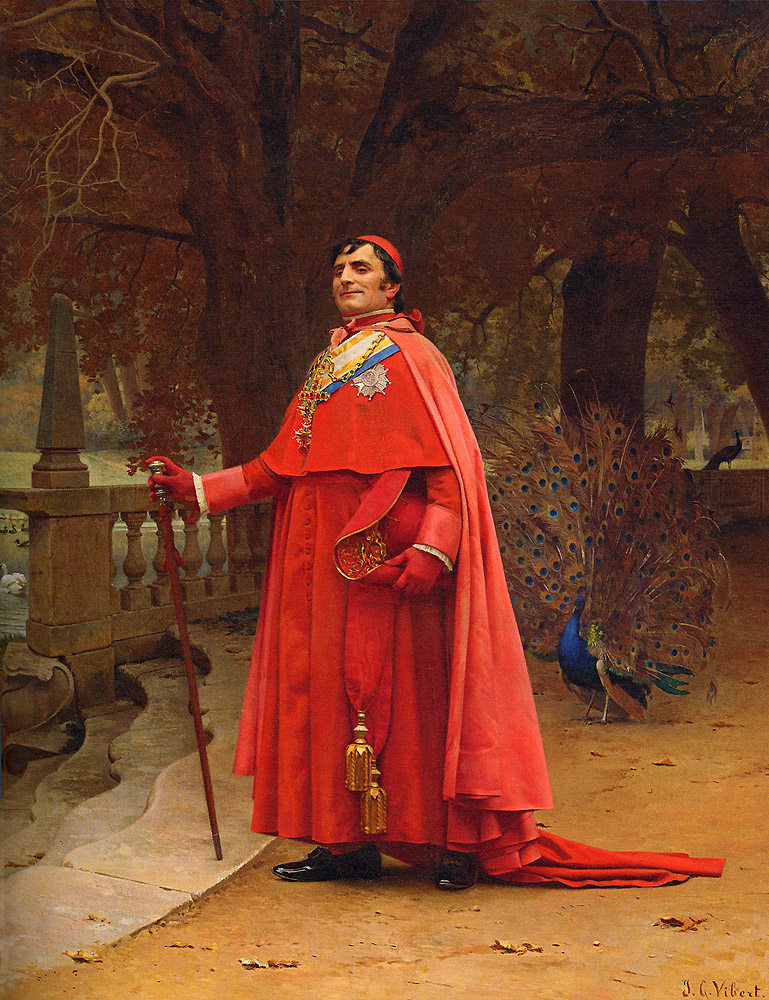
The Preening Peacock

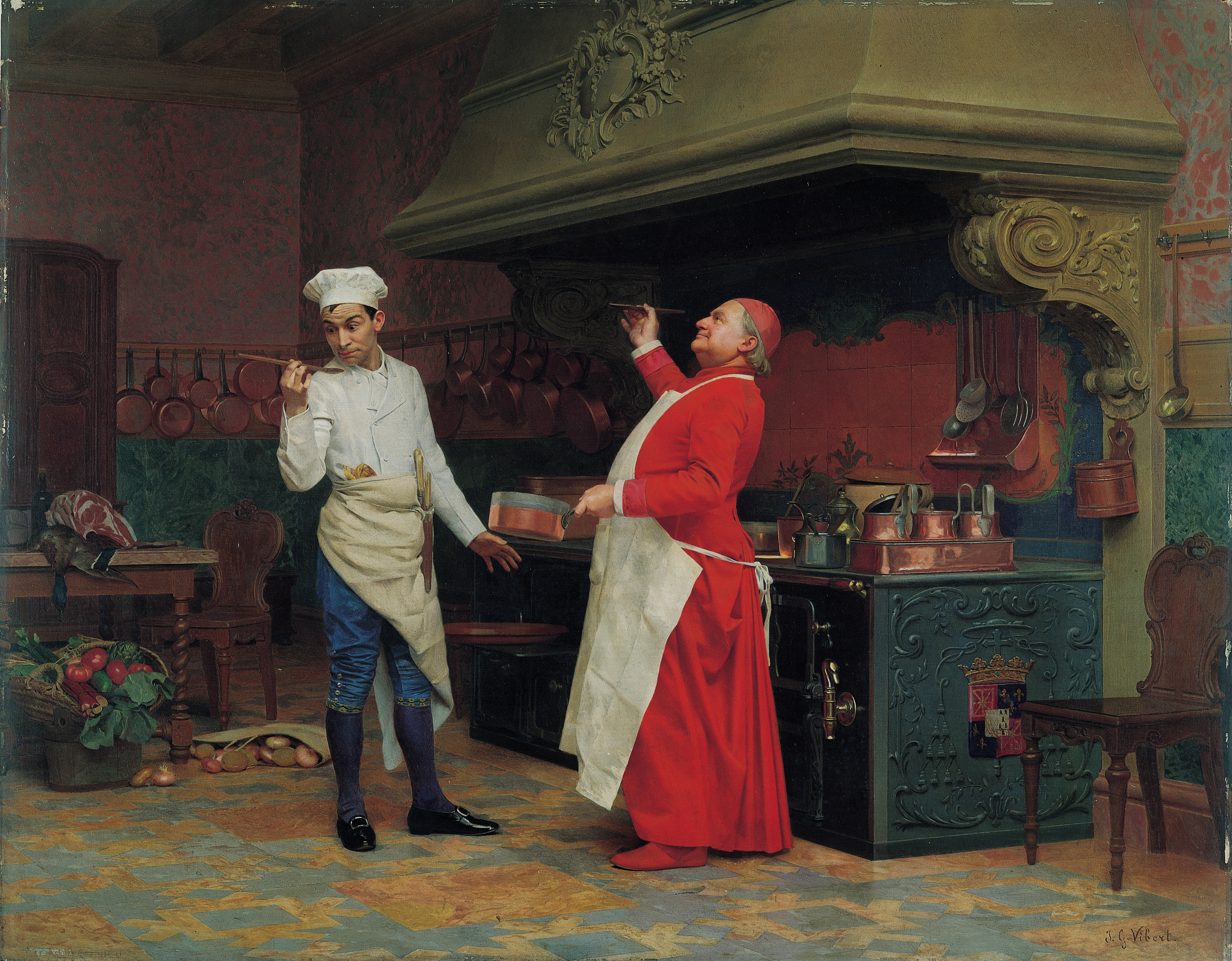
The Marvelous Sauce, c. 1890, Albright-Knox Art Gallery

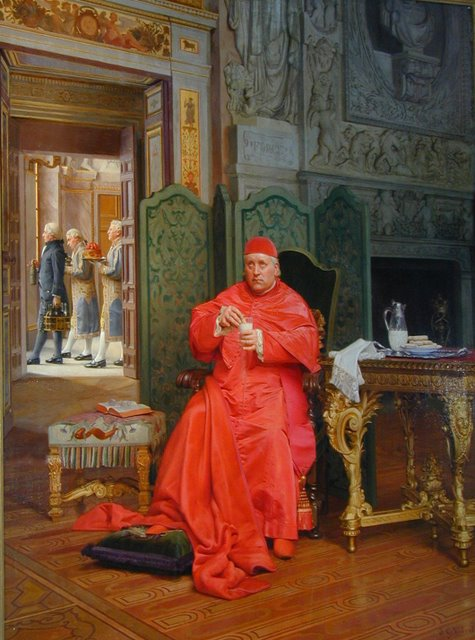
The Diet

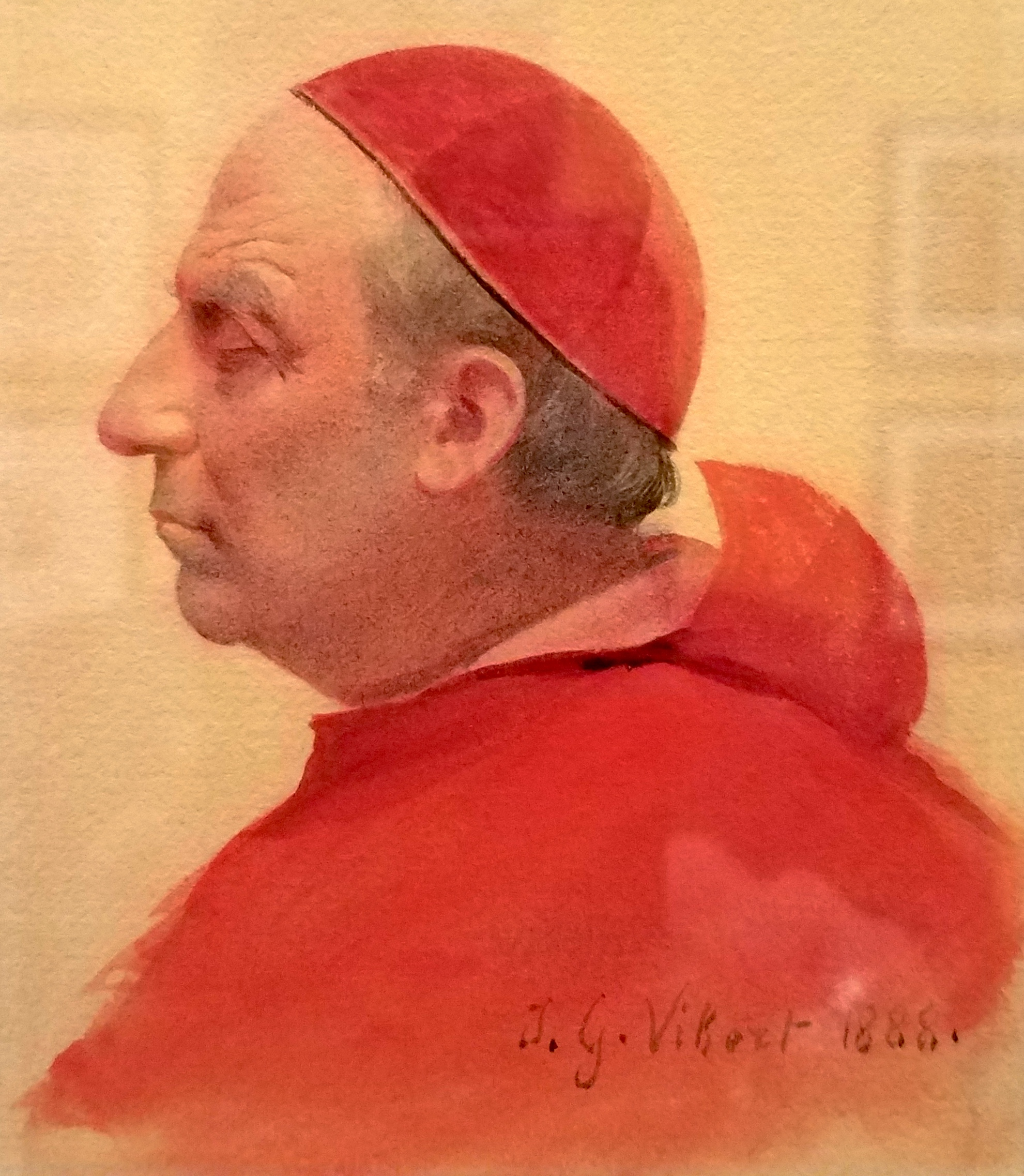
A Cardinal in Profile, 1880, Morgan Library and Museum

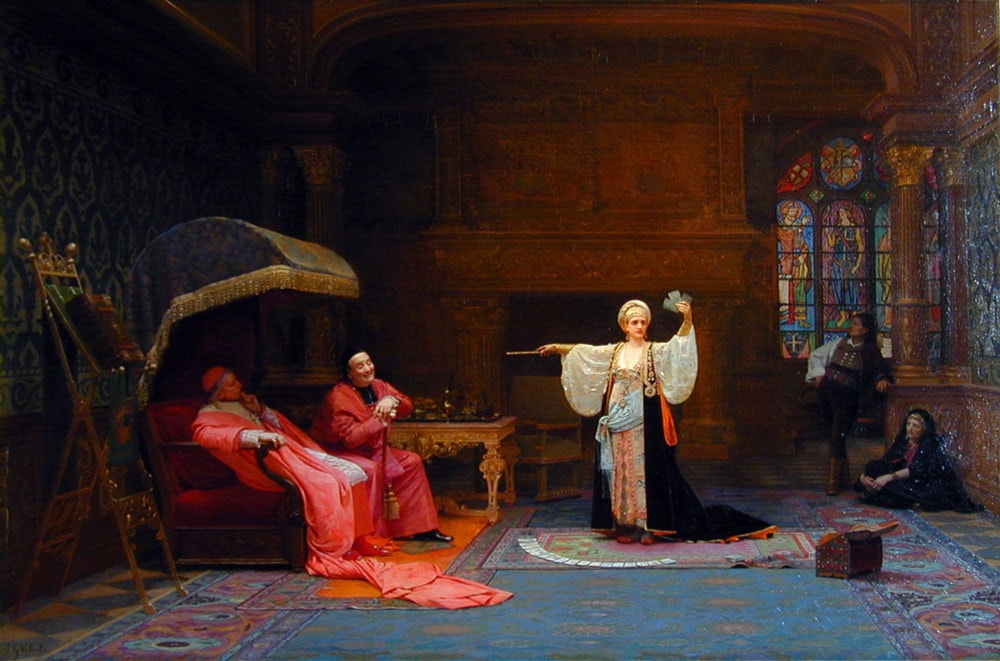
The Fortune Teller

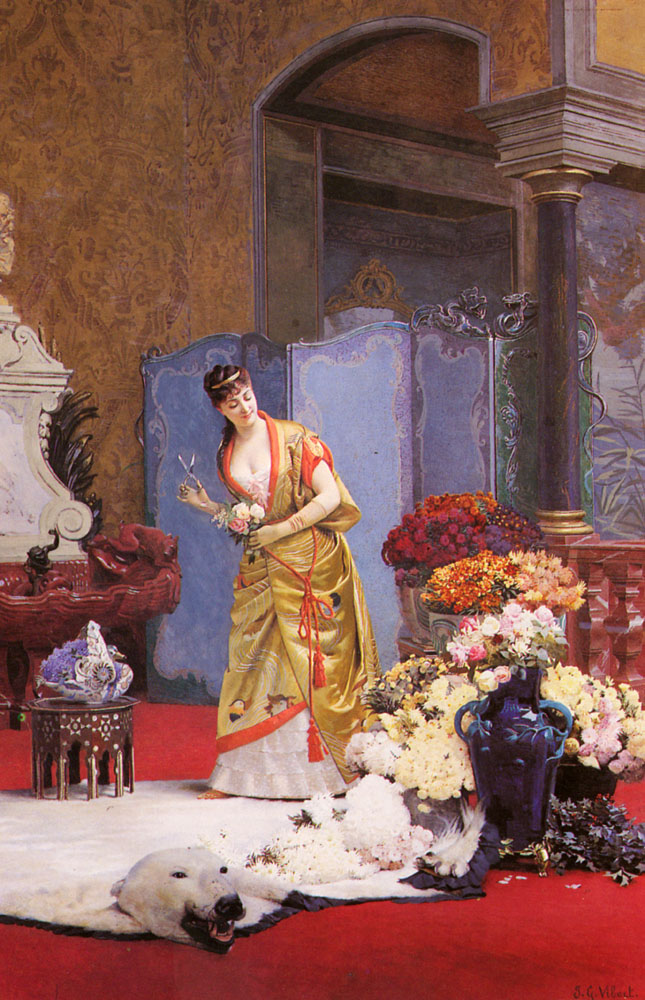
Autumn Flowers

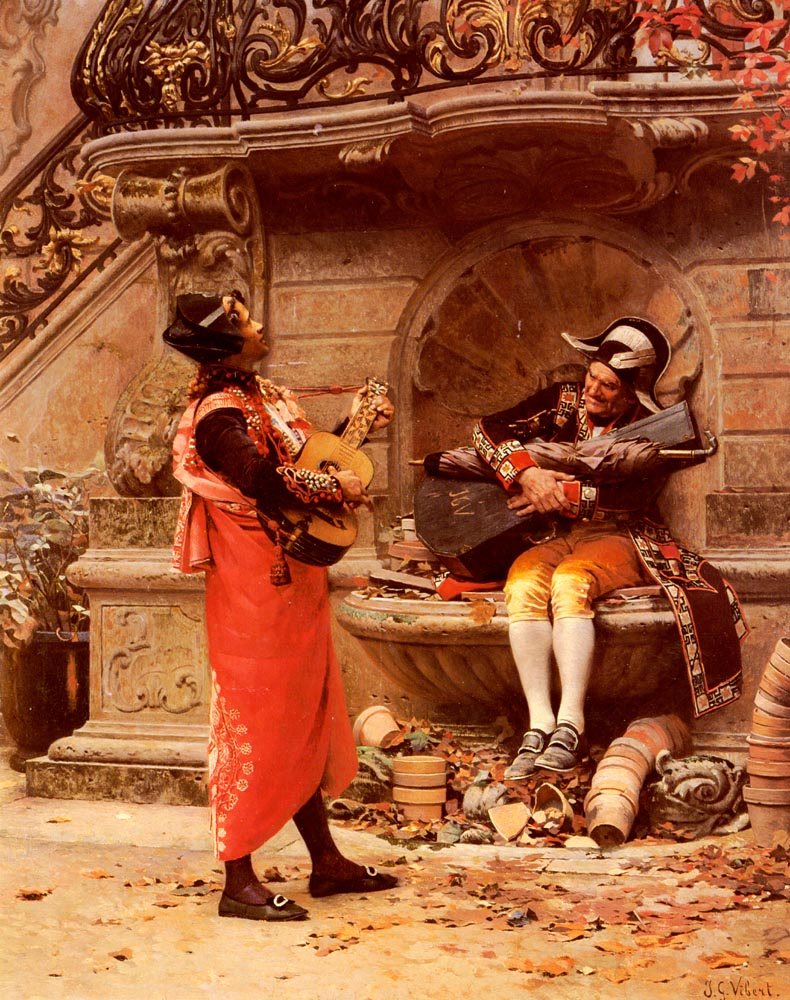
The Serenade

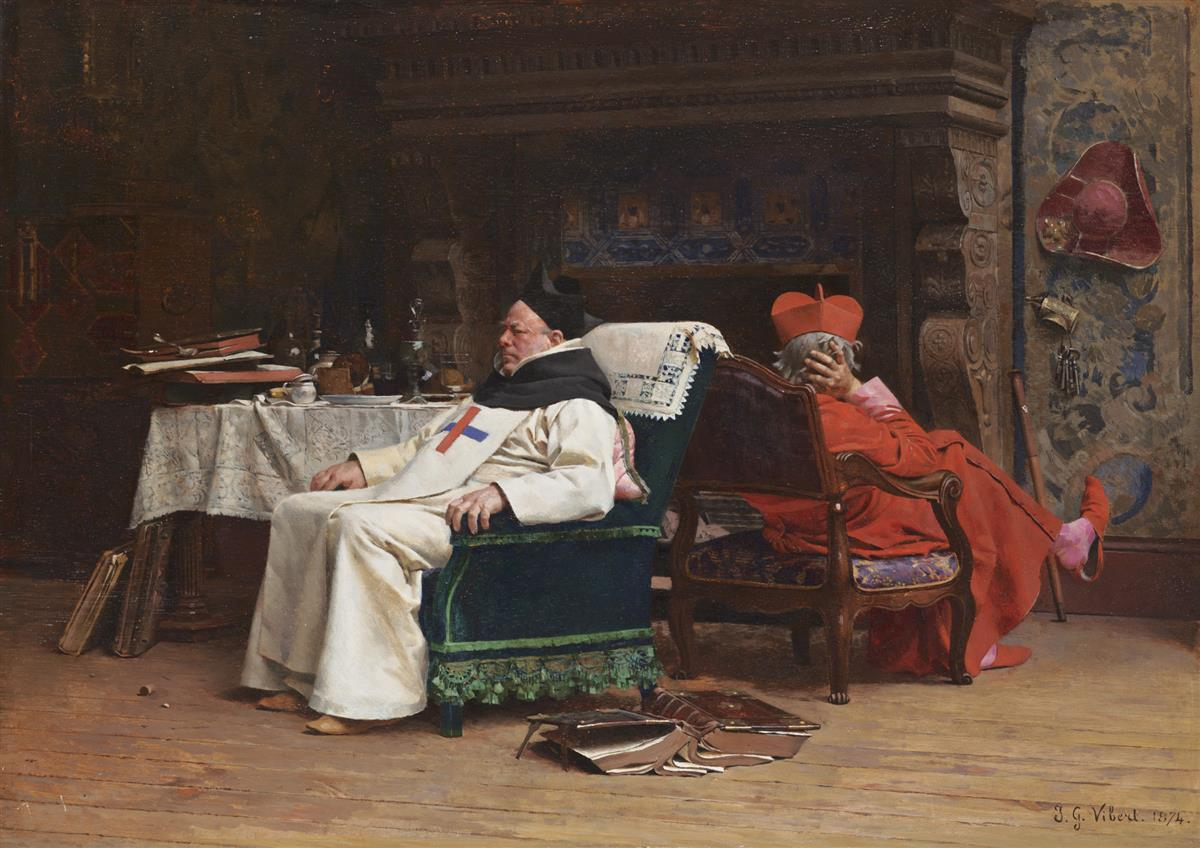
The Schism, 1874, Wadsworth Atheneum

== See also ==
- Legion of Honour
- List of Legion of Honour recipients by name (V)
- Legion of Honour Museum
