= Charles Édouard Delort =

French painter

Charles Édouard Delort (February 4, 1841 – 1895) was a French academic painter who was born in Nimes, France. He grew up in the area around Bordeaux, and entered the naval Academy at 12 years of age. In 1859, he moved to Paris, where he studied with Jean-Léon Gérôme and with Marc-Charles-Gabriel Gleyre.

== Gallery ==
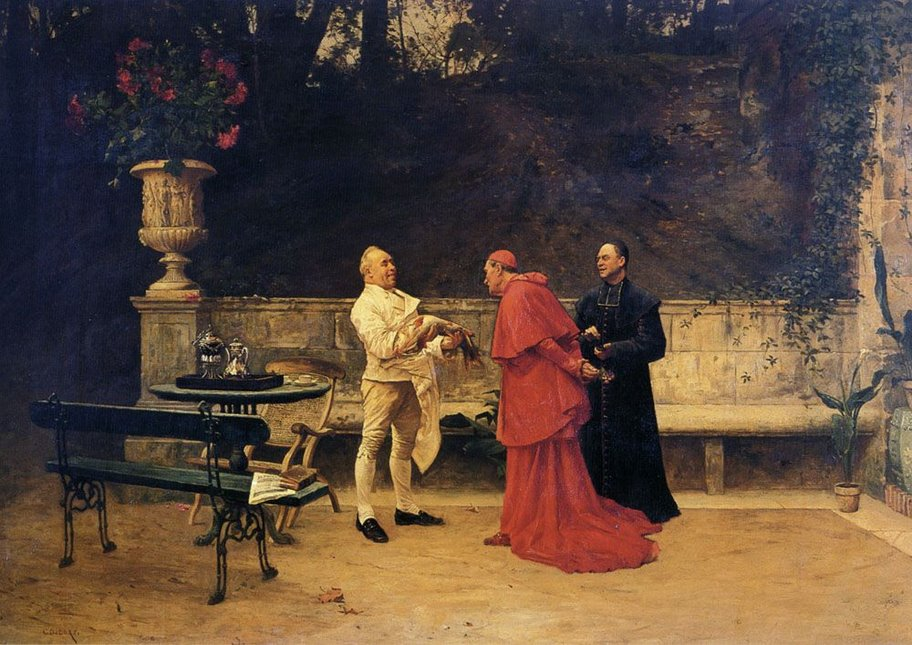
Friday, c. 1900

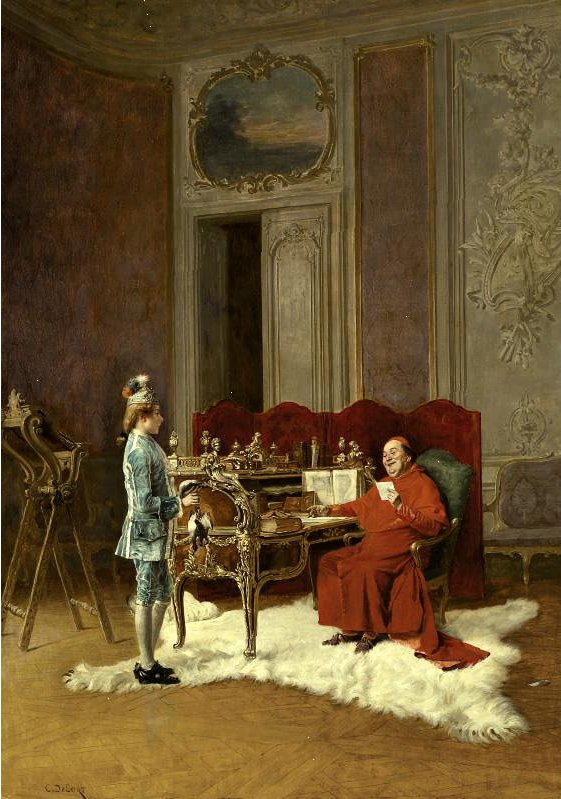
Game for the Cardinal, c. 1900

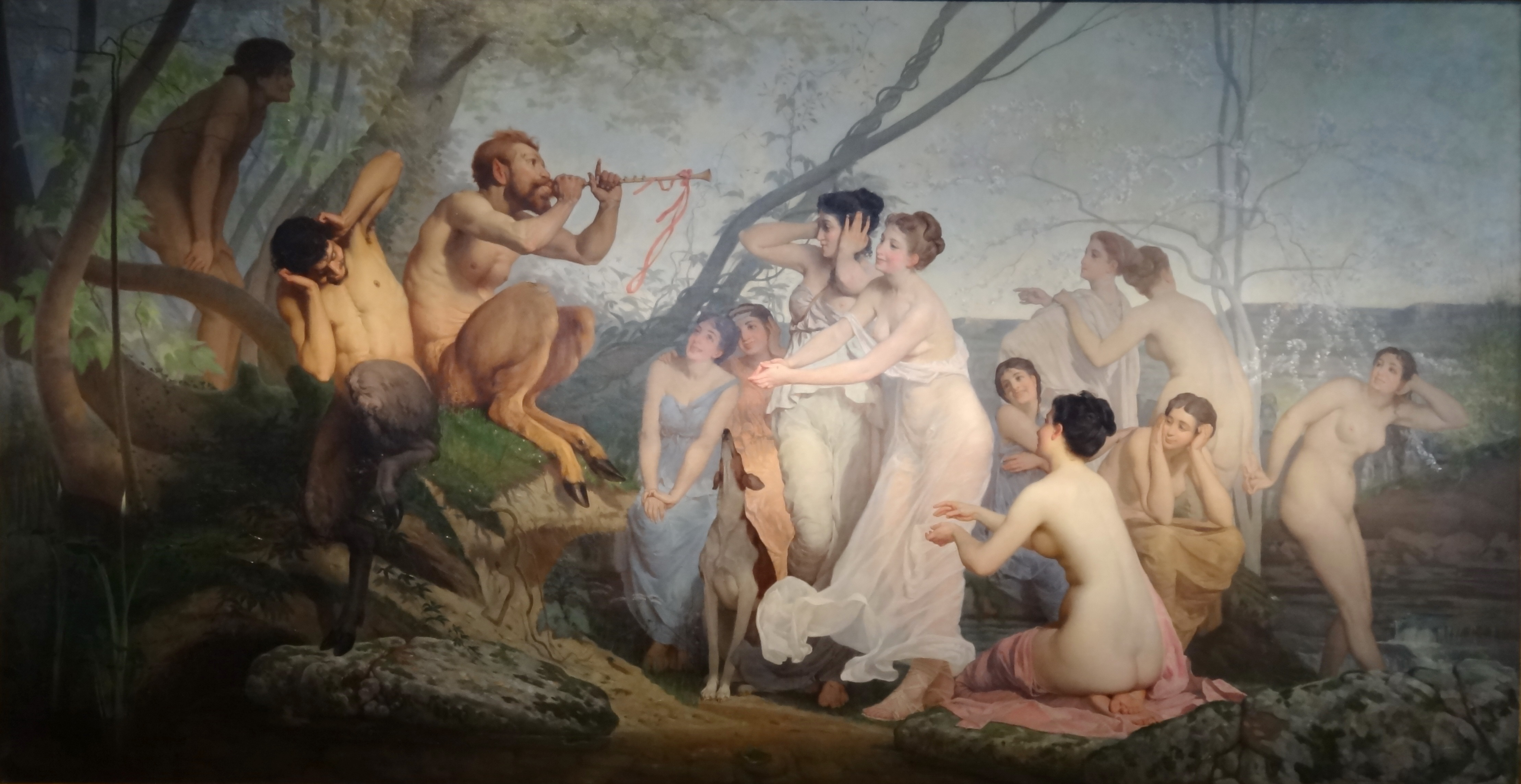
Nymphes et Satyres, 1888, Musée Mandet, Riom
