= Self-Portrait with Two Pupils =

1785 painting by Adélaïde Labille-Guiard

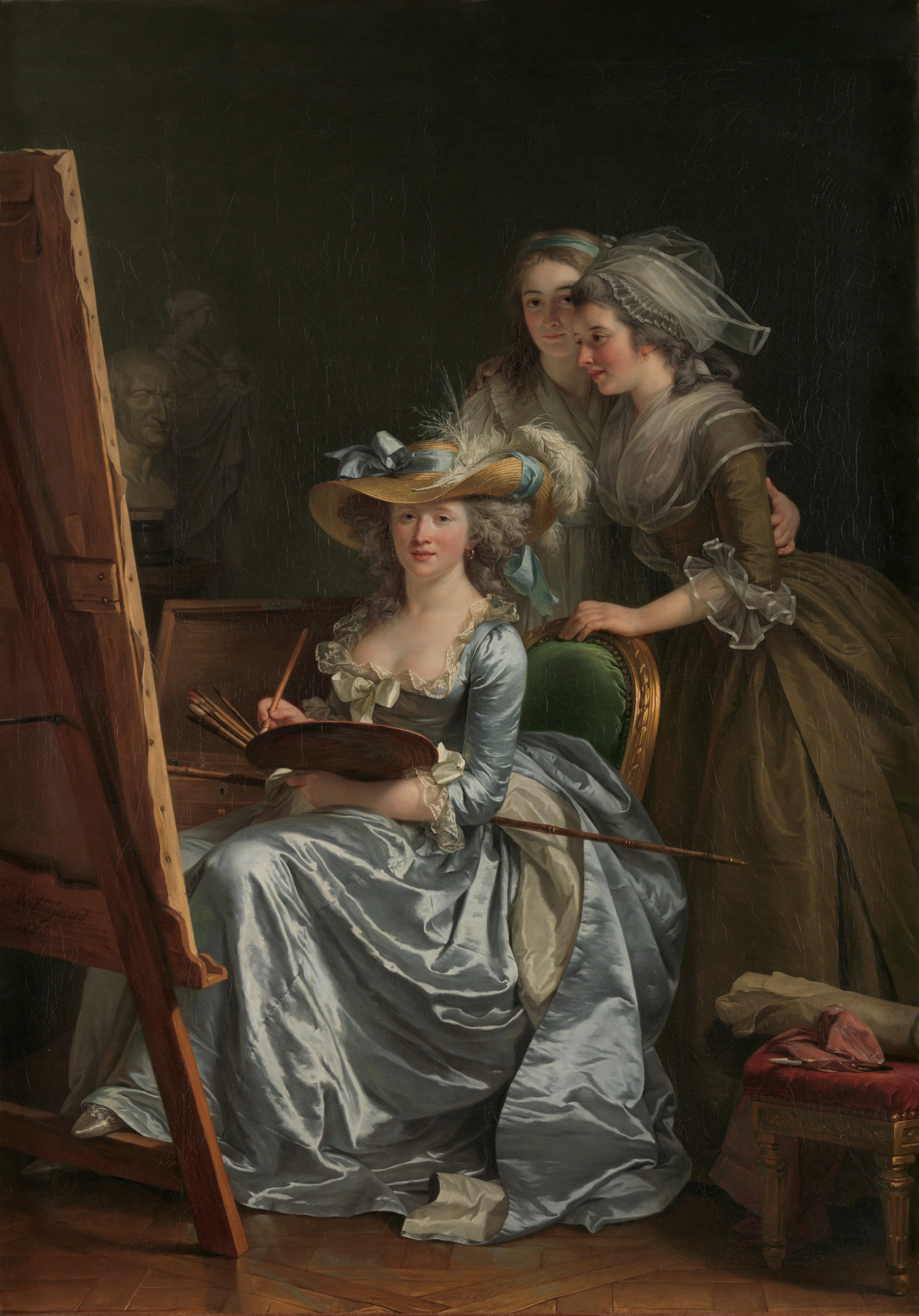
- The artist sitting with Marie-Gabrielle Capet and Marie-Marguerite Carreaux de Rosemond (right)
- Artist: Adélaïde Labille-Guiard
- Year: 1785
- Medium: oil on canvas
- Dimensions: 210.8cm x 151.1cm
- Location: Metropolitan Museum of Art, New York
- Website: The Met

Self-Portrait with Two Pupils, Marie-Gabrielle Capet and Marie Marguerite Carreaux de Rosemond is a 1785 self-portrait painting by Adélaïde Labille-Guiard depicting the artist with two of her pupils, Marie-Gabrielle Capet and Marie-Marguerite Carreaux de Rosemond. It is in the collection of the Metropolitan Museum of Art.

== Early history and creation ==
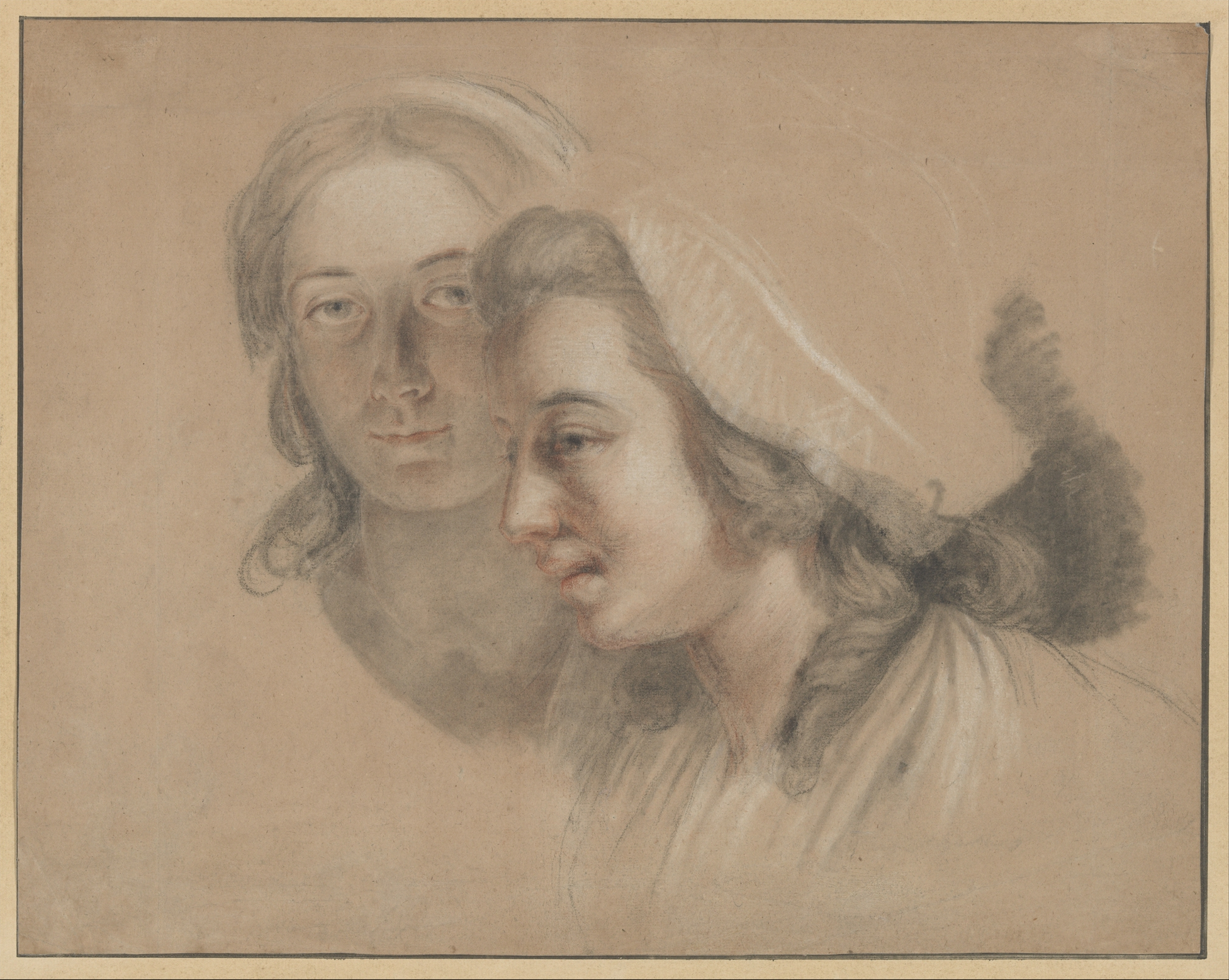
The early chalk study of the two students

Labille-Guiard was born in Paris on 11 April 1749, the youngest of eight children. She grew up in a neighbourhood of artists and, on her own initiative, began painting and receiving training from them. She began to take students of her own in 1780. They were all female, and she was an advocate for women's involvement in painting.

Labille-Guiard spent time planning this painting and there is a chalk study by Labille-Guiard of the two heads of her students where she investigates the closeness of the students heads and the effect of the light. The figure on the left, Marie-Gabrielle Capet, was one of the most talented students and Labille-Guiard's favourite. She lived with the artist even after Labille-Guiard married her first teacher's son, the painter François-André Vincent. The painting shows Labille-Guiard in a gown and straw hat, and she depicts the materials complexity and the reflection of the dress in the parquet floor. The arrangement of the students heads shows her skill in presenting the interplay of light between their faces. The students are less formally dressed, and in the background are statues of a vestal virgin and a bust of the artist's father. The finished painting is almost life-size, and it has been speculated that the artist and one of the pupils are looking at a mirror. In this case, Labille-Guiard is actually painting the very painting the observer sees.

== Later history and display ==
The painting remained the property of the family of the artist until 1905. It was donated in 1953 to The Met by Julia Berwind.

== Description and interpretation ==
The work depicts Adélaïde Labille-Guiard, Marie-Gabrielle Capet and Marie-Marguerite Carreaux de Rosemond. It has been argued that the painting was aimed at the Académie Royale. Labille-Guiard aspired to become a member, and at the time, the Académie Royale limited female new members to four per year. Illustrating two female students argued that more should be accepted into the Académie Royale.

== Influences ==
The structure of the painting with the easel at left suggests that she may have based her composition on Antoine Coypel's Portrait of the Artist with his Young Son, Charles Antoine. This was an important painting in establishing the artists reputation. She was given an allowance by the King, but because of her students she was not given a studio. This painting is thought to have been the basis for Jean-Laurent Mosnier's painting of himself with his young daughters. It is thought that his ambition was to clone the success of this painting.

The painting has been used for book covers, and it is a standard image for many histories of art. It is said to be the earliest known picture of a woman painter with female pupils.

== Bibliography ==
- Auricchio, Laura (March 2007). "Self-Promotion in Adélaïde Labille-Guiard's 1785 "Self-Portrait with Two Students"" (PDF). The Art Bulletin. 89 (1): 45–62. doi:10.1080/00043079.2007.10786329. JSTOR 25067300. S2CID 191484666. Archived (PDF) from the original on 9 August 2017.
- Auricchio, Laura (2009). Adélaïde Labille-Guiard: Artist in the Age of Revolution. Getty Publications. ISBN 978-0-89236-954-6.
