= Marie-Marguerite Carreaux de Rosemond =

French artist (1765–1788)

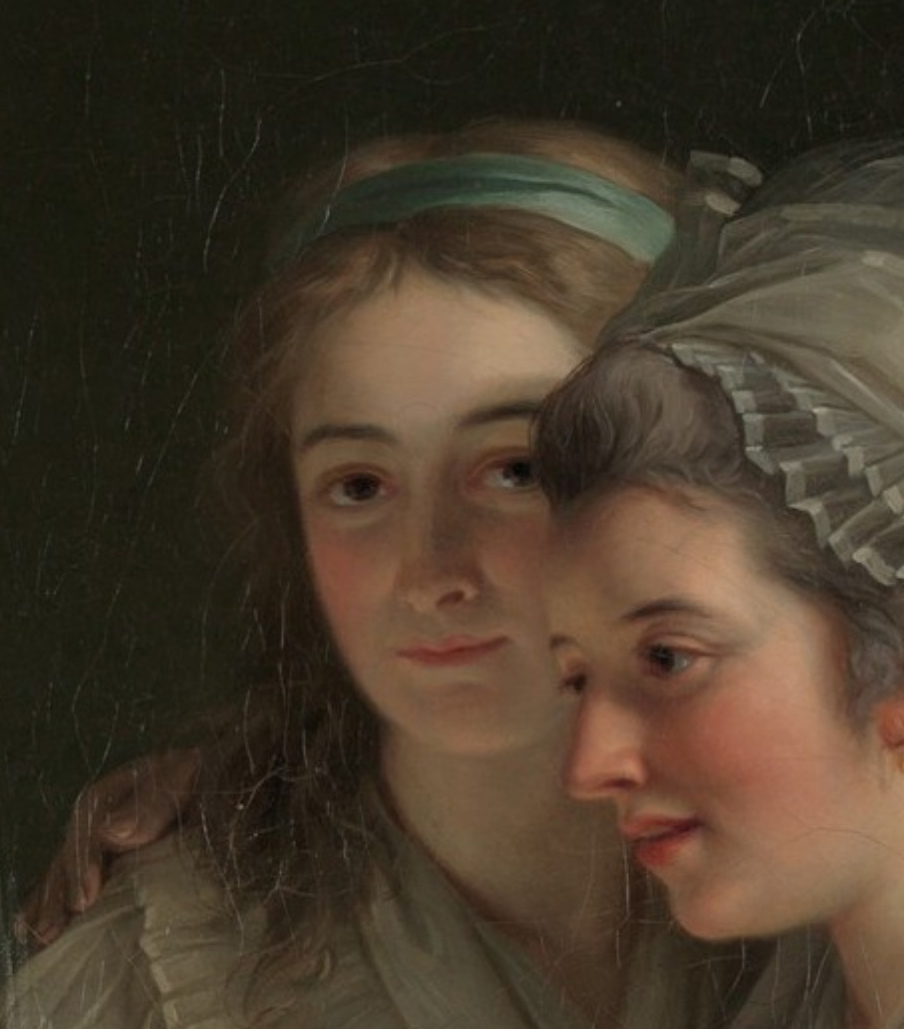
- Detail of Self-Portrait with Two Pupils by Adélaïde Labille-Guiard, 1785. Carreaux de Rosemond is depicted on the left behind Marie-Gabrielle Capet, facing the observer.
- Born: 12 September 1765; Collombey, Switzerland
- Died: 12 November 1788 (aged 23); Paris
- Occupation: painter
- Spouse: Charles Clément Balvay (m. 1788)

Marie-Marguerite Carreaux de Rosemond, sometimes Carraux de Rozemont (1765–1788) was a French painter.

Carreaux de Rosemond was a pupil of Adélaïde Labille-Guiard and one of nine young women whose work was remarked upon at the Exposition de la jeunesse in 1783. She was singled out for praise by the critics alongside Labille-Guiard's other students Marie-Gabrielle Capet and Mlle. Alexandre.

In 1785, Labille-Guiard depicted Carreaux de Rosemond and Capet in her painting Self-Portrait with Two Pupils, now in the Metropolitan Museum of Art. She may also be seen in a pen-and-ink sketch drawn by John Trumbull on a visit to Labille-Guiard's studio in 1786.

Carreaux de Rosemond married engraver Charles Clément Balvay in 1788, but she died later that same year in the galleries of the Louvre as a consequence of giving birth. Her son also died soon after.
