= Marie-Gabrielle Capet =

French painter (1761–1818)

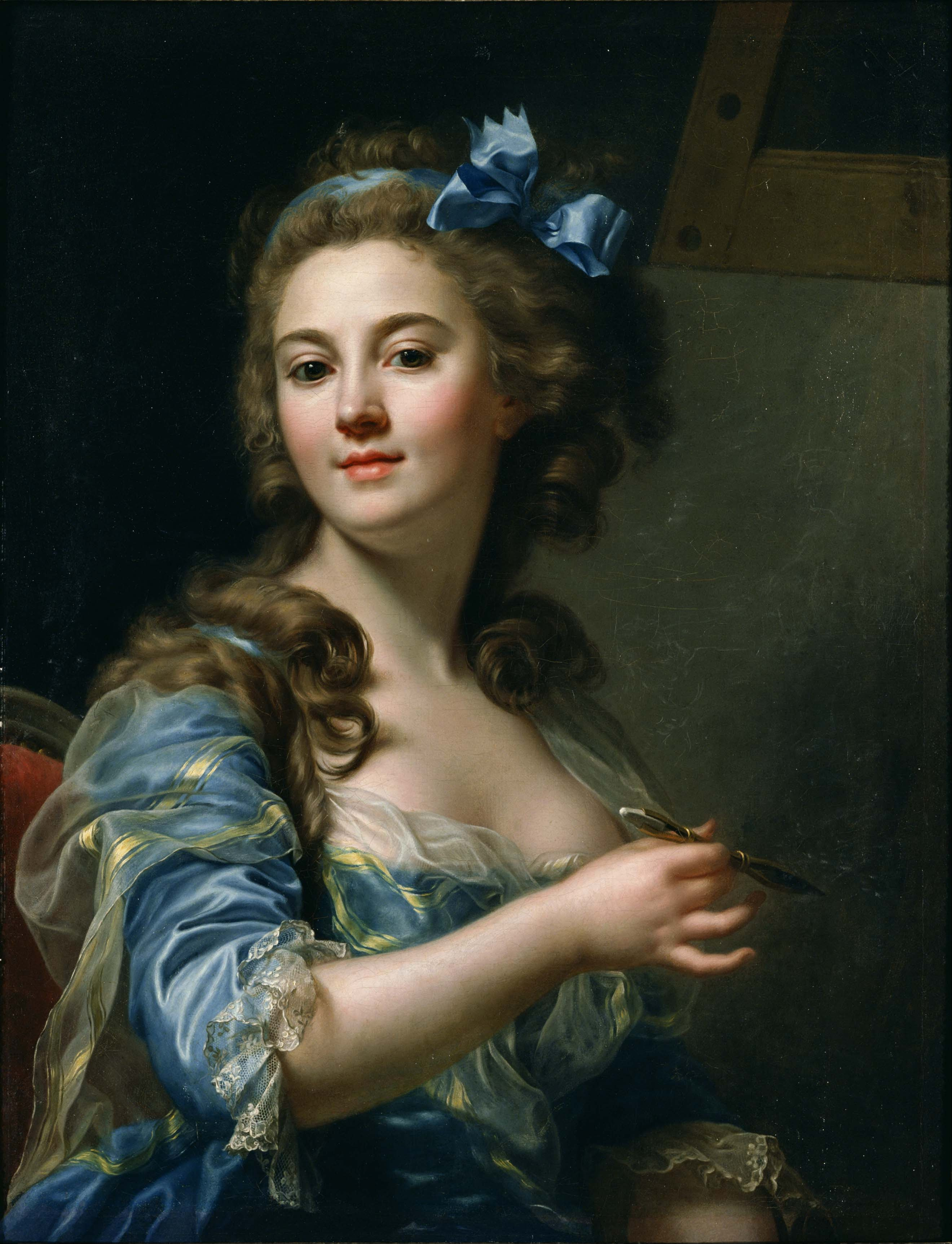
- Self portrait in 1783, in the collection of the National Museum of Western Art in Tokyo
- Born: 6 September 1761; Lyon, France
- Died: 1 November 1818 (aged 57); Paris, France
- Style: Neoclassicism

Marie-Gabrielle Capet (French: [maʁi ɡabʁijɛl kapɛ]; 6 September 1761 – 1 November 1818) was a French Neoclassical painter. Capet came from a modest background, and her previous background and artistic training is unknown. In 1781, she became the pupil of the French painter Adélaïde Labille-Guiard in Paris. She excelled as a portrait painter, and her works include oil paintings, watercolours, and miniatures.

== Life ==
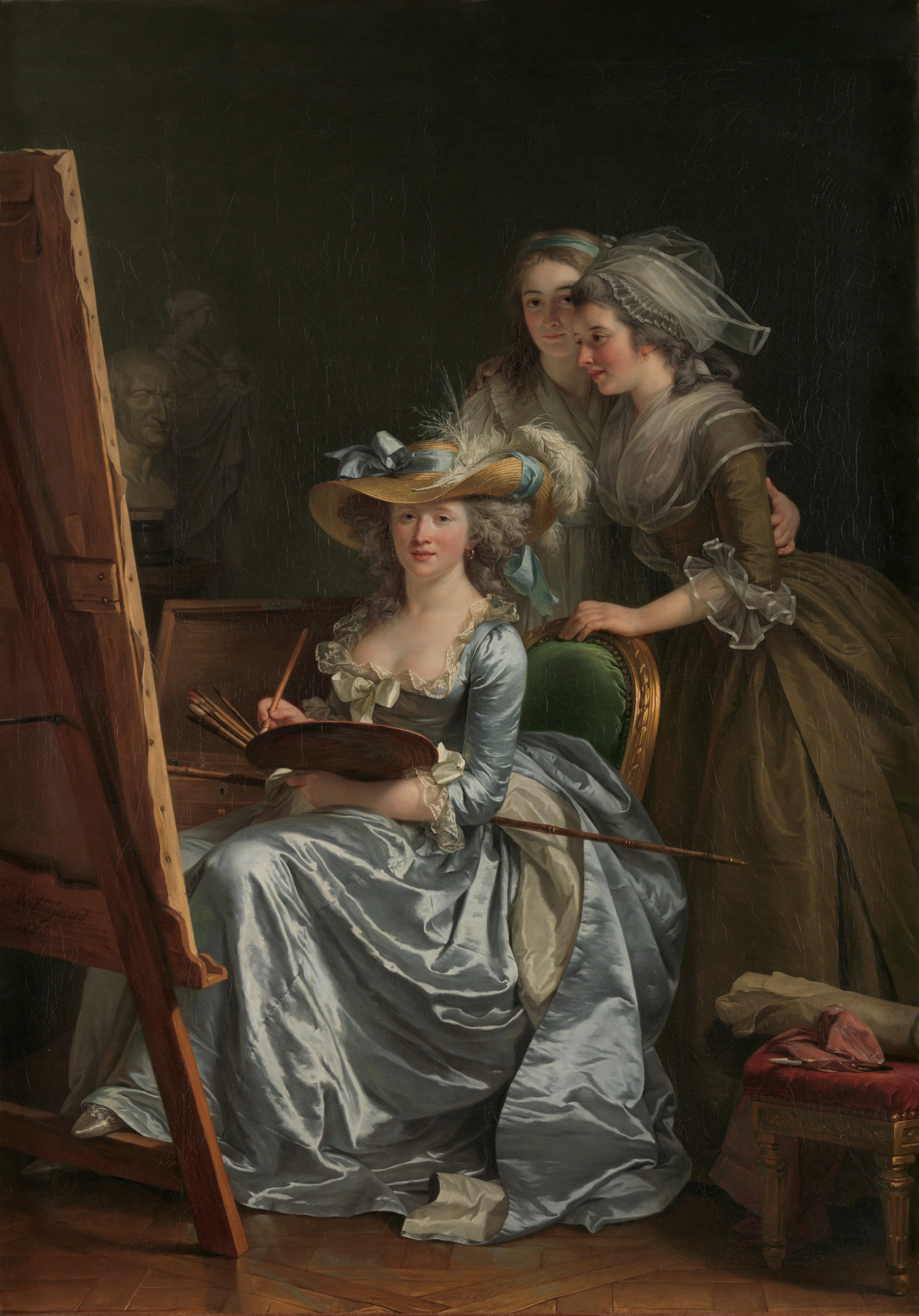
In the atelier of Adélaïde Labille-Guiard. Labille-Guiard, Self-Portrait with Two Pupils. The pupils are Marie-Gabrielle Capet and Marie-Marguerite Carreaux de Rosemond

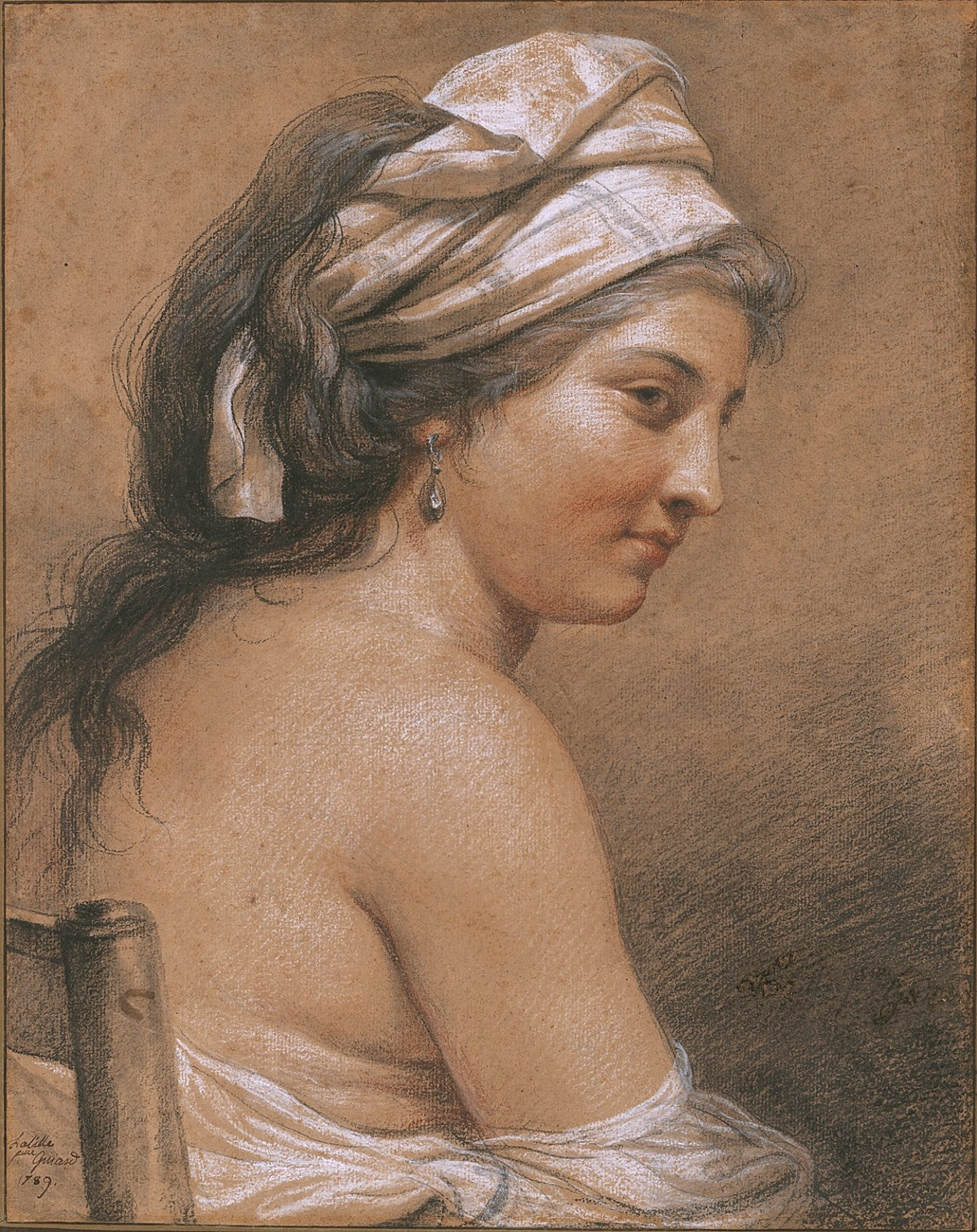
Marie-Gabrielle Capet, by Labille-Guiard

Marie-Gabrielle Capet was born in Lyon on 6 September 1761. In her youth, Capet attended a public drawing school located in her town. In 1781, twenty-year-old Capet moved to Paris to become the student of Adélaïde Labille-Guiard (1749–1803), a Neoclassical artist who was admitted to the Académie royale de peinture et de sculpture in 1783. As her student, Capet assisted Labille-Guiard by modeling, finishing certain sections of paintings, and producing miniature copies of her teacher's oil paintings.

Capet showed her early work at the Exposition de la jeunesse in 1781 and 1783 and later exhibited at the Salon when it was opened to all artists after the French Revolution. Her body of work included miniature paintings, oil paintings, and pastels, which were praised for their virtuoso draftsmanship and use of colour. Many of her pastel paintings were portraits, though by 1808 she was regarded as a history painter in her own right. She counted among other customers several members of the royal family and members of Parisian society, such as the lawyer Pierre-Nicolas Berryer and the playwright Joseph Chénier.

Capet and Labille-Guiard not only enjoyed a professional relationship, but they were also close friends. Capet lived with Labille-Guiard and her husband, the painter François Vincent, in their apartment in the Louvre. After Labille-Guiard's death, Capet continued to live with Vincent until his death in 1816. Upon his death, she purchased Labille-Guiard and Vincent's estate. Capet died in Paris in 1818.

== Works ==
The work of Marie-Gabrielle Capet contains a large collection of miniature portraits, the majority of which are housed in the Louvre. Included in this collection are portraits of Madame Martin de Lesseps; Madame Élisabeth, sister of Louis XVI; and Mademoiselle Mars.

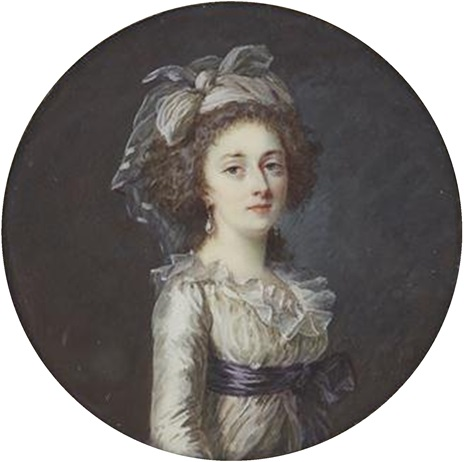
Presumed miniature portrait of Madame Élisabeth by Marie-Gabrielle Capet. 18th Century. Located at the Louvre.

Though little work of Capet is known, there have been some miniatures attributed to her that are speculated to be of Madame Élisabeth, who was famously painted by Labille-Guiard as well. The unsigned miniature that is presumed to be of Madame Élisabeth is located at the Louvre. The miniature depicts a woman in a white muslin dress and a dark sash. Other miniatures signed by Capet have unknown whereabouts.

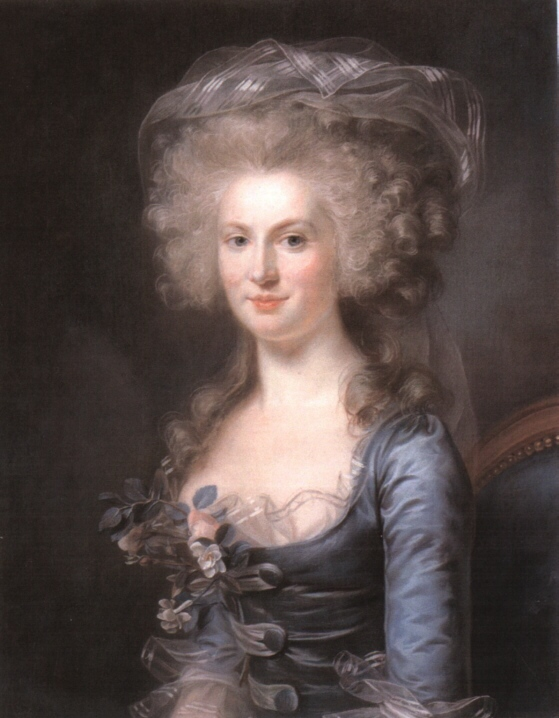
Princess Marie Adélaïde of France, 1785

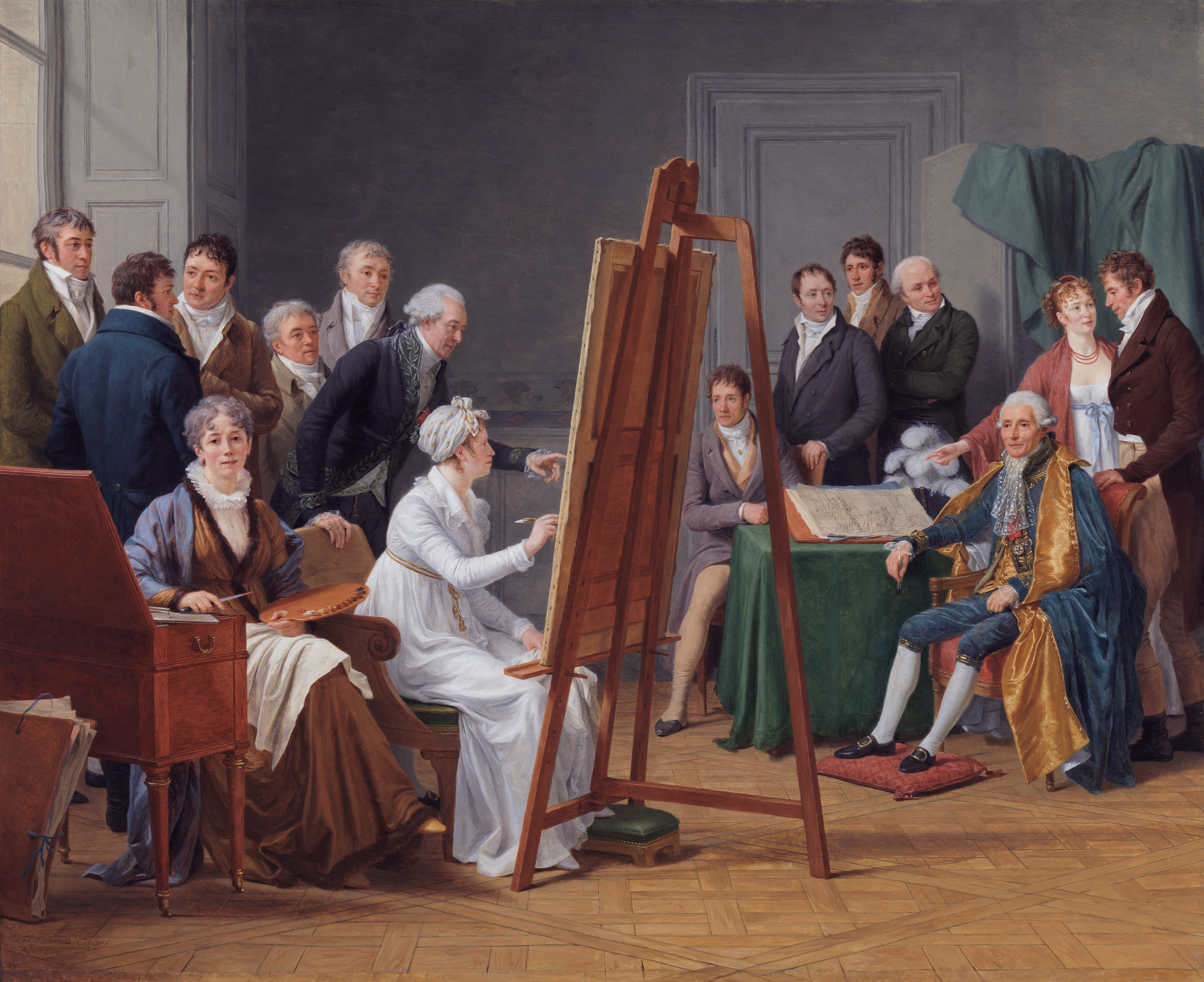
The atelier of Madame Vincent, painting from 1808 now in the Neue Pinakothek, Munich.

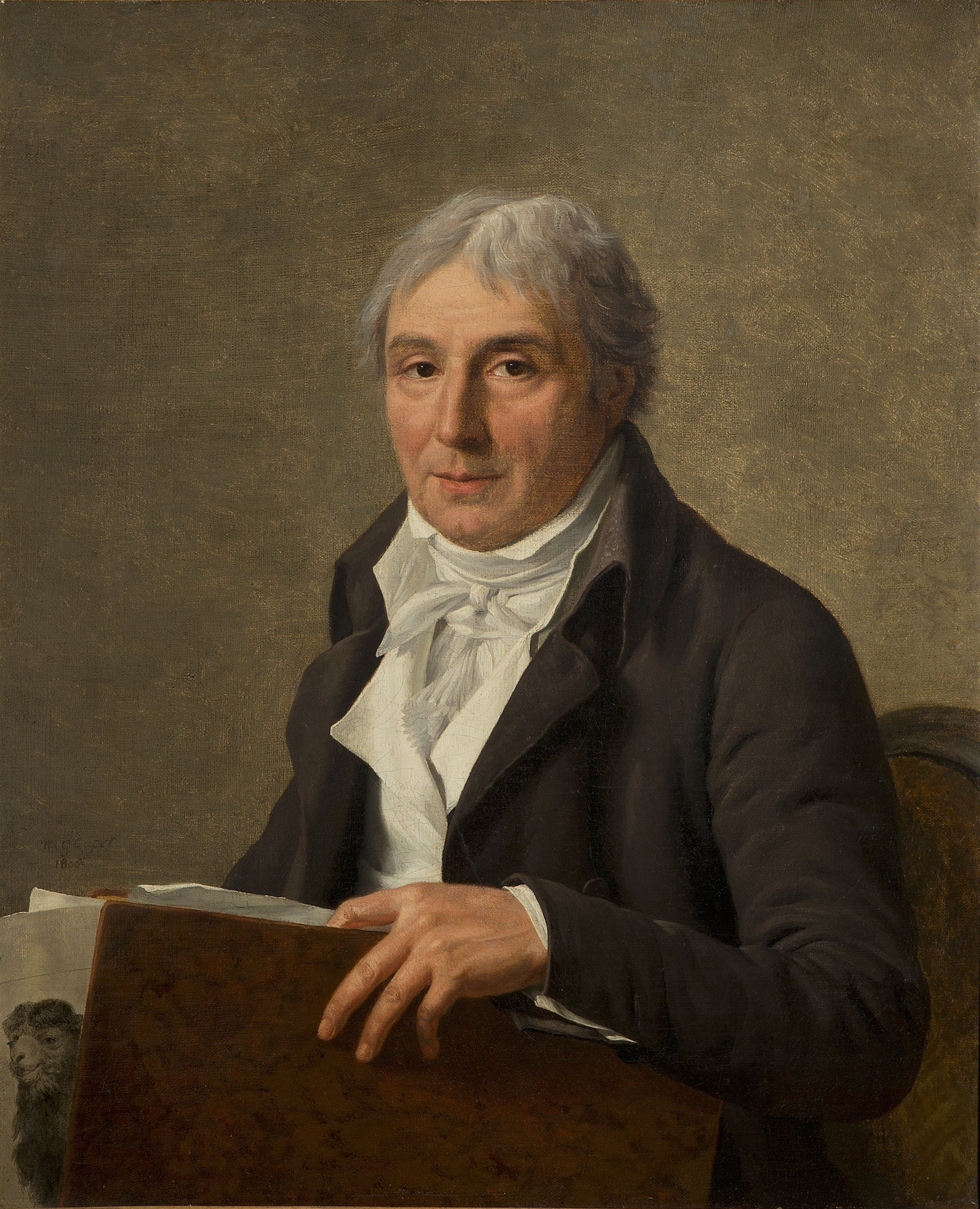
Simon Charles Miger, 1806

== See also ==
- Académie royale de peinture et de sculpture
