= Madame de Selve faisant de la musique =

Painting by Adélaïde Labille-Guiard

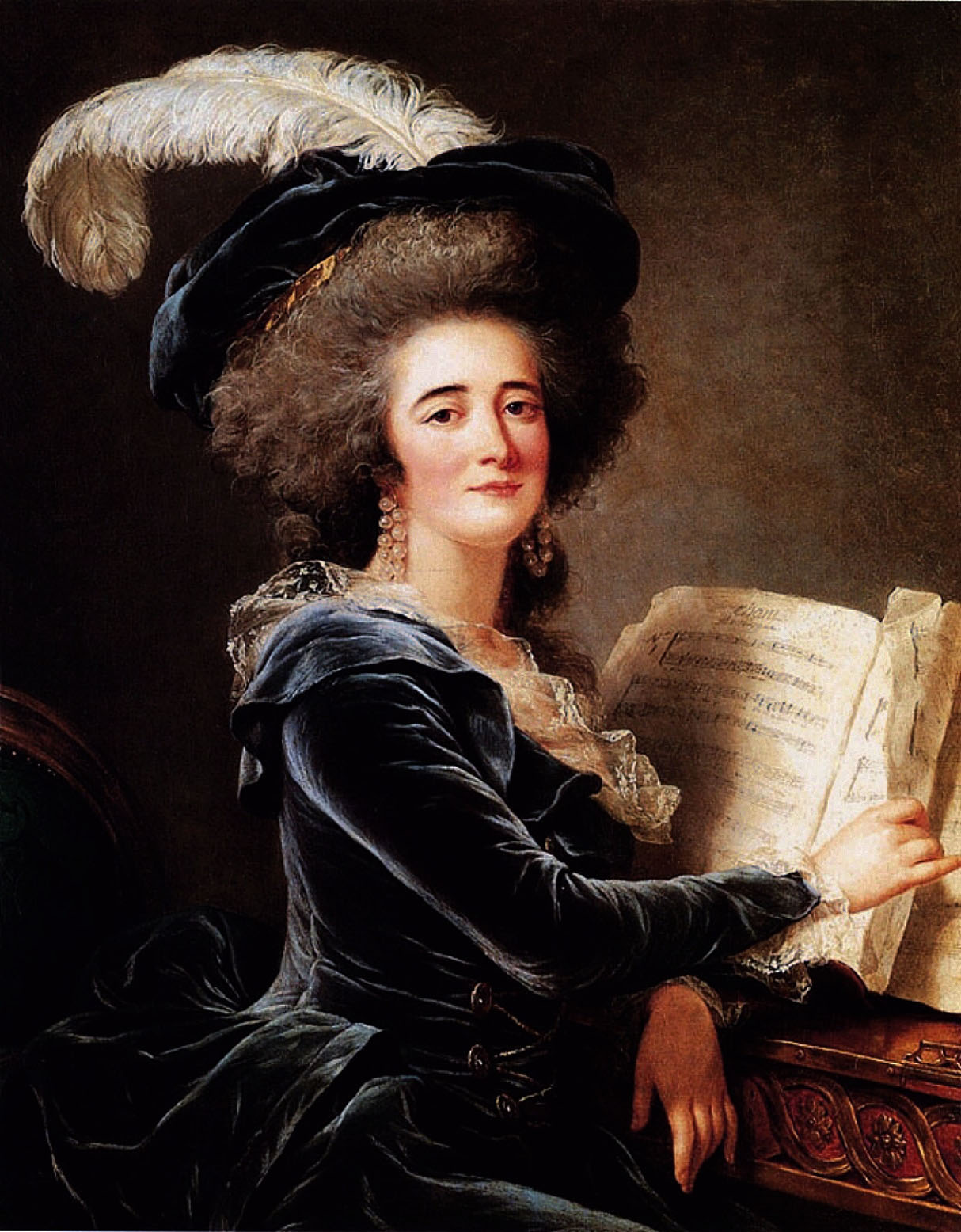
- Artist: Adélaïde Labille-Guiard
- Year: 1787
- Medium: Oil on canvas
- Subject: Madame de Selve
- Dimensions: 90 × 72 cm
- Location: private collection, New York

Madame de Selve faisant de la musique (English: Madame de Selve Making Music) is an oil on canvas painting by French artist Adélaïde Labille-Guiard, from 1787. It was presented at the Salon of 1787, in Paris, and is currently part of a private collection in New York.

The Countess of Selve, widowed at 24, owned the Château de Villiers in Cerny, in what is now Essonne. She is mentioned in Charles Pinot Duclos's (1704-1772) book, Les Confessions du comte de **** (1742).

This portrait sold on 30 June 1927 at the Hôtel Drouot, at the sale of Mme de Polès, for the sum of 510,000 francs (i.e. the equivalent of 32,060,577.14 euros in 2018).
