= François-Élie Vincent =

French painter (1708–1790)

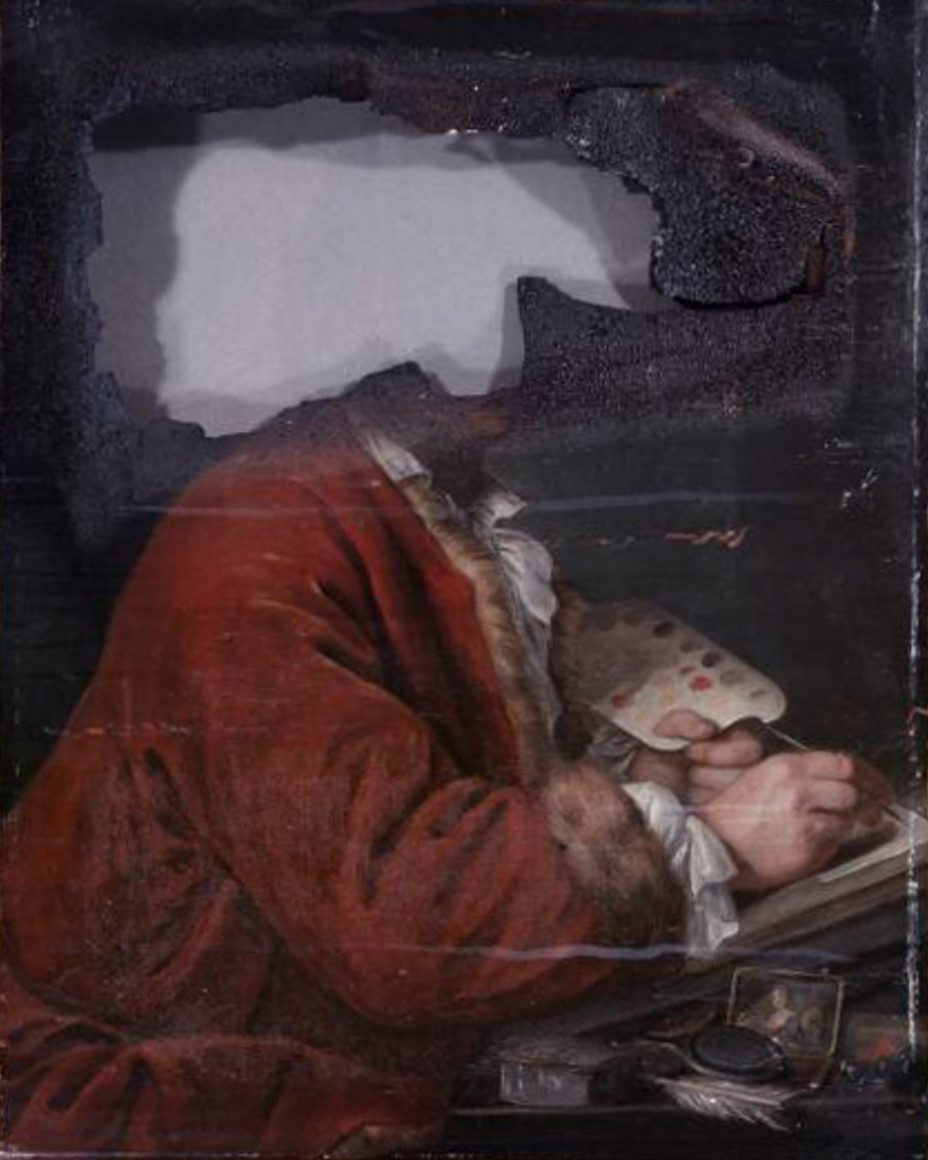
Damaged self-portrait by Vincent, c. 1750–1752 (Musée d'art et d'histoire de Genève)

François-Élie Vincent (20 June 1708 – 28 March 1790) was a French painter of portrait miniatures.

Vincent was born in Geneva and moved to Paris around 1745, where he was active as painter and teacher at the Académie de Saint-Luc. Vincent Among his pupils were his son, François-André Vincent, a notable painter and a leader of the neoclassical movement, and Adélaïde Labille-Guiard, one of the first women to enter the Académie royale de peinture et de sculpture in Paris.

== Sources ==
- "Vincent, François-Élie". Benezit Dictionary of Artists. 2011.
