= List of French engravers =

This is a chronological list of French engravers.

== Renaissance ==
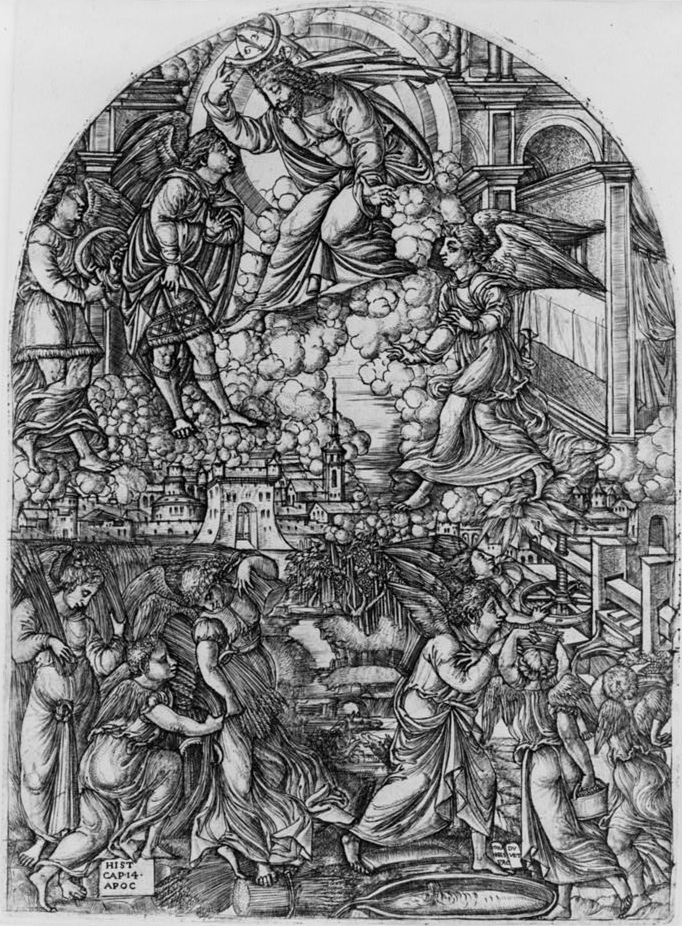
Apocalypse (1550–1560), Jean Duvet

- Geoffroy Tory (1480–1533), humanist and engraver
- Jean Rabel (1545–1603), painter and engraver
- Jean Duvet (c. 1485–c. 1570), engraver
- Jean Cousin the Younger (1490–1561), painter, engraver, sculptor
- Thomas de Leu (1560–1612), engraver
- Jacques Bellange (1575–1616), engraver
- Daniel Rabel (1578–1637), painter and engraver

== 17th-century ==
- François Perrier (1590–1650), painter and engraver
- Jacques Callot (1592–1635), engraver
- Claude Mellan (1598–1688), painter, draughtsman and engraver
- Balthasar Moncornet (1600–1668), painter and engraver
- Abraham Bosse (1602–1676), engraver
- Jean Varin (1604–1672), sculptor, engraver, medallist
- Nicolas Robert (1610–1684), miniaturist and engraver
- François Chauveau (1613–1676), draughtsman, engraver and painter
- Michel Dorigny (1617–1663), painter and engraver
- Jean Le Pautre (1618–1682), draughtsman and engraver
- Jean Marot (1619–1679), draughtsman and engraver
- Albert Flamen (1620–1674), engraver
- Israël Silvestre (1621–1691), engraver
- Robert Nanteuil (1623–1678), engraver, draughtsman and pastelist
- François de Poilly (1623-1693), engraver
- Gabriel Perelle (1604–1677), engraver
- Gérard Audran (1640–1703), engraver
- Jean Mauger (1648–1712), medallist and engraver on copperplate
- Gérard Edelinck (1649–1707), engraver
- Jacques Restout (1650–1701), painter
- Louis Dorigny (1654–1742), painter and engraver
- Eustache Restout (1655–1743), architect, engraver and painter

== 18th-century ==
- Nicolas Dorigny (1658–1746), painter and engraver
- Pierre Drevet (1664–1738), engraver
- Étienne Jehandier Desrochers (1668–1741), engraver
- François Chéreau (1680-1729), engraver
- Charles Dupuis (1685–1742), engraver
- Jean-Baptiste Oudry (1686–1755), painter and engraver
- Jacques Chéreau (1688–1776), engraver and publisher
- Anne Claude Philippe de Tubieres de Grimoard de Pestels de Levis, Comte de Caylus (1692–1765)
- Pierre-Jean Mariette (1694–1774), bookseller and engraver
- Nicolas-Gabriel Dupuis (1695–1771), engraver
- Pierre Imbert Drevet (1697–1739), engraver
- Hubert-Francois Bourguignon Gravelot (1699–1773), engraver
- Jacques-François Blondel (1705–1774), architect and engraver
- François Boucher (1703–1770), painter, engraver
- Jacques-Philippe Le Bas (1707–1783), engraver
- Noël Hallé (1711–1781), painter and engraver
- Pierre-Simon Fournier (1712–1768), engraver
- Jean-Baptiste Marie Pierre (1714–1789), painter, engraver, draughtsman
- Jean-Joseph Balechou (1715–1765), engraver
- Jacques Guay (1715–1787), engraver
- Charles-Nicolas Cochin (1715–1790), engraver and draughtsman
- Joseph-Marie Vien (1716–1809), painter, draughtsman and engraver
- Carmontelle (1717–1806), painter, draughtsman, engraver
- Claude-Henri Watelet (1718–1786)
- Étienne Ficquet (1719–1794), engraver
- Charles Eisen (1720–1778), painter and engraver
- Charles Germain de Saint Aubin (1721–1786), engraver
- Pierre-François Basan (1723–1797), engraver
- Jacques Aliamet (1726–1788), engraver
- Jacques Firmin Beauvarlet (1731–1797), engraver
- Hubert Robert (1733–1808), painter, engraver
- Benoît-Louis Prévost (1735 or 1747–1804), engraver
- Jean-Pierre Houël (1735–1813), engraver, draughtsman and painter
- Simon Charles Miger (1736–1828), engraver
- Jean-Jacques de Boissieu (1736–1810), engraver
- Pierre-François Laurent (1739-1809), engraver
- Jean-Michel Moreau (1741–1814), engraver
- François-Rolland Elluin (1745–1810), engraver
- Gérard van Spaendonck (1746–1822), painter and engraver
- Vivant Denon (1747–1825), diplomat and administrator, writer and engraver
- Augustin Dupré (1748–1833), medallist and engraver
- Charles Eschard (1748–1810), painter, draughtsman and engraver
- P. Jean-Baptiste Bradel (c. 1750–?), draughtsman and engraver
- Michel-François Dandré-Bardon (1752–1809), painter, draughtsman and engraver
- Philibert-Louis Debucourt (1755–1832), painter and engraver
- Charles Clément Balvay (1756–1822), engraver
- François-Nicolas Martinet (c. 1760–1800), engineer and engraver

== 19th-century (Romanticism and Impressionism) ==
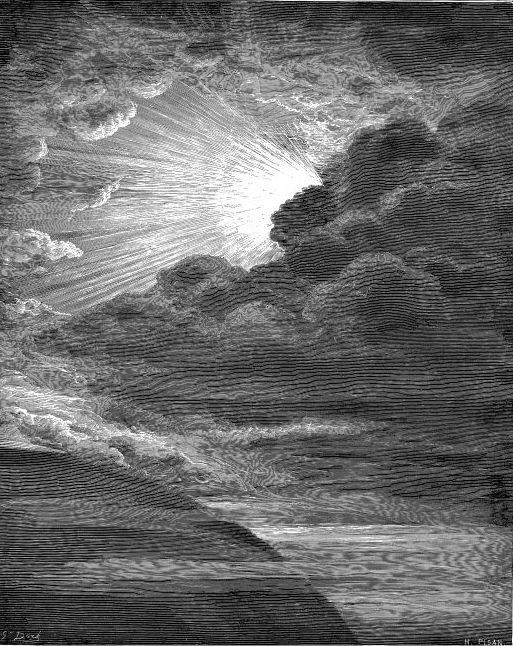
The Creation of Light, Gustave Doré

- Jean Achard (1807–1884), painter and engraver
- Théodore Basset de Jolimont (1787-1854)
- Louis Léopold Boilly (1761–1845), painter, draughtsman and engraver
- Louis Albert Guislain Bacler d'Albe (1761–1824), painter, engraver
- Louis-Pierre Baltard (1764–1846), architect, engraver and painter
- Pierre Audouin (1768–1822), engraver
- Louis-François Lejeune (1775–1848), painter and engraver
- Pierre Bouillon (1776–1831), engraver and painter
- Eustache-Hyacinthe Langlois (1777–1837), painter, draughtsman and engraver
- Auguste Gaspard Louis Desnoyers (1779–1857), engraver
- Henri Laurent (1779-1844), engraver
- Théodore Richomme (1785–1849), engraver
- Auguste-François Michaut (1785–1849), engraver, medallist, sculptor
- François Forster (1790–1872), engraver
- Nicolas-Toussaint Charlet (1792–1845), painter and engraver
- Léon Cogniet (1794–1880), painter, portraitist and lithographer
- Louis-Henri Brévière (1797–1869), engraver
- Louis-Pierre Henriquel-Dupont (1797–1892), engraver and draughtsman
- Charles Philipon (1800–1862), draughtsman, lithographer, journalist and editor
- Achille Devéria (1800–1857), painter, engraver
- Bernard-Romain Julien (1802–1871), lithographer
- Tony Johannot (1803–1852), engraver, illustrator and painter
- Jean Ignace Isidore Gérard (Grandville), (1803–1847), engraver
- Auguste Raffet (1804–1860), draughtsman and engraver
- Eugène Isabey (1804–1886), painter, watercolorist and lithographer
- Espérance Langlois (1805–1864), painter and engraver
- Louis Godefroy Jadin (1805–1882), animal and landscape painter
- Honoré Daumier (1808–1879), painter, engraver
- Karl Bodmer (1809–1893), lithographer, draughtsman, illustrator and painter
- Polyclès Langlois (1813–1872), engraver, draughtsman and painter
- Charles Blanc (1813–1882), historian, art critic and engraver
- Charles Jacque (1813–1894), animal painter and engraver
- Charles Marville (1816–1879), painter, engraver, photographer
- Alphonse Leroy (1820–1902), engraver
- Charles Meryon (1821–1868), engraver
- Hector Giacomelli (1822–1904), painter, watercolorist, illustrator and engraver
- François Chifflart (1825–1901), painter and draughtsman
- Pierre-Auguste Lamy (1827–1880), engraver, lithographer and watercolorist
- Léopold Flameng (1831–1911), engraver, illustrator and painter
- Gustave Doré (1832–1883), engraver
- Edgar Degas (1834–1917), painter, engraver, sculptor and photographer
- James Tissot (1836–1902), painter and etcher
- Henri Fantin-Latour (1836–1904), painter and lithographer
- Jules Chéret (1836–1932), painter, poster artist and lithographer
- Alphonse Legros (1837–1911), painter and engraver
- Adolphe Lalauze (1838–1905), illustrator, painter and engraver
- Jules-Clément Chaplain (1839–1909), engraver
- Odilon Redon (1840–1916), painter, engraver and pastelist
- Fortuné Méaulle (1844–1901), wood-engraver and writer
- Alfred Johannot (1800–1836), engraver and painter

== 19th-century (Impression and Fauvism) ==
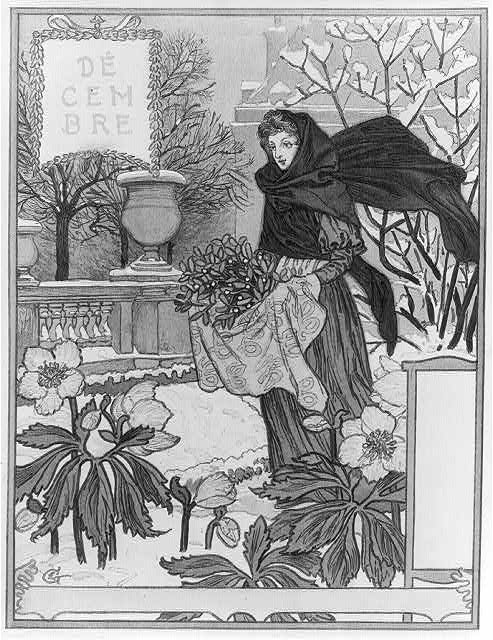
December (1895), wood engraving by Eugène Grasset

- Henri Thiriat (1843–1926), engraver
- Léon Barillot (1844–1929), engraver and painter
- Victor Gustave Lhuillier (1844–1889), engraver and etcher
- Eugène Grasset (1845–1917), engraver, poster artist and decorator
- Pierre Georges Jeanniot (1848–1934), painter, draughtsman, watercolorist, and engraver
- Eugène Carrière (1849–1906), painter and lithographer
- Auguste-Louis Lepère (1849–1918), painter and engraver
- Jean-Louis Forain (1852–1931), painter, illustrator and engraver
- Adolphe Willette (1857–1926), illustrator, caricaturist and engraver
- Théophile Alexandre Steinlen (1859–1923), painter, draughtsman and lithographer
- George Auriol (1863–1938), journalist, poet, painter and engraver
- Henri Bellery-Desfontaines (1867–1909), painter, illustrator, poster artist, lithographer, draughtsman, architect and engraver
- Edgar Chahine (1874–1947), painter, illustrator and engraver
- Charles Dufresne (1876–1938), painter, engraver and decorator

== 20th-century (before World War II) ==
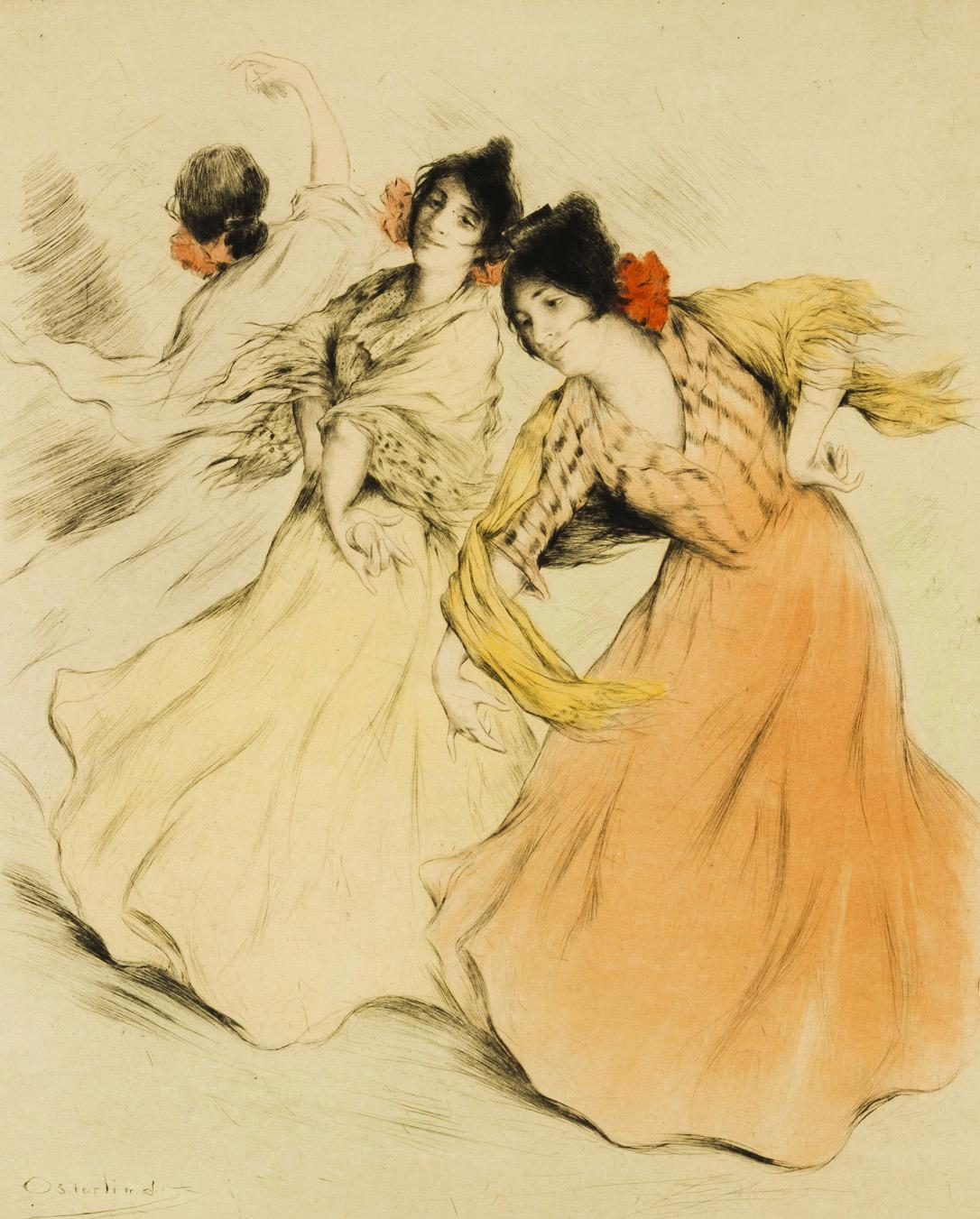
Allan Österlind , Danseuse de flamenco, eau-forte et aquatinte sur papier

- Abel Mignon (1861–1936), engraver
- Allan Österlind (1855–1938), painter and engraver
- Malo-Renault (1870–1938) illustrator, color engraver and pastelist
- Jacques Villon (1875–1963), painter and engraver
- Adolphe Beaufrère (1876–1960), painter and engraver
- Raoul Dufy (1877–1953), painter, draughtsman, illustrator, ceramist, decorator and engraver
- Henry Cheffer (1880–1957), painter and engraver
- Raoul Serres (1881–1971), illustrator and engraver
- Marie Laurencin (1883–1956), painter and engraver
- Jean Metzinger (1883–1956), painter, engraver

== 20th-century (post-World War II) ==
- Henri-Georges Adam (1904–1967), engraver and sculptor
- Pierre Albuisson (1952–), draughtsman and engraver
- Hans Bellmer (1902–1975), sculptor, photographer, engraver
- Jean Bertholle (1909–1996), painter
- Érik Desmazières (1948-), engraver
- Johnny Friedlaender (1912–1992), painter and engraver
- Henri Goetz (1909–1989), painter and engraver
- Cécile Guillame (1933–2004), engraver
- Max Leognany (1913–1994), painter, engraver, sculptor
- Ève Luquet (1954–), designer and engraver
- Jeanne Malivel (1895–1926), decorator and engraver
- Alfred Manessier (1911–1993), painter
- Gen Paul (1898–1975), painter, engraver
- René Quillivic (1925–2016), sculptor and engraver
- Alfred-Georges Regner (1902–1987), painter and engraver
- Pierre-Yves Trémois (1921–), painter, engraver and sculptor
- Raoul Ubac (1910–1985), painter
- Zao Wou-Ki (1921–2013), photographer, calligrapher, sculptor, engraver

== See also ==
- Category:French engravers
- List of French painters
- List of French artists
