= Pierre Audouin =

French engraver (1768–1822)

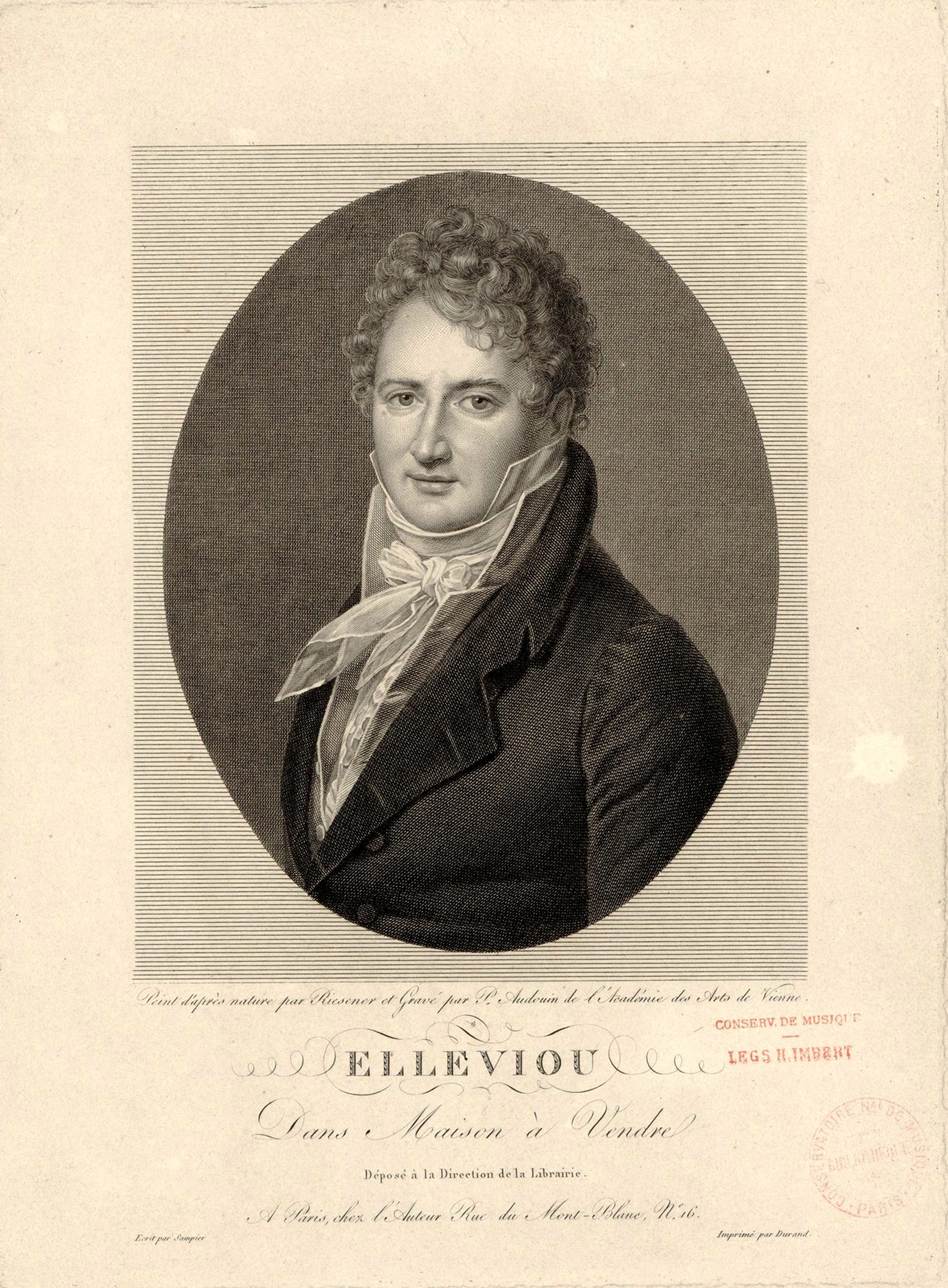
Henri-François Riesener by Pierre Audouin, Bibliothèque nationale de France, 1800

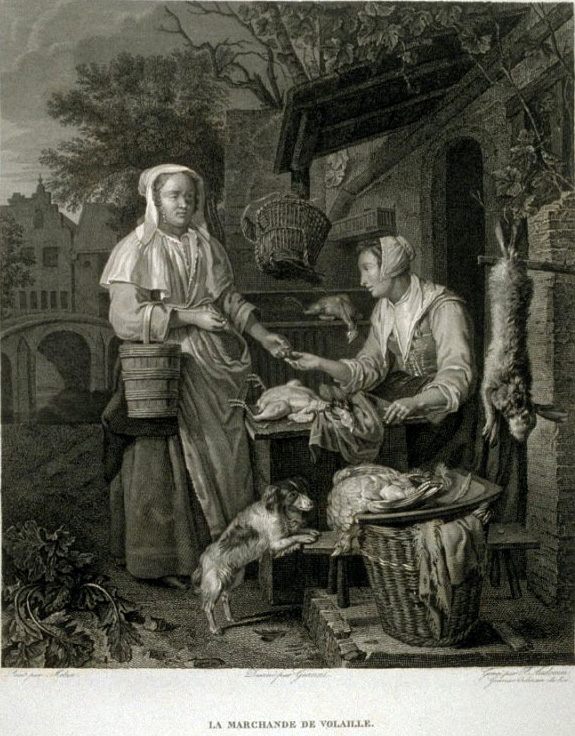
"La Marchande de Volaille," painting by Gabriel Metsu; engraved by Pierre Audouin from the drawing by Felice Giani (image 31 x 26.8 cm); published in Le Musée Royal, second series of Le Musée français, 1821.

Pierre Audouin (1768–1822) was a French engraver, and pupil of Beauvarlet.

Audouin was born in Paris, where he lived and worked his whole life. He was married to Anne Laurent, the daughter of the engraver, Pierre Laurent, and he engraved altogether 18 large plates for Laurent's publication Le Musée Français, after paintings by French, Italian and Dutch masters and classical sculpture. After 1804, he often signed his work as a member of the Academy of Arts of Vienna ("l'Académie des arts de Vienne"), and in 1810 he held the title "Engraver of the Emperor's mother" (graveur de madame Mère, i.e. Letizia Bonaparte). He was active as a portrait engraver until the end of his life. The following are some of his works:

- Jupiter and Antiope; after Correggio.
- La belle Jardiniere; after Raphael, engraved from a drawing by Pierre-Paul Prud'hon for Le Musée français, issued 1803.
- Double portrait called Raphael and his Fencingmaster (Raphael et son Maitre d’Armes); ascribed to Raphael, for Le Musée français, issued 1805.
- The Entombment of Christ; after Caravaggio, from a drawing by F. Giani, issued in Le Musée français, 1809.
- Charity; after Andrea del Sarto, from a drawing by Pierre Bouillon, issued in Le Musée royal, 1813.
- Melpomene, Erato, and Polyhymnia; after Le Sueur, for Le Musée français.
- Three subjects after Terborch; two after Metzu, one after Mieris; and one after Netscher—for Le Musée français and Le Musée royal.
- Marie Therese Charlotte, Duchess of Angouleme; after Dermont.
- Madame Le Brun; after herself.
- Louis XVIII in his coronation robes; after Le Gros.
