= Alphonse Leroy =

Alphonse Leroy may refer to:

- Alphonse Leroy (physician) (1742–1816), French doctor
- Alphonse Leroy (engraver) (1820–1902), French engraver and photographer
