= Nicolas de Fer =

French cartographer and geographer

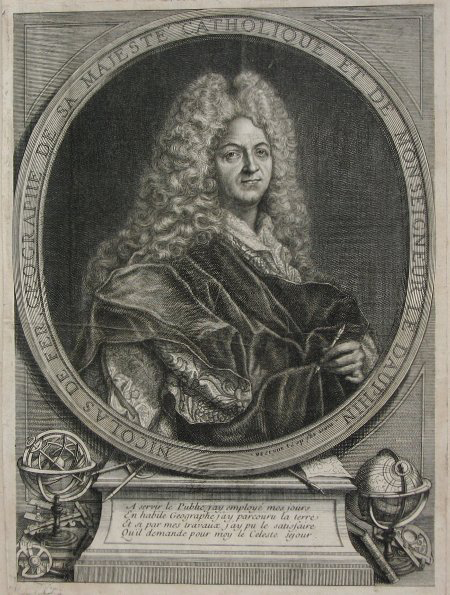
- Engraving of Nicolas de Fer by Jaques-François Bénard
- Born: 1646
- Died: 25 October 1720 (aged 73–74); Paris, France
- Occupations: cartographer, geographer, engraver, publisher
- Parent(s): Antoine and Geneviève

Nicolas de Fer (French pronunciation: [nikɔla də fɛʁ], 1646 – 25 October 1720) was a French cartographer and geographer. He also was an engraver and publisher. His works focused more on quantity than quality, there were often geographical errors, and they were more artistic than accurate.

== Early life ==
De Fer was the youngest of three sons of Antoine de Fer, who was also a cartographer. When he was 12, he became the apprentice of Parisian engraver Louis Spirinx, and made his first map, of the Canal du Midi, at the age of 23. After the death of his father in June 1673, his mother Geneviève initially took over the map making company, which had begun to decline. She passed it and the atelier, called Quai de L'Horloge, on to Nicolas in 1687 because of her old age.

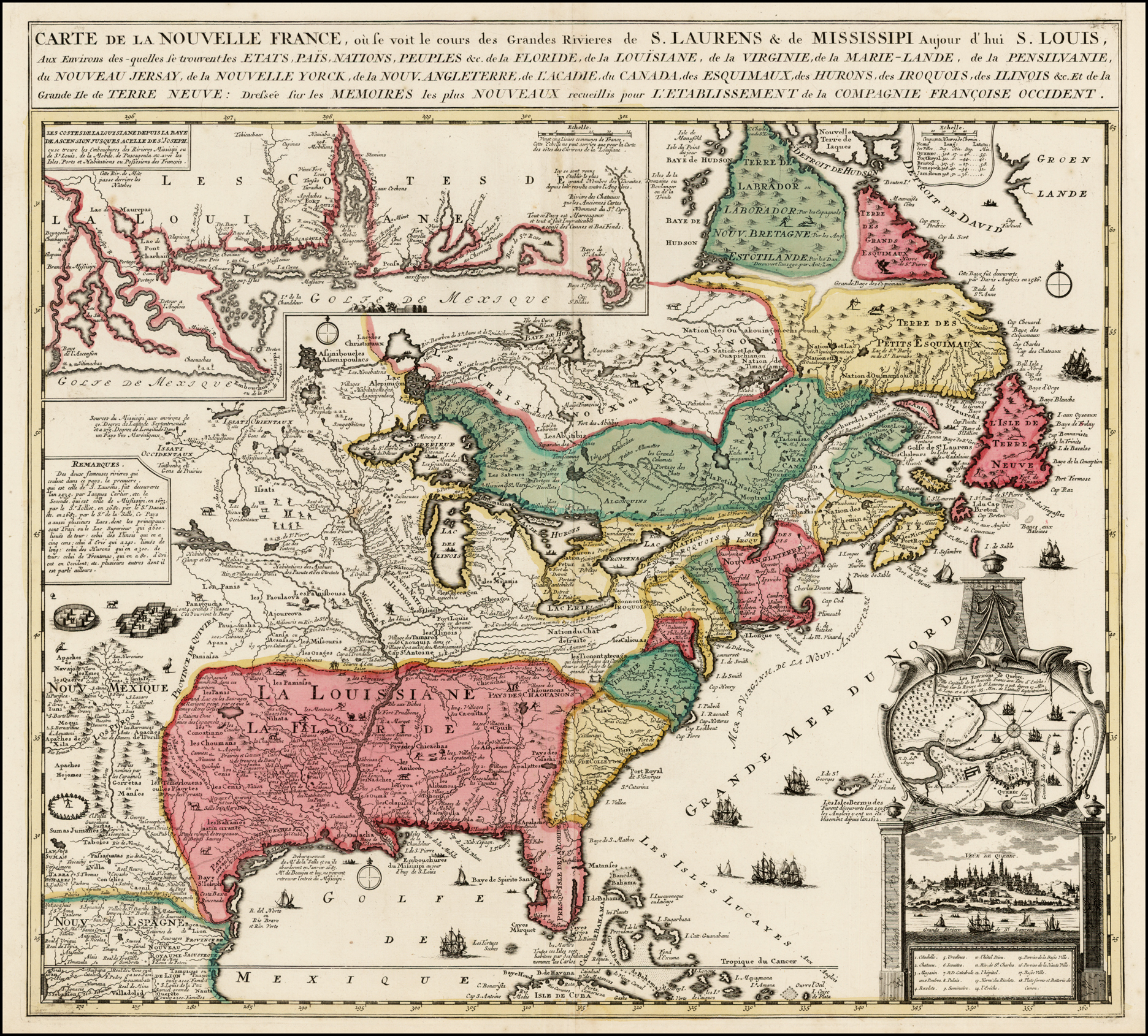
Carte De La Nouvelle France, 1719

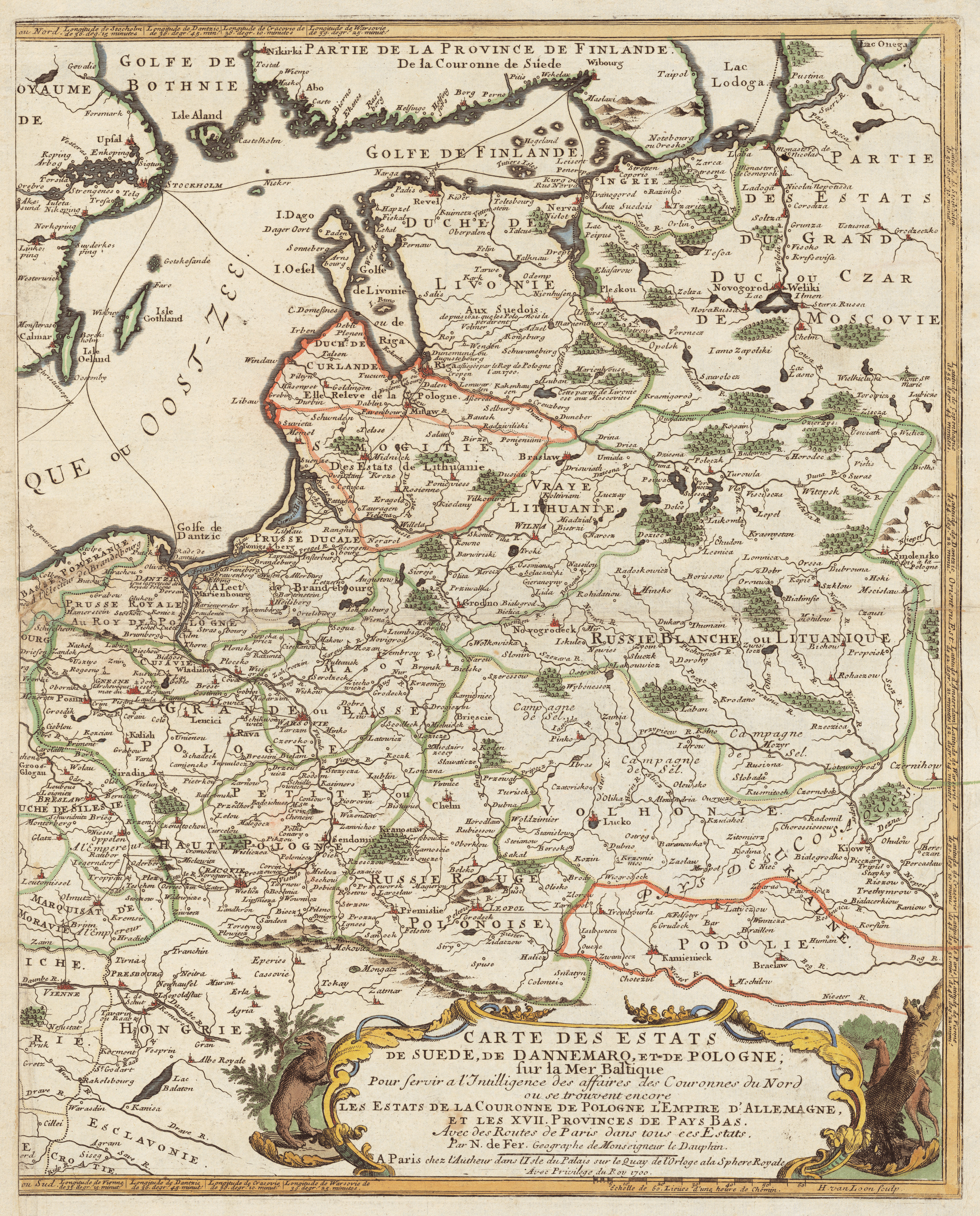
Map of the States of Sweden, Denmark, and Poland; on the Baltic Sea, 1700

== Career ==
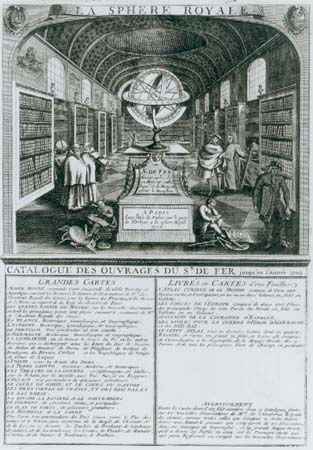
La Sphère Royale

De Fer was so successful at improving the firm that, in 1690, he became the official geographer to Louis, Dauphin of France. With support from the Spanish and French royal families, de Fer also became official geographer for Philip V and Louis XIV, the kings of Spain and France, respectively. Because of this, his maps became Bourbon propaganda, endorsing French King Louis XIV.

His business flourished, producing town plans, atlases, wall maps, and more than 600 sheet maps. He made maps of places in Europe and North America, including New Spain, places fortified by Vauban, the Low Countries, and the War of the Spanish Succession. In 1698, de Fer published a map of North America, which included a depiction of beavers building dams near Niagara Falls. Seventeen years later, Herman Moll published a map which plagiarized elements of de Fer's work, particularly the beaver scene. It became known as the "Beaver map". De Fer became the official geographer for The King of Spain in 1720. Two of his sons-in-law, Guillaume Danet and Jaques-François Bénard, continued the company after de Fer's death on 25 October of that year until around 1760.

== Major works ==
- Les Côtes de France (1690)
- La France triomphante sous le règne de Louis le Grand (1693)
- Atlas Royal (first ed. 1695)
- Petit et Nouveau Atlas (1697)
- Atlas curieux (1700)
- Atlas ou recueil de cartes géographiques dressées sur les nouvelles observations (1709)
- La Sphère Royale (1717)

== See also ==
- List of French engravers
