= Johannot =

Johannot (English: /ˌʒoʊˈɑːnoʊ/, French: [ʒɔano]) is a French surname. Notable people with the surname include:

- Alfred Johannot (1800–1837), French painter and engraver
- Tony Johannot (1803–1852), French engraver, illustrator and painter
