= Le Musée français =

French book of engravings

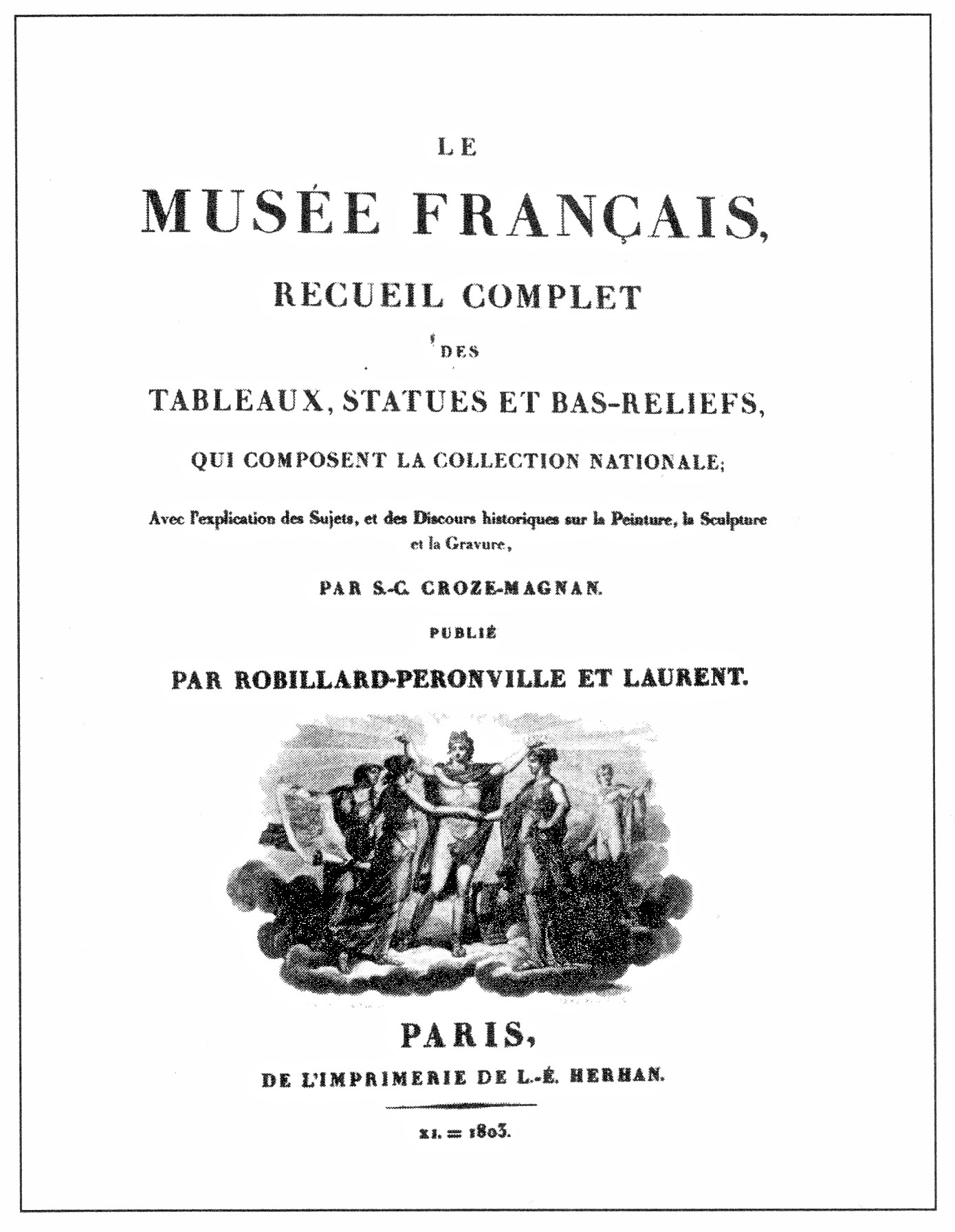
Le Musée français, title page, 1803. Vignette by Raphael Urbain Massard, from a drawing by J.M. Moreau le jeune.

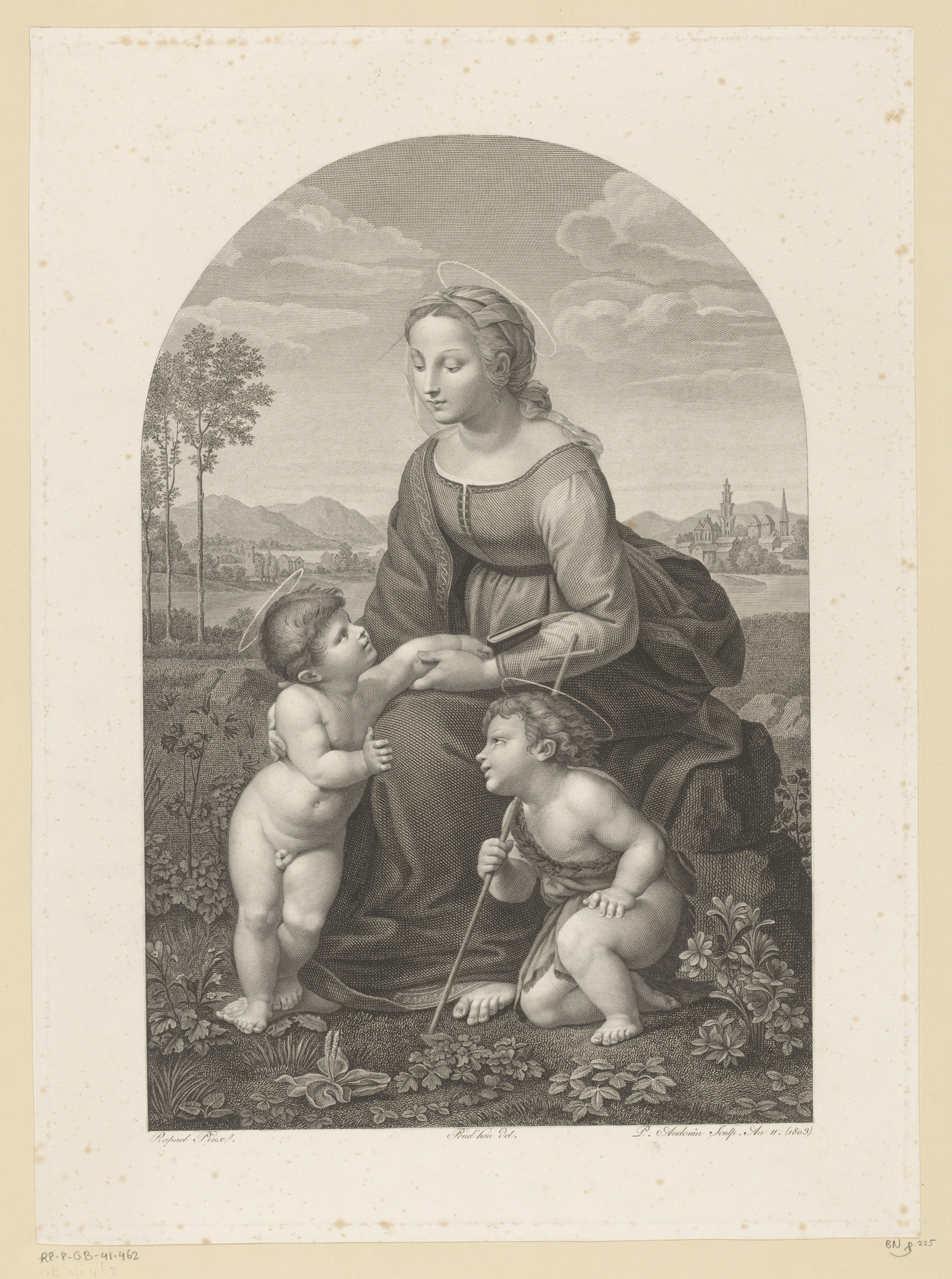
"La Belle Jardinière" by Raphael. Engraving by Pierre Audouin after a drawing by Pierre-Paul Prud'hon (image 34.4 x 23.3 cm) of the painting in the Louvre Museum; published in 1803 in the first fascicle of Le Musée français.

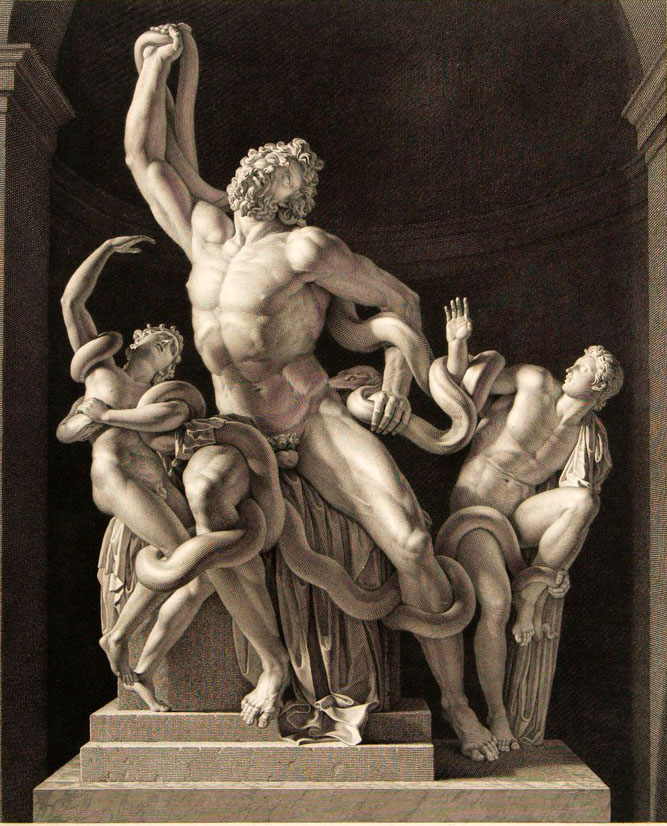
"Le Laocoon," Roman sculpture. Engraved by Charles Clément Bervic, from a drawing by Pierre Bouillon (image 34 x 27.7 cm); published in the final fascicle of the first series of Le Musée français, 1812.

Le Musée français is a French publication of engravings issued in fascicles in Paris between 1803 and 1824. It had three successive titles, Le Musée français, Le Musée Napoléon and Le Musée royal, and consists of a total of 504 large-format engravings of paintings and classical sculptures in the museum at the Louvre during this era. Printed on large in-folio sheets and issued with commentary texts and prefatory essays in letterpress, it is usually bound in six volumes and is treated as two separate publications in library cataloging and enumerative bibliography: e.g., the library catalogue of The Royal Academy of Arts (London) -- Le Musée français (4 vols.) and Le Musée royal (2 vols.). The issue of individual livraisons (fascicles) is recorded in the legal deposit for prints in Paris (le dépot légal de l’estampe) up to 1812

The project was initiated and directed by the engraver Pierre-François Laurent with assistance and financial backing of his in-law Louis-Nicolas-Joseph Robillard de Péronville until 1809, when the two of them died and the direction passed to Laurent's son Henri, who was also an engraver. Benefitting from a governmental loan signed personally by Bonaparte, a new subscription with a second series of plates was started in 1812 under the new title, Le Musée Napoléon. Its issue was suspended at the collapse of the First French Empire; and when it resumed in 1817, this title was replaced by a third one, reflecting the new name of the museum, Le Musée royal. It continued to be directed by Henri Laurent, who received the official appointment "graveur du Cabinet du Roi" from the new King Louis XVIII.

The first series, issued in 80 fascicles between 1803 and 1812 under the title Le Musée français, contains 343 unnumbered plates and their commentaries, along with 4 prefatory essays. The second series, usually referenced by the title it received in 1817, contains 161 unnumbered plates, their commentaries and two essays and was issued in 40 fascicles between 1812 and 1824. The plates were often exhibited by their engravers as individual art works at the Salons du Louvre, but they were not distributed separately apart from the subscriptions. They show a diversity of styles of engraving, employing burin with and without the assistance of etching and stipple, as was practiced at this period in order to represent narrative painting, portraiture and landscape—and also classical sculpture—prior to the invention of photography.

The commentary texts and essays were written by Simon-Célestin Croze-Magnan (until 1806), Toussaint-Bernard Émeric-David (between 1806-1812), Ennio Quirino Visconti (1806 until his death in 1818), François Guizot (between 1812 and 1824) and Charles le comte de Clarac (after 1818).

== Reception by contemporaries ==
It was one of several publications devoted to illustration of the paintings and classical sculptures seized by revolutionary governments for permanent display in the newly established Museum at the Louvre. Le Musée français was specially esteemed for the large dimension of its engravings which offered a rare occasion for display of the pictorial richness of the engraver's art; each would have required months or sometimes years to complete. Over 150 engravers from across Europe were employed in their production, utlilizing preparatory drawings by over 60 draftsmen, including some of the finest hands of their generation. Its appearance was welcomed in the official newspaper, Le Moniteur, as an important artistic achievement in its own right, more worthy of public attention than any similar work since the origin of the art of engraving, itself. Soon afterwards the Museum Director, Vivant Denon, praised the Musée français as a “monument des arts” and ended the Museum's own official program to engrave the art works in its collections. In governmental reports, as well as in press reviews, its preparation was credited to have single-handedly revived the practice of burin engraving in France and become the source of "a great school" in its encouragement of the development of skills which were deemed important for the advancement of art and national commerce: the simulation of the qualities of highly regarded art works by means of print, in a manner suitable for the transmission of information, artistic inspiration and memorialisation.

In the bibliographic literature it was commonly described as “collection magnifique.” Brunet's repertory contains no work having a comparable quantity of large format, fully realized reproductive engravings; and according to the official juries of the Exposition de 1806 and the Exposition de 1819, the quality of execution was "perfect".

== Production ==
Undertaken as a commercial enterprise, the publication remained in private hands throughout its long history, despite its national prominence and considerable subsidation by the government. This “unofficial” status enabled its production during an era of violent political instability and warfare, and it facilitated the administration of hundreds of commissions of considerable expense to artists of various nationalities without the political scrutiny required of governmental patronage and awards.

Laurent initially proposed his project in 1790 in a request for authorization to engrave the collections of paintings, classical sculpture and drawings of Louis XVI, without expense to the royal treasury. His idea was modelled on the celebrated Recueil Crozat of seventy years earlier; but official policy now reserved this privilege for the retinue of the Royal Academy of Painting and Sculpture, which was in turmoil due to events of the French Revolution. Laurent, who was never associated with this institution, due to his activities in commerce, had the backing of the King's First Gentleman, Alexandre d'Aumont; and he claimed to have funding for the employment of thirty engravers and “a large number” draftsmen, along with a commercial network for international distribution. A year later in August of 1791—two years before the opening of the Museum itself—he obtained permission to proceed and within 4 months was able to show preparatory drawings to the King; a handful of contracts for engravings are known from this and the following year, and one of the engravings was publicly exhibited at the Salon of 1793.

Despite political contention, his authorization was renewed by the regimes of the Convention, the Directorate and the Consulat; and it was defended legislatively by no less a voice than Sebastien Mercier against the proposal of a state monopoly for the engraving of the Museum's collections. At the time of his alliance with Robillard-Peronville in 1802, Laurent was able to contribute an undertaking of engravings and preparatory drawings valued at 50,000 francs; but this considerable investment was only 20% of what would eventually be needed to produce the 343 engravings of the first series of Le Musée français, without accounting for the additional expense of paper, printing, letterpress, etc.

Long before its completion, the publication's second series was established as a legally independent entity in an agreement of 1807 with the investor and banker François Parguez. The plates of the earliest appearing fascicles of the second series would have already been complete, or nearly complete, by the date of Bonaparte's decree of a massive loan in support its publication in April 1812. Equally munificent was the act of Louis XVIII in 1816 to dissolve this obligation to the advantage of Laurent and company, allowing the subscription to resume until finished in 2 volumes in 1824. According to a note addressed to Henri Laurent and published in the Moniteur, it was the new King's pleasure to restore the cultural prestige of his dynasty by encouraging endeavors such as this, which had been begun under the reign of his brother Louis XVI; this message was communicated by the King's First Gentleman, who was in fact the son of one of the publication's earliest patrons in 1790.

The King's munificence is all the more remarkable because many of the engravings awaiting publication in 1816 depicted art works which were no longer a part of the Museum but had been returned to their former owners following the collapse of the First Empire. While the publication therefore recalled to contemporaries artistic masterpieces now lost to France, its engravings remained a subject of deep appreciation, art works of which the fidelity of their rendering was now admired for its own sake as “an invention” of art.

== The Plates' Re-editions ==
After completion of the two subscriptions, the engraving plates were subject to reprinting and sale, integrally as complete sets and individually as separately published engravings, on many occasions. In fact, there is evidence that their marketable appeal for the depiction of celebrated paintings and sculptures survived well past the historical development of photography for this purpose, which suggests that these images would have contributed significantly to the reputation and study of these specific paintings and sculptures throughout the nineteenth century and to the Art Historical canon of subsequent eras. However, without a generally accepted, systematized record of the engravings, the identification of their impressions is not simple: the plates lack syndetic indications such as numbering, and have no labelling, apart from the titles of their subjects and their artists’ names.

All of the 161 engraved plates of the second series, the Musée royal, were sold at auction in a single lot in March 1824, purchased by the Paris book publisher Jules Renouard. Copies of the first series had been advertised for sale in completed volumes since 1812 by the descendants of Robillard-Peronville, and the fonds of its plates was announced for sale in Le Moniteur in 1826 before being reprinted in a new edition in 1829, published by the English bookstore in Paris, A. and W. Galignani, with a new title page and a revised subtitle having reference to “the most beautiful paintings and sculptures” which “existaient au Louvre avant 1815” (i.e., which existed at the Louvre before 1815). An American art publisher, Shearjashub Spooner, claimed to have purchased all of the plates of both series in London in 1846, with the intent of a North American re-edition, but the edition did not occur. The two united series were also offered for sale to the Chalcographie of the Louvre Museum in 1853 and again in 1854 through the agency of the Parisian printer, Sauvé. Ten years later, July 4, 1865, the printer Charles Chardon l’aîné filed in legal deposit, as was legally required, separately published new editions of Bervic’s engraving of “Laocoon”, Giraudet’s “Centaur,” J.J. Avril fils’ “Euterpe” after a drawing by Granger, Laugier’s “Le Tibre,” also after Granger, and Laugier’s “Vénus accroupie du Vatican”—all classical sculptures; their editions were due to be released in Paris by the dealer Danlos l’aîné; in the following five years up to 1870, similar listings in La BIbliographie de la France announced publication of hundreds of re-editions of additional prints of the Musée français without a single reference to this title or to the plates' origin in any larger, inclusive publication. However, a final collective edition is recorded ten years later, printed in Paris by Félix Hermet with the title: Musée (le) du Louvre. Collection de 500 planches gravées au burin par les sommités contemporaines, d'après les grands maîtres en peinture et en sculpture des diverses écoles (i.e., Collection of 500 plates engraved with burin by the most renowned contemporaries after the great masters of painting and sculpture of the various schools). More significant still of the esteem which these prints once inspired is a publication of 1863 which would consist of the “photographic reproduction” of a copy of the engravings of the Musée français, by Jeanne Laplanche undertaken because the original had become so highly valued and rare.
