= Alphonse Leroy (engraver) =

French engraver and photographer (1820-1902)

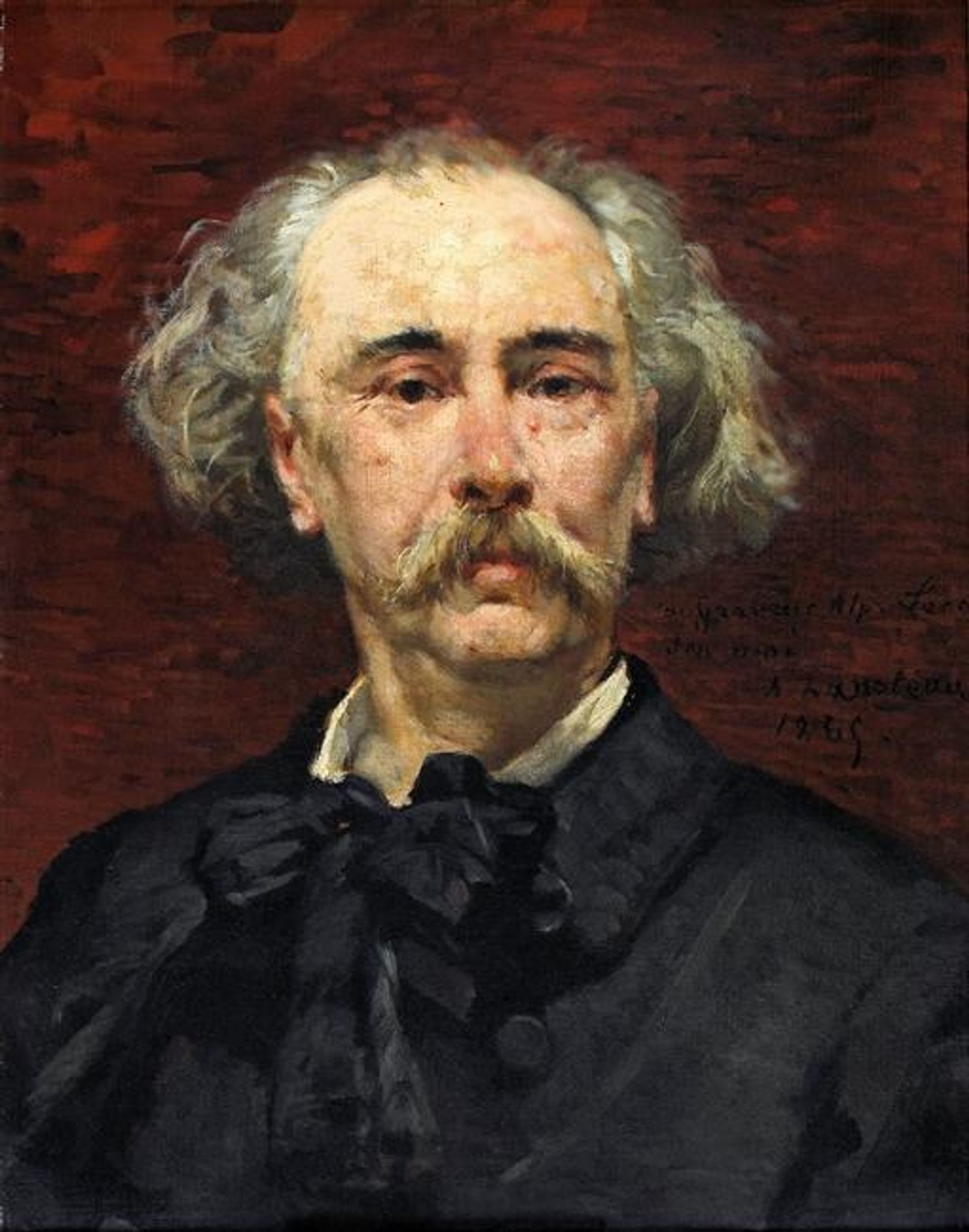
Portrait by Hector Hanoteau, 1885

Alphonse Leroy (4 June 1820 - 26 June 1902) was a French engraver and photographer.

== Life ==
He was born in Lille into a family that is known to have been active in the oil industry in the city since at least the 18th century. This technical background enabled him to add and adapt the possibilities available in the 19th century in both photography and engraving. He began his artistic career in 1844. He was trained by the engraver Charles Cousin in the latter's studio in the Louvre, where Leroy became a friend of Carolus-Duran, Camille Corot, Cabanel, the Goncourt brothers and Hector Hanoteau. He also befriended Paul Gachet, whom he taught engraving. He was noted, befriended and supported by Émilien de Nieuwerkerke, superintendent of the Academie des Beaux-arts. During the Paris Commune he took seven photographs of the barricades and the death of Monseigneur d'Arboy after drawings by Félix Philippoteaux.

In 1872 he and Gachet joined the Société des éclectiques, a society of aesthetes, engravers and poets which gathered around Achille Ricourt, Aglaüs Bouvenne and Eva Gonzalès and which aimed to help artists in financial difficulties. It organised a monthly dinner, often the subject of an engraving by one of its members. Leroy returned to Lille in 1888 and became professor of engraving in the academic schools. His pupils Georges Buisset, Louis Danel, Arthur Mayeur, Edmond Pennequin and Émile Théodore were all successful, as was Omer Désiré Bouchery, who still spoke affectionately of Leroy forty years after the later's death. His portrait was also painted by his friends and students François Bonvin, Omer Bouchery, Désiré-Auguste Ghesquière, Hector Hanoteau and Arthur Mayeur.

Leroy was also one of the founders of the Union artistique du Nord and president of the commission of Lille's musée Wicar (later known as the Palais des Beaux-Arts). Leroy excelled in all engraving techniques but particularly in the field of interpretative engraving. He produced three large folios of engravings after the masters, several illustrations and several photographs of artists such as Corot and Manet as well as gathering a large collection of drawings and engravings (including 65 copper-plate engravings now in the Louvre and 188 numbered engravings). He died in Lille and its Palais des beaux-arts has several of his drawings and engravings, though others are to be found elsewhere in France, the USA and Mexico (Biblioteca Panizzi, San Fernando, Santa Fe).
