= Marianne du 14 Juillet series =

Marianne du 14 Juillet stamp, mention RF

Marianne du 14 Juillet is a definitive stamp series issued in France between 14 July 1997 and 2005. She replaced the Marianne du Bicentenaire series and was replaced by Marianne des Français series. It was designed by Ève Luquet and engraved by Claude Jumelet.

== Description ==
The stamp represents Marianne, allegory of the French Republic, wearing as usual a tricolor cockade, and the Phrygian cap. She is looking to the left. The French motto is written on top of the stamp.

Finally chosen by President Jacques Chirac after a competition, the design was better received than the Marianne du Bicentenaire series, often judged as a dead face with its empty eyes.

== Postal history ==
The first stamps were issued 15 July 2005 nationwide, with a first day of issue on 14 July, National Day in France. They can be used in Metropolitan France, Guadeloupe, French Guiana, Martinique, Réunion, and overprinted for use in Mayotte and Saint-Pierre-et-Miquelon.

From 1997 to 2001, the stamps wore the mention "République française" as usual for French stamps. From 2001 to 2005, the stamps wore the mention "RF".

Two commemorative stamps were issued with this Marianne on the left side of the stamp :

- in 1997 to announce Philexfrance 99, an international philatelic exhibitions in Paris,
- in 2004 to promote the fight against AIDS, tuberculosis and malaria.
