= Marie Catherine Riollet =

French engraver

Marie Cathérine Riollet
- Born: 14 August 1755; Paris
- Died: 1788 (aged 32–33); Paris

Marie Cathérine Riollet (14 August 1755 – 1788) was a French engraver.

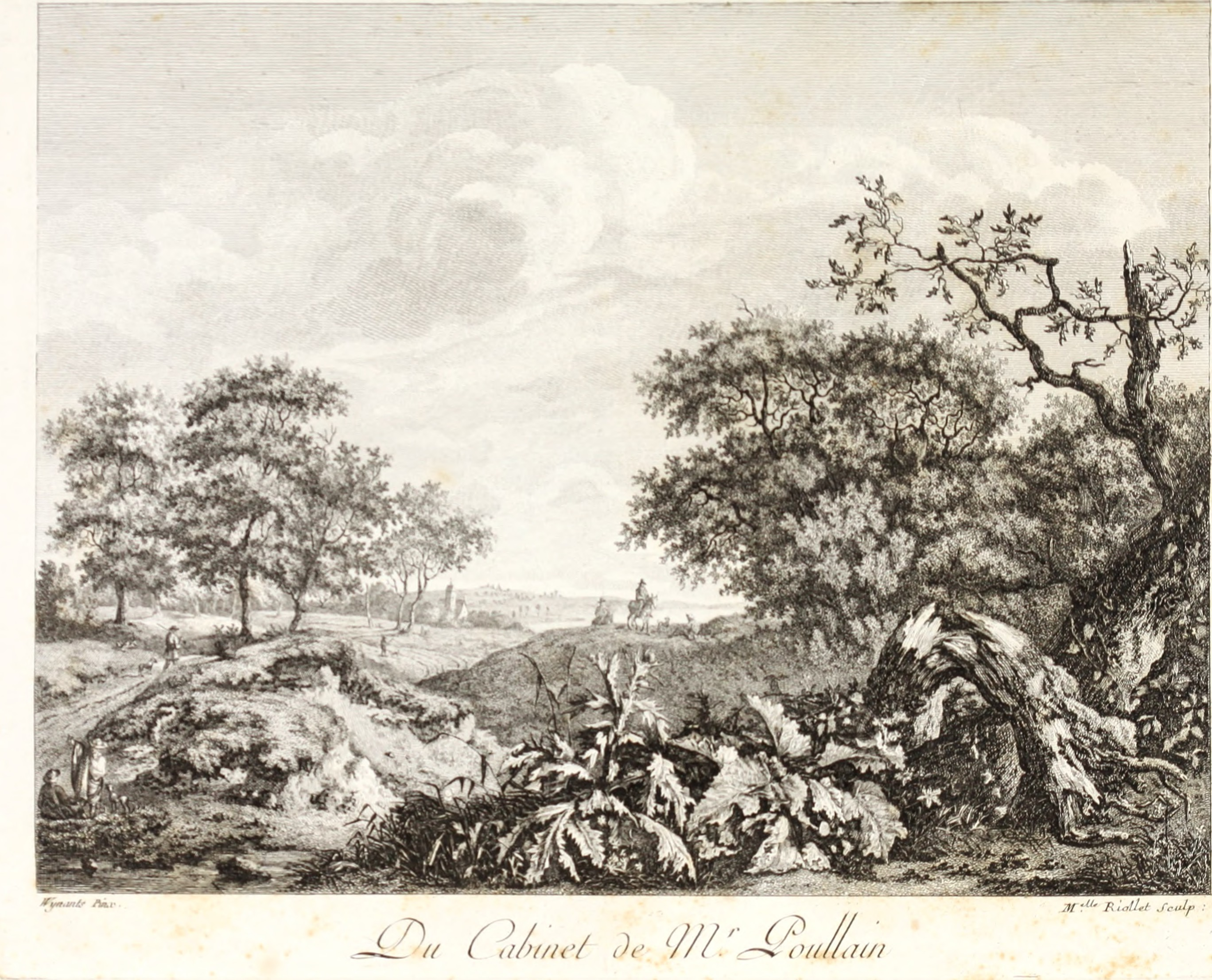
Landscape with Hunters after a painting by Jan Wijnants for the Cabinet de M. Poullain, c. 1780-1781

Riollet was born in Paris and is known for engravings after popular painters, mostly for catalogs. She married late and became the third wife of fellow engraver Jacques Firmin Beauvarlet, but died the next year. She signed her works Mlle Riollet.

Riollet died in Paris.
