= Pierre-François Laurent =

French engraver

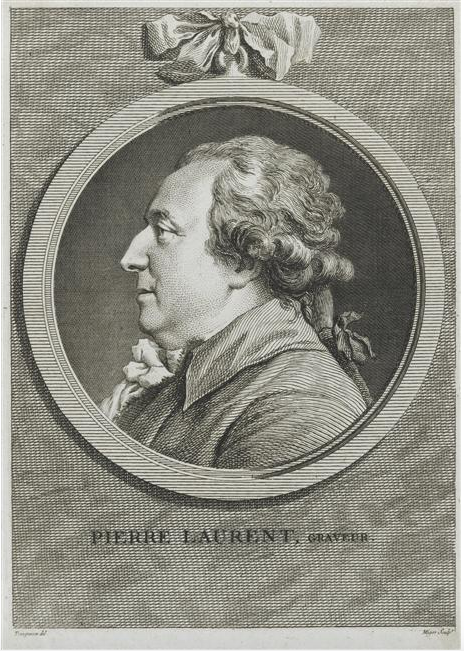
The engraver Pierre François Laurent, engraved by Simon-Charles Miger, from a drawing by Trinquesse.

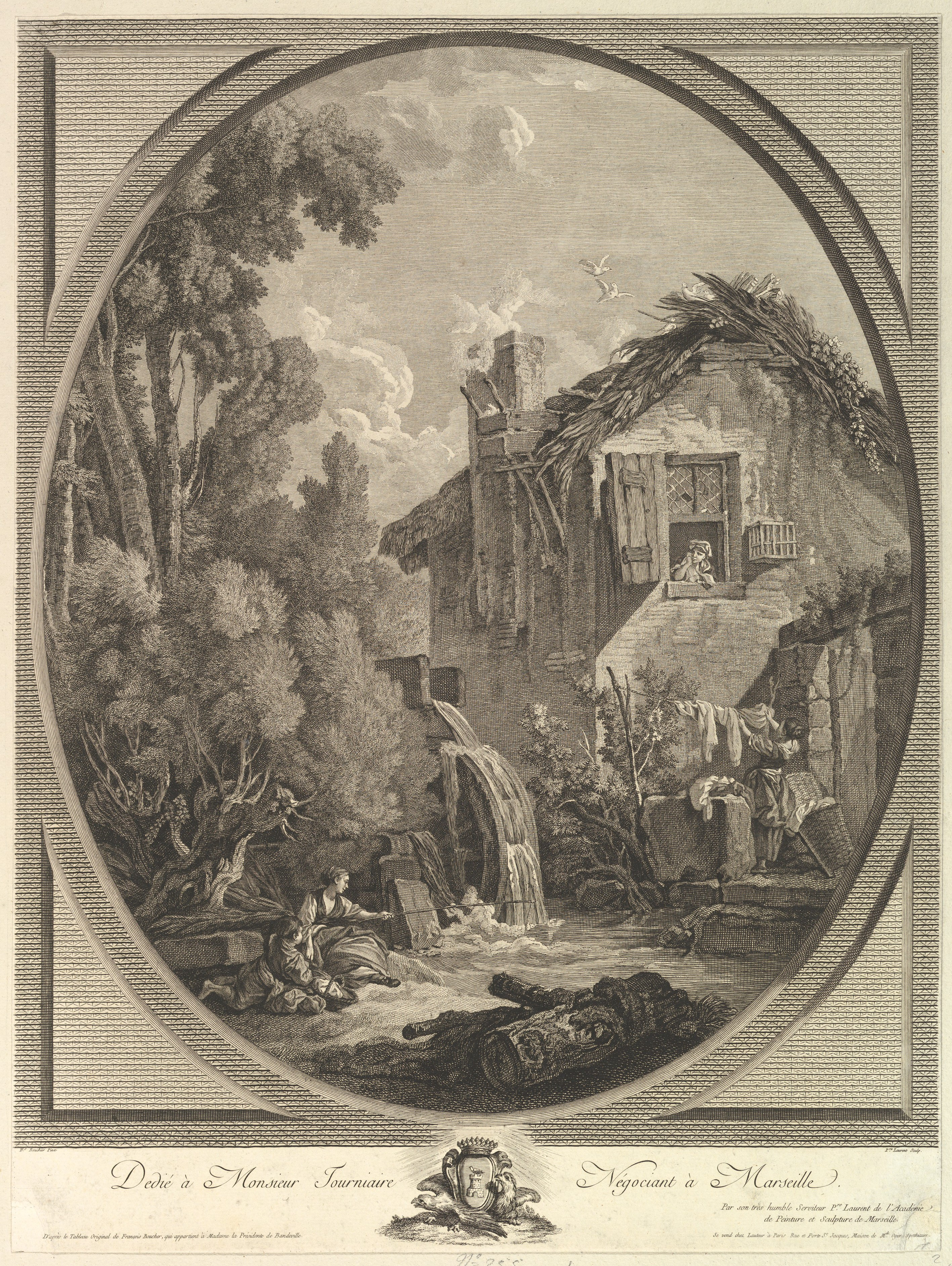
Untitled (Windmill Landscape). Engraved by Pierre Laurent after Boucher, 1776. The Metropolitain Museum of Art.

Pierre-François Laurent (1739-1809) was an engraver and co-director with Louis-Nicolas-Joseph Robillard de Péronville of the publication Le Musée français. As an engraver, he specialised in landscapes and genre subjects after Dutch artists. He also produced several engravings of subjects from the recent national history.

Born in Marseille, he received the award for drawing at the Académie des arts de Marseille in 1756. He studied engraving with Jean-Joseph Balechou in Avignon in 1757; and somewhat later he studied etching with Étienne Fessard, who held the position of Engraver of the King’s Library in Paris. Laurent’s ambition to publish engravings of the collection of paintings and drawings of the King evidently dates from this experience, for it was a specific charge of Fessard’s appointment. Laurent’s earliest publications in Paris—engravings after Greuze and Nicholas Berghem—were announced in the Mercure de France in 1773; they were published by Fessard’s distributor Buldet, and Laurent signed them as an affiliate (“de”) of the academy in Marseille.

His early career was known to Pierre Jean Mariette, who expressed "great hope" in his future ("des grandes espérances"), while noting that he had been active in print commerce in Marseille. It was also reported that he spent several years working in the print trade with the firm of Daudet et Joubert in Lyon, before coming to Paris. His commercial activity as an art dealer is evident from his filing with the city of Paris for relief from debt in 1783—among his losses was 6000 livres of framed prints which he had shipped to Philadelphia.

Larent’s commercial engagements would have estranged him from the Académie royale de peinture et de sculpture in Paris, where commerce in art works was forbidden. He never exhibited with this body, and there is no evidence that he even applied for its membership. Nonetheless, he obtained positions in the royal household, named graveur de Roi (engraver of the King) in 1777 for his collaboration on the “Monument to the Glory of Louis XVI” published by the abbé de Lubersac. In 1780, having personally presented to the King his engraving “La Mort du Chevalier d’Assas” after Casanova, he was named Graveur du Département de la Guerre (Engraver of the War Department).

Recognition at Court helps to account for his initiative, without the privilege of association with the Royal Academy, to propose with the support of the King’s First Gentleman (le premier gentilhomme du Roi), Alexandre d’Aumont, the engraving of the paintings and drawings of the Royal Collection in August of 1790. The proposal was initially refused; but it was the origin of what was to become the publication Le Musée français, consisting of 504 large format engravings of paintings in the national museum at the Louvre—the employment of over 150 engravers from across Europe.

In disposition, Pierre Laurent was said to be perfectly suited to this task: affable, very supportive of the artists in his employment, persevering, knowledgeable and an enthusiast of the practice of his art. He was twice married: first, to Marie Thérèse Barral in 1764 in Marseilles—of whom two children, Charles and Anne, who married the engraver Pierre Audouin—and following the death of his first wife in 1776, to Henriette Thérèse Ogier In 1778 in Paris, a marriage without sharing of property (“aucune communauté de biens”) – of whom a single son in 1779, Pierre-Louis-Henri, known as Henri; she was probably related to the celebrated J.F. Ogier, president of the national Senate, whose recent decease Laurent had observed with the engraving of the design of a funeral monument. Laurent is also said to have been related through the Barras family of Marseille to the wife of his eventual collaborator and financier Robillard de Peronville, a connection which is corroborated by the dedication of an engraving in 1773 to “Monsieur de Barras la Villette ... par son serviteur et cousin P. Laurent.”

His son, Henri Laurent, (1779-1844), also an engraver, contributed to the execution of the Le Musée français and, after his father’s death, directed its completion under the title Le Musée royal in 1824. According to Basan, Pierre Laurent was also assisted by a brother, Louis Laurent, who was proficient at etching. He—not Pierre—may have been responsible for works listed under the name "M. Laurent" at the Salon of 1791; Louis Laurent was listed as an engraver and a print publisher in Paris at the address of his nephew Henri during the 1820’s.

Engravings by Pierre François Laurent can be found in The British Museum, The V&A, The Metropolitan Museum of Art New York and the Département des Estampes et des Photographies of the Bibliothèque nationale de France.

== Works ==
- Des boeufs prèsd'une chaumière, after Potter, 1805 (in Le Musée français).
- Les Ruines du Colisée, after Nicolaes Berchem, 1806 (in Le Musée français).
- Untitled (Landscape with Bridge and Dovecote), after Boucher, 1776.
- Vue de Flandre, after Jan van Goyen, 1805 (in Le Musée français).
- Woman and her boy on horseback after Jean-Baptiste-Henri Deshays.
- La Mort du Chevalier d'Assas, after Casanova, 1777.
- Le Jeune Désilles à l’affaire de Nancy le 31 août 1790, after Le Barbier.
- Le Deluge, after N. Poussin, 1802.
