= Charles Clément Bervic =

French engraver (1756–1822)

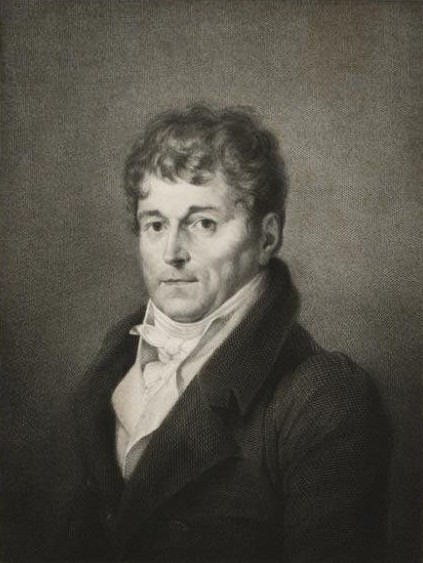
Portrait of Charles Clement Bervic, engraved by his pupil Paolo Toschi

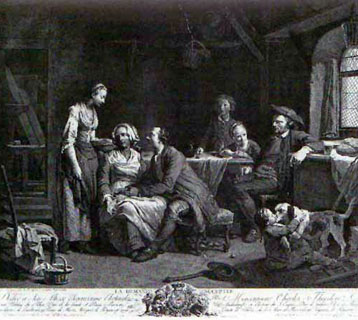
La demande acceptée

Charles Clément Bervic (23 May 1756, Paris – 23 March 1822, Paris), born Balvay, was a French engraver mainly working in intaglio and exclusively in burin. Due to an error in transcribing the baptismal register, he is also now known as Jean Guillaume Bervic.

He served his first apprenticeship under Jean-Baptiste Le Prince, then left aged 14 for the studio of the engraver Jean-Georges Wille. When he was 18, he won first prize for drawing at the Académie royale de peinture et de sculpture, of which he was elected a member in 1784. He became a member of the Classe de Beaux-Arts (Fine Arts Section) of the Institut Impérial de France in 1803 and authored the chapter on engraving for the Institut's reports to the Emperor in 1808 on the progress of the arts, literature and sciences since 1789. He won many prizes and his drawing talents were particularly appreciated.

In 1809, Bervic was elected an associate member, fourth class, of the Royal Institute of the Netherlands, predecessor to the Royal Netherlands Academy of Arts and Sciences.

Bervic married the painter Marie-Marguerite Carreaux de Rosemond in 1788, but she died later that year. In 1791 he remarried to Marie-Madeleine Bligny, who died in 1795.

== Works ==
- Gabriel Senac de Meilhan (1783) after Joseph Siffred Duplessis
- Louis XVI (1790) after Antoine-François Callet
- Saint John in the desert after Raphael
- The Education of Achilles after Jean-Baptiste Regnault
- The Declaration after Louis Rolland Trinquesse
- The Oath after Louis Rolland Trinquesse
- Le Laocoon, after the classical sculpture, from a drawing by Pierre Bouillion, issued in Le Musée français, 1812.
