= Pierre Bouillon =

French painter and engraver (1776–1831)

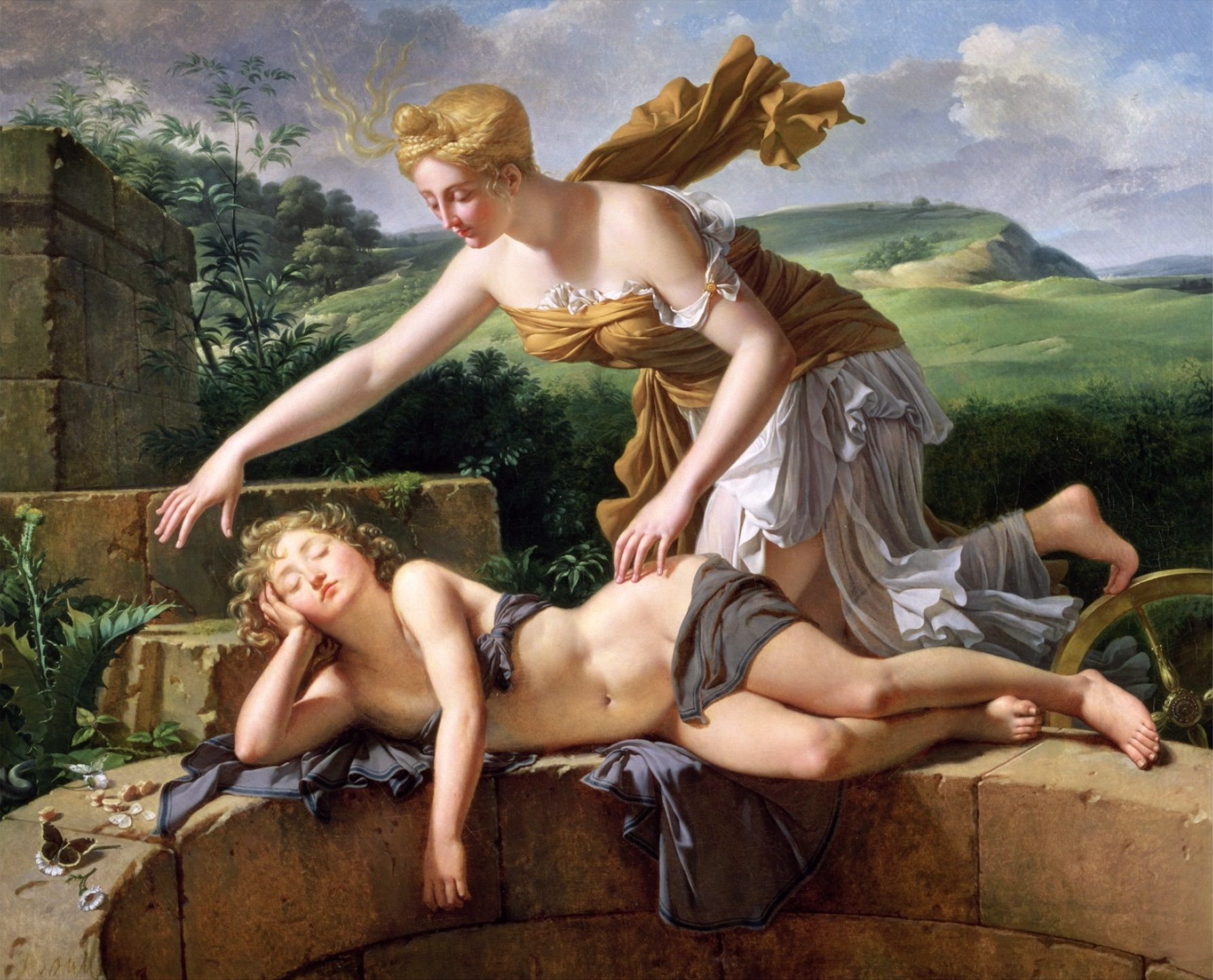
- "L'Enfant et la Fortune" by Bouillon, 1801
- Born: 1776; Thiviers, France
- Died: 15 October 1831 (aged 54–55); Paris, France
- Education: École nationale supérieure des Beaux-Arts
- Style: Painter and engraver
- Awards: Prix de Rome

Pierre Bouillon (1776 – 15 October 1831) was a French painter and engraver. Born in Thiviers, he studied with the Académie-trained history painter Nicolas-André Monsiau. He was awarded the grand prize of the Institut de France in July 1797 for his painting The Death of Cato of Utica. He exhibited in the Salon in 1796, 1799, 1801, 1804, 1819, 1822, and 1824.

As drawing instructor at the Lycée Louis Le Grand in Paris, he was a teacher of Théodore Géricault and perhaps also Eugène Delacroix. He was employed extensively to make preparatory drawings for the engravings of Pierre Laurent's publication, Le Musée français; his drawing for Charles Clément Bervic's celebrated engraving of the sculpture of Laocoön is among the 27 examples attributed to him in this work. Pierre Bouillon was also responsible for a publication devoted exclusively to the classical sculpture of the Louvre Museum, consisting of plates which he drew and etched himself, Le Musée des antiques ..., issued in 3 large folio volumes, 1811–1827.

== Gallery ==
Selected works by Pierre Bouillon
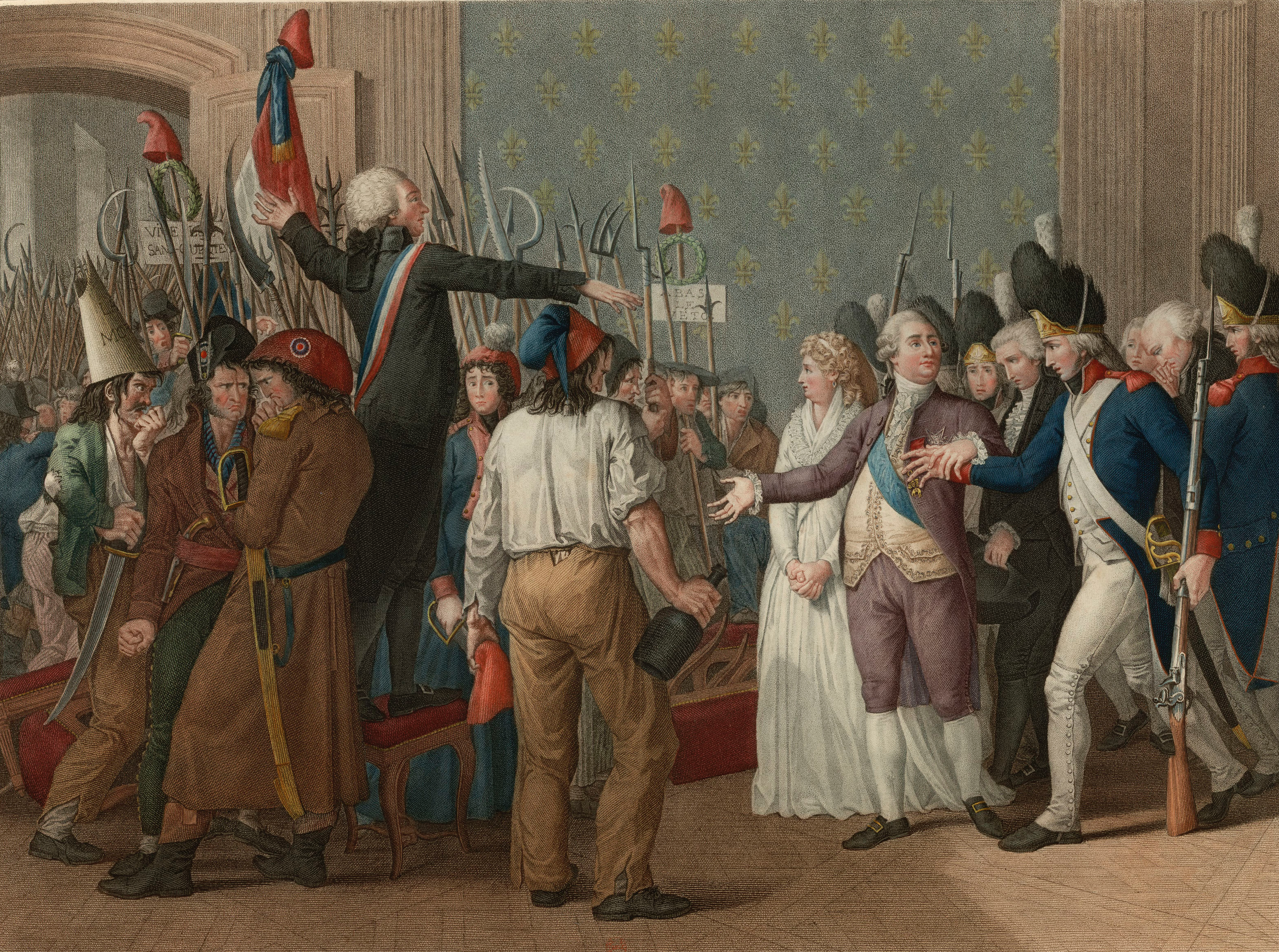
Journée du 20 juin 1792, 1796

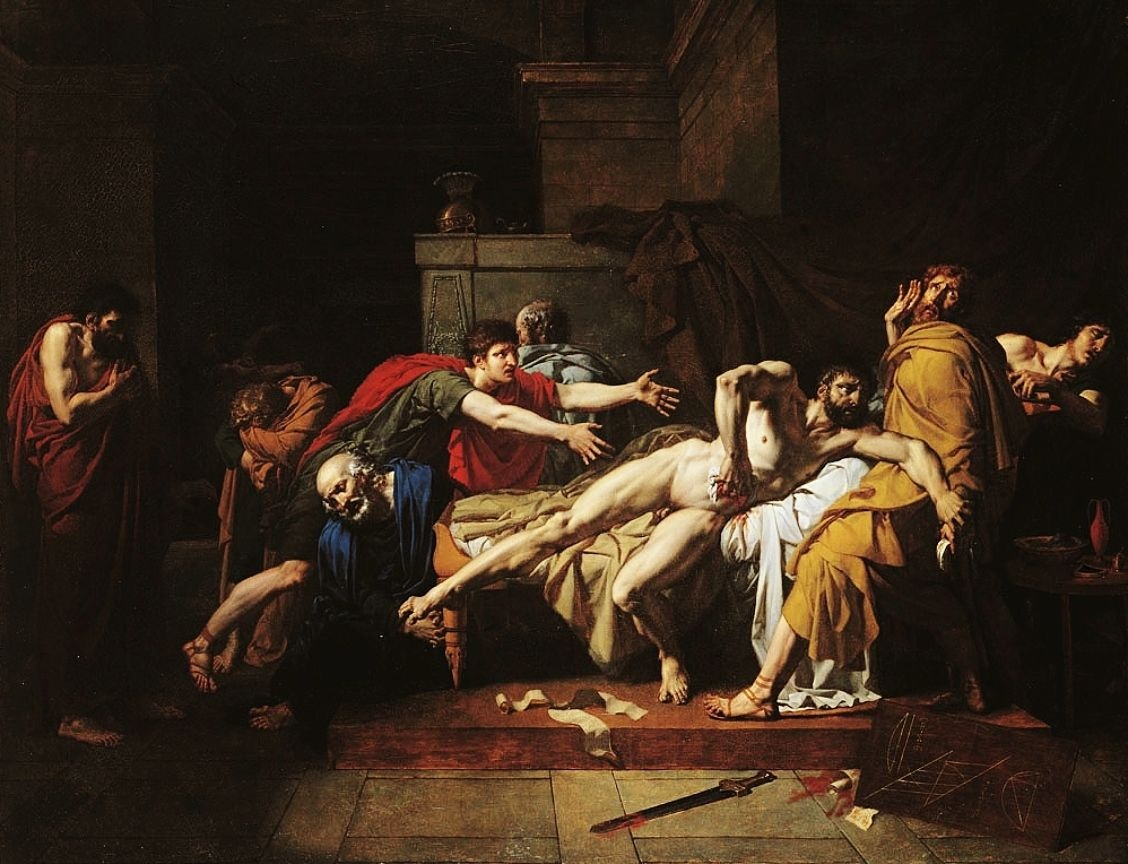
The Death of Cato of Utica, 1797

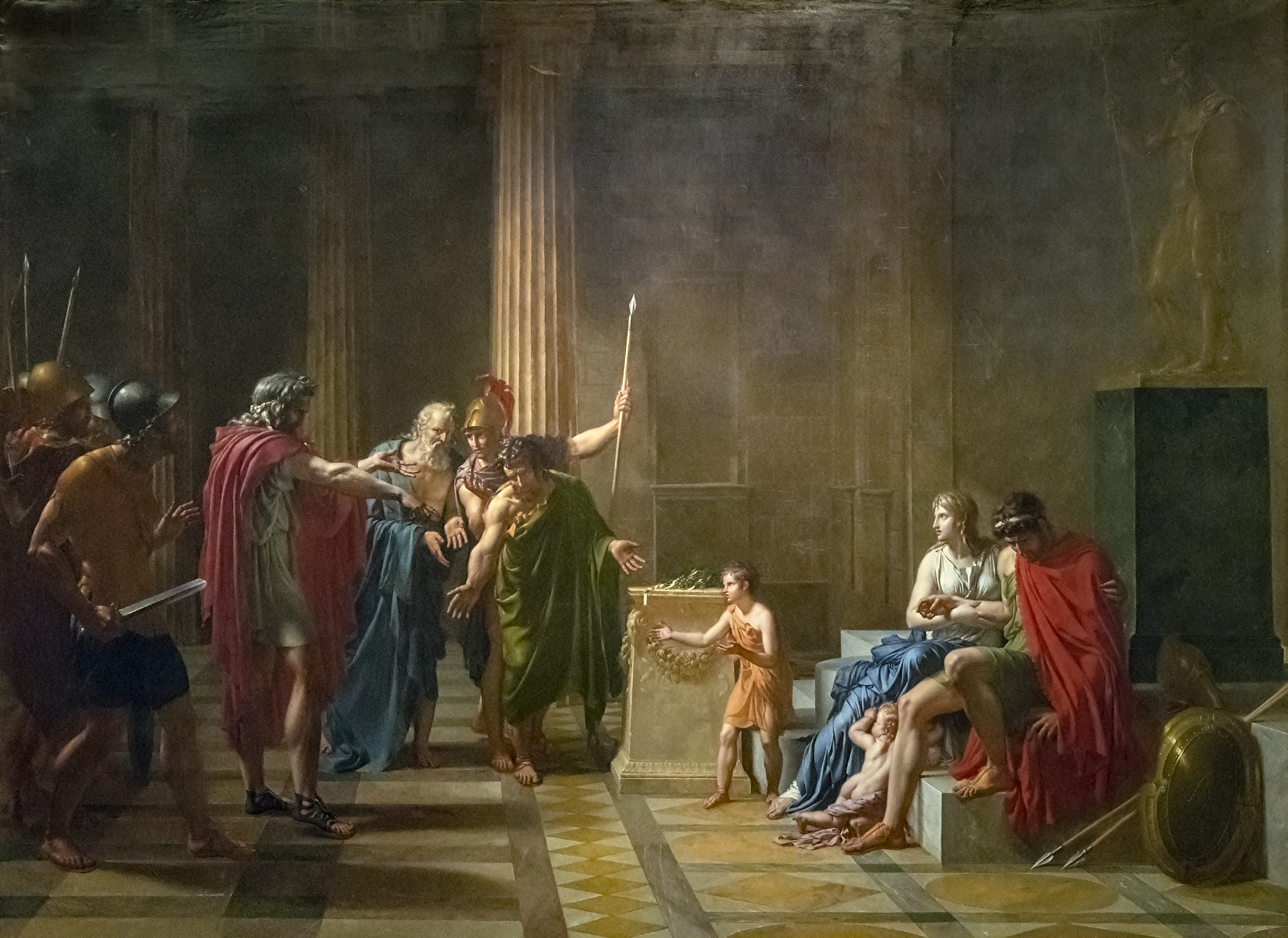
Leonidas, in consideration of his daughter Cleonide, is content to banish his son-in-law Cleombiote, Musée des Beaux-Arts de Carcassonne

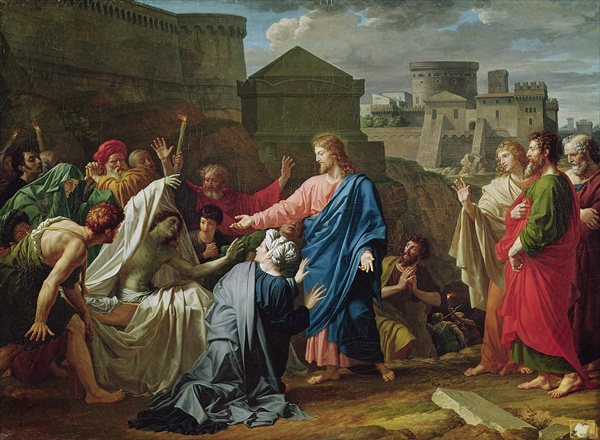
Jesus Resurrecting the Son of the Widow of Naim, c. 1817

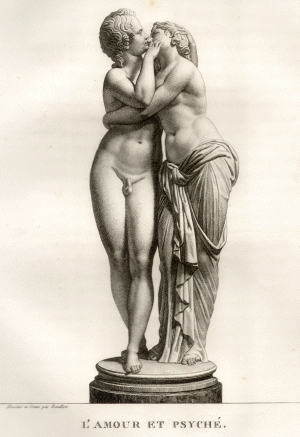
Amor and Psyche, between 1810 and 1821

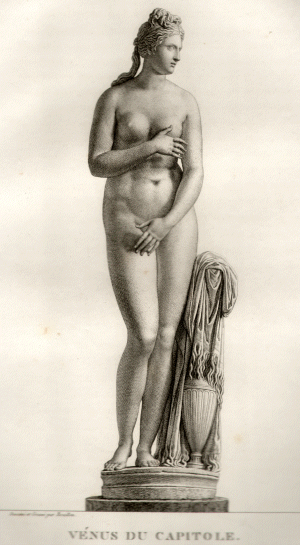
Vénus du Capitole, between 1810 and 1821

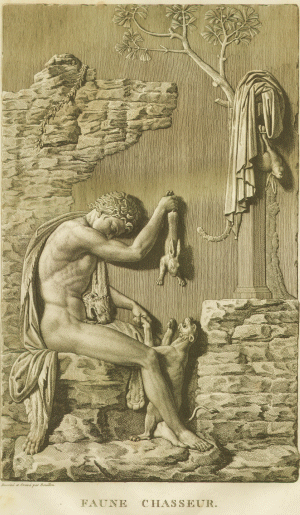
Faune chasseur, between 1810 and 1821
