= Omer Bouchery =

French illustrator

Omer Bouchery (1882–1962) was a French illustrator, who worked in the mediums of oil painting, engraving, and watercolours.
