= Simon-Célestin Croze-Magnan =

French librarian and writer (1750–1818)

Simon-Célestin Croze-Magnan (11 April 1750, Marseille - 11 August 1818, Marseille) was a French librarian and writer.

== Bibliography ==
- Notice nécrologique sur M. Croze-Magnan » in Jean-Baptiste Lautard, Histoire de l'Académie de Marseille depuis sa foundation en 1726 jusqu'en 1826, vol. III, Marseille, Achard, 1843, 411 p. (read online), p. 331-342
- Joseph Fournier, Auguste Rampal et Étienne Martin, Deux siècles d'histoire académique (1726–1926) : Notice publiée à l'occasion du bi-centenaire de l'Académie, Marseille, Académie des sciences, lettres et beaux-arts de Marseille, 1926, 215 p., p. 135-136.
