= Hector Hanoteau =

French painter

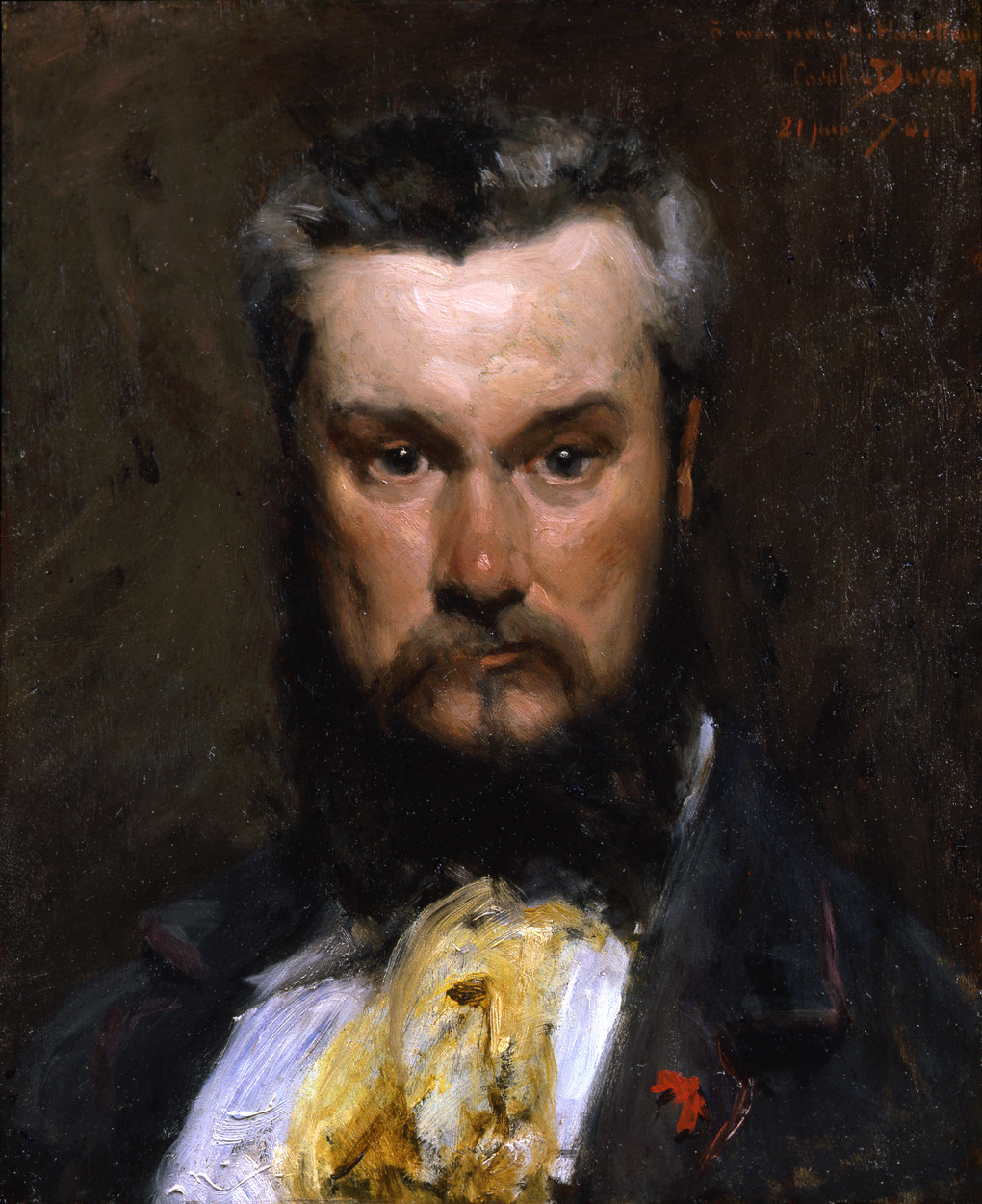
Portrait of Hector Hanoteau by Carolus-Duran, 1870

Hector Charles Auguste Octave Constance Hanoteau (25 May 1823 – 7 April 1890) was a French landscape painter born at Decize in Nièvre. At the École des Beaux-Arts, he was a pupil of Gignoux, and devoted himself chiefly to landscapes, characterized by sturdy realism and skillful color. He famous works are The Village Pond, The Frogs, and The Water Lilies, all of which are in the Musée d'Orsay. He is represented also in several French provisional museums. He received a first-class medal at the Paris Exposition of 1889 and the cross of the Légion d'honneur in 1870.
