= Aglaüs Bouvenne =

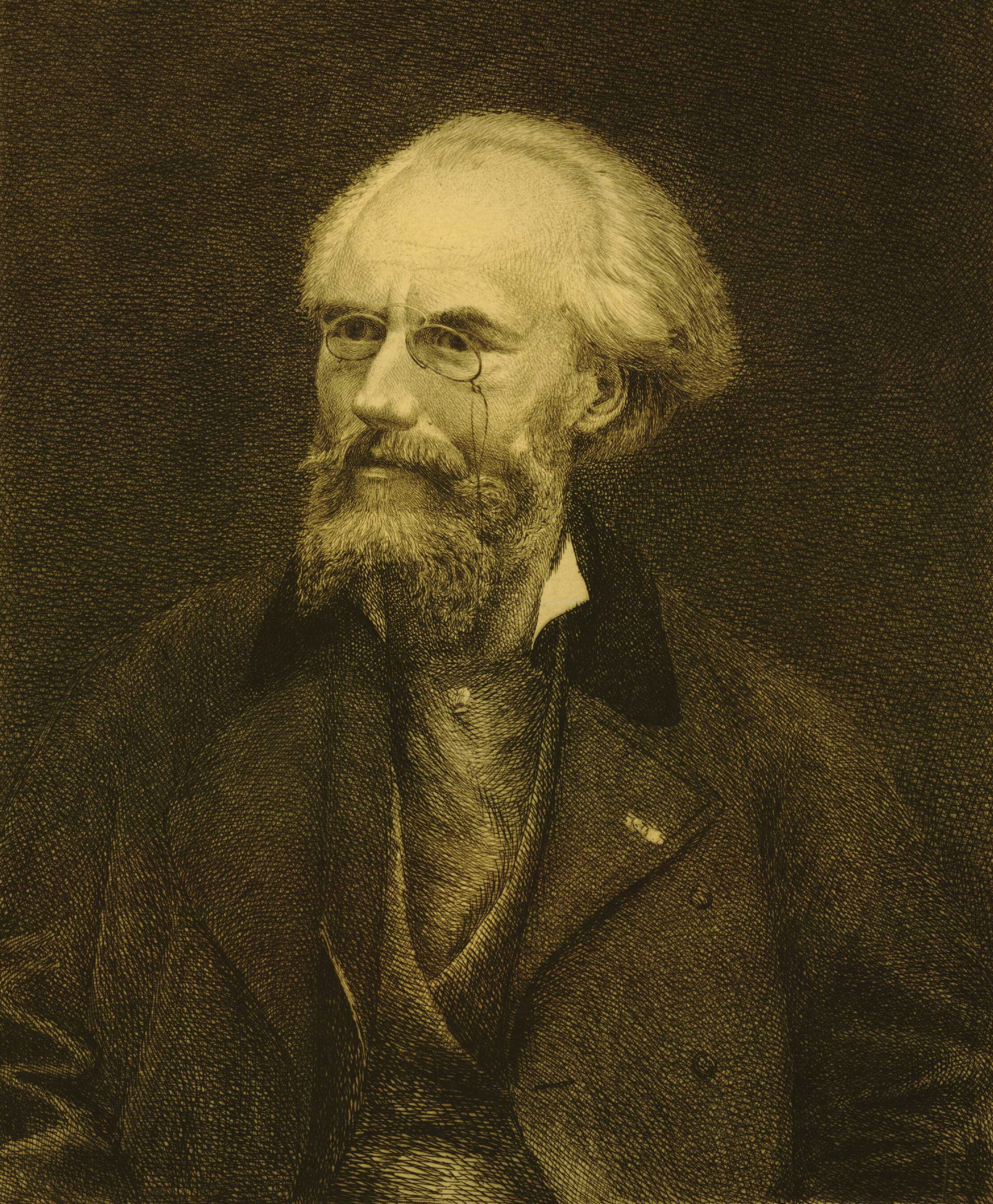
Autoportrait d'Aglaüs Bouvenne.

Aglaüs Ernest Bouvenne (6 February 1829 - 1903) was a French draughtsman and engraver.

He was born in Paris His works include a bookplate for Victor Hugo.

== Biography ==
Among other works, he engraved Victor Hugo bookplate.

First widowed of Adolphine Augustine Decamps, he remarried Elisabeth Flameng, sister of the engraver Léopold Flameng.

His collection included five Etching by Marie Bracquemond, two of which were engraved by Léon Coutil after his drawings.
