= Mieris =

Mieris is the name of a family of artists who practised painting at Leiden for three generations in the 17th and 18th centuries.

- Frans van Mieris the Elder (1635–1681)
- Jan van Mieris (1660–1690), son of Frans
- Willem van Mieris (1662–1747), son of Frans
- Frans van Mieris the Younger (1689–1763), son of Willem
