= Ève Luquet =

- Born: 6 September 1954 (age 71); Paris, France
- Education: École nationale supérieure des Beaux-Arts, Paris
- Known for: Stamp designer and engraver
- Notable work: Marianne du 14 Juillet series
- Awards: French Grand Prix de l'art philatélique (1995)

Ève Luquet (born 6 September 1954 in Paris) is a stamp designer and engraver. She had been designing stamps for the Andorran French post and France since 1986.

Luquet graduated in 1981 from the École nationale supérieure des Beaux-Arts of Paris, where she learned the art of engraving with stamp engraver Jacques Jubert. She engraves mainly landscapes and monuments.

In 1995, Luquet was awarded the French Grand Prix de l'art philatélique for a stamp representing the bridge of Nyons. The issue of Marianne du 14 Juillet series on 15 July 1997 was the first definitive stamp series for France to be created by a woman.
