= Louis Rolland Trinquesse =

French painter

Louis Rolland Trinquesse (c.1746 – 1800) was a French painter.

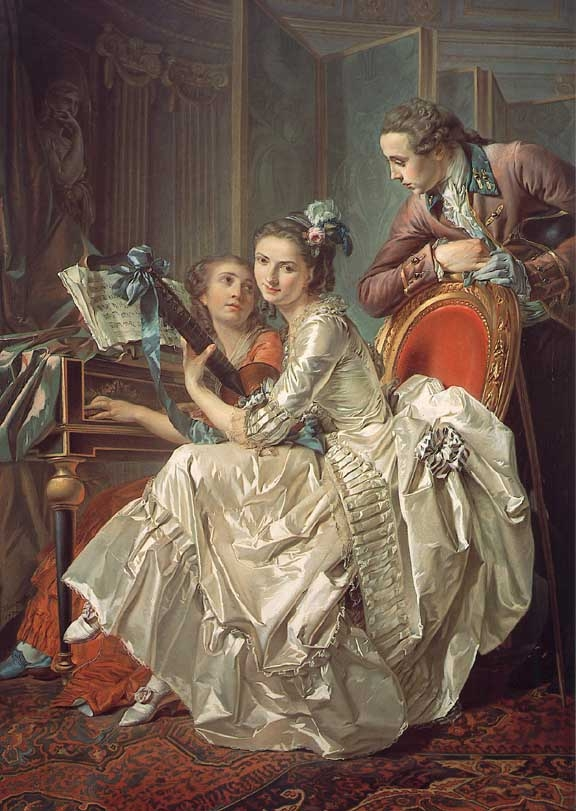
The Music Party, 1774, Oil on canvas, 194 × 133 cm. Alte Pinakothek, Munich, Germany

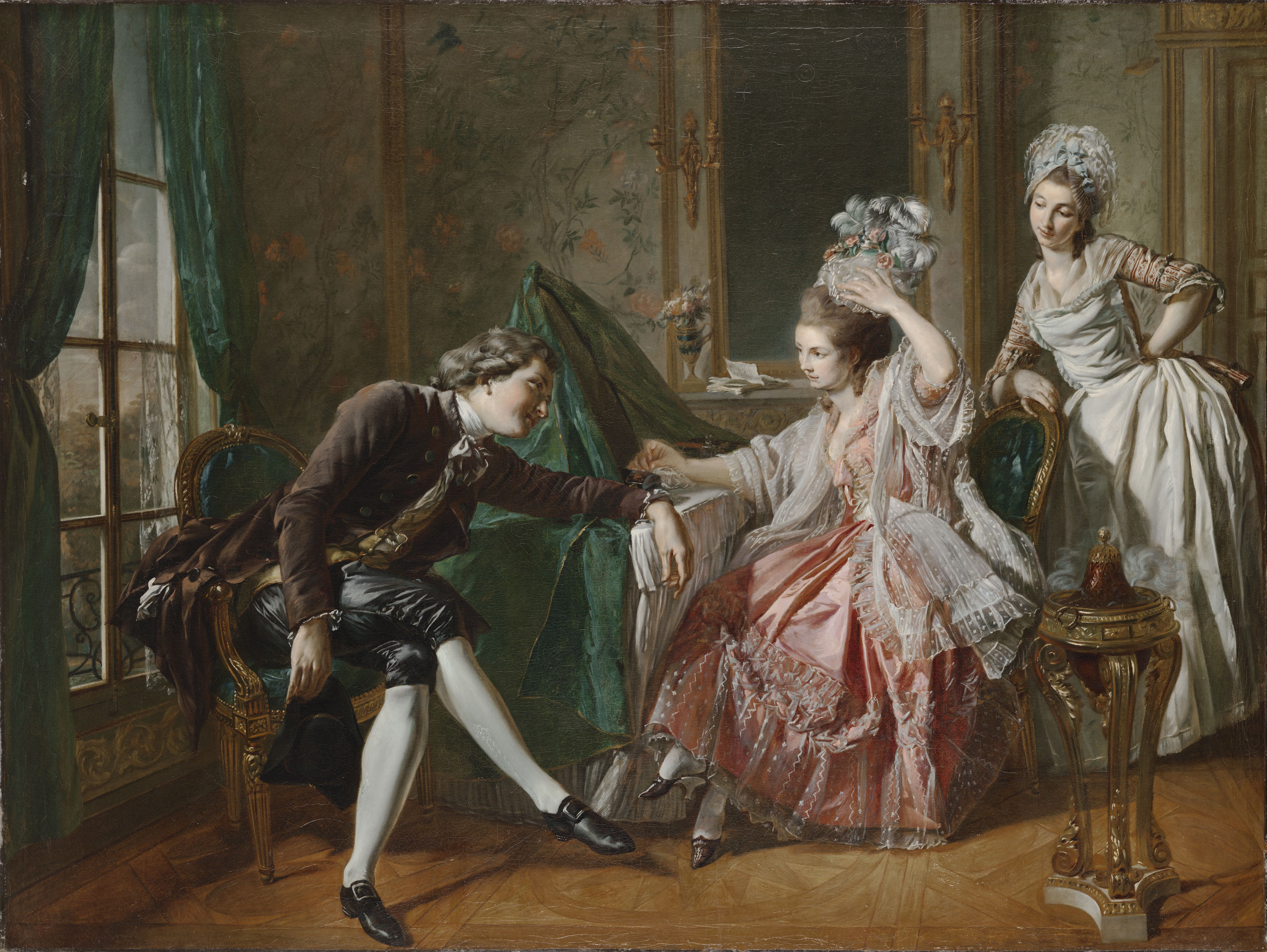
An Interior with a Lady, her Maid, and a Gentleman, 1776, Oil on canvas, 97 x 122 cm. Wadsworth Atheneum, Hartford, Connecticut

== Selected works ==
=== Drawings ===
- Seated Woman Sewing, 1788 - National Gallery of Art, Washington D.C.
- Young woman with a bowl and spoon - Courtauld Institute of Art

=== Paintings ===
- An interior with two ladies and a gentleman,"Portrait of a Woman", and "Musical Amusement."
