= Alfred Johannot =

French painter and engraver

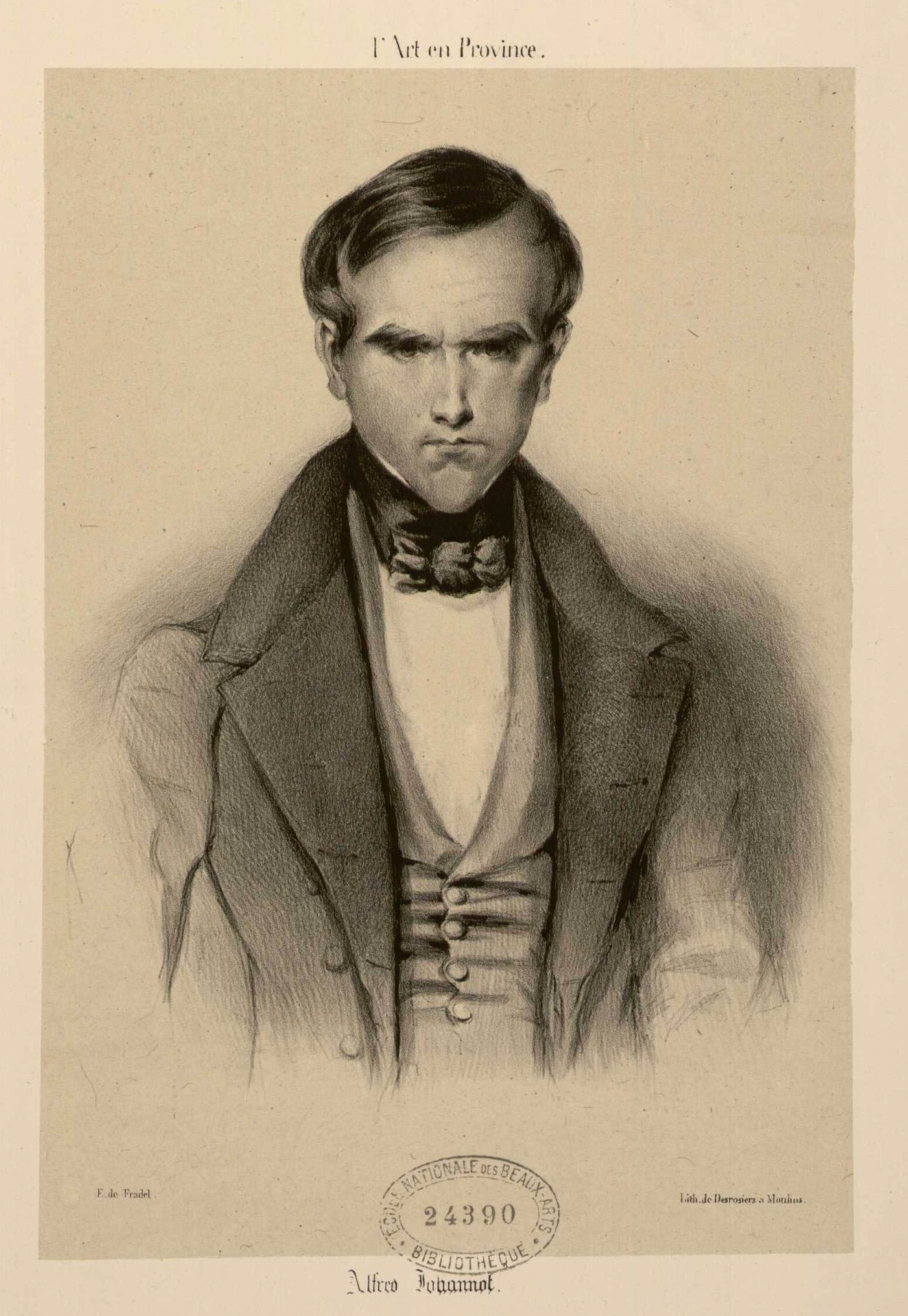
Alfred Johannot.

Alfred Johannot (pronounced [alfʁɛd ʒɔano]; March 21, 1800 – 1837) was a French painter and engraver born in Offenbach, Germany. His family were French refugees who went to Germany after the Edict of Nantes was revoked. He started out as an engraver, and then came into being a professional painter in 1831. His work was collected by Louis Philippe I and was displayed at the Palace of Versailles. He often painted contemporary court and ceremonial themes, before moving into historical French subjects.

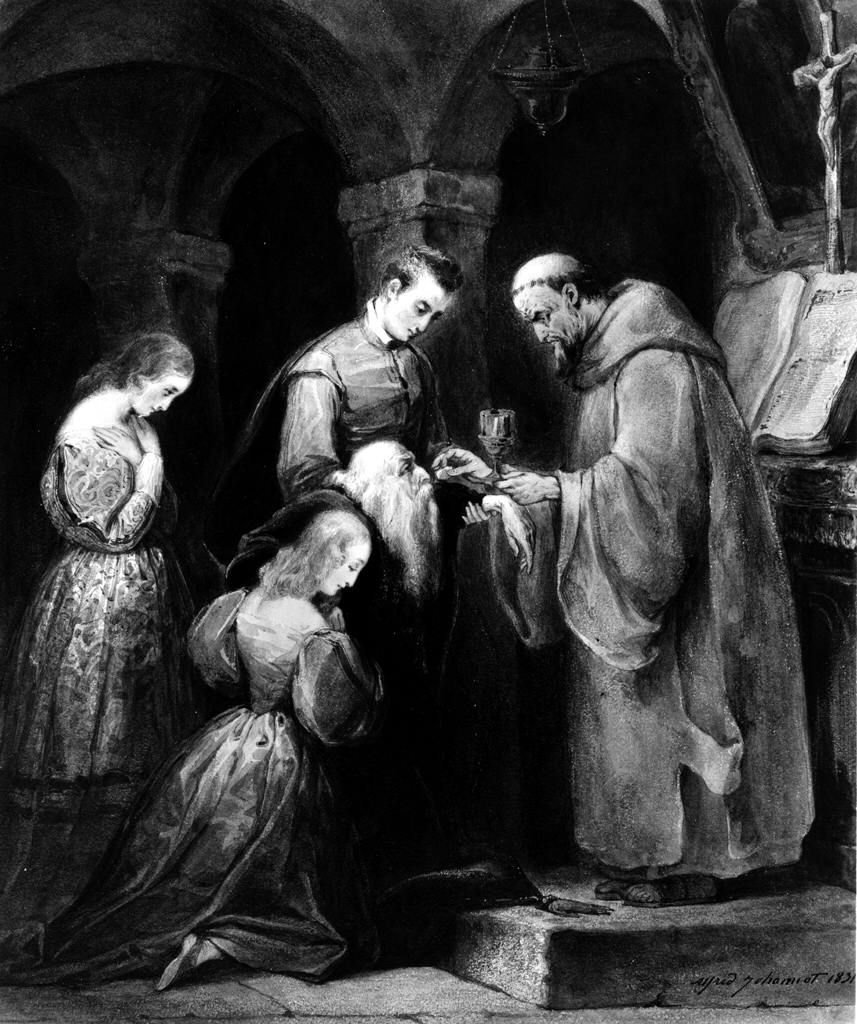
Aged Man Receiving Communion, by Alfred Johannot, 1831, Walters Art Museum

Johannot designed the covers for the first illustrated French editions for numerous British writers such as Lord Byron. He died on 7 December 1837.
