= Simon-Charles Miger =

French engraver

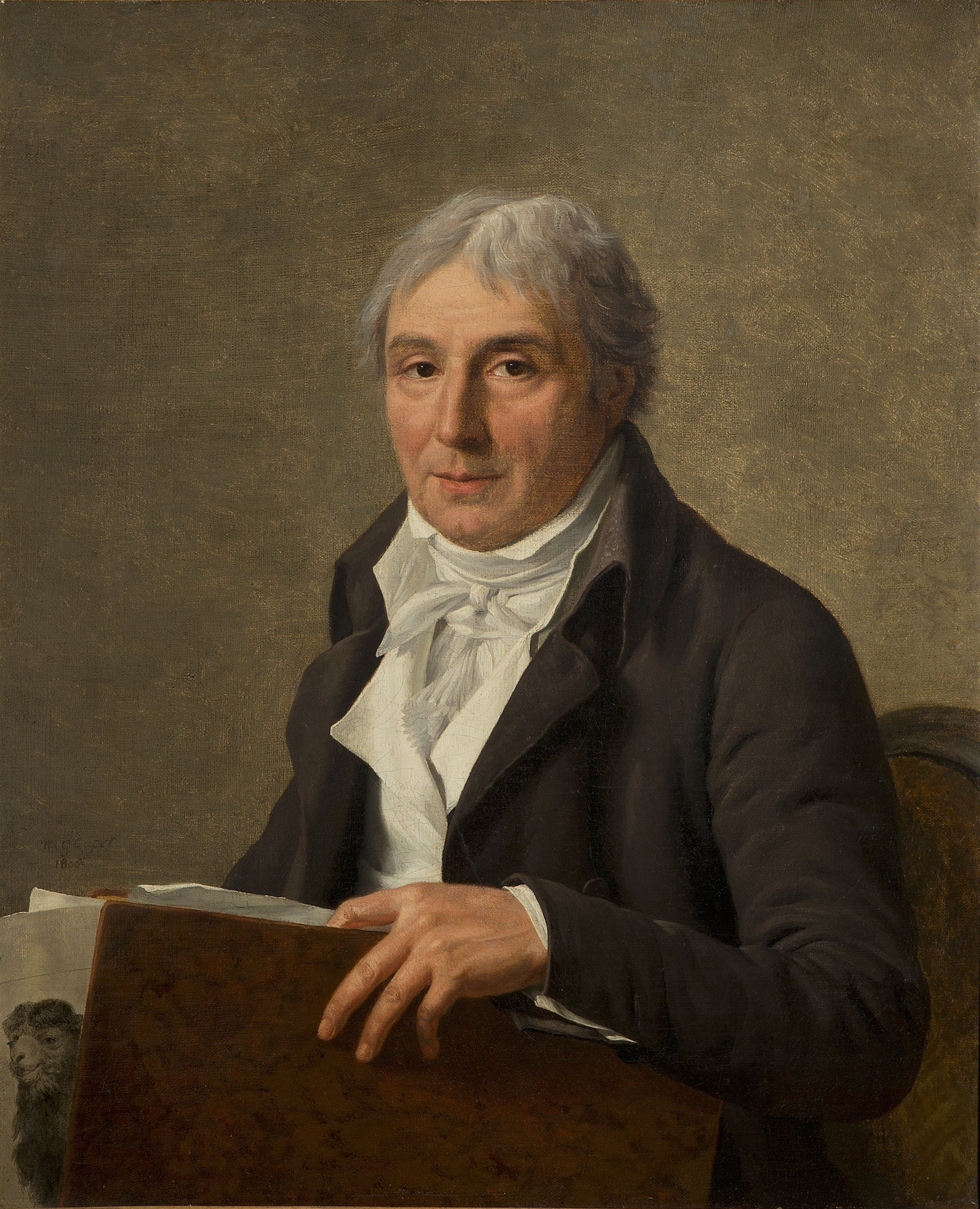
Portrait of Simon Charles Miger by Marie-Gabrielle Capet in 1806.

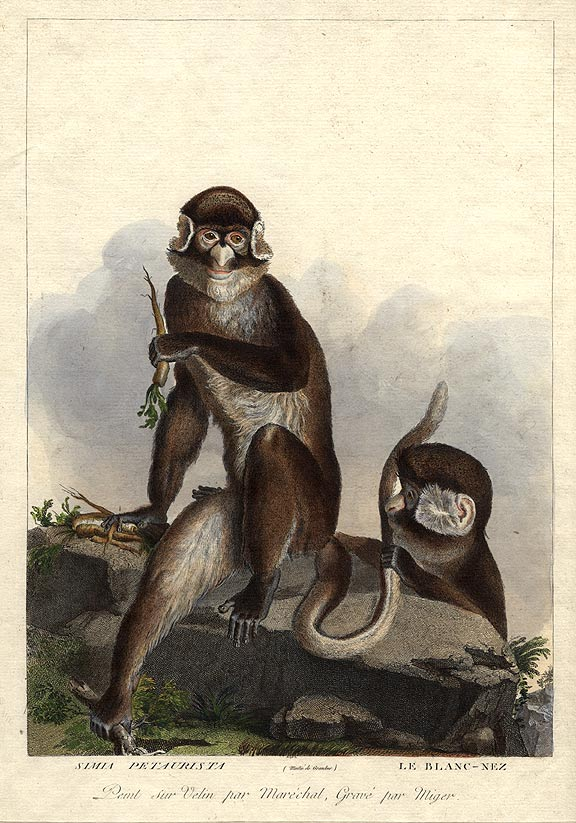
White-nosed monkey of Benin. Cercopithecus petaurista. Plate from La Ménagerie du Muséum by Simon-Charles Miger.

Simon-Charles Miger (Nemours, 19 February 1736 – Paris, 28 February 1828) was a French engraver, most notable for the plates he produced for La Ménagerie du Muséum national d'histoire naturelle by Lacépède, Saint-Hilaire and Cuvier.

== Life and work ==
Son of a tanner who sent him to study in Paris, Miger took various jobs including teacher, tutor and secretary before discovering a passion for engraving. He apprenticed to Charles Nicolas Cochin, which employed him as a clerk, and attended the workshop of Johann Georg Wille. He developed into a portraitist, and then fell in love with a woman with whom he courted for four years until his situation finally allow her to marry him. In 1778, Miger was accredited by the Académie royale de peinture et de sculpture, where he was admitted as a member in 1781. During the French Revolution, he argued alongside Jean-Michel Moreau and Adélaïde Labille-Guiard for the renovation of the statutes that were falling into disrepair. "The laws of the state, he says, are granted by the French people, those of the Academy shall be through all académicien people." But these reform proposals were rendered obsolete by the abolition of Academies, decreed by the National Convention in 1795. In 1800, Miger is charged with Bernard Germain de Lacépède to engrave the planks of his work on the menagerie of the National Museum of Natural History. He then continues to handle the chisel and compose verses until the age of nearly 90 years.

== Galleries ==
=== Menagerie ===
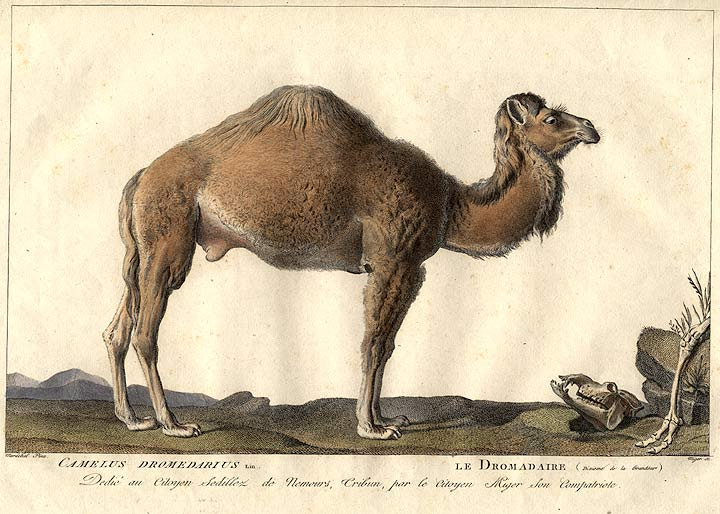
The Dromedary.
Camelus dromedarius.

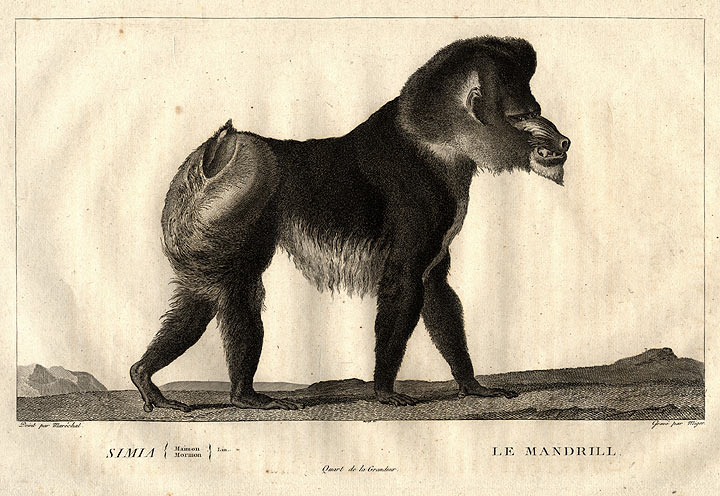
The Mandrill.
Mandrillus.

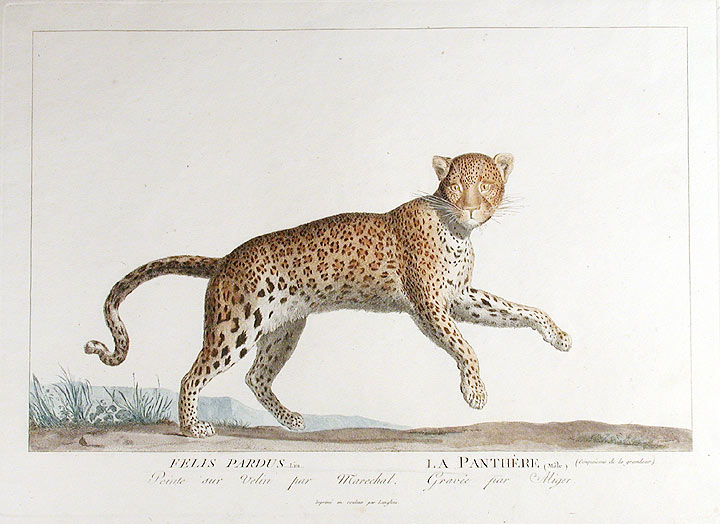
The Panther (male).
Panthera pardus.

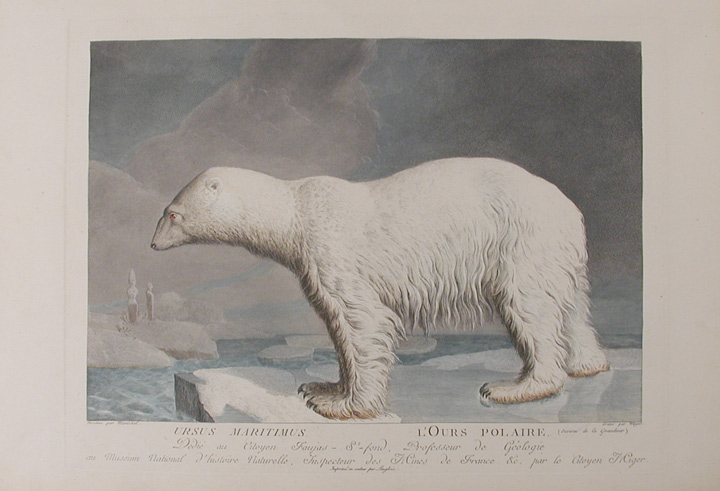
The Polar bear.
Ursus maritimus.

=== Portraits ===
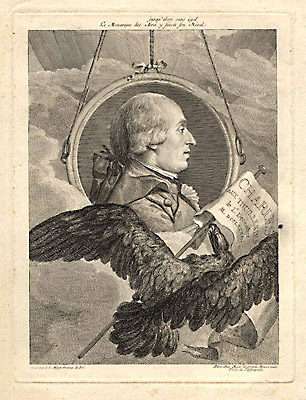
Charles at the Tuileries
on 1 December 1783.

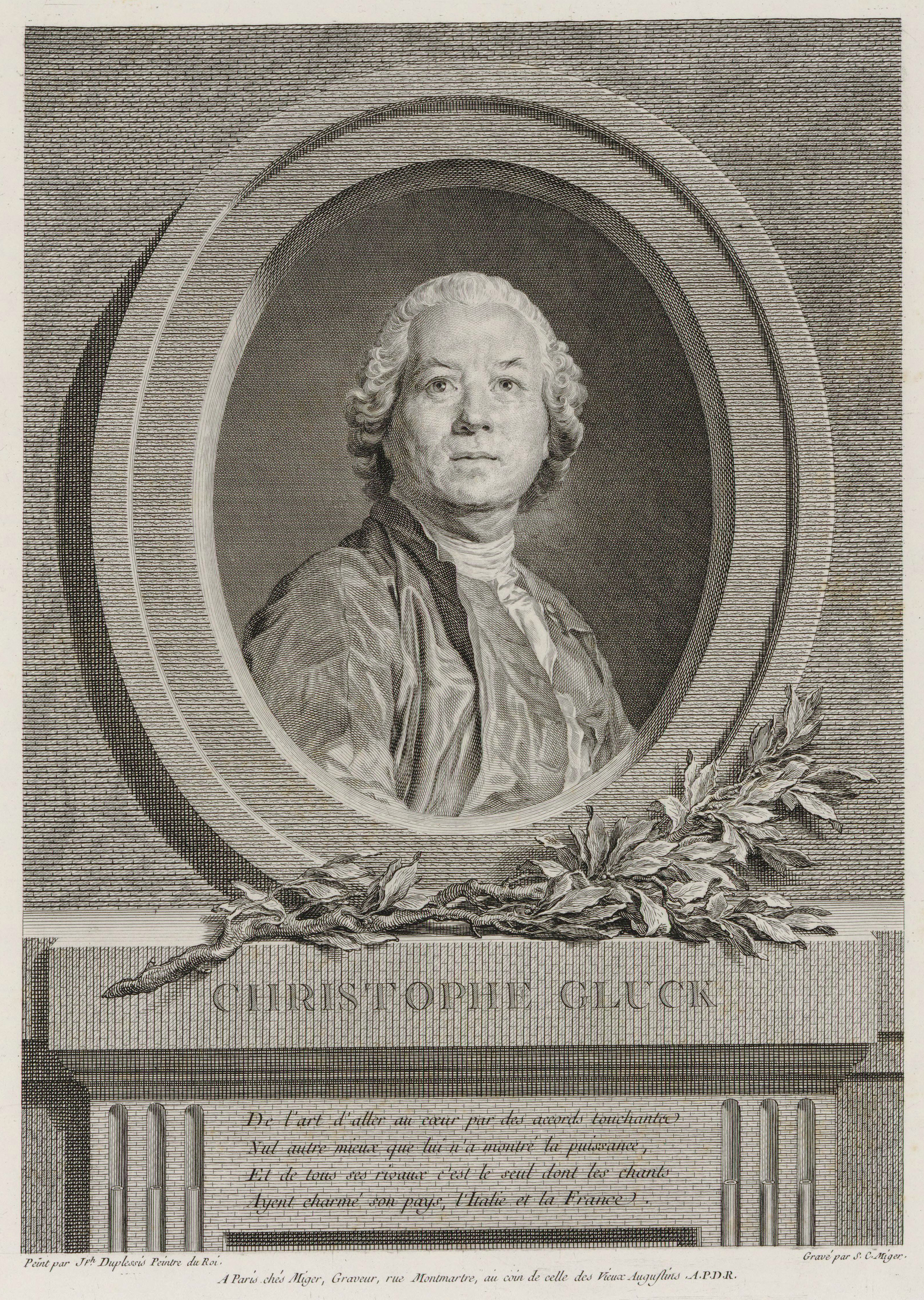
Christophe Gluck
after Joseph Siffred Duplessis.

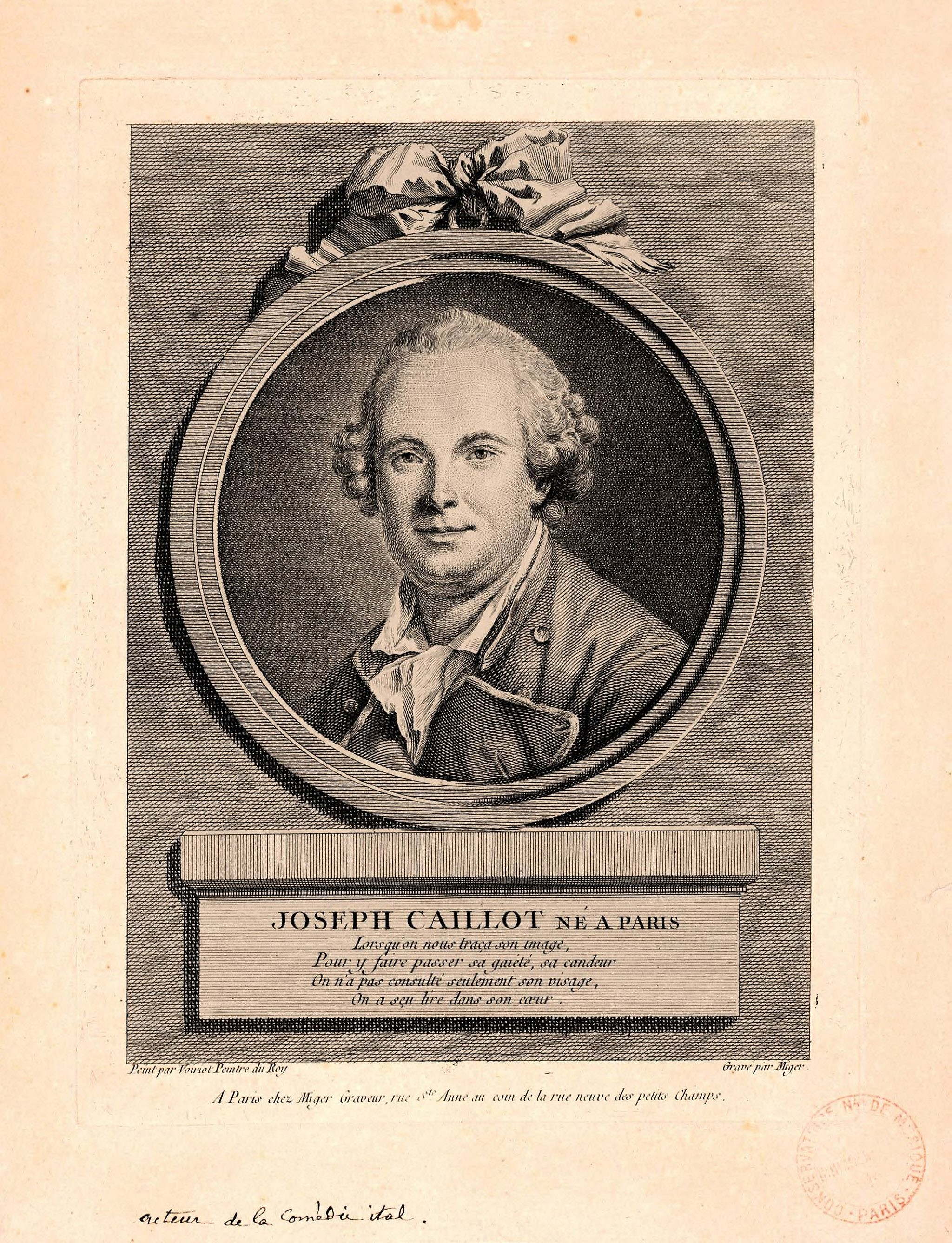
Joseph Caillot
after Guillaume Voiriot.

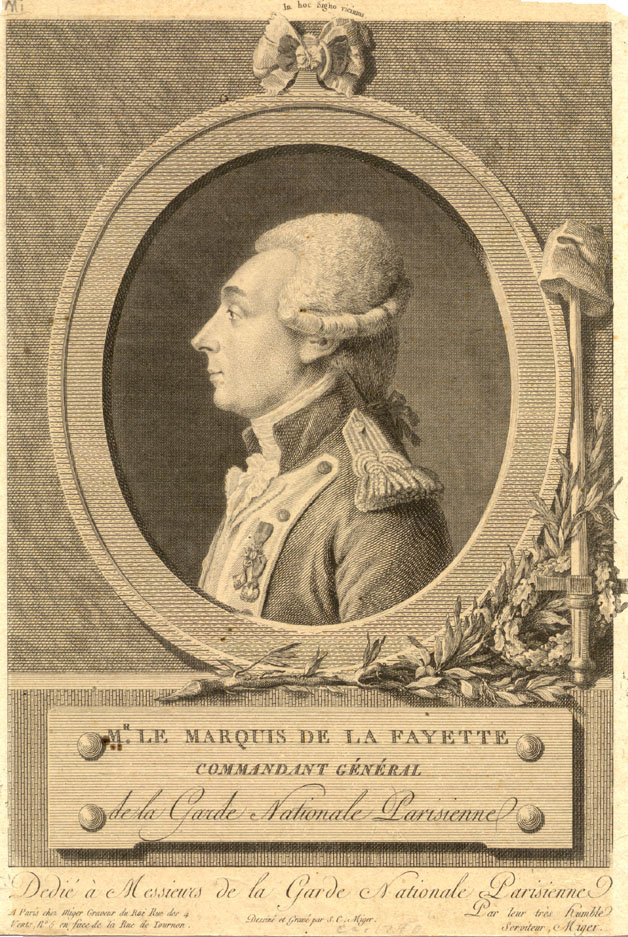
Mr le Marquis de La Fayette, commandant général of the Parisian National Guard.

== Iconography ==
- Émile Bellier de La Chavignerie, Biographie et catalogue de l'œuvre du graveur Miger, membre de l'ancienne Académie royale de peinture et de sculpture, son portrait avec fac-similé de son écriture (1856).
- Bernard-Germain-Étienne de Lacépède, Georges Cuvier, Étienne Geoffroy Saint-Hilaire, La Ménagerie du Muséum national d'histoire naturelle, ou Description et histoire des animaux qui y vivent et qui y ont vécu (2 volumes, 1804). Reissue : Artis Library Committee, Amsterdam, 1981. Engravings online
