= Jacques Firmin Beauvarlet =

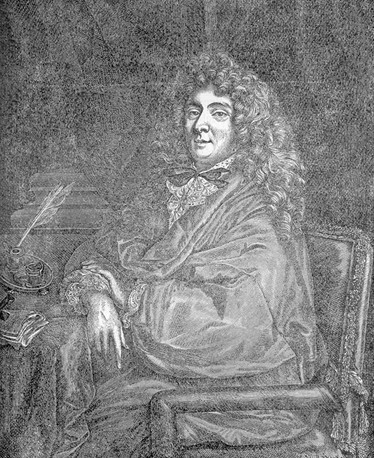
Molière, after Sébastien Bourdon.

Jacques Firmin Beauvarlet, a celebrated engraver, was born at Abbeville in 1731. He went to Paris when young, and was instructed in the art by Charles Dupuis and Laurent Cars. His early engravings were bold and free. Later, he developed a more finished and highly-wrought style of prints, executed with great neatness and delicacy.

In 1761, Beauvarlet married Catherine Jeanne Françoise Deschamps, a young lady who possessed some skill in engraving, but who died in 1769 at the age of thirty-one. He married again in 1770, but became for a second time a widower in 1779. Eight years later, in 1787, he married Marie Catherine Riollet, who, like his first wife, was an engraver. She was born in Paris in 1755, and is said to have died in 1788. Beauvarlet himself died in Paris in 1797.

== Portraits ==
- Marie Adelaide, daughter of Louis XV; after Nattier.
- Louis Joseph Xavier, Duke of Burgundy; after Frédou.
- Mlle. Clairon, actress; after Van Loo; by Laurent Cars and Beauvarlet.
- The Abbé Nollet; after La Tour.
- Edmé Bouchardon, sculptor; after Drouais. 1776.
- Jean Baptiste-Poquelin de Moliere; after S. Bourdon (pictured).
- The Marquis de Bomballes; after Moslin and Vernet.
- Catharine, Princess Galizin; medallion.
- Ferdinand, Duke of Brunswick.
- Madame du Barry; after Drouais.

== Subjects after various masters ==
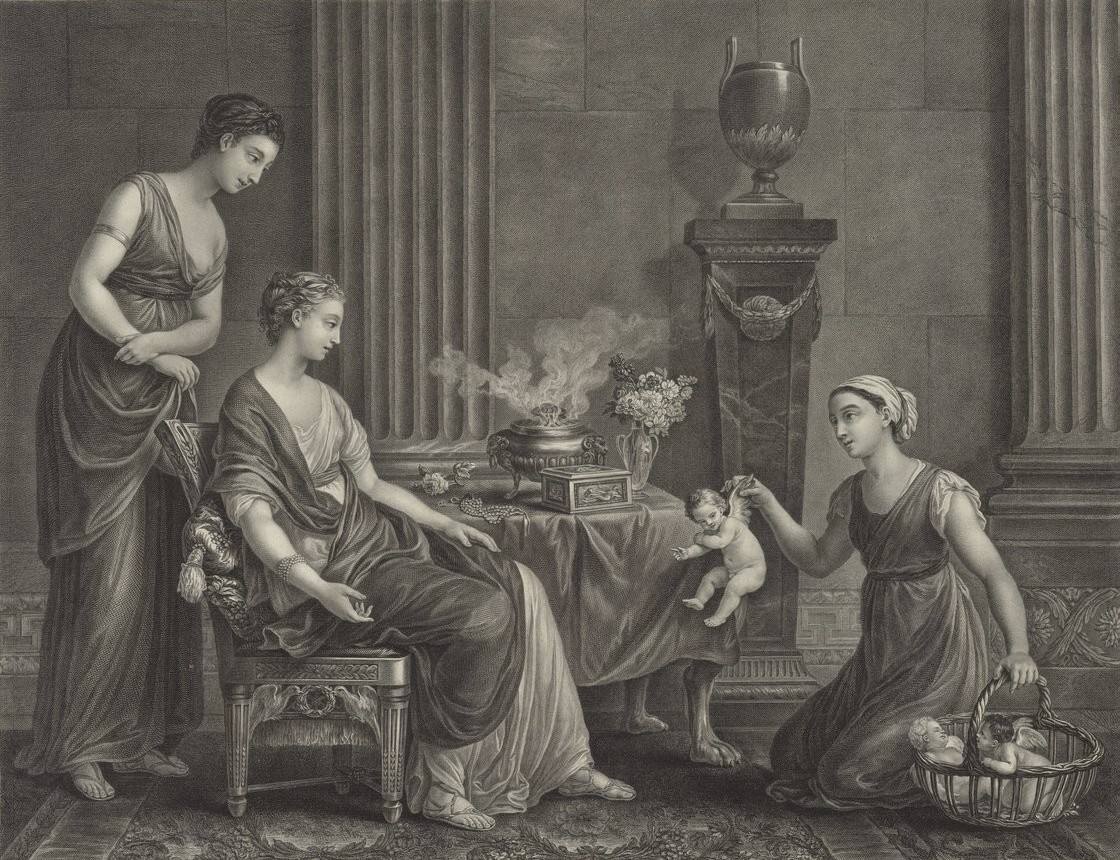
La marchande d'amours or Love's merchant after Joseph-Marie Vien.

- Lot and his Daughters; after Luca Giordano.
- Susannah and the Elders; after the same.
- Perseus, combating Phineus, shows the Head of Medusa; after the same.
- Acis and Galatea; after the same.
- The Judgment of Paris; after the same.
- The Rape of Europa; after the same.
- The Rape of the Sabines; after the same.
- Susannah and the Elders; after Guido Canlassi.
- The Sewers; after Guido Reni; very highly finished.
- The Incredulity of Thomas; after Calabrese.
- Venus lamenting the Death of Adonis; after A. Turchi.
- La Rusée; after C. Vega.
- The Double Surprise; after Ger. Dou.
- The Fisherman; after H. Carré.
- The Tric-trac Players: after Teniers.
- The Bagpiper; after the same.
- The Burgomaster; after Ostade.
- Diana and Actaeon; after Rottenhammer.
- The Bathers; after Boucher.
- The Trap; after the same.
- Cupid chained by the Graces; after the same.
- The Children of the Count de Béthune; after Drouais.
- Le Colin Maillard; after Fragonard.
- The Chastity of Joseph; after Nattier.
- Susannah and the Elders; after Vien.
- The Offering to Venus; after the same.
- The Offering to Ceres; after the same.
- Cupid holding his Bow; after C. van Loo.
- La Confidence; after the same.
- The Sultana; after the same.
- Lecture Espagnole; after the same.
- Conversation Espagnole; after the same.
- Telemachus in the Island of Calypso; after Raoux.
- The Toilet, and the Return from the Ball; two companions; after De Troy.
- Seven prints of the History of Esther; after J. F. de Troy.
- A Subject from an Antique Painting at Herculaneum.

A catalogue of his works was published at Abbeville in 1860 by l'Abbé Dairaine.
