= Langlois =

Langlois or L'Anglois is a surname of French origin. Notable people with the surname include:

- Aimé Langlois (1880–1954), Liberal party member of the Canadian House of Commons
- Al Langlois (1934–2020), Canadian ice hockey player
- Alexandre Langlois (1788–1854), French Indologist and translator
- Anabelle Langlois (born 1981), Canadian pairs figure skater
- Bruno Langlois (born 1979), Canadian racing cyclist
- Charles Langlois (actor) (1692–1762), French actor who spent a large part of his career in Sweden
- Charles Langlois (politician) (born 1938), member of the Canadian House of Commons from 1988 to 1993
- Charles-Victor Langlois (1863–1929) French historian and paleographer who taught at the Sorbonne
- Charlie Langlois (1894–1965), Canadian professional hockey player
- Chibly Langlois (born 1958), Haitian cardinal of the Roman Catholic Church
- Christian Langlois (born 1963), Film director from Montreal, Canada
- Daniel Langlois, Canadian media company founder and philanthropist
- Denis Langlois (race walker) (born 1968), French race walker
- Ernest Langlois (1857–1924), French medievalist, professor at the University of Lille
- Espérance Langlois (1805–1864), French painter and printmaker
- Esther Langlois (1571–1624), Scottish miniaturist, embroiderer, calligrapher, translator and writer
- Étienne, stage name of Steven Langlois (born 1971), Warner Music Canada recording artist
- Eustache-Hyacinthe Langlois (3 August 1777 – 29 September 1837), French painter, draftsman, engraver and writer
- François Langlois (born 1948), Canadian politician and lawyer
- François L’Anglois (1589–1647) a French painter, engraver, printer, bookseller, publisher and art dealer
- Godfroy Langlois (1866–1928), politician, journalist and lawyer in Quebec
- Guillaume Langlois, Quebec politician
- Henri Langlois (1914–1977), pioneer of film preservation and restoration
- Henri Delisle Langlois, Canadian drag queen
- Hippolyte Langlois (1839–1912), French general and writer on military science
- Jean François Langlois (1808–?), New Zealand whaler and coloniser
- Jean Langlois (1824–1886), Quebec lawyer, professor, and political figure
- Jean-Charles Langlois (1789–1870), French soldier and painter
- Joseph Langlois (1909–1964), Liberal party member of the Canadian House of Commons
- Joseph-Alphonse Langlois (1860–1927), politician Quebec, Canada and a Member of the Legislative Assembly of Quebec (MLA)
- Léopold Langlois (1913–1996), Canadian lawyer and parliamentarian
- Lisa Langlois (born 1959), Canadian actress
- Lloyd Langlois (born 1962), Canadian freestyle skier
- Pascal Langlois, English actor, played supporting roles in television dramas since 1999
- Paul Langlois (born 1964), Canadian guitarist
- Paul Langlois (Canadian politician) (1926–2012), Liberal party member of the Canadian House of Commons
- Philippe Langlois (1817–1884), Norman language writer in Jèrriais
- Pierre Langlois (canoer) (born 1958), French sprint canoeist who competed in the early 1980s
- Pierre Langlois (economist), Canadian economist and political strategist
- Pierre Langlois (politician) (1750–1830), merchant and political figure in Lower Canada
- Polyclès Langlois (29 September 1814 – 30 November 1872), French writer, cartoonist and painter
- Raymond Langlois (1936–1996), Ralliement créditiste and Social Credit party member of the Canadian House of Commons
- Richard Normand Langlois (born 1952), American economist and currently professor
- Stephen Langlois, Chicago area chef and author of Prairie: Cuisine from the Heartland (1991)
- Thomas Langlois Lefroy (1776–1869), Irish-Huguenot politician and judge
- Yves Langlois (born 1947), member of terrorist group Front de libération du Québec

== Etymology ==
The name comes from the French language. Langlois is a contracted form of L'Anglois. L’ is a contraction of the masculine definite article "le" and is translated as "the". Anglois is a disused French form of "anglais", the adjective of "Angleterre", England.

== See also ==
- Langlois de Sézanne (1757–1845), French portraitist and pastel artist
- Langlois, Oregon, unincorporated community in Curry County, Oregon, United States, on the Oregon Coast
- Langlois Bridge, drawbridge in Arles, France, subject of several paintings by Vincent van Gogh in 1888
  - Langlois Bridge at Arles (Van Gogh series)
- Daniel Langlois Foundation, non-profit, philanthropic organization
- Langlois reagent, Sodium trifluoromethanesulfinate (CF_{3}SO_{2}Na), the sodium salt of trifluoromethanesulfinic acid
- Langloisia
