= Maurice Quentin de La Tour =

French painter (1704–1788)

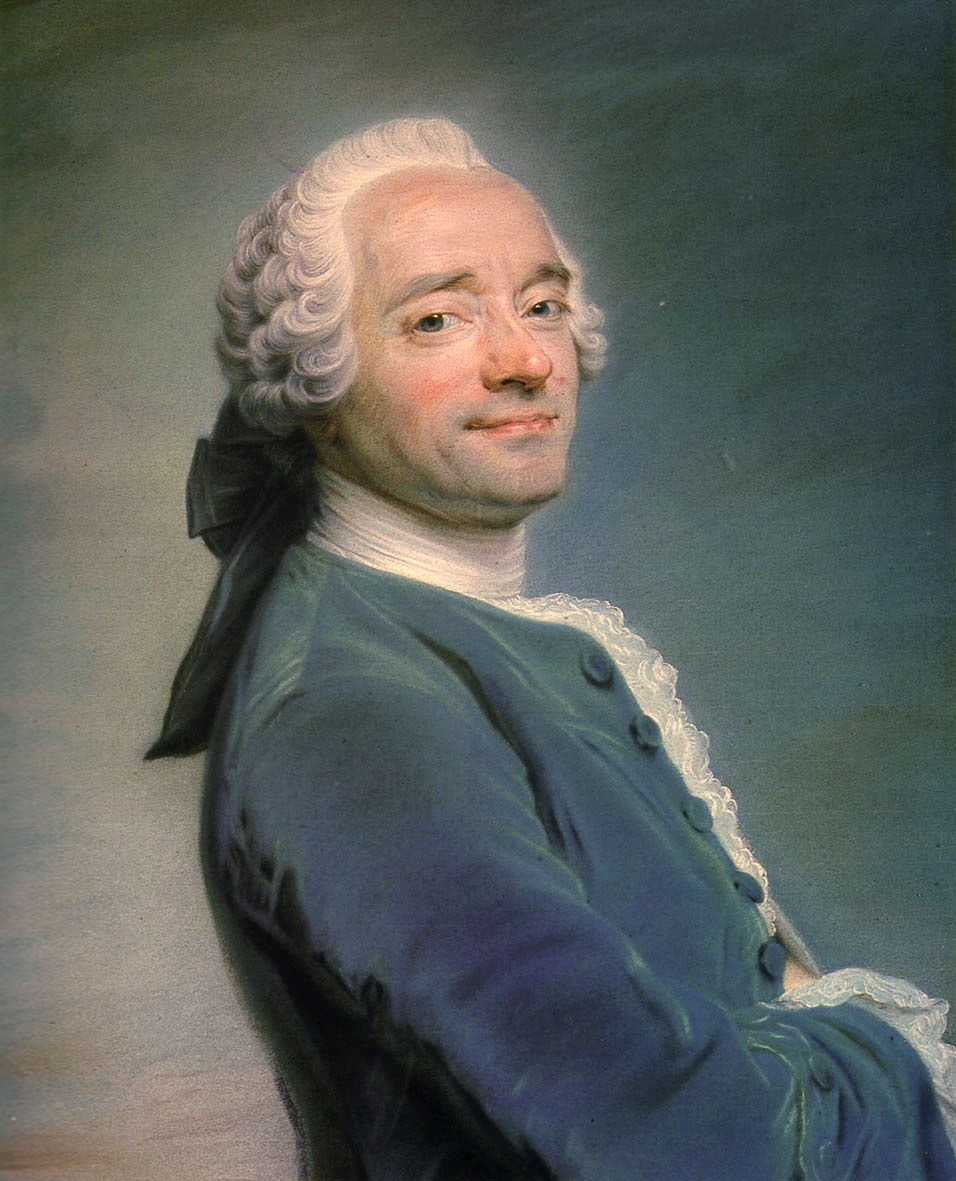
- Self-portrait with Lace Jabot (c. 1751)
- Born: Maurice-Quentin Delatour; 5 September 1704; Saint-Quentin, Picardy, Kingdom of France
- Died: 17 February 1788 (aged 83); Saint-Quentin, Picardy, Kingdom of France
- Known for: Pastel

Maurice Quentin de La Tour (French pronunciation: [mɔʁis kɑ̃tɛ̃ də la tuʁ]; 5 September 1704 – 17 February 1788) was a French painter who specialised in portrait painting using pastels in the Rococo style. Among his most famous subjects were Voltaire, Jean-Jacques Rousseau, Louis XV, and Madame de Pompadour.

== Life ==
Maurice Quentin de La Tour was born on 5 September 1704 in Saint-Quentin. He was the third son of a musician, François de La Tour. François was from Laon and he was the son of a master mason, Jean de La Tour, of Laon and Saint-Quentin, who died in 1674. François de La Tour apparently was successively a trumpet-player for the rifle regiment of the Duc du Maine, and musician to the master of the collegiate church of Saint-Quentin. He is popularly said to have disapproved of his son taking up the arts, but there is nothing to support this. According to François Marandet in 2002, an apprenticeship was arranged for the young Maurice, with a painter named Dupouch, from 12 October 1719, but it is not known when this contract was terminated. Little is known of de La Tour's background until, when barely nineteen, he went to Paris indefinitely, fleeing an indiscretion concerning his cousin, Anne Bougier; by this age he was claiming painting as his profession. After travelling briefly to England in 1725, he returned to Paris in 1727, where he was encouraged to begin working as a portraitist in pastels. His earliest known portrait, which is attested only by an engraving made in 1731 by Langlois, was a portrait of Voltaire.

In 1737, at the Paris Salon, de La Tour exhibited the portraits of Madame Boucher, the wife of the painter François Boucher, and l'Auteur qui rit or Self-Portrait, Laughing (musée du Louvre), the first of a series of 150 portraits that served as one of the glories of the Paris Salon for the next 36 years. Nevertheless, the painter Joseph Ducreux claimed to be his only student (although this is unlikely). On 25 May 1737, de La Tour was officially recognised (agréé) by the Royal Academy of Painting and Sculpture, and soon attracted the attention of the French court. According to Jeffares, he had an apartment in the Palais du Louvre in 1745. By the late 1760s, his portraiture of the royal family had ceased. De La Tour was popularly perceived as endowing his portrait subjects with a distinctive charm and intelligence, while his delicate but sure touch with the pastel medium rendered a pleasing softness to their features.

Contemporary accounts describe de La Tour's nature as lively, good-humoured, but eccentric. In many of his self-portraits he depicts himself smiling out from the frame towards the viewer; Laura Cumming states of de La Tour that "where other artists make heavy weather of portraying themselves, he takes the task lightly and seems to have produced more glad-faced self-portraits than any other artist". However, being of an excessively nervous disposition (which eventually descended into dementia), and an exacting practitioner, he has also been described as over-engineering his work, to the point of spoiling it.

As de La Tour's wealth increased from his commissions, so did his philanthropy: he founded a school for drawing in his native Saint-Quentin and donated towards impoverished women in confinement and disabled and ageing artisans and artists. He was also advisor and benefactor to the Royal Academy of Painting and Sculpture in Paris, and the Academy of Sciences and Belles Lettres of Amiens. Eventually confined to his home and to the care of his brother, Jean-François, because of encroaching mental illness, he retired at the age of 80 to Saint-Quentin, where he died intestate at the age of 83 (he had revoked earlier wills). Jean-François (d. 1807), chevalier de l'ordre royal militaire de Saint-Louis, was the natural heir to his estate.

== Gallery ==
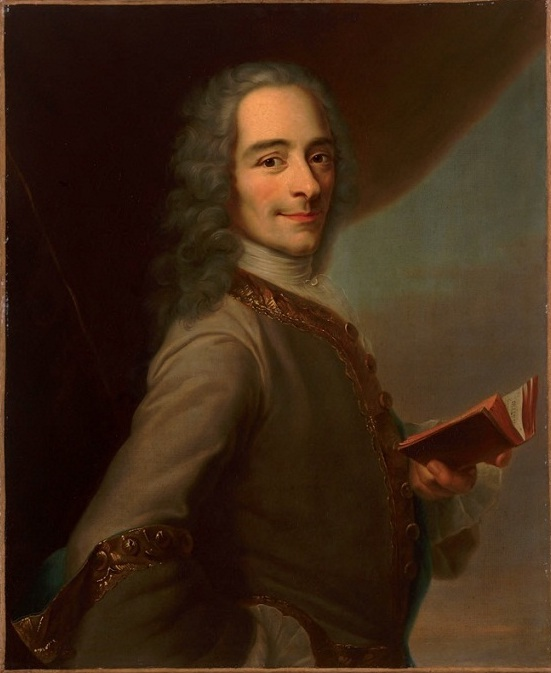
Voltaire

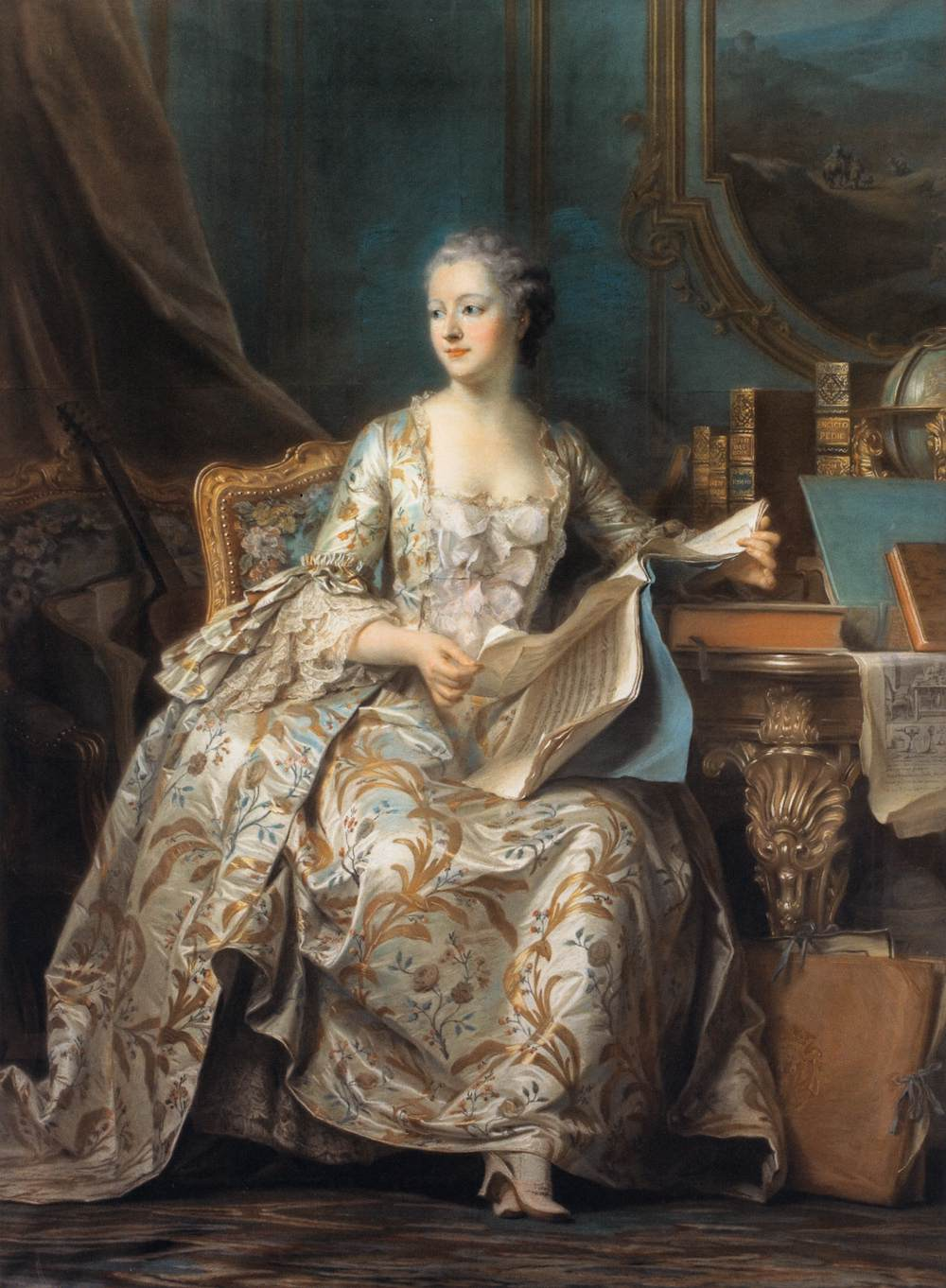
Madame de Pompadour

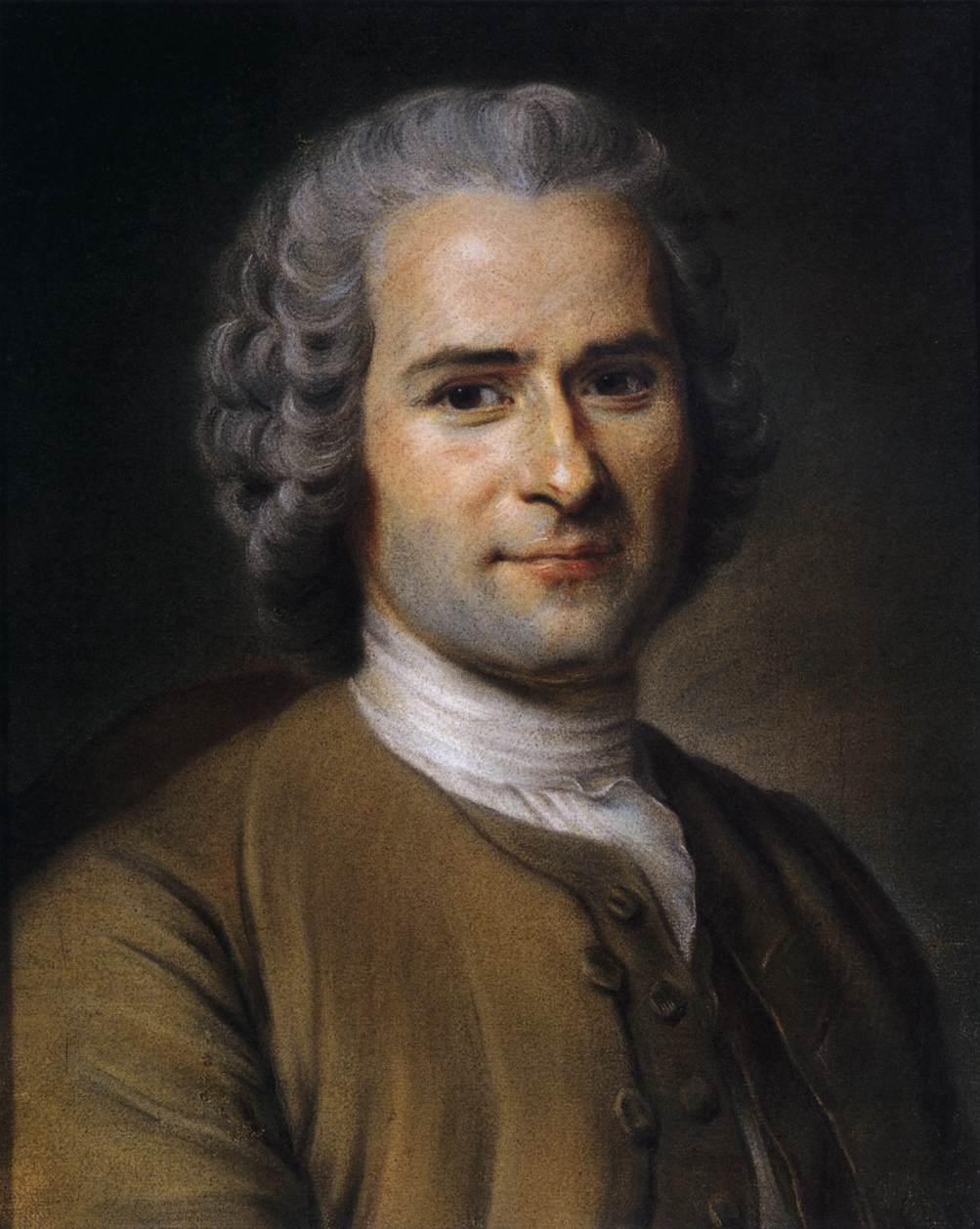
Jean-Jacques Rousseau

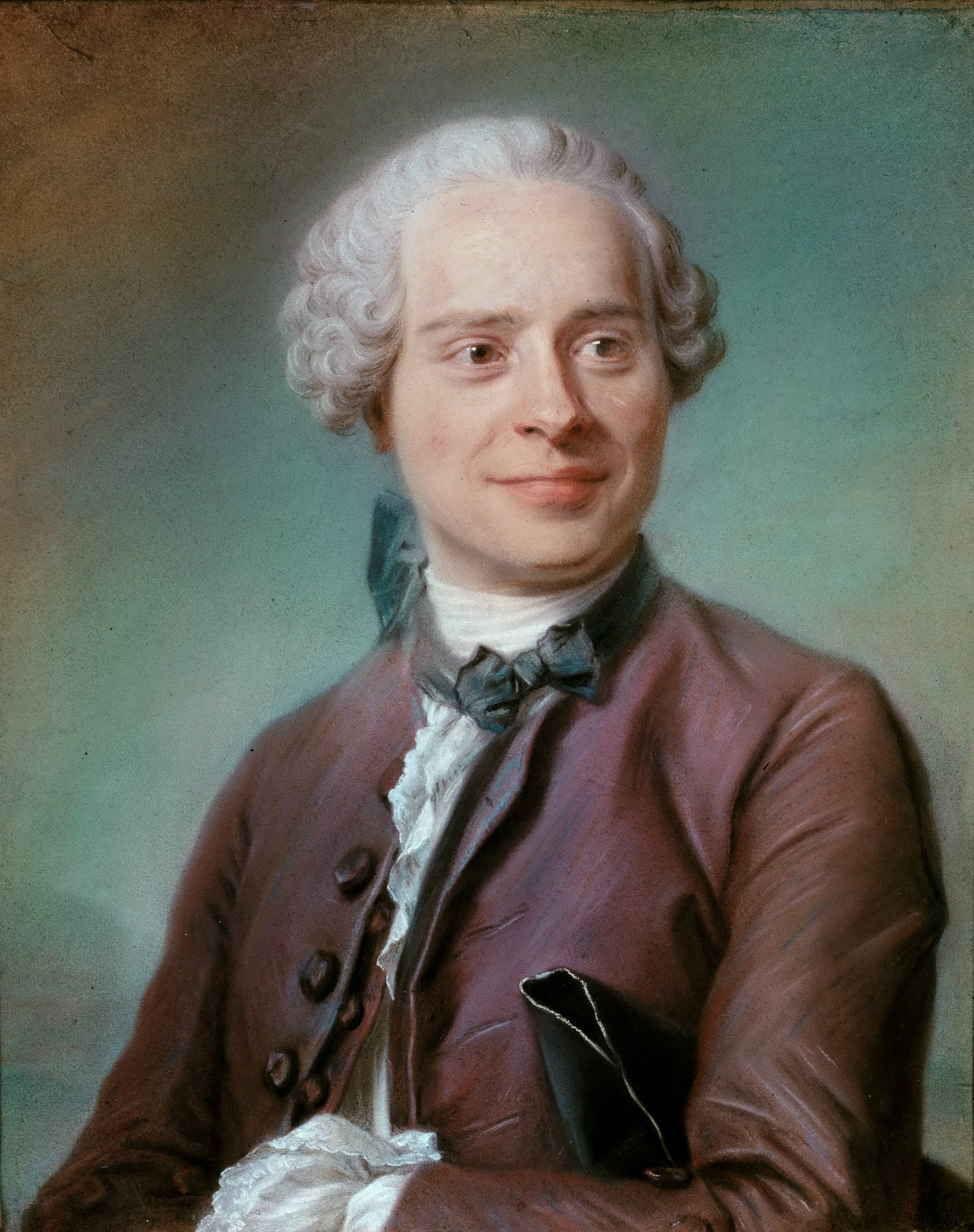
Jean d'Alembert

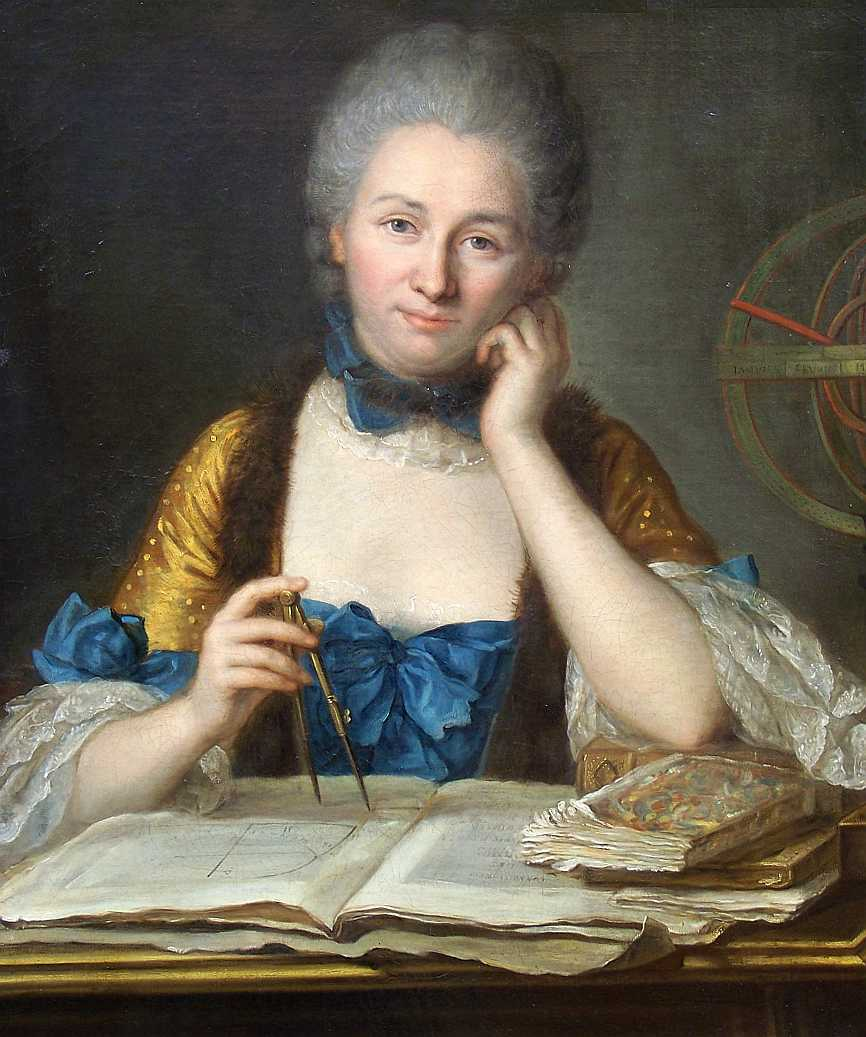
Émilie du Chatelet

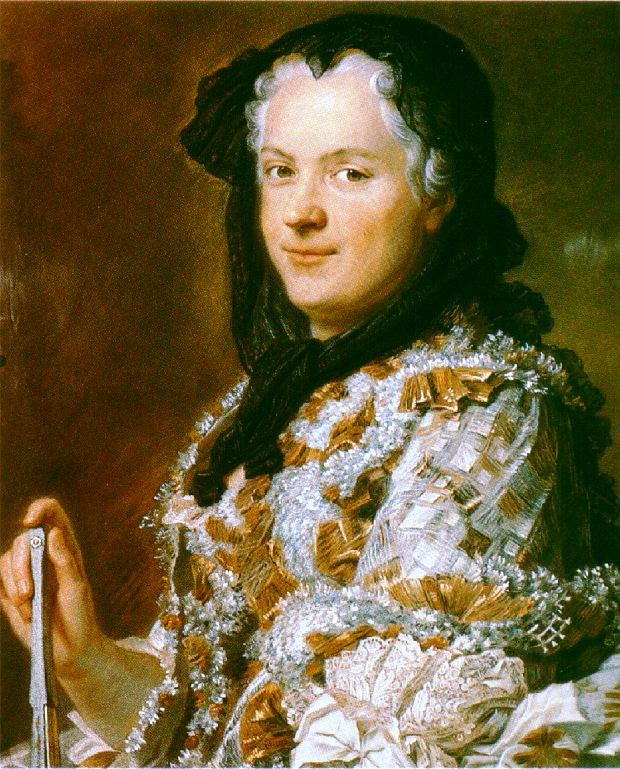
Queen Marie Leszczyńska

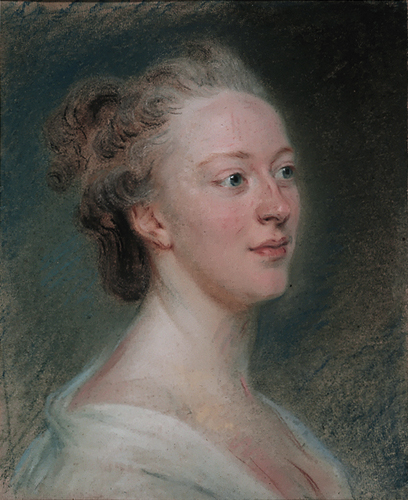
Isabelle de Charrière (1766)

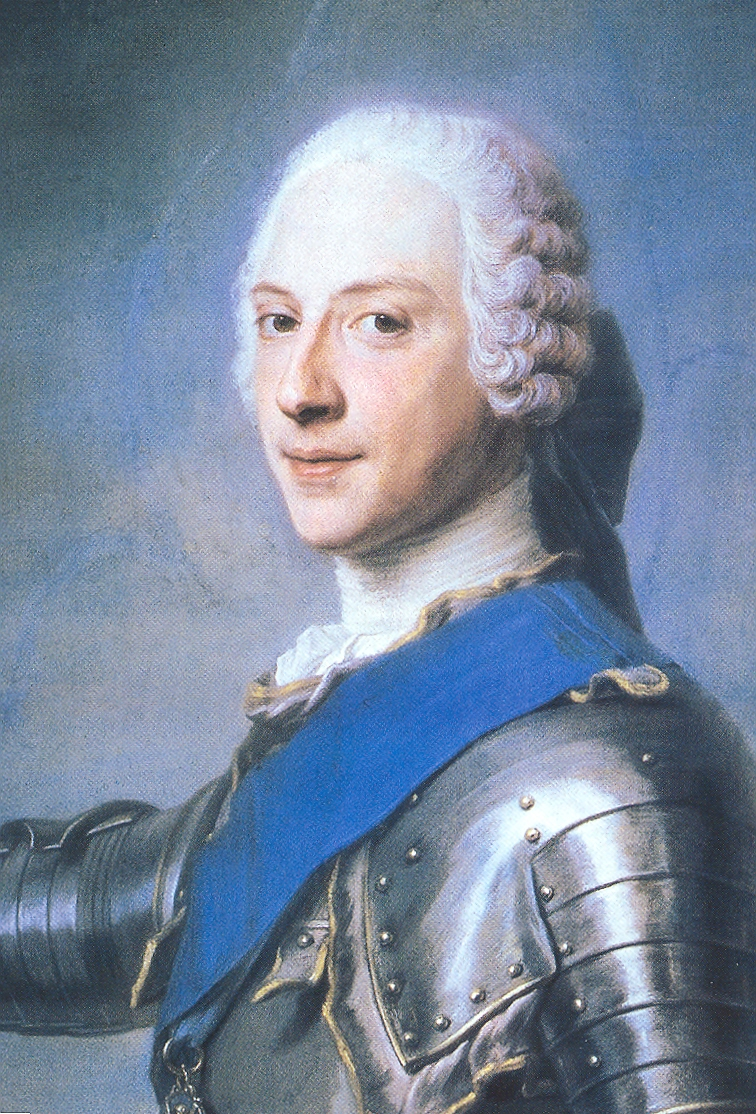
Prince Henry Benedict Stuart

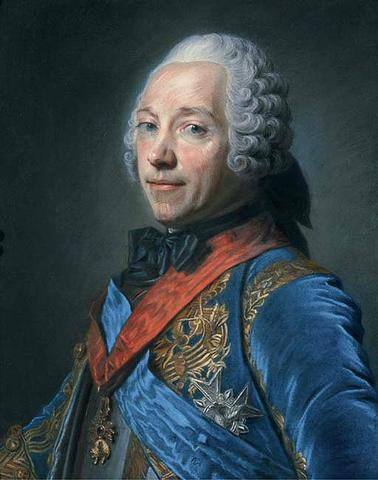
Charles Louis Auguste Fouquet

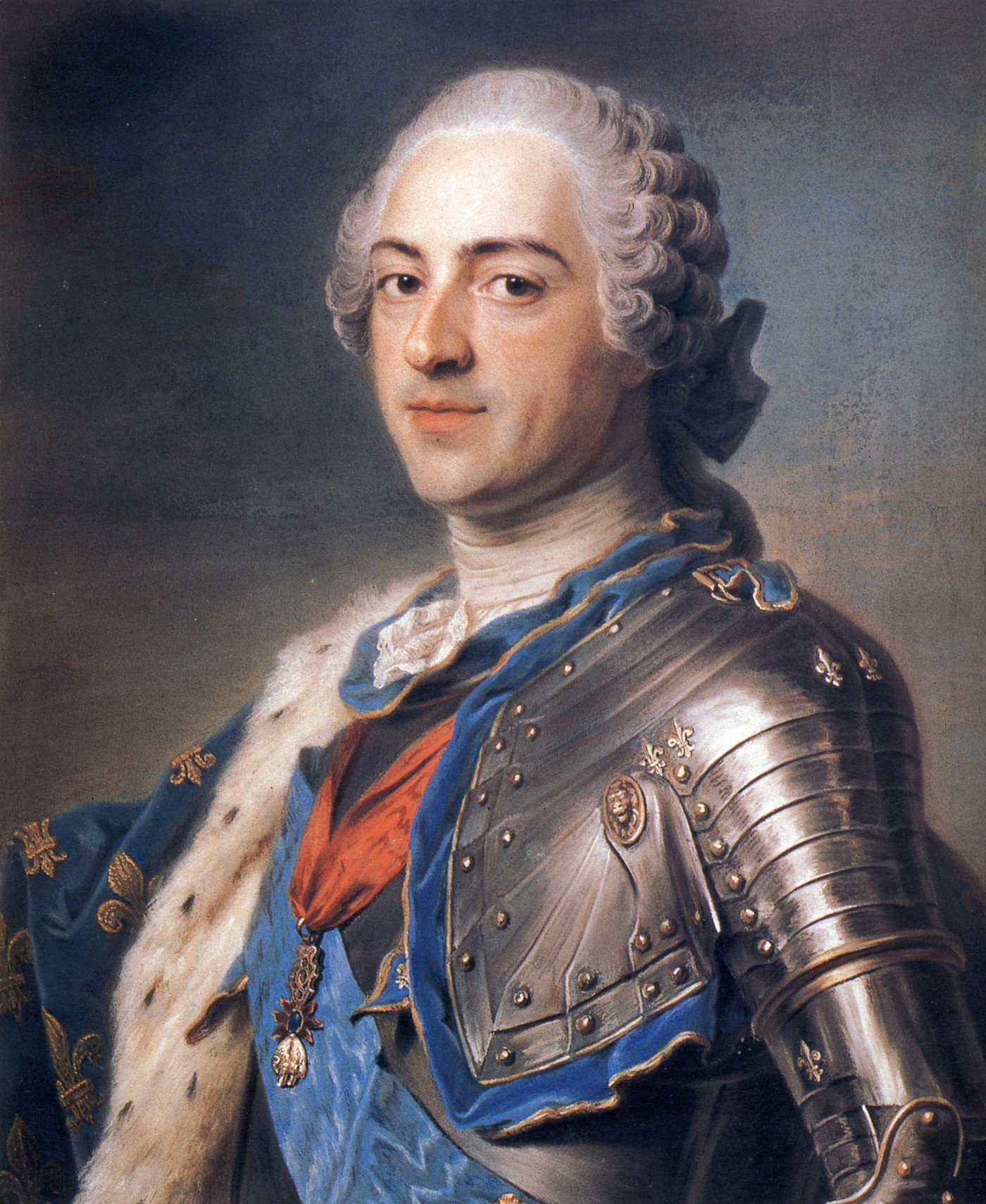
King Louis XV

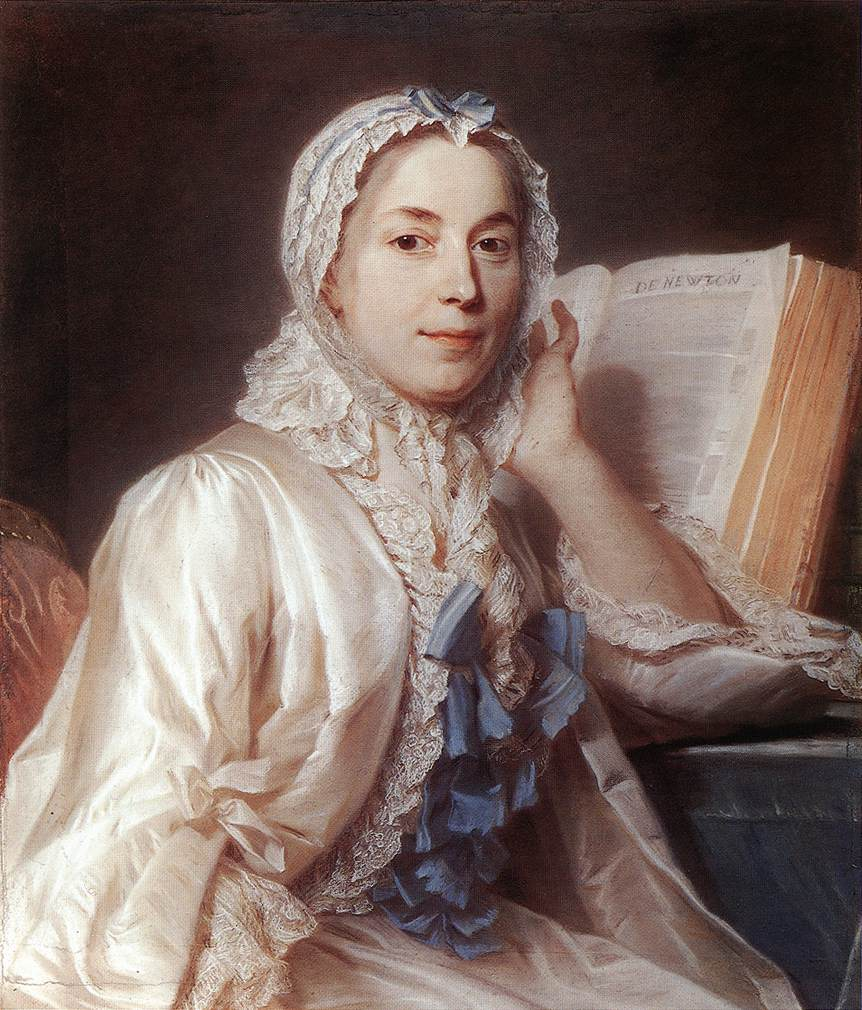
Mlle Ferrand Meditating on Newton

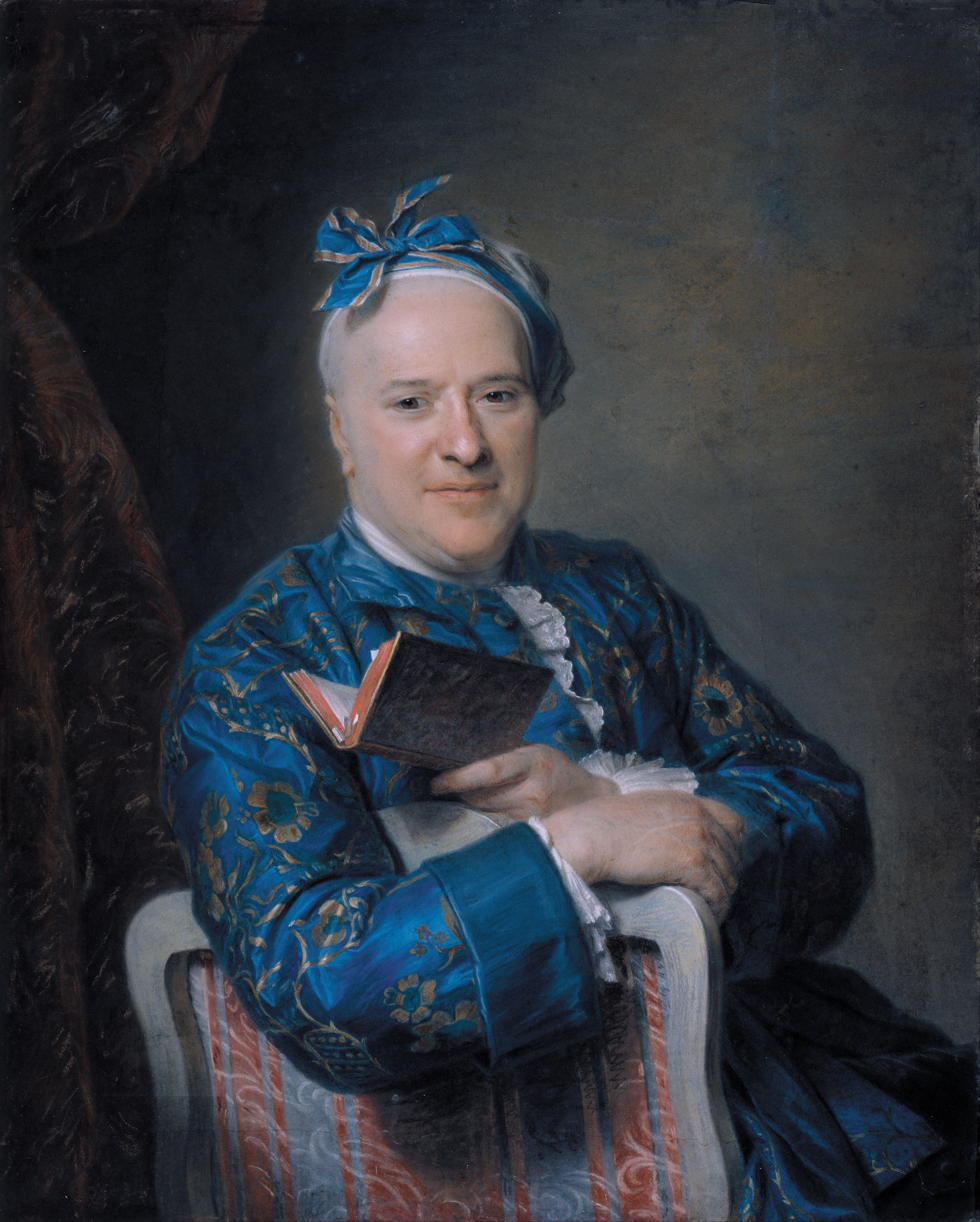
Pierre-Louis Laideguive

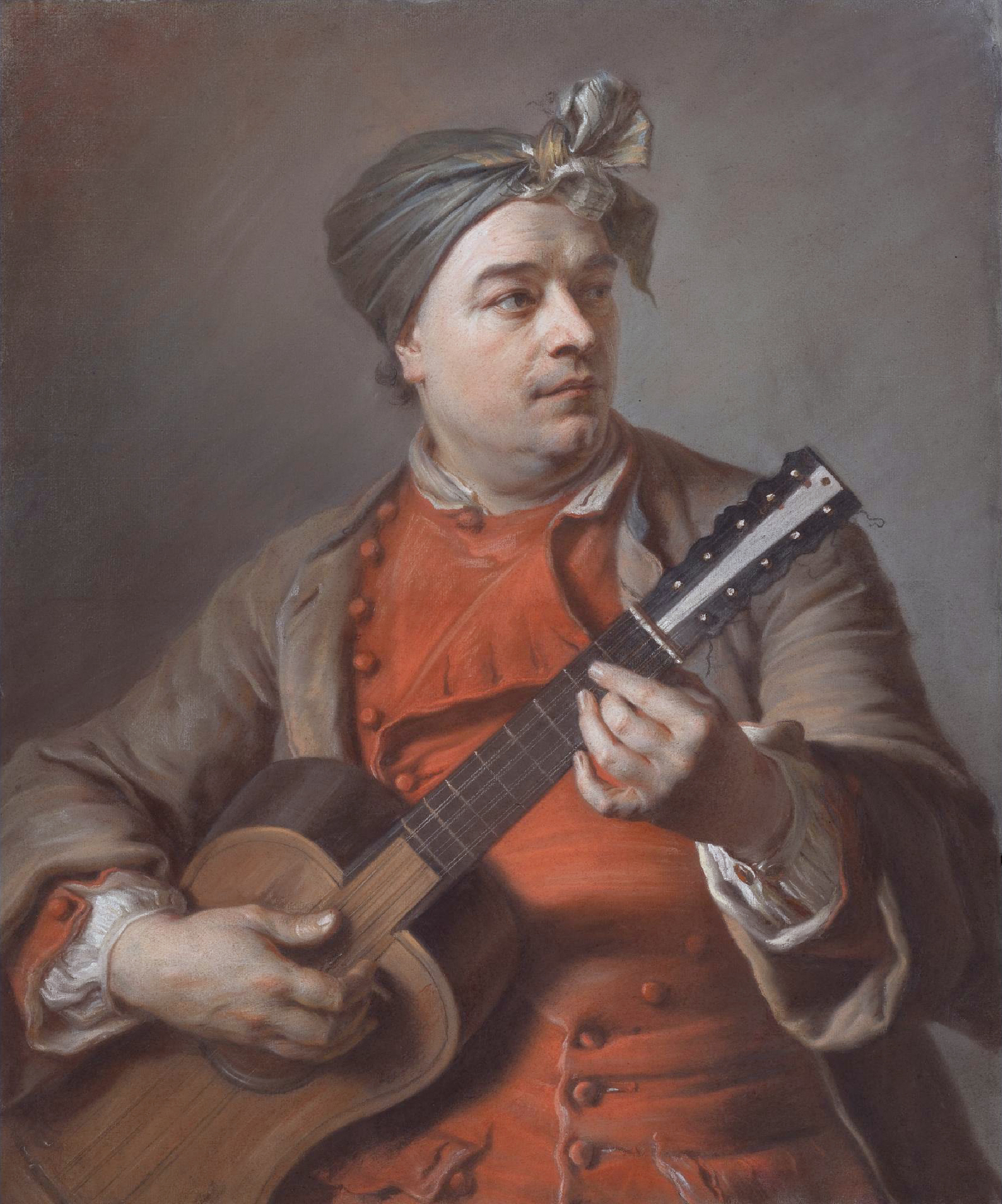
Jacques du Mont Le Romain

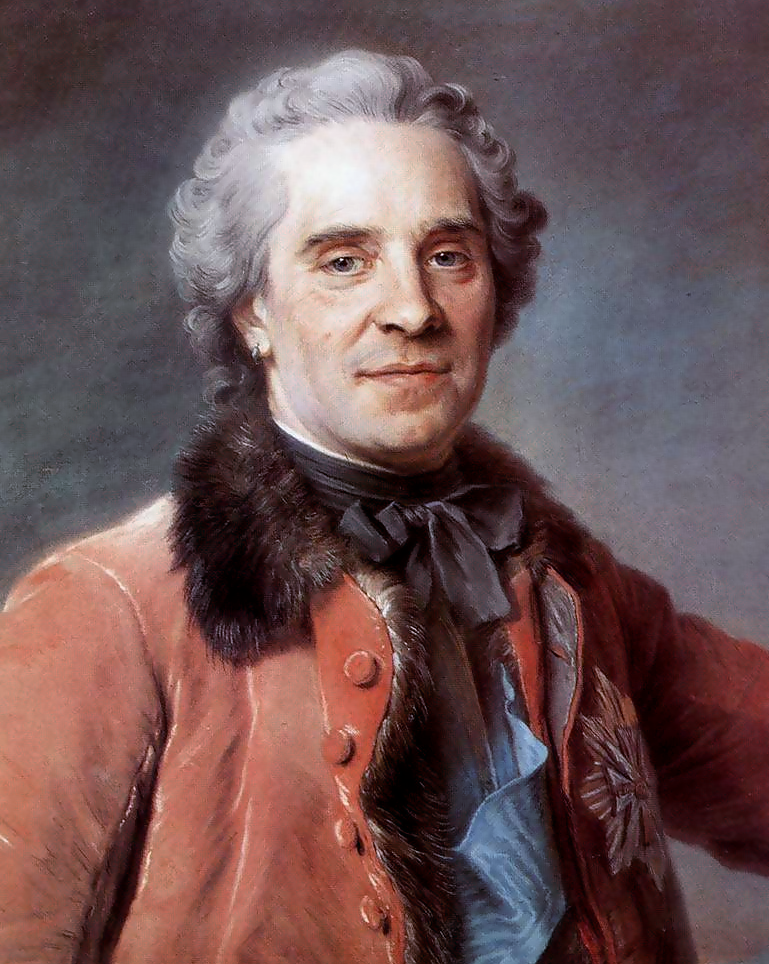
Maurice de Saxe

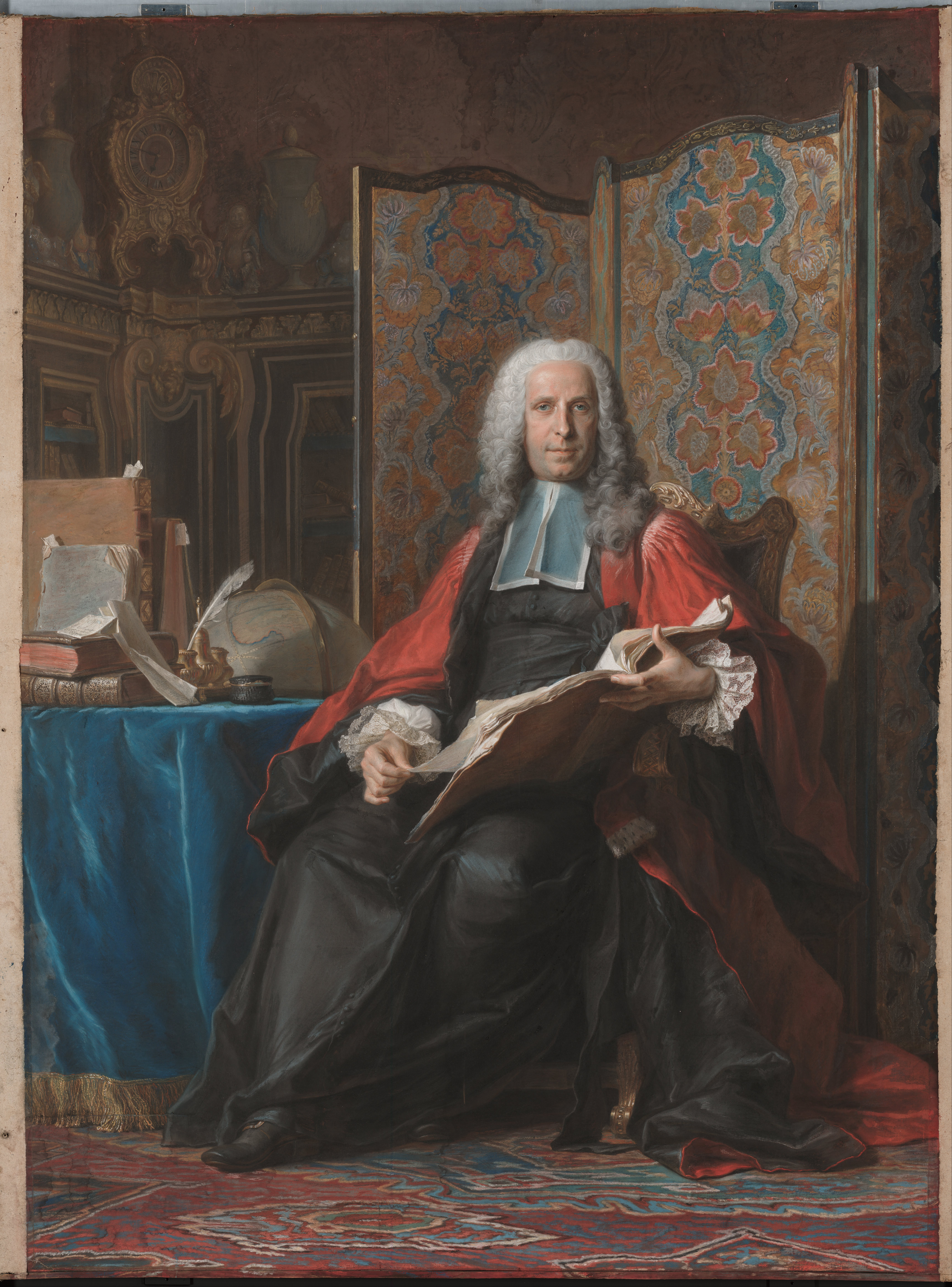
Portrait of Gabriel Bernard de Rieux

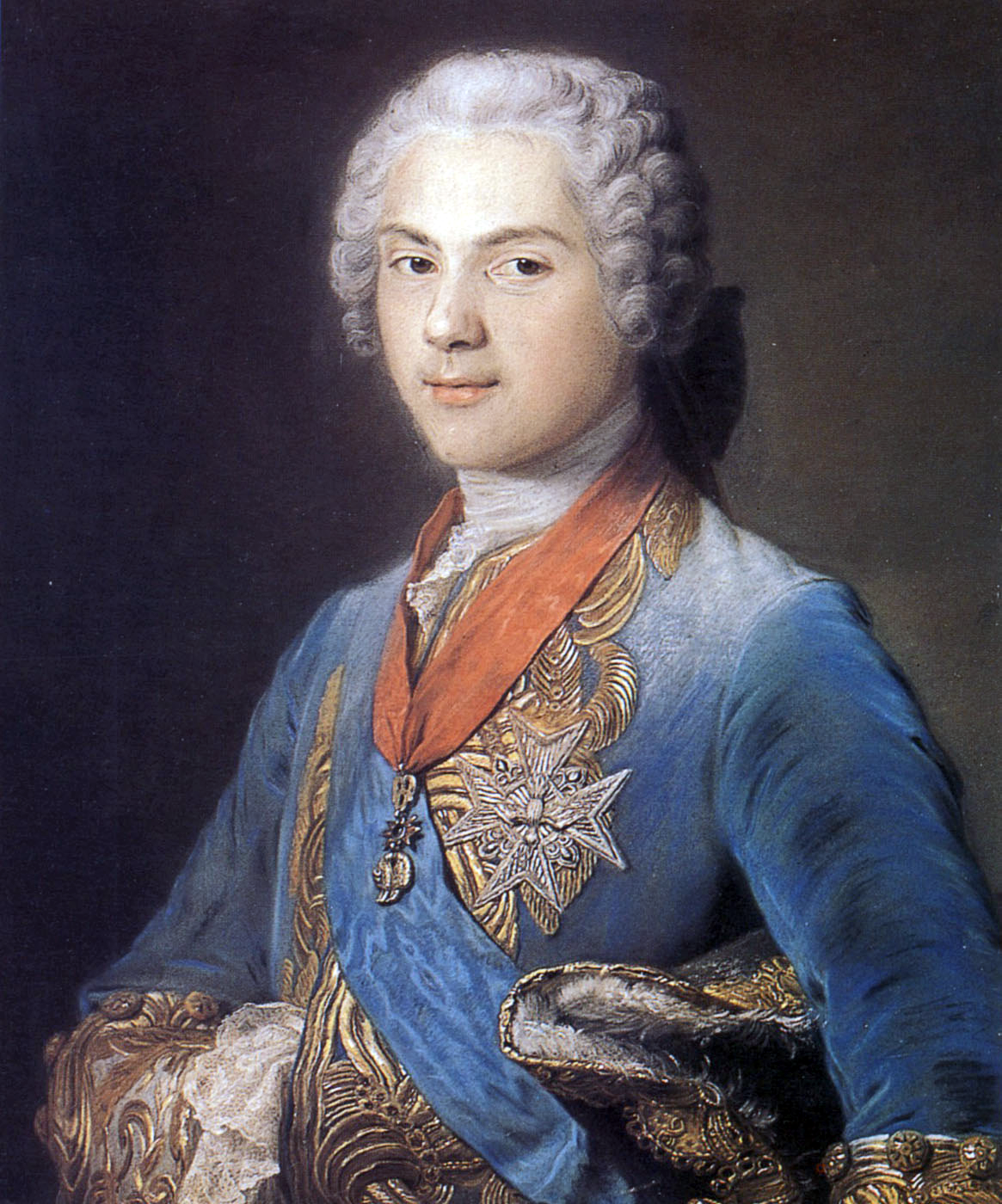
Louis de France, dauphin (1745)

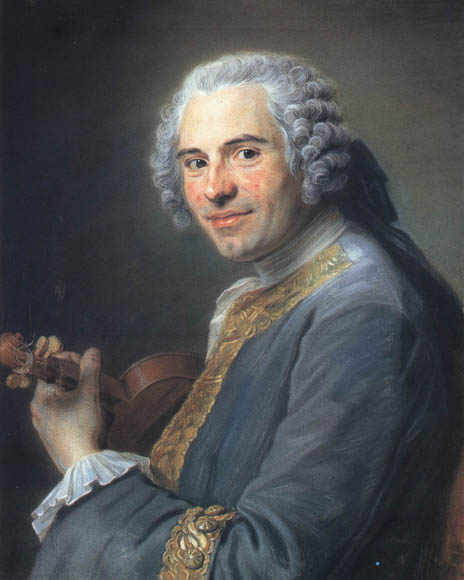
Jean-Joseph Cassanéa de Mondonville

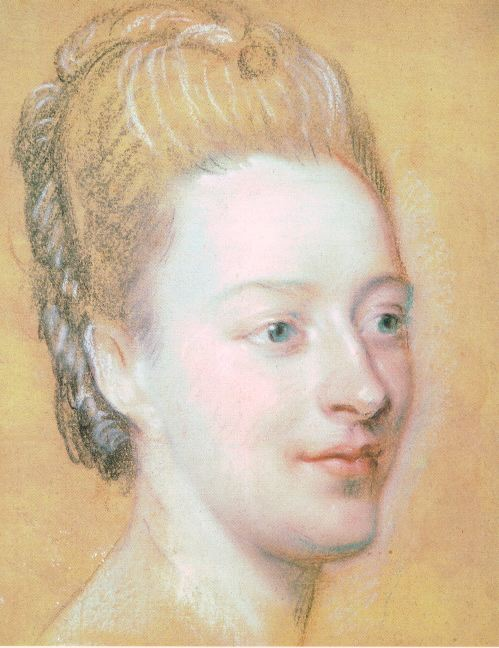
Isabelle de Charrière (1771)

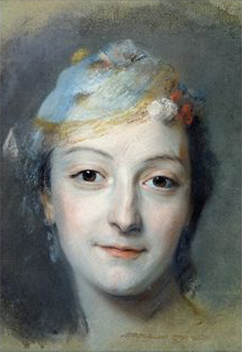
Marie Fel

== Commemoration ==
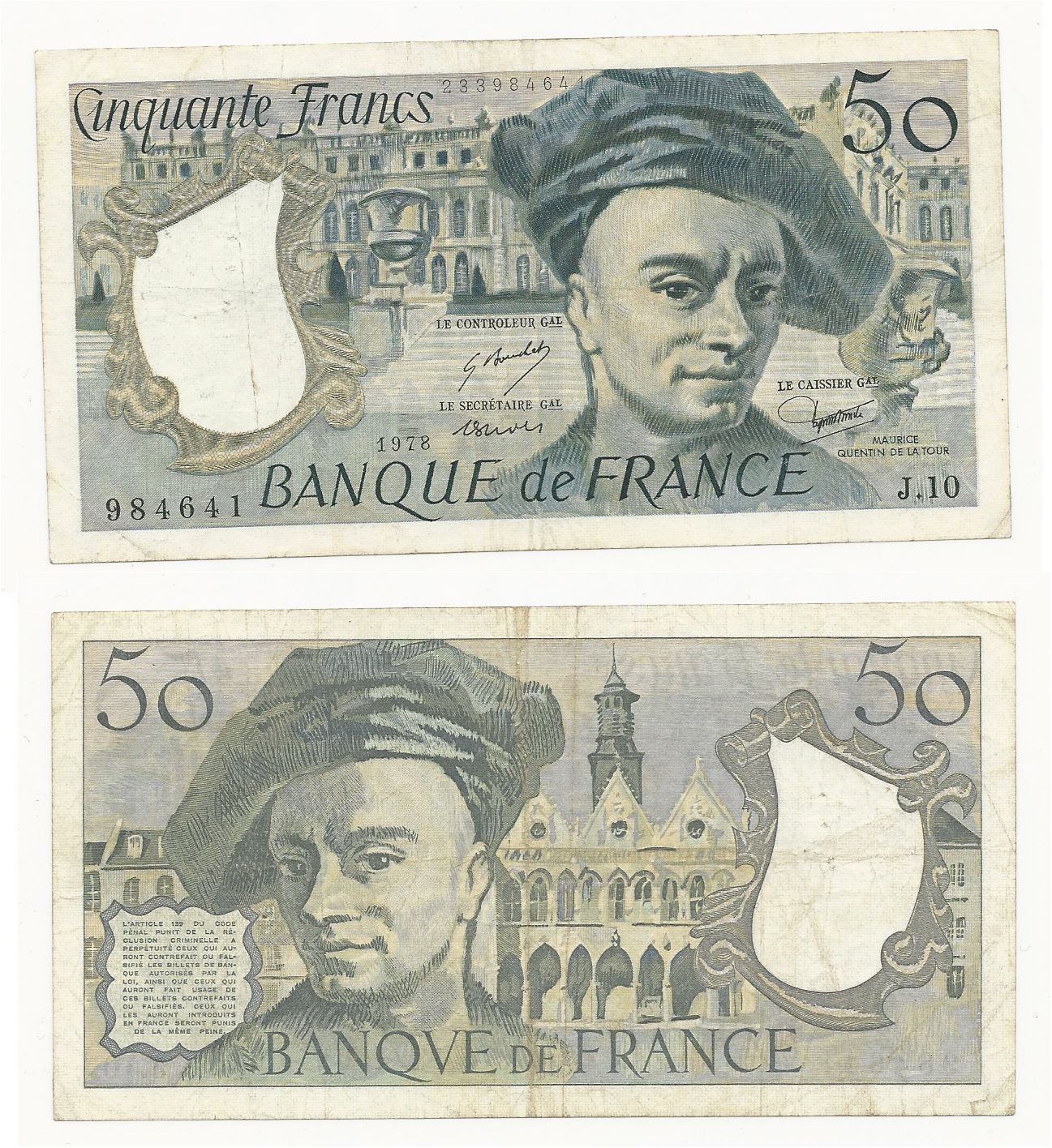
Maurice Quentin de La Tour on a banknote of 50 francs issued by the Bank of France in 1978

French banknotes denominated at 50 francs, issued from 1976 to 1992, featured de La Tour's portrait.

== Attribution ==
- .
- Monnier, Geneviève (2003). "La Tour [Delatour; Latour], Maurice-Quentin de". Grove Art Online.
