= Jeffares =

Jeffares is a surname. Notable people with the surname include:

- Brian Jeffares, New Zealand mayor
- Edward Jeffares (1917–1994), South African-born Irish cricketer
- Norman Jeffares (1920–2005), Irish literary scholar
- Rick Jeffares, American politician
- Shaun Jeffares, South African-born Irish cricketer
