= Élisabeth Ferrand =

French salon-holder and philosopher (1700–1752)

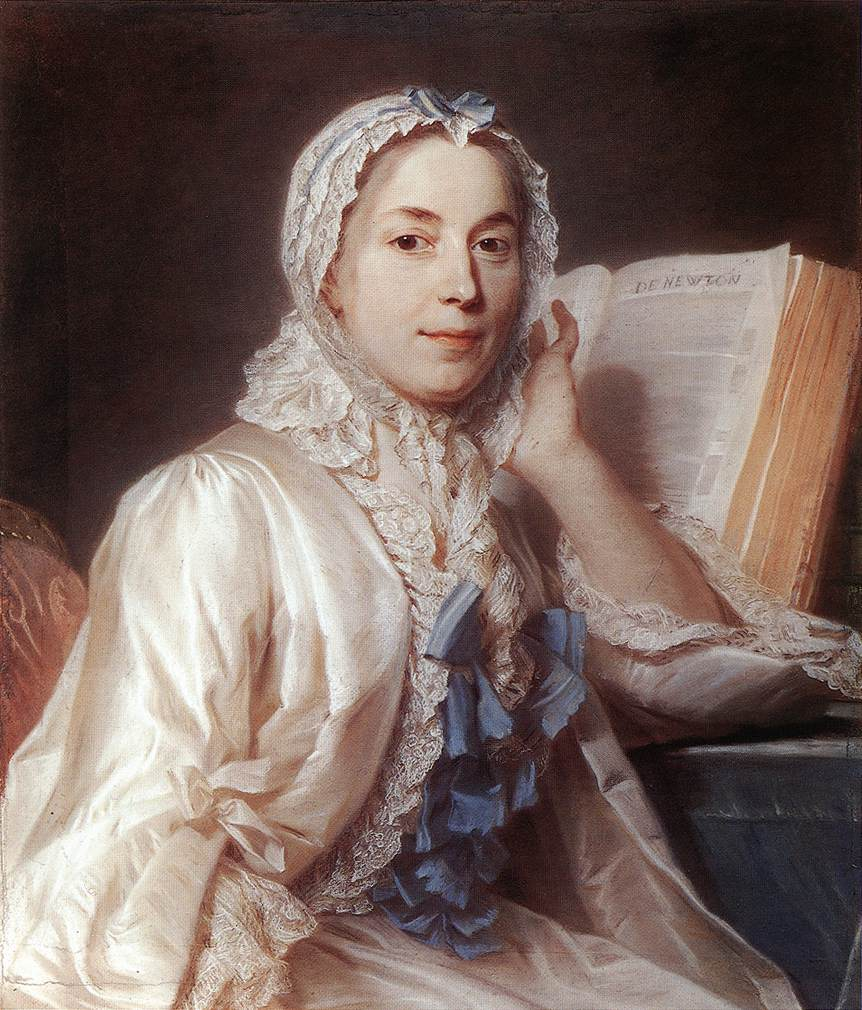
"Mlle Ferrand Meditating on Newton", by Maurice Quentin de La Tour

Élisabeth Ferrand (1700 – 3 September 1752) was a French salon-holder and philosopher.

A portrait of her by Maurice Quentin de La Tour with the title "Mlle Ferrand Meditating on Newton" is held in the Alte Pinakothek, Munich.

In 1749 Ferrand, along with her friends the Princesse de Talmont and the Comtesse de Vasse, helped Prince Charles Edward Stuart to hide in Paris, sheltering him in a convent and in their homes.
