= Théodore Basset de Jolimont =

French painter

François Gabriel Théodore Basset de Jolimont
- Born: 8 February 1787; Rouen, France
- Died: 27 October 1854 (aged 67); Dijon, France
- Occupations: Artist and author

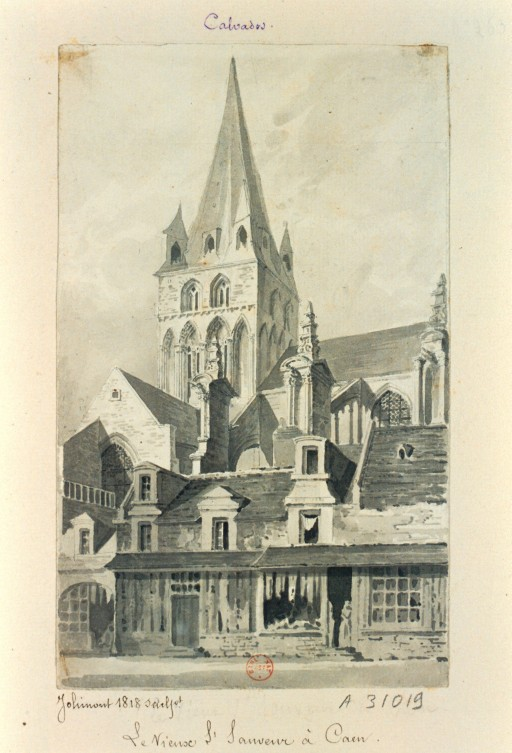
Tower of the old church, today called Vieux Saint-Sauveur, at the start of the 19th century. 1818

Henri IV exhumé/ Dédié au Roi by Eustache-Hyacinthe Langlois from a painting by Théodore Basset de Jolimont

François Gabriel Théodore Basset de Jolimont (8 February 1787 – 1854) was a French artist, lithographer, painter and antiquary.

== Biography ==
de Jolimont was born at Martainville, not far from Rouen, on 8 February 1787, son of an advocate at the Norman parliament. He became interested in drawing at an early age. When his father died the family fortune was swallowed up by legal fees, and he had to live by his work as an artist. de Joliment acquired considerable talent in painting with gouache and watercolor, and used this skill in reproducing and restoring ancient illustrated manuscripts. He became a writer on art, water-colorist and paleographer. He became director of the Gymnase central de Paris.

He had a love of the ancient monuments of France, which he wished to preserve for ever. He created a great number of illustrations of buildings in Paris, Rouen, Moulins and Dijon, and as both artist and author published a number of illustrated works on the monuments in different cities. King Louis-Philippe awarded him a gold medal for his 1845 book on the main buildings in Rouen of the year 1525. Despite his talent and the volume of his work, de Jolimont always struggled with poor fortune. He died in Dijon on 27 October 1854.

== Bibliography ==
- François-Gabriel-Théodore Basset de Jolimont (1821). Les mausolées français: recueil des tombeaux les plus remarquables par leur structure, leurs épitaphes ou les cendres qu'ils contiennent, érigés dans les nouveaux cimetières de Paris. Firmin-Didot.
- Jolimont, Théodore (1974). L' Allier pittoresque. Paris: Ed. du Palais royal.
- Théodore de Jolimont (1821). De la Nouvelle salle de l'Opéra. Vente. p. 16.
- Jolimont, Théodore (1822). Monumens les plus remarquables de la ville de Rouen : Recueillis, lithographiés et décrits. Paris: Leblanc.
- François-Gabriel-Théodore Basset de Jolimont (1824). Vues pittoresques de la cathédrale d'Amiens et détails remarquables de ce monument dessinés... et publiés par Chapuy,... avec un texte historique et descriptif. Leblanc. p. 17.
- François-Gabriel-Théodore Basset de Jolimont (1825). Vues pittoresques de la cathédrale d'Orléans et détails remarquables de ce monument dessinés par Chapuy,... avec un texte historique et descriptif. Engelmann. p. 16.
- Théodore de Jolimont (1825). Description historique et critique et vues des monuments religieux et civils les plus remarquables du département du Calvados bâtis dans les siècles du moyen âge et ceux de la Renaissance, jusqu'au règne de Louis XIV exclusivement. F. Didot. p. 71.
- François-Gabriel-Théodore Basset de Jolimont (1826). Vues pittoresques de la cathédrale de Reims et détails remarquables de ce monument dessinés par Chapuy,... avec un texte historique et descriptif, [et une Description des cérémonies du sacre du roi Charles X]. Engelmann.
- Théodore de Jolimont (1830). Description historique et critique et vues pittoresques... des monumens les plus remarquables de la ville de Dijon, par T. de Jolimont,... A. Barbier.
- François-Gabriel-Théodore Basset de Jolimont (1843). Polyanthea archéologique, ou Curiosités, raretés, bizarreries et singularités de l'histoire religieuse, civile, industrielle, artistique et littéraire, dans l'antiquité, le moyen âge et les temps modernes... impr. de P.-A. Desrosiers (et Place).

== Gallery ==
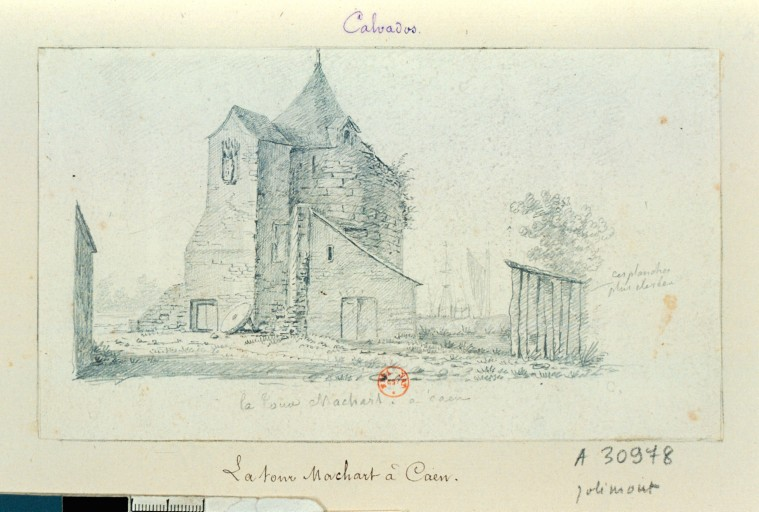
Tour Machart, Caen

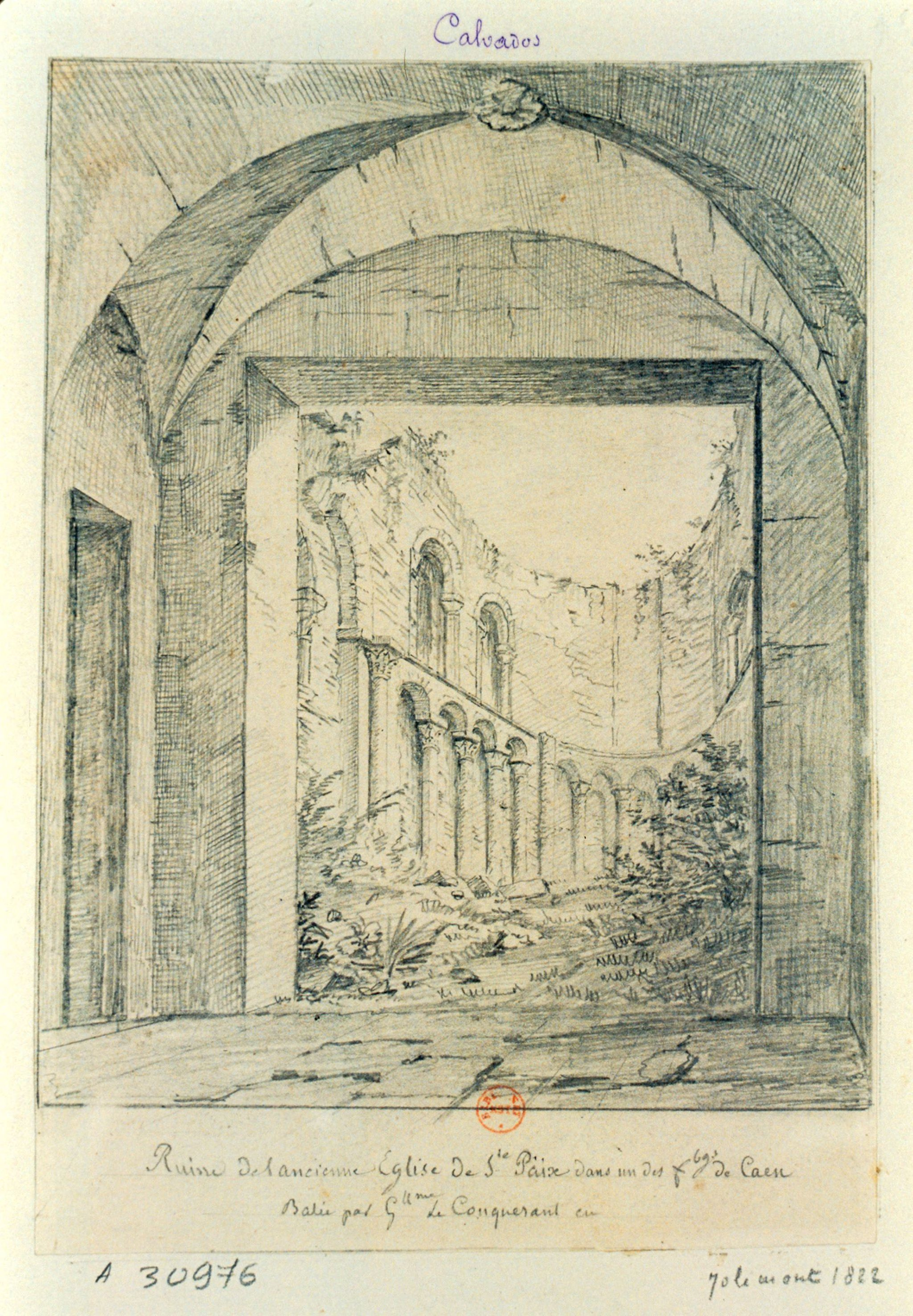
Chapelle Sainte-Paix in 1822

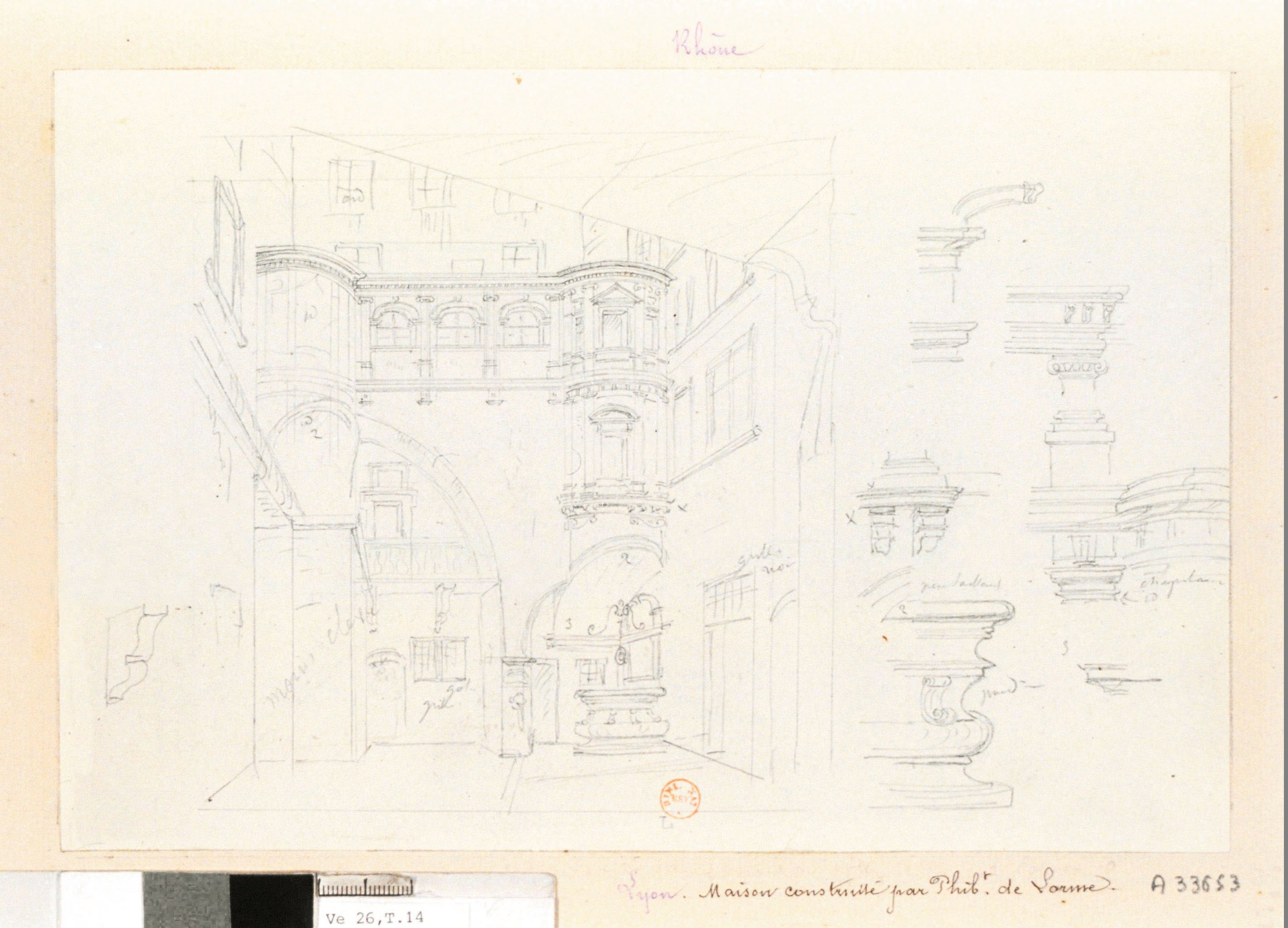
Galyery of the Hotel Bullioud, built by Philibert Delorme
