= Célestin Nanteuil =

French painter, engraver and illustrator (1813–1873)

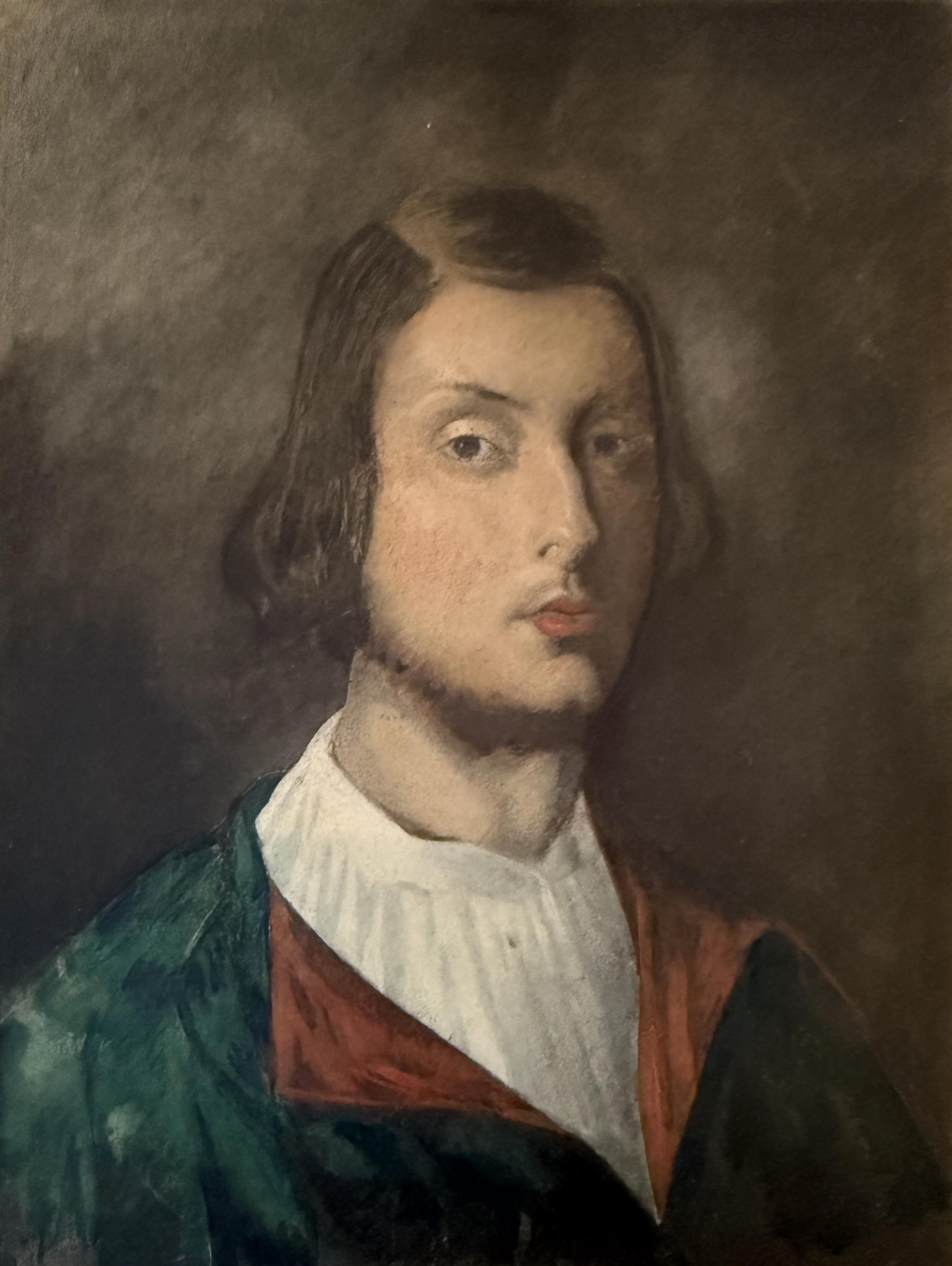
Célestin Nanteuil, self-portrait, pastel, 1830.

Célestin-François Nanteuil-Lebœuf, known as Célestin Nanteuil (French pronunciation: [selɛstɛ̃ nɑ̃tœj]; 11 July 1813 – 6 September 1873), was a French painter, engraver and illustrator closely tied to the Romantic movement in France. He was born in Rome to French parents who were part of Joseph Bonaparte's entourage. Nanteuil entered the École des Beaux-Arts in 1827, where he studied under Eustache-Hyacinthe Langlois, and then worked in the studio of Dominique Ingres. In 1848, he was made Director of Académie des beaux-arts and later became the curator of the Musée des beaux-arts in Dijon. He died in Bourron-Marlotte at the age of 60. His elder brother, Charles-François, was a noted sculptor who won the Prix de Rome in 1817.

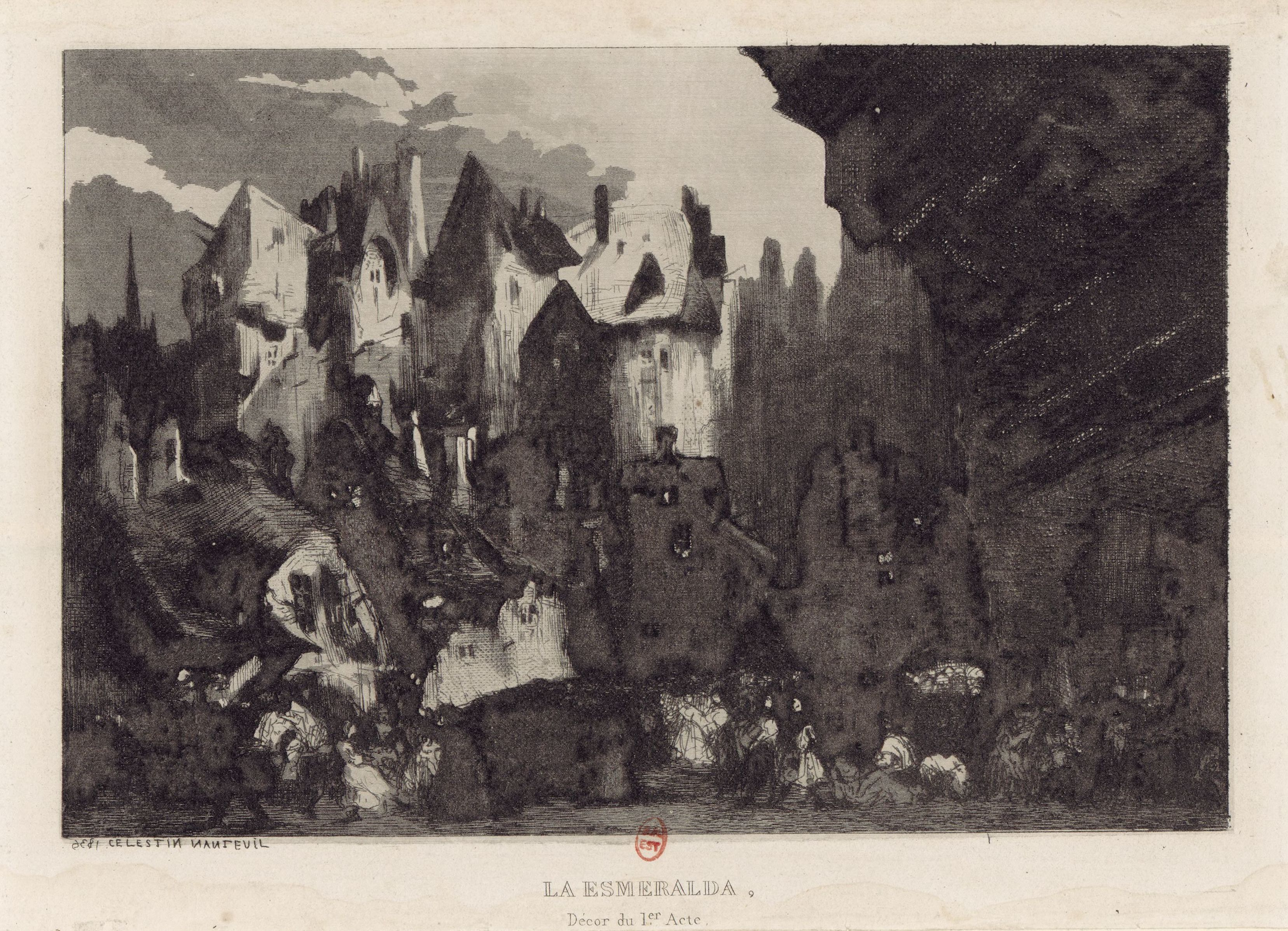
Engraving of the set of Act I of La Esmeralda.
