= Stephen Langlois =

Stephen Langlois is a Chicago area chef and author (with Margaret Guthrie) of Prairie: Cuisine from the Heartland (1991). As chef of Prairie restaurant in Chicago, Langlois was a pioneer in the local food movement.

Langlois was an innovative chef who defined American Midwestern cuisine in the 20th century. As chef of the now-closed Prairie from 1986 to 1997, Langlois showcased strictly Heartland regional fare, even steering clear of ocean fish. As Alice Waters delineated California cuisine, so Langlois highlighted foodstuffs of the Midwest, such as Iowa pheasant, Lake Superior whitefish and Sheboygan sausage.

The food at Prairie, Langlois said, was inspired by the Frank Lloyd Wright Prairie School architecture of the restaurant, which was located in Chicago's historic Printers Row neighborhood.

Langlois is currently executive chef of the Hyatt Lodge in Oak Brook, Illinois, a facility owned by McDonald's Corp. and which caters mostly to the staff and executives from its corporate headquarters.

A graduate of the hospitality program at Triton College in River Grove, Illinois and the Culinary Institute of America in Hyde Park, New York, Langlois also worked at the Chicago restaurants Cafe D'Artagnan and Maxim's and the Hotel Pulitzer in Amsterdam, Netherlands.

== See also ==
- Cuisine of the Midwestern United States
