= Shaun Jeffares =

South African-born Irish cricketer (1906–1997)

Personal information
- Full name: Alfred Shaun Jeffares
- Born: 14 August 1906; Komga, Cape Province, South Africa
- Died: 29 October 1997 (aged 91); Drinagh, Munster, Ireland
- Batting: Left-handed
- Bowling: Right-arm medium
- Relatives: Edward Jeffares (brother)

Domestic team information
- Years: Team
- 1926: Dublin University

Career statistics
Competition	First-class
Matches	1
Runs scored	15
Batting average	7.50
100s/50s	–/–
Top score	13
Balls bowled	162
Wickets	2
Bowling average	36.00
5 wickets in innings	–
10 wickets in match	–
Best bowling	2/72
Catches/stumpings	–/–
- Source: Cricinfo, 3 January 2022

Alfred Shaun Jeffares usually known as Shaun Jeffares (14 August 1906 in Cape Colony – 29 October 1997 in County Wexford, Ireland) was a South African-born Irish cricketer. A left-handed batsman and right-arm medium pace bowler, he played on first-class cricket match for Dublin University against Northamptonshire in July 1926, a match that also featured the Irish playwright Samuel Beckett. His brother Edward played cricket in India.
