= Edward Jeffares =

South African-born Irish cricketer

Edward William Derek Jeffares (24 May 1917 in Grahamstown, Cape Province, South Africa – 14 October 1994 in Stratford-on-Slaney, County Wicklow, Ireland) was a South African-born Irish cricketer. A right-handed batsman, he played one first-class cricket match for Madras against Bombay in the quarter-final of the Ranji Trophy in February 1949. His brother Shaun played cricket in Ireland.
