= Espérance Langlois =

French painter and printmaker (1805–1864)

- Born: 19 October 1805; Pont de l'Arche
- Died: 4 December 1864 (aged 59); Sèvres
- Occupations: Painter and printmaker
- Known for: Faust et Marguerite. Salon of 1839

Louise Marguerite Espérance Langlois (French pronunciation: [lwiz maʁɡəʁit ɛspeʁɑ̃s lɑ̃ɡlwa]; 19 October 1805 – 4 December 1864) was a French painter and printmaker. From her marriage to the lawyer and businessman Jean-Adrien Bourlet de la Vallée she was also known as Espérance Bourlet de la Vallée.

== Life ==
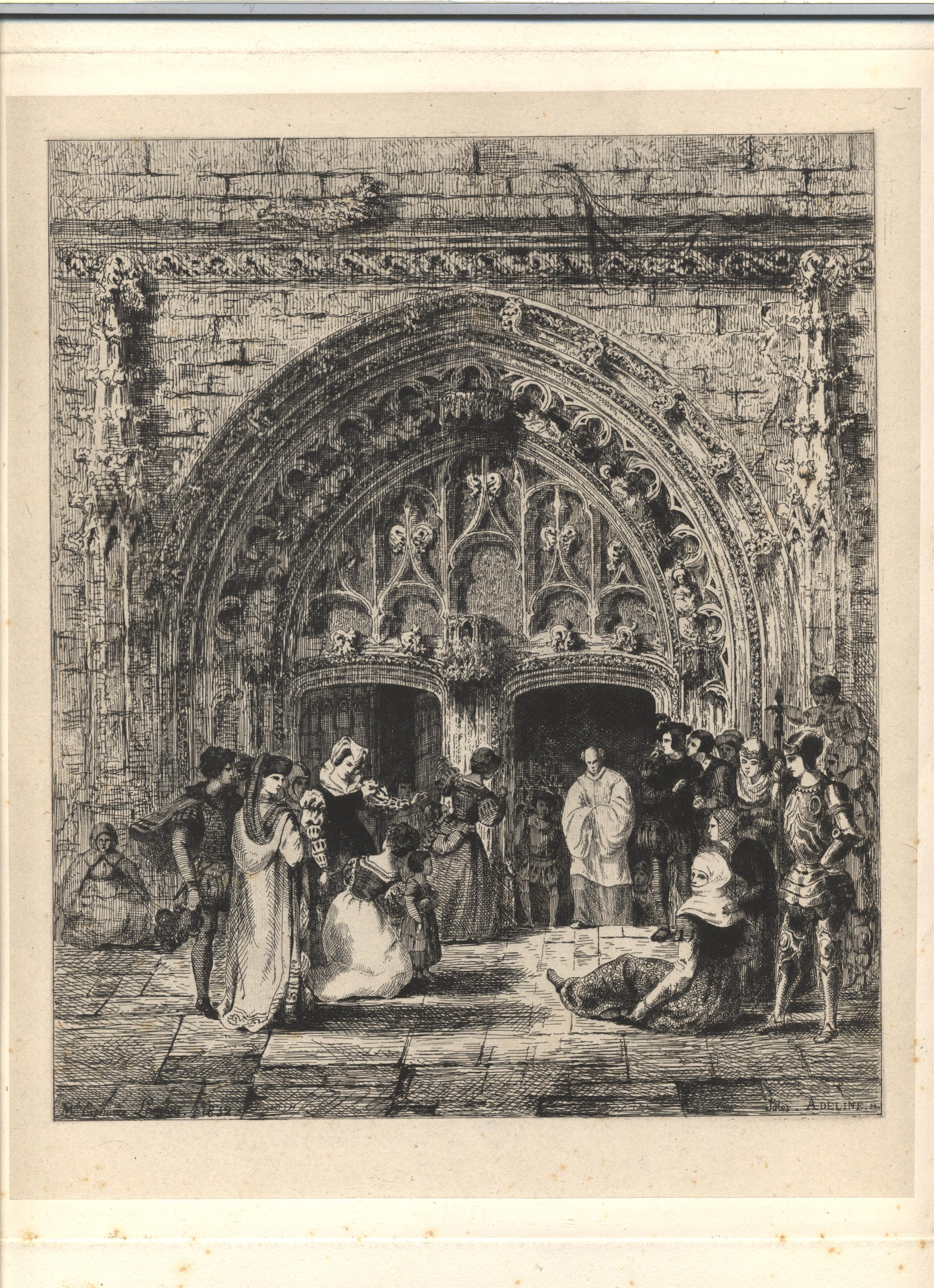
Door of the old church of Bonsecours

Espérance Langlois was born on 19 October 1805 at Pont-de-l'Arche in Normandy. Her grandfather had been an adviser to the king of France. Her father was the artist and antiquarian Eustache-Hyacinthe Langlois. Throughout her childhood the family lived in great poverty, first in Pont-de-l'Arche and after 1816 in Rouen, while her father struggled to live by selling his work. These included drawings of old architecture and gothic-style illustrations of legends. Both Espérance and her brother Polyclès Langlois were taught by their father and often assisted him with drawings and engravings.

Espérance Langlois married Jean-Adrien Bourlet de la Vallée. Their son Alexandre Bourlet de la Vallée was a classmate of Gustave Flaubert. In 1834 the Rouen Academy of Fine Arts awarded her a silver medal in the category "Genre works". Espérance was later employed for several years as a painter by the Sèvres porcelain factory. The porcelain work she made there was shown at many exhibitions of industrial art in France and England. She died on 4 December 1864 at Sèvres.

== Work ==
Espérance Langlois published seven engraved plates in an 1832 book written by her father about ancient and modern paintings on glass. A book reviewer said of these engravings, "The beautiful and curious windows of the churches of St. Godard, the Cathedral, St. Ouen, St. Patrice, and St. Vincent in Rouen have been copied by Madamoiselle Langlois with great spirit, skill and faithfulness." Another praised the beauty and exactitude of the drawings. Three plates drawn and engraved by Esperance appeared in an 1833 Histoire du Privilege de Saint-Romain.

Her illustrations in her father's book Stalles de la cathédrale de Rouen, published in 1838, are the main source for the appearance of the choir stalls and misericords that were destroyed when Rouen Cathedral was bombed during World War II. Some of her engravings appeared in another book by her father on the dance of the dead, published in 1852. Other works that have been attributed to her include engravings of historical, archaeological and religious topics and oil paintings of scenery and portraits.

== Selected works ==
- Vue intérieure du cloître de Saint-Wandrille. Drawing
- Le Partage ou Enfants sur les quais de Paris. Oil on canvas, 46 × 55 cm (also attributed to Eugène Langlois (Note: Eugène Langlois (born 1824) was the son of a porter in Paris who was employed as a porcelain painter in his youth. Later he became a civil servant. He is best known as a poet and songwriter.)).
- Procession en Normandie. Oil on canvas, 21 × 27 cm.
- Portrait de dame. Oil on canvas, 33 × 41 cm (attributed).
- Vitrail de Saint Julien de la cathédrale de Rouen. Engraving (1832).
- Cérémonie de la levée de la Fierté. Engraving (1833).
- Mausolée du cardinal d'Amboise, dans la cathédrale de Rouen. Engraving with gouache highlights
- 1836 Tete de vieille femme de Normandie
- 1836 Portrait de M.B. de la V., advocate at the royal court of Rouen
- 1839 Faust et Marguerite
- 1853 Portrait de Rembrandt; porcelain

== Sources ==
- Académie royale de Belgique (1865). "Necrologie - Madame Bourlet de le Vallee". Journal des beaux-arts et de la littérature, peinture, sculpture, gravure, architecture, musique, archéologie, bibliographie, belles-lettres (in French). Vol. 7–8. Decq.
- "Eugène Langlois - Past Auction Results". Artnet.
- "Espérance Langlois - Past Auction Results". Artnet.
- Block, Élaine C.; Billiet, Frédéric; Bethmont-Gallerand, Sylvie (2003). Les stalles de la cathédrale de Rouen: Histoire et iconographie (in French). Publication Univ Rouen Havre. ISBN 2877753514.
- de la Chavignerie, Emile Bellier; Auvray, Louis (1882). Dictionnaire général des artistes de l'école française depuis l'origine des arts du dessin jusqu'à nos jours: architectes, peintres, sculpteurs, graveurs et lithographes (in French). Vol. 1. Renouard.
- Dubosc, Georges (2003). Turquant: le chant des bates en bord de Loire (in French). Editions Cheminements. ISBN 2844781934.
- Imbert, Eugene (1888). "Un Chansonnier: Eugene Langlois". La Revue du siècle, littéraire, artistique & scientifique (in French). Vol. 2.
- Langlois, Eustache-Hyacinthe (1832). Essai historique et descriptif sur la peinture sur verre ancienne et moderne et sur les vitraux les plus remarquables de quelques monuments français et étrangers, suivi de la biographie des plus célèbres peintres-verriers (in French). Reprinted by Bertout, Luneray, 1987. Frères. ISBN 286-743-055-0.
- Langlois, Eustache-Hyacinthe (1838). Stalles de la cathédrale de Rouen (in French). N. Périaux. p. 43.
- Langlois, Eustache-Hyacinthe (1852). Essai historique, philosophique et pittoresque sur les danses des morts (in French). Illustrated with 54 plates designed and engraved by Eustache-Hyacinthe Langlois, Espérance Langlois, Brévière and Tudot. Rouen: A. Lebrument.
- Michaud, Louis Gabriel (1859). Biographie universelle ancienne et moderne: ou histoire, par ordre alphabétique, de la vie publique et privée de tous les hommes qui se sont fait remarquer par leurs écrits, leurs talents, leurs vertus ou leurs crimes. La - Leh (in French). Vol. 23. Desplaces.
- "On the Art of Glass-Painting". London and Edinburgh philosophical magazine and journal of science. Richard and John E. Taylor. 1836. p. 456.
- Oursel, Noémi Noire (1886). Nouvelle biographie normande (in French). Vol. 1. A. Picard.
- Pollen, John Hungerford, ed. (1870). Universal catalogue of books on art, Volume 2. B. Franklin.
- Revue anglo-française (in French). Vol. 1–2. 1834.
- Revue de Rouen et de Normandie, Volumes 5-6 (in French). Au bureau de la Revue de Rouen. 1835.
