= Eustache-Hyacinthe Langlois =

French painter

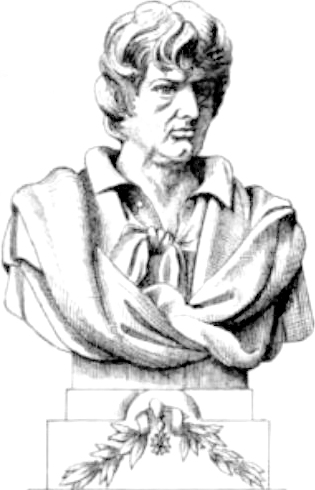
- Monument of Eustache-Hyacinthe Langlois in his native town of Pont-de-l'Arche
- Born: 3 August 1777; Pont-de-l'Arche, France
- Died: 29 September 1837 (aged 60); Rouen, France
- Occupations: Artist and author

Eustache-Hyacinthe Langlois (French pronunciation: [østaʃjasɛ̃t(ə) lɑ̃ɡlwa]; 3 August 1777 – 29 September 1837) was a French painter, draftsman, engraver and writer. He became known as the "Norman Callot". He taught both his daughter Espérance Langlois and his son Polyclès Langlois and they often assisted him with drawings and engravings.

== Biography ==
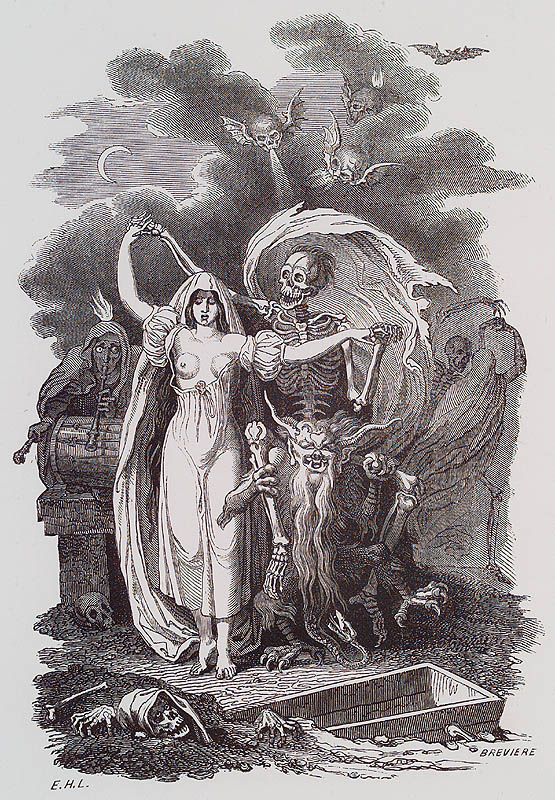
Seductive death by Langlois

Henri IV exhumé/ Dédié au Roi by Langlois from a painting by François Gabriel Théodore Basset de Jolimont

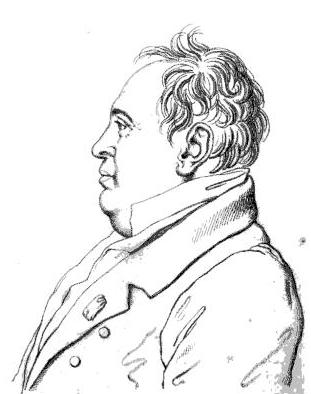
Sketch of Jean-Antoine Alavoine, architect, an old friend of Langlois

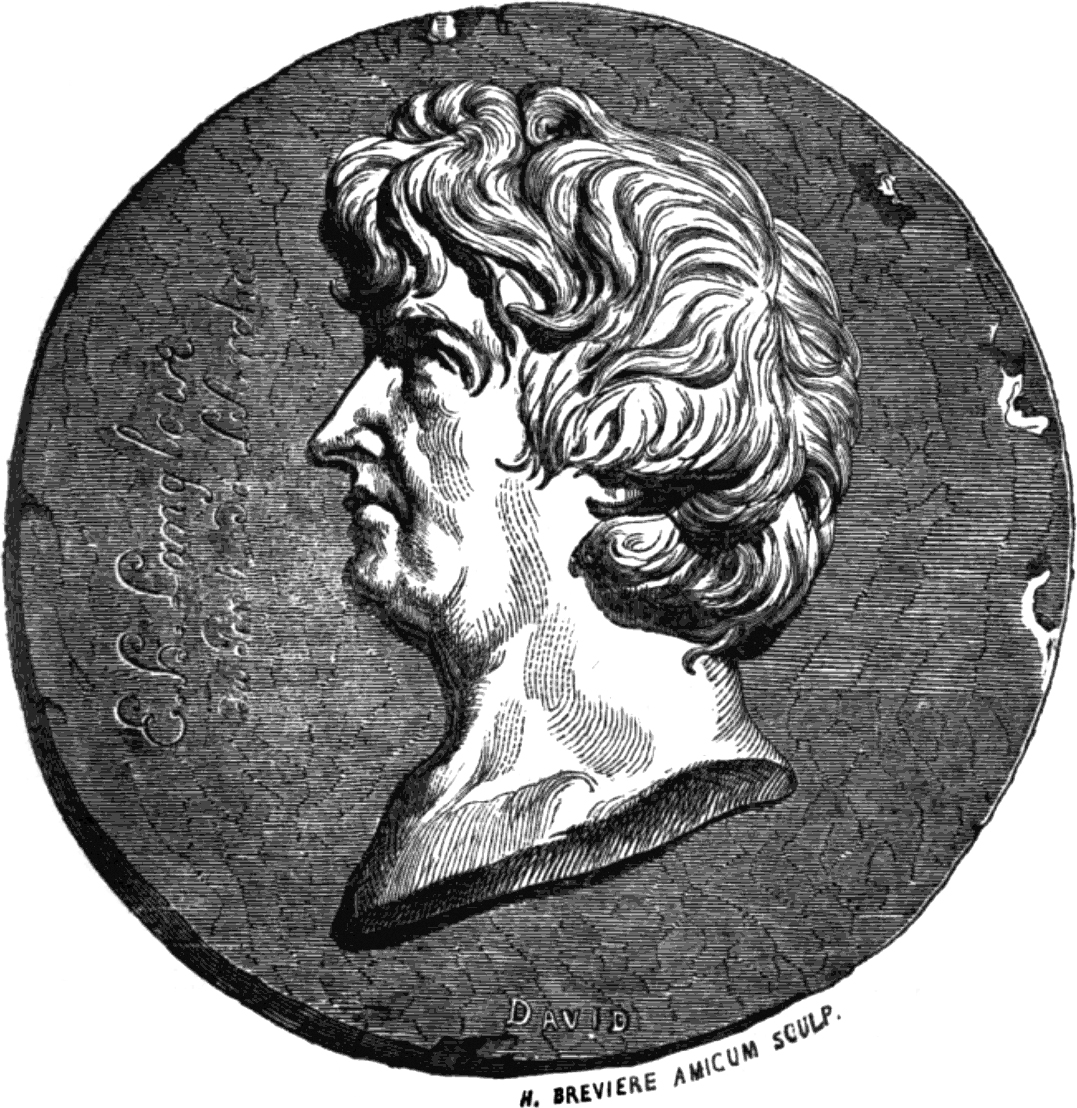
Engraving by Louis-Henri Brévière of his friend Eustache-Hyacinthe Langlois

Eustache-Hyacinthe Langlois was born at Pont de l'Arche in Normandy on 3 August 1777. His father, André-Girard Langlois, was an advisor to the king and Master of Forestry. Although he showed early interest in art, Eustache-Hyacinthe seemed destined for a career in the administration. However, the French Revolution broke out on 1789 and his father was forced to emigrate to escape lawsuits. Langlois was imprisoned, but was released through the intervention of Jacques-Charles Dupont de l'Eure. In 1793 he began to study art at the École de Mars in Paris under the painter Jacques-Louis David. In 1794 he was conscripted into the army, but managed to obtain his freedom with the help of friends and received his final discharge from Napoleon's wife Joséphine de Beauharnais. In 1798 he became a pupil of Anicet Charles Gabriel Lemonnier, but there was friction between master and pupil and he returned to David.

In 1806 Langlois was forced to return to his place of birth, Pont-de-l'Arche, living there in obscurity for the next ten years. In 1816 he moved to Rouen, a large city by the standards of the time, where he hoped to find work as an artist to support his wife and seven children. At first they had very little money and lived in a slum room in extreme poverty. Surrounded by buildings and ruins from the Middle Ages, Langlois became a prolific creator of drawings in the gothic style, depicting the supernatural world of devils and sorcerers based on ancient legends and embellished by his imagination. He managed to scrape a living from sale of these works.

Langlois devoted himself to the study and preservation of his Norman heritage, and gradually became well known for his writings and illustrations on historical subjects. He was actively involved in almost all publications in Rouen. In 1824 he was named a member of the Rouen Academy, and began teaching art to young students. By 1825 he was a member of the Society of Antiquaries of Normandy, based in Caen, a member of the Royal Academy of Science, Belles-letters and Arts of Rouen and a correspondent of the Society of Agriculture, Science and Arts of the department of l'Eure.

In 1827 the Duchess of Berry visited Rouen and he was assigned to act as her guide to the monuments of the city. The princess was impressed by his knowledge and spirit. Through her influence, the next year he obtained the position of professor of drawing at Rouen's municipal school of art. His pupils included Célestin Nanteuil, Frédéric Legrip and Gustave Flaubert. In 1830 he became a member of the Society of Antiquaries of Scotland, and in 1833 was appointed president of the Société d’émulation de Rouen. He was appointed a Chevalier of the Legion of Honour in 1835. In 1837 he became head of the Rouen museum of antiquities. He died on 29 September 1837 at the age of 60.

== Legacy ==
Langlois's drawings of the church of St. Herbland are all that remain of this ancient building, since destroyed. His book Stalles de la cathédrale de Rouen published in 1838 included drawings of all the misericords in the choir stalls of Rouen Cathedral in the 19th century. In the bombardment of the cathedral in April and June 1944 during World War II some of the stalls and misericords were destroyed and others badly damaged. Langlois's book, illustrated by drawings made by his daughter, provides the main source of information on the destroyed stalls and misericords. Unfortunately the drawings do not show all the details. However, they do provide an accurate view of the way the misericords were arranged in the 19th century.

== Character ==
During a period of hardship Langlois made a sketch of a piece of furniture for a manufacturer who promised to pay 500 francs for a detailed drawing. After much effort Langlois presented the finished work, but the manufacturer now offered just 300 francs. Langlois tossed the drawing into the fire and walked out, his pride intact and his pocket empty. His experiences during the revolution and subsequent Napoleonic Wars, which continued until 1815, reinforced Langlois' Christian and anti-revolutionary beliefs, and these are evident in his work. According to Édouard Frère "he was well-named the 'Callot Normand', a title justified by the fecundity of his spiritual compositions and the dignity of his character". (Note: The nickname "Callot Normand" refers to Jacques Callot (1592–1635), a prolific printmaker and draftsman from the Duchy of Lorraine)

== Bibliography ==
- Eustache-Hyacinthe Langlois (1823). Notice sur l'incendie de la Cathédrale de Rouen: occasionné par la foudre, le 15 septembre 1822, et sur l'histoire monumentale de cette église : ornée de six plances. Chez Renault ..., Frère ... et chez l'auteur. p. 180.
- Langlois, Eustache-Hyacinthe (1827). Essai historique et descriptif sur l'abbaye de Fontenelle ou de Saint Wandrille et sur plusieurs autres monuments des environs. impr. de J. Tastu. p. 193.
- Wace, Auguste Le Prévost; Eustache-Hyacinthe Langlois (1827). Frédéric Pluquet (ed.). Le Roman de Rou et des ducs de Normandie. Vol. 2. E. Frère.
- Langlois, Eustache-Hyacinthe (1832). Essai historique et descriptif sur la peinture sur verre ancienne et moderne et sur les vitraux les plus remarquables de quelques monuments français et étrangers, suivi de la biographie des plus célèbres peintres-verriers. Frères. p. 302.
- Eustache-Hyacinthe Langlois (1838). Stalles de la cathédrale de Rouen. N. Périaux. p. 221.
- Eustache-Hyacinthe Langlois (1838). Achille Deville; Achille Jubinal (eds.). Essai sur les Énervés de Jumiéges et sur quelques décorations singulières des églises de cette abbaye: suivi du miracle de sainte Bautheuch. Édouard Frère. pp. 239.
- Eustache-Hyacinthe Langlois (1841). Essai sur la calligraphie des manuscrits du moyen-âge et sur les ornements des premiers Livres d'heures imprimés. I. S. Lefevre. pp. 180.
- Eustache-Hyacinthe Langlois; Constant Leber; André Ariodant Pottier; Georges-Bernard Depping; Alfred Baudry (1852). Essai historique: philosophique et pittoresque sur les Danses des morts. Vol. 1. A.Lebrument.

== Selected works ==
The following works are held in museums in France:

| Title | Medium | Location | Notes |
|---|---|---|---|
| Henri IV exhumed / Dedicated to the king | Engraving | Château de Pau | Drawn from a painting by Théodore Basset de Jolimont |
| View of Rouen | Drawing | Musée des Beaux-Arts d'Angers | Q2 19th century |
| Page of studies | Drawing | Évreux Musée de l'Ancien Evêché | Q2 19th century |
| Tomb of Dagobert | Drawing | Musée du Louvre | 19th century |
| Three groups of studies | Drawing | Évreux Musée de l'Ancien Evêché | 19th century |
| Head of François I | Engraving | Musée du Louvre | 19th century |
| Portrait of Mmm Theodore Lebreton | Painting | Unknown | Possibly by Jean Charles Langlois |
| The 101 kings and queens of France: Henri IV | Engraving | Château de Pau | Q2 19th century |
