= Polyclès Langlois =

French painter (1814–1872)

- Born: 29 September 1814; Pont de l'Arche
- Died: 30 November 1872 (aged 58); Sèvres
- Occupations: Writer, cartoonist and painter

Polyclès Langlois (29 September 1814 – 30 November 1872) was a French writer, draughtsman and painter.

== Biography ==
Polyclès Langlois was born in Pont de l'Arche in Normandy on 29 September 1814. He was the son of Eustache-Hyacinthe Langlois. Polyclès and his older sister Espérance Langlois were both taught by their father and often assisted him with drawings and engravings. He exhibited a view of Saint-Ouen and Old Street of old Rouen at the Salon de Paris of 1861. He drew views of the monuments of Rouen and then worked at the Sèvres porcelain factory. He died in Sèvres on 30 November 1872.

== Selected works ==
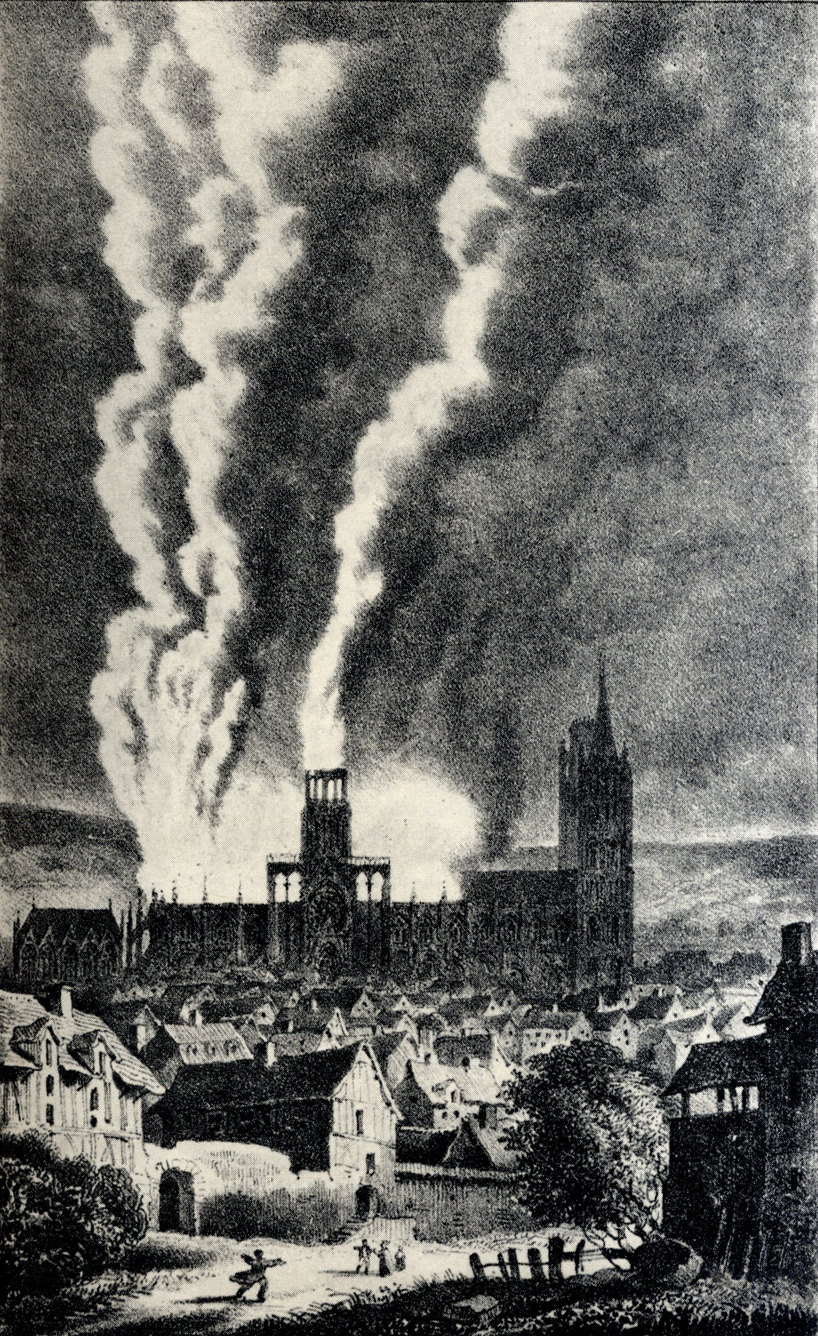
Incendie de la flèche

- Fontaine de la Croix de Pierre de Rouen. Eau-forte;
- Samuël Bochart, né à Rouen, 1835;
- Figures dehors un château dans un paysage vert, huile sur toile, 26×21 cm;
- Château d'Hautot à M. le baron Lézurier de La Martel, Hautot-sur-Seine, dessin au crayon noir;
- Vielle tour normande, aquarelle sur papier, 18×13 cm, 1842;
- Rouen, le pont suspendu, aquarelle sur papier, 28×43 cm;
- Aux portes de la ville, gouache on paper, 1850;
- Église de Caudebec (pays de Caux), dessin, 1845;
- La Grosse Horloge;
- Saint-Amand;
- Porche de l’église de Louviers;
- Tour de l’horloge;
- Quatre vues de Rouen et de Basse-Normandie, aquarelles;
- Souvenir de Rouen, dessin au crayon noir;
- Maison de la rue Impériale à Rouen, dessin à la mine de plomb;
- Marché de la Basse-Vieille-Tour, à Rouen, dessin à la mine de plomb
- Vue de l’église Saint-Ouen, à Rouen, dessin au crayon noir;
- Composition, dessin an crayon noir;
- Maisons de Rouen, dessin à la mine de plomb.
- L'Abbatiale Saint-Ouen de Rouen vue depuis les ponts du Robec
- Rouen, vue du quai de Paris, la cathédrale à l'arrière-plan, 1838

== Gallery ==
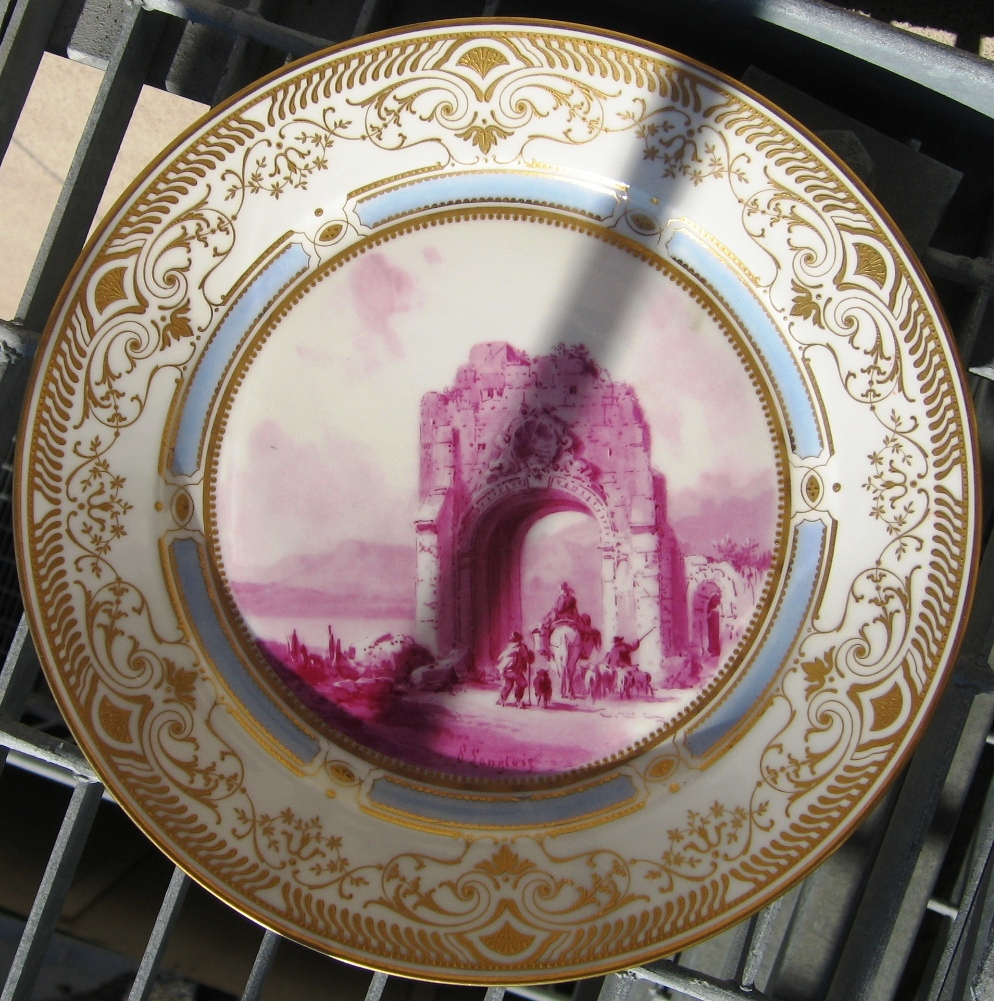
Sèvres plate 1863 (24 cm) Painted & signed by Polycles Langlois

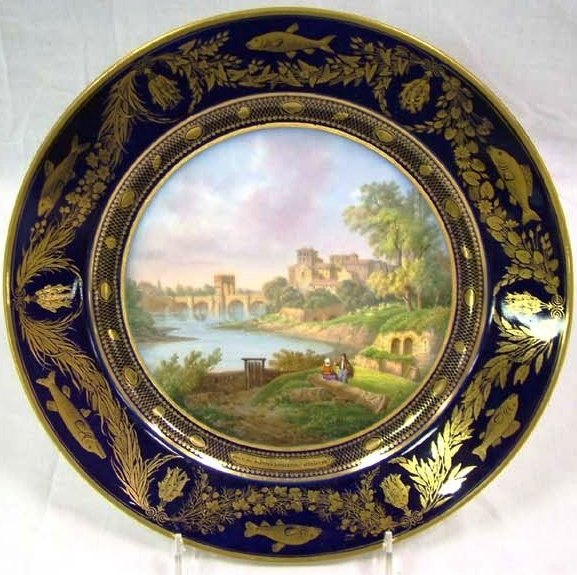
Sèvres plate ('service des fleuves et rivieres de France') Most of the set was originally sent to the French embassy in Istanbul (c 1847) Painted & signed by Polycles Langlois (9 5 in)
