= Villiers-le-Bel series =

French series of artworks by Childe Hassam

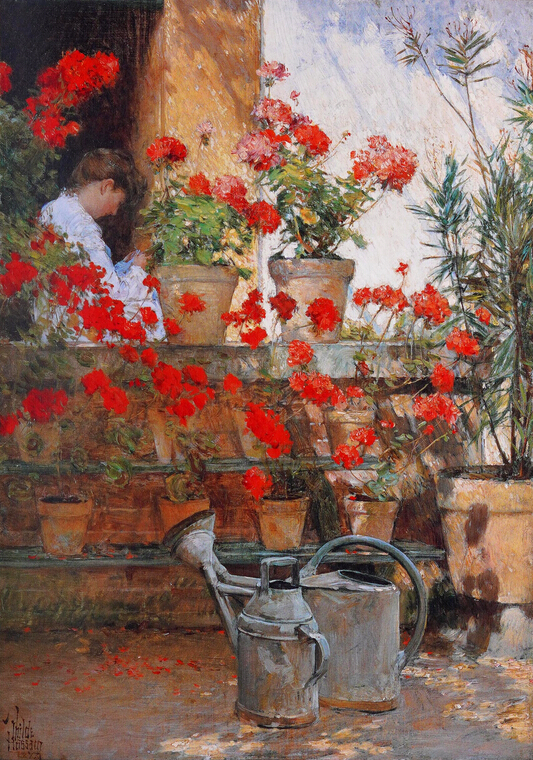
- Geraniums (1888–1889), Hyde Collection
- Housed at: Various
- Size (no. of items): ~24

The Villiers-le-Bel series is a group of garden paintings by American Impressionist painter Childe Hassam from his Paris period. The series depicts the gardens and environs of the former country estate of painter Thomas Couture at Villiers-le-Bel, in the Oise valley in northern France. Hassam produced the works over three summers from 1887 to 1889, while studying at the Académie Julian.

Paintings in the series, such as After Breakfast, appeared at the Exposition Universelle of 1889, while Geraniums (Hyde Collection, 1888), one of the most notable works in the series, was shown at the Salon of 1889. A decade later, Hassam returned to the series while on his third trip to Europe, producing In a French Garden (1897), which demonstrates his new, fully developed Impressionist style.

The group of paintings is regarded as his first coherent series to employ the garden motif, which matured in his Isles of Shoals series in the 1890s. One painting in the series, In the Sun (1888), was stolen from a private collection in 1976 and recovered in 2007 after being missing for 31 years. Many of the paintings have been exhibited separately. Most are held in private collections, with several available to view in museum collections.

== Background ==
=== Boston ===
Hassam produced several floral works while residing in Boston in the early to mid-1880s, with the still life Vase of Flowers (1885) an example of the theme. In his early period, he was making a good income as an illustrator and a watercolorist, but he wanted to pursue painting as a primary occupation. He began working in the style of tonalism, influenced in part by artists George Fuller and John Joseph Enneking. In the mid to late 19th century, American artists often trained in France, with younger artists attracted to the rise of Impressionism. Hassam followed in their footsteps, sailing to France to study at the Académie Julian for three years. His trip was financed by the continued sales of his works in Boston art galleries while he was away.

=== Paris ===
He and his wife Maud arrived in Paris in late 1886, just several months after the eighth and final Impressionist exhibition had closed. They moved into a studio in the Montmartre district at 11 Boulevard de Clichy, with Hassam attending drawing classes taught by Gustave Boulanger and Jules Lefebvre. When the Hassams arrived, the Paris district of Montmartre was becoming the center of the artists quarter, with bars, dance-halls, cabarets, and cafes. In their own building, Hassam's neighbors included Giovanni Boldini, Henri Pille, and Frank Boggs, while Paul Signac, Georges Seurat, Fernand Cormon, Anders Zorn, and Mary Cassatt were nearby.

The first major painting Hassam completed in Paris was Une Averse—rue Bonaparte (1887), (Note: Formerly known as Cab Station, Rue Bonaparte.) showing signs that his tonalist palette was beginning to change. It was exhibited at the Salon of 1887 and received good reviews.

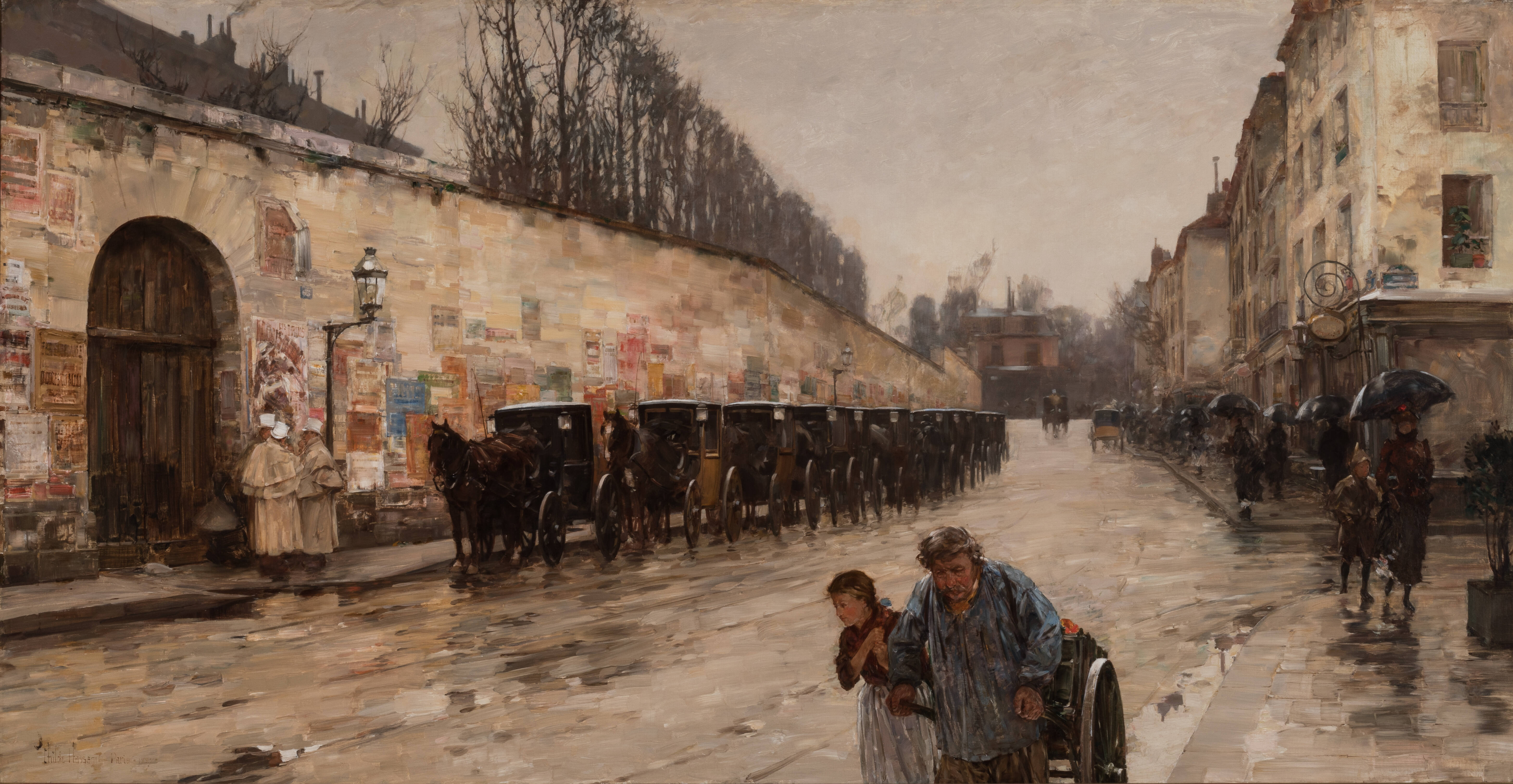
Une Averse—rue Bonaparte (1887)

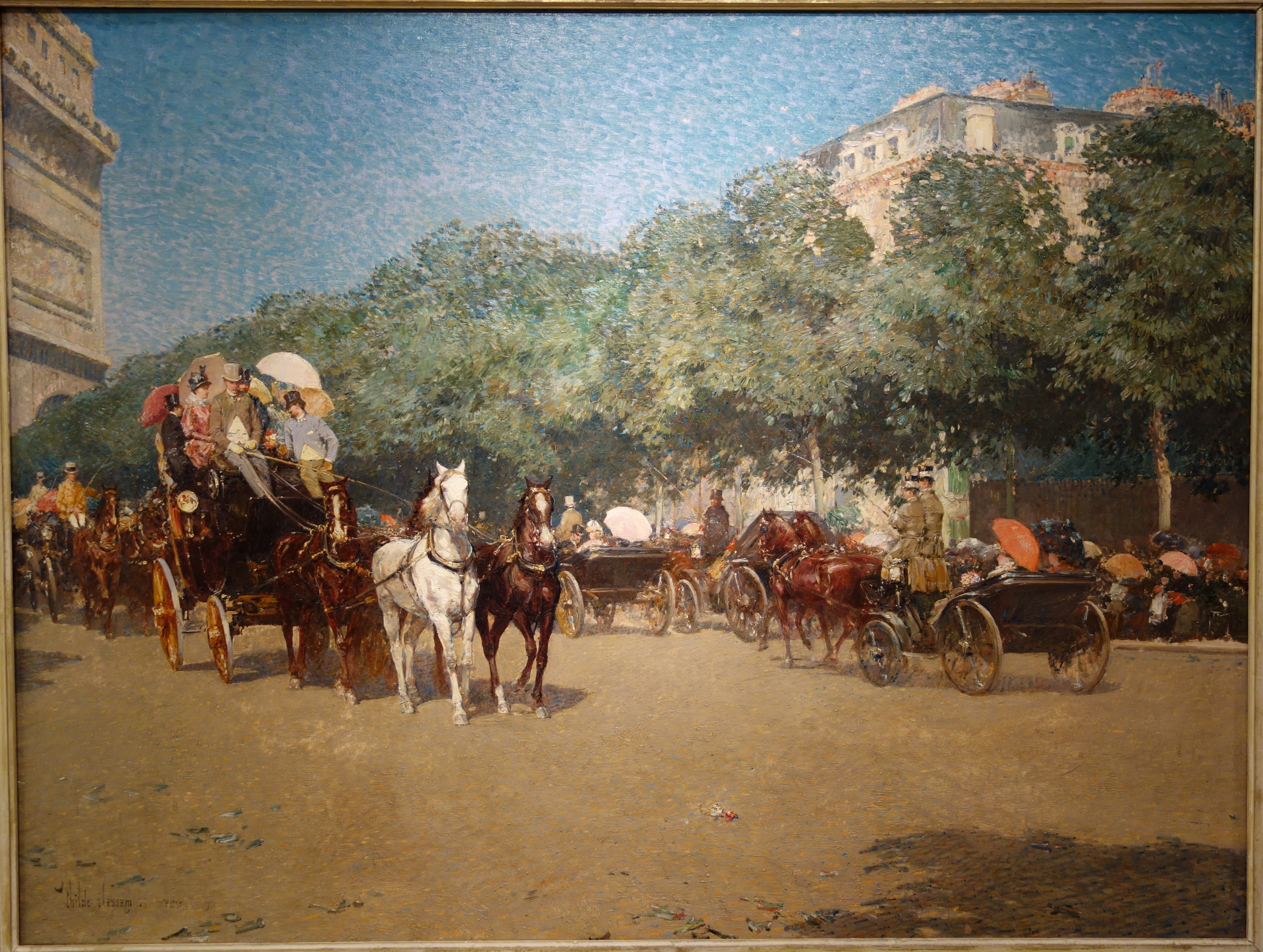
Le Jour du Grand Prix (1888)

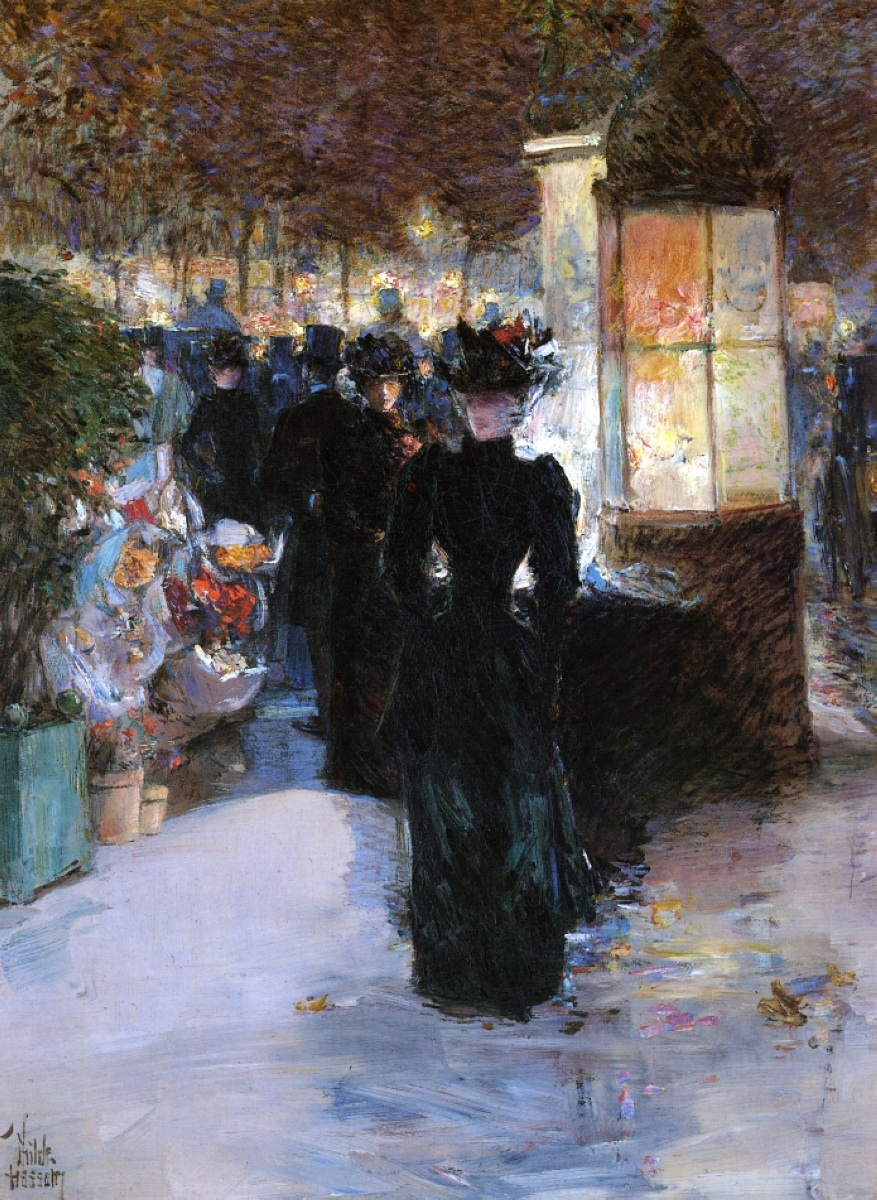
Paris Nocturne (1889)

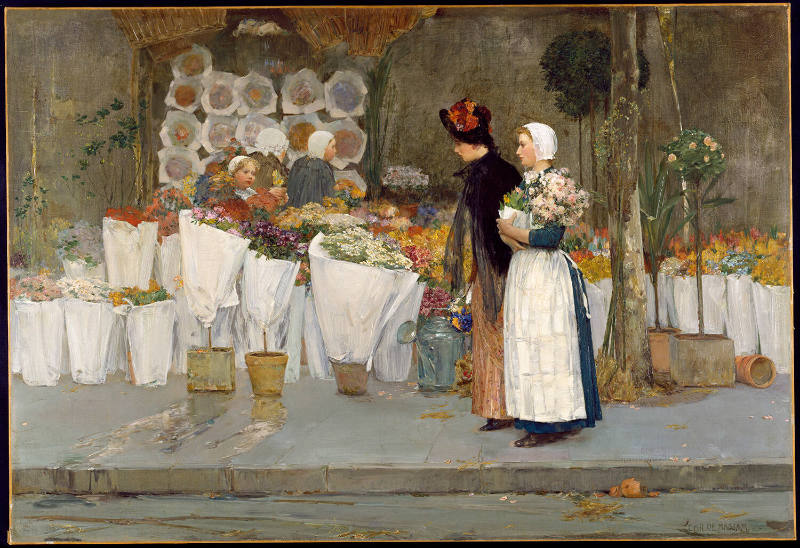
At the Florist (1889)

By early 1887, Hassam began to complain about his classes at the Académie Julian. He said he was "drawing like a slave" and expressed his dislike for the mechanical technique and the work of his teachers. He stuck it out for another year, but by the Spring of 1888 he was officially done. In a letter to his friend, Boston art critic William Howe Downes, Hassam expressed his dissatisfaction with the traditional academic art system:

It is nonsense, it crushes all originality of the growing man. It tends to put them in a rut and it keeps them in it. An artist should paint his own time and treat nature as he feels it, not repeat the same stupidities of his predecessors, for mechanical exactitude becomes stupid in art and tiresome, like all things photographic to the real artist. The men who have made success today are the men who have got out of this rut.

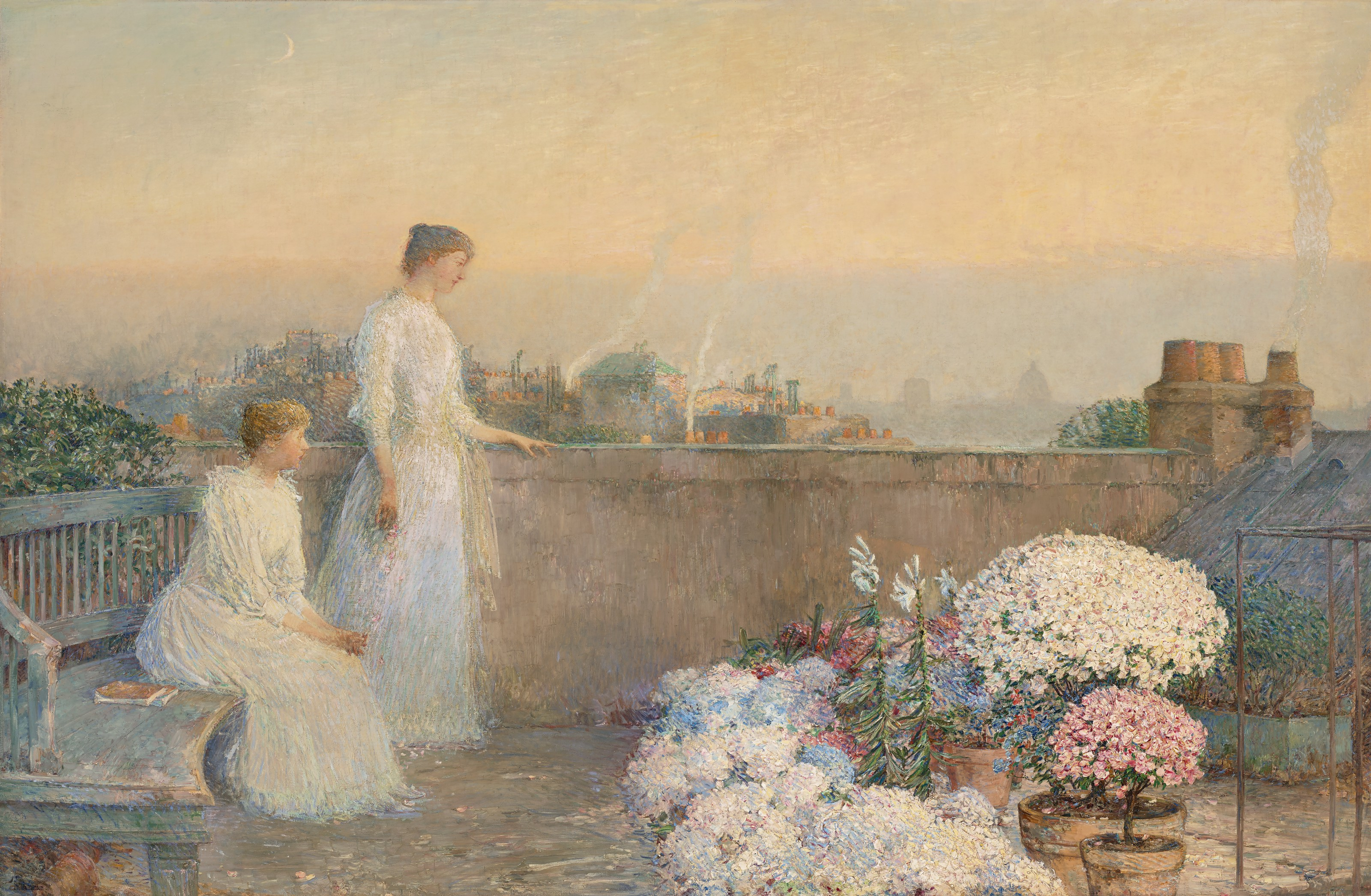
Twilight (Le Crépuscule) (c. 1888–1893)

Before returning home to the United States, the Hassams moved into a new studio at 35 Boulevard de Rochechouart, after the previous tenant, Pierre-Auguste Renoir, had moved out, leaving some of his work behind. Hassam later explained that he had no idea who Renoir was at the time, but he was impressed by his work and expressed solidarity with what he was trying to achieve. The studio is depicted in Twilight (Le Crépuscule) (1888), showing Hassam's wife and her sister on the rooftop terrace of the apartment. The painting is also the only one in his larger series of floral works in which Hassam identified all of the depicted flower species by name.

That same year, Le Jour du Grand Prix (1888) became one of Hassam's first major works in his Impressionist-influenced style and technique and was well received by critics. He also completed several floral-related works in Paris during this time, including Gathering Flowers in a French Garden (1888), Woman Cutting Roses in a Garden (c. 1888–1889), and At the Florist (1889), among others. The Hassams returned to the United States in October 1889.

== Development ==
=== Couture's country house ===
In Paris, Hassam's wife Maud became friendly with the wife (Note: Before 2004, it was often claimed in the art literature that Thomas Couture's daughter married Mr. Blumenthal. Couture had two daughters, Berthe-Genevieve and Jean-Cecile (Baroness Risler). Neither of these women married a Mr. Blumenthal. Weinberg notes that Hiesinger, Adelson and Gerdts all repeat the error in their work. Correcting the record, Weinberg writes "The Blumenthals occupied a house on an estate owned by a daughter of the French painter Thomas Couture." The original error likely comes from a misreading of an 1888 letter written by Hassam: "The proprietor of the property that my friend lives [on], married one of Couture's daughters ...") of Ernest Blumenthal, a German businessman, leading to the two couples spending three summers together, from 1887 until 1889, at the Blumenthal's country house in Villiers-le-Bel, approximately 17 km (10.8 mi) northeast of Paris in the Val-d'Oise. The 18th century estate had once belonged to French artist Thomas Couture, who bought it in 1869.

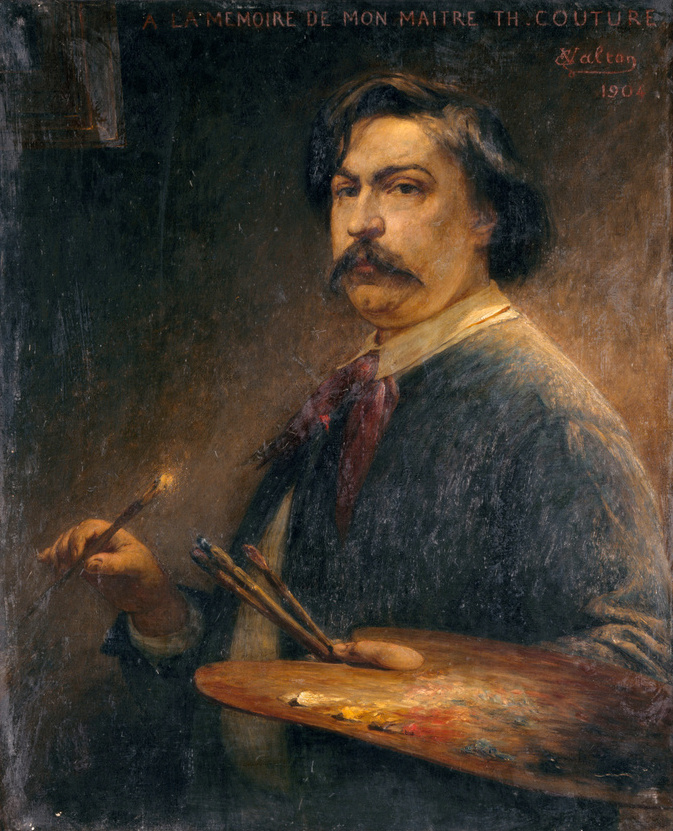
Thomas Couture (1904) by Edmond Eugène Valton

Nancy Mowll Mathews describes Couture as a "nonconformist", a painter who had once achieved great success within the framework of Academic art with works like The Romans in their Decadence (1847), but in the end, criticized the entire system and left it behind. Couture retreated at first to his home in Senlis, then to a country estate in Villiers-le-Bel in 1869, where he sunk into relative obscurity until his death in 1879.

Before his departure from the art world, Couture was notable for having taught both William Morris Hunt and Edouard Manet, and in the late 1860s, Mary Cassatt. Couture's estate was occupied and looted by Prussian forces in 1870 during the Franco-Prussian War, with many of his paintings stolen or destroyed. It was said that the incident broke him as an artist, and he never recovered.

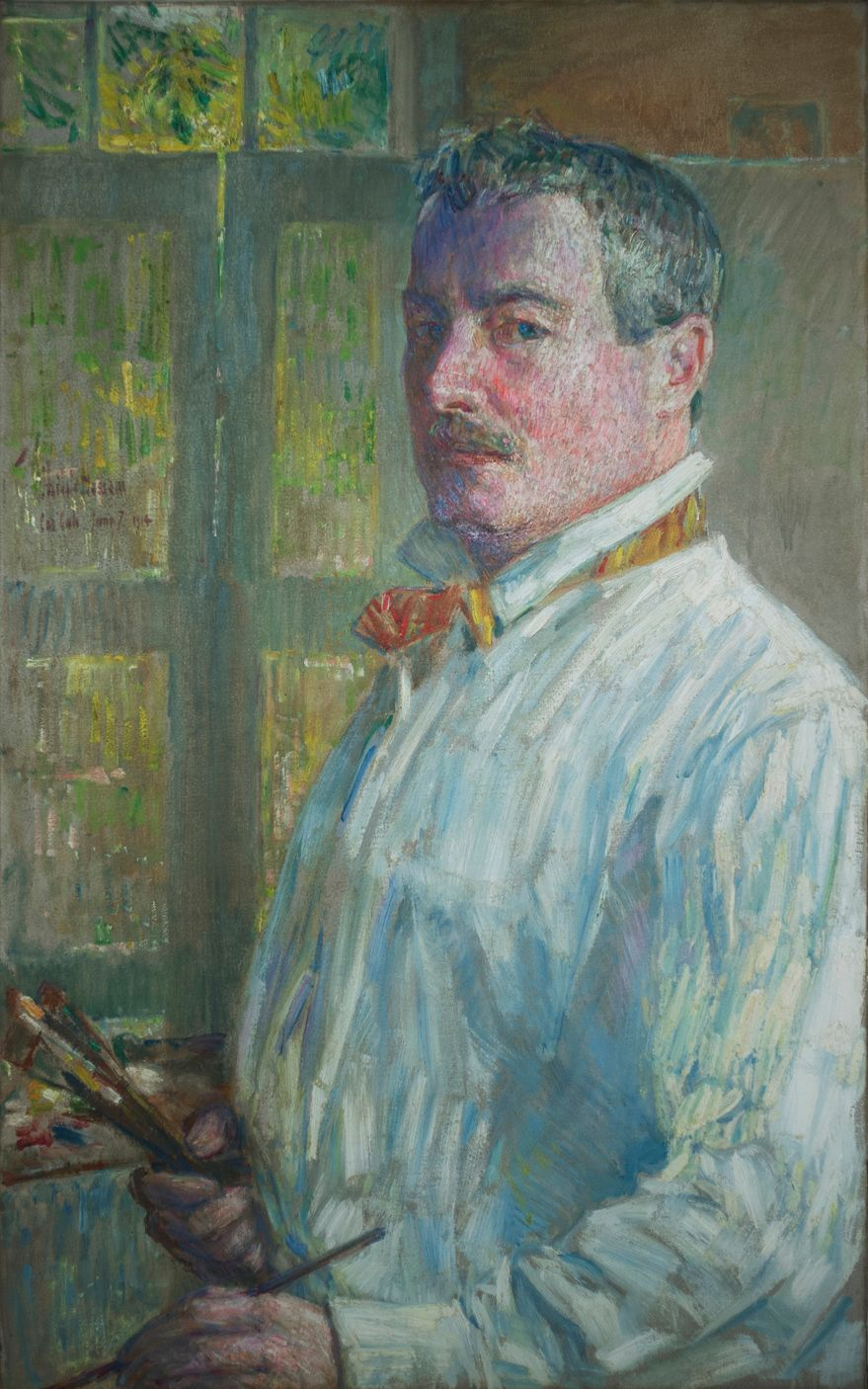
Self-Portrait (1914) by Childe Hassam

Several years after the war, American artist Ernest W. Longfellow made a pilgrimage to Couture's estate in 1876. Couture had become popular with young American artists who sought his expertise. In turn, Couture welcomed Americans with open arms. Longfellow toured the grounds with Couture, later writing about his experience in an article for The Atlantic. Longfellow noted that he found the gardens to be overgrown and in a state of disrepair.

When Hassam first visited Couture's former estate a decade later with his wife and the Blumenthals, he discovered that the house still contained many of the old master's paintings on its walls. He was particularly taken with the gardens. Over time, Hassam had developed a personal interest in Couture for two main reasons. More than a decade earlier, Hassam had taken life drawing classes in 1874 at the Boston Art Club with the Italian painter Tommaso Juglaris. Juglaris had previously studied under Couture in 1871. "Juglaris's impact on Hassam was significant", argues H. Barbara Weinberg. Further, William Morris Hunt, who had studied with Couture from 1847 to 1852, was a distant relative of Hassam. "The entire Impressionist circle", writes Albert Boime, "was like a planet receiving its light from Couture's sun."

== Series ==
The Villiers-le-Bel series is believed to contain approximately 24 works and according to art historian Warren Adelson represents Hassam's earliest coherent body of paintings centered on the garden motif. The series features non-native flowers cultivated by gardeners, including geraniums, oleanders, dracaena and rhododendrons. Hassam's wife sat for many of the works in the series. It is believed that After Breakfast represents the first major painting in the Villiers-le-Bel series.

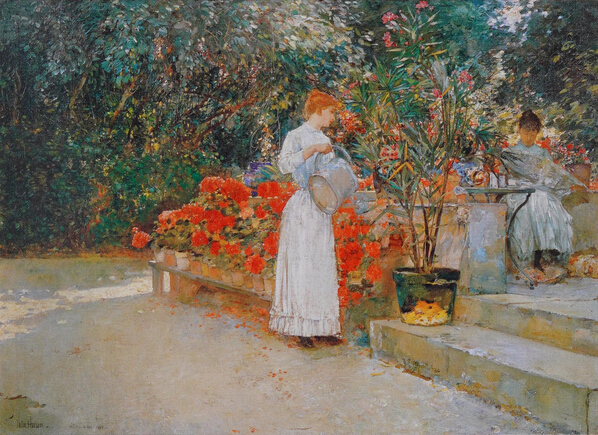
After Breakfast (1887)

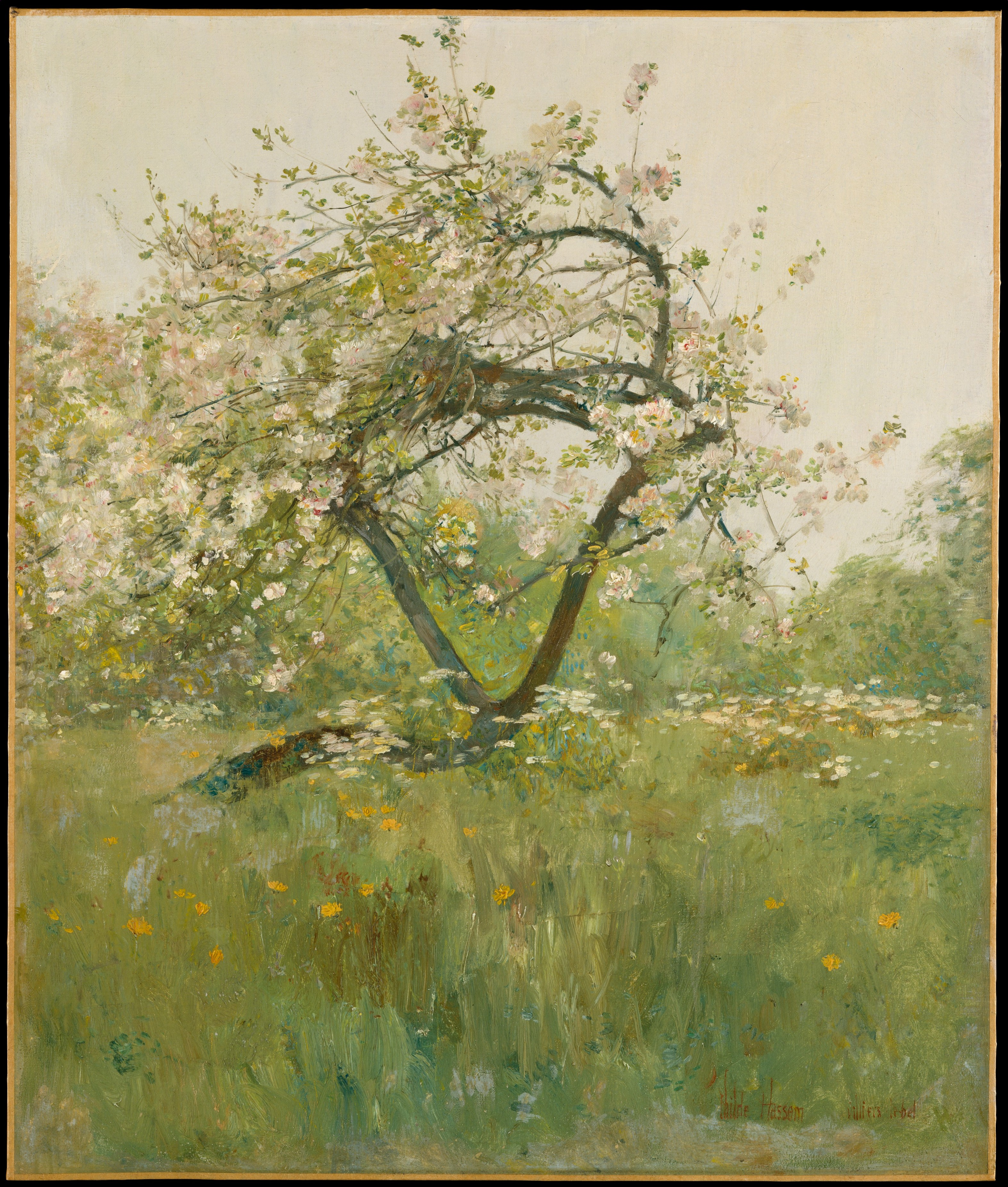
Peach Blossoms—Villiers-le-Bel (1887–1889)

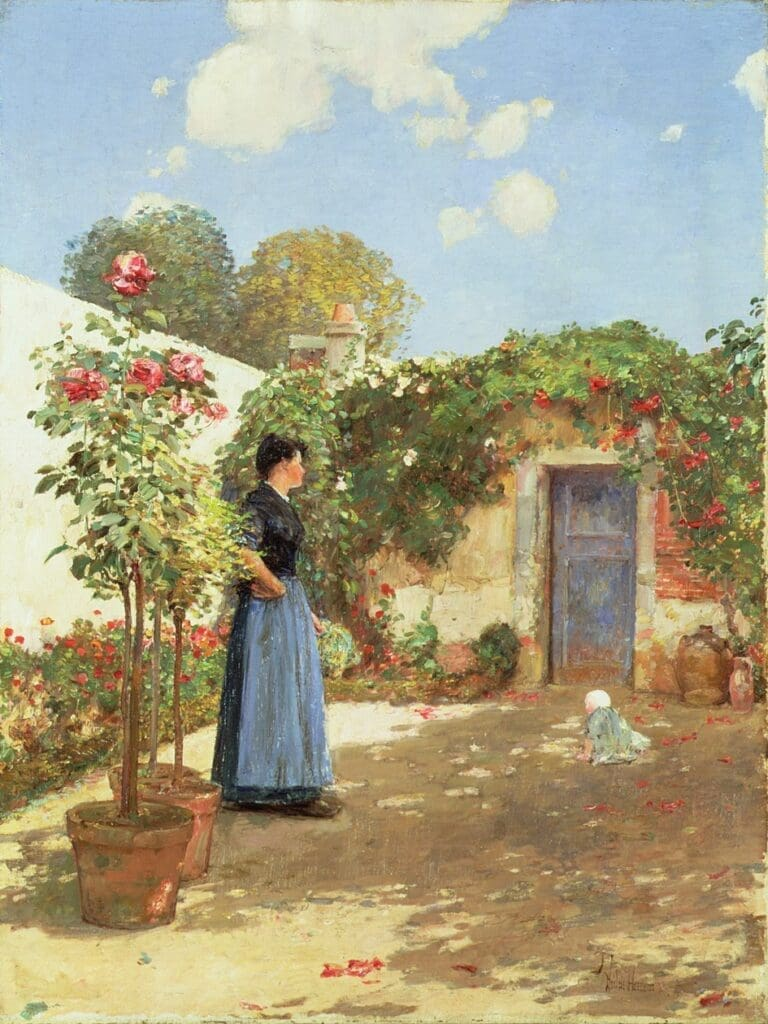
A Sunny Morning, Villiers-le-Bel (1888)

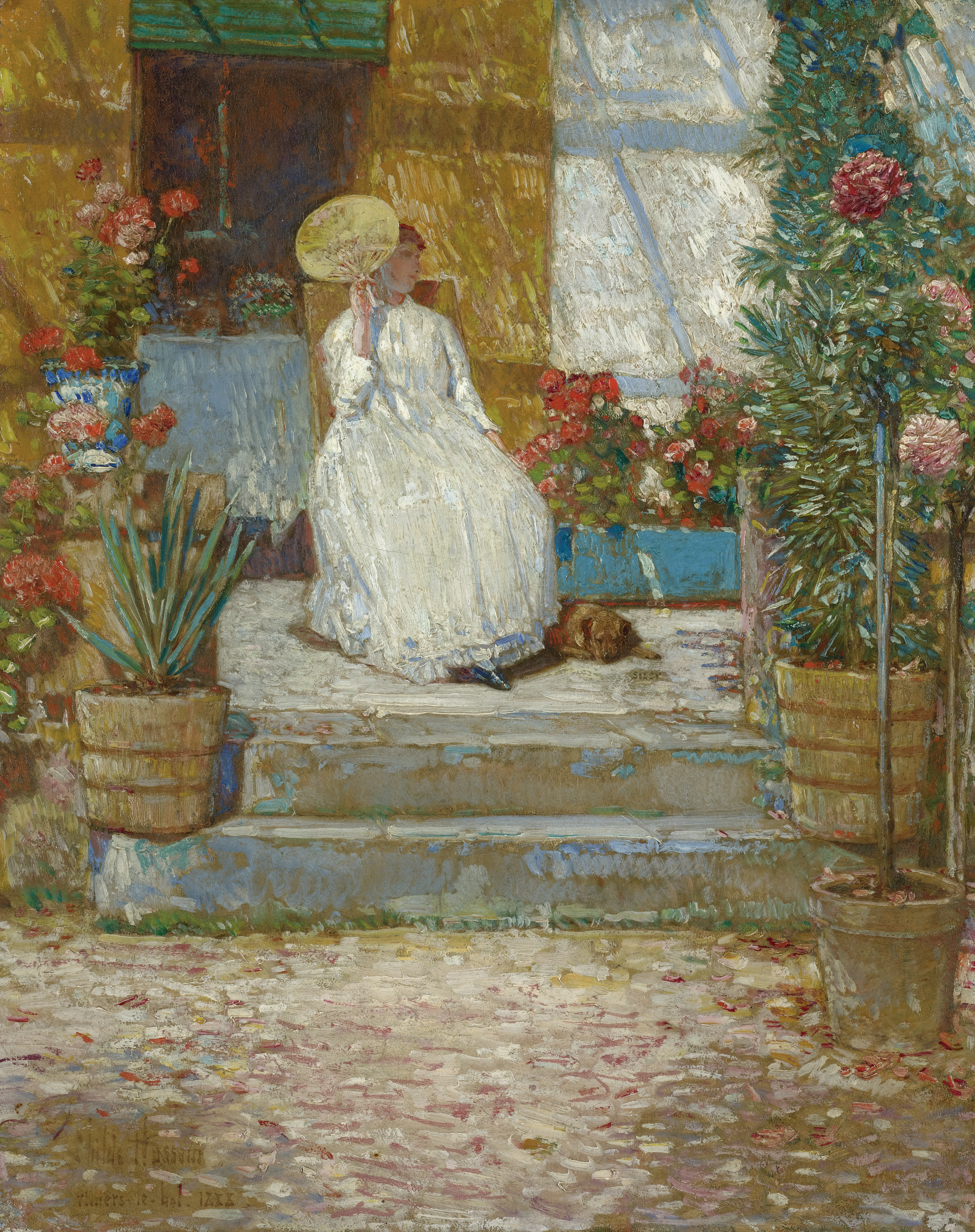
In the Sun (1888)

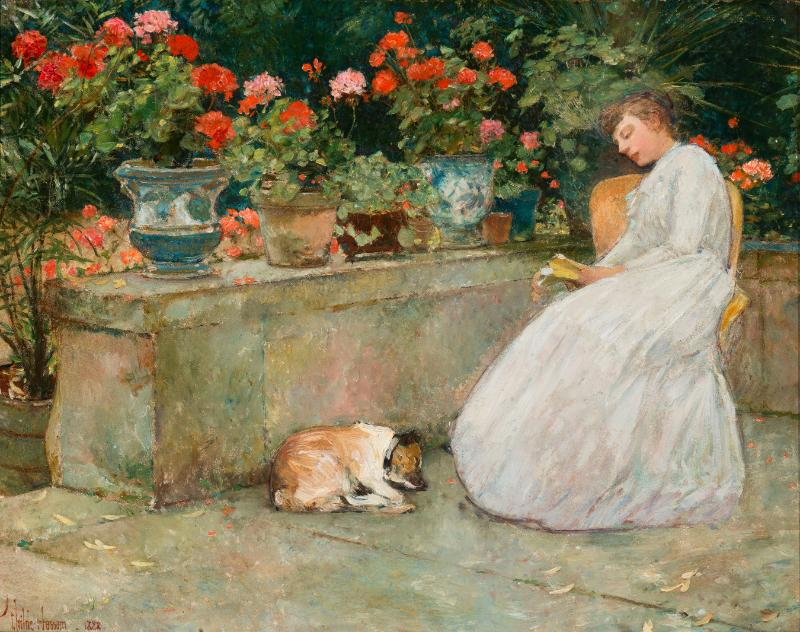
Reading (1888)

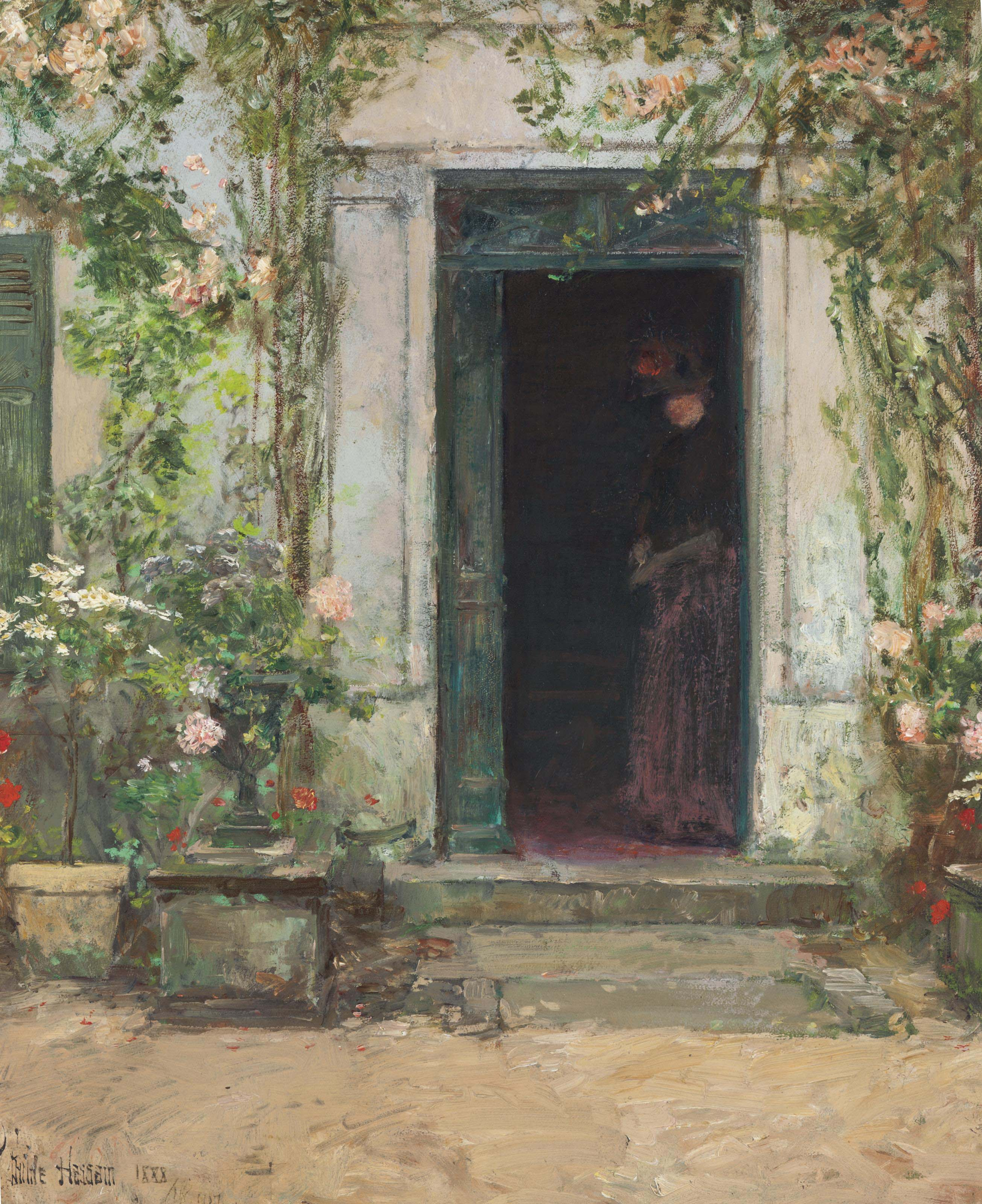
In the Doorway (1888)

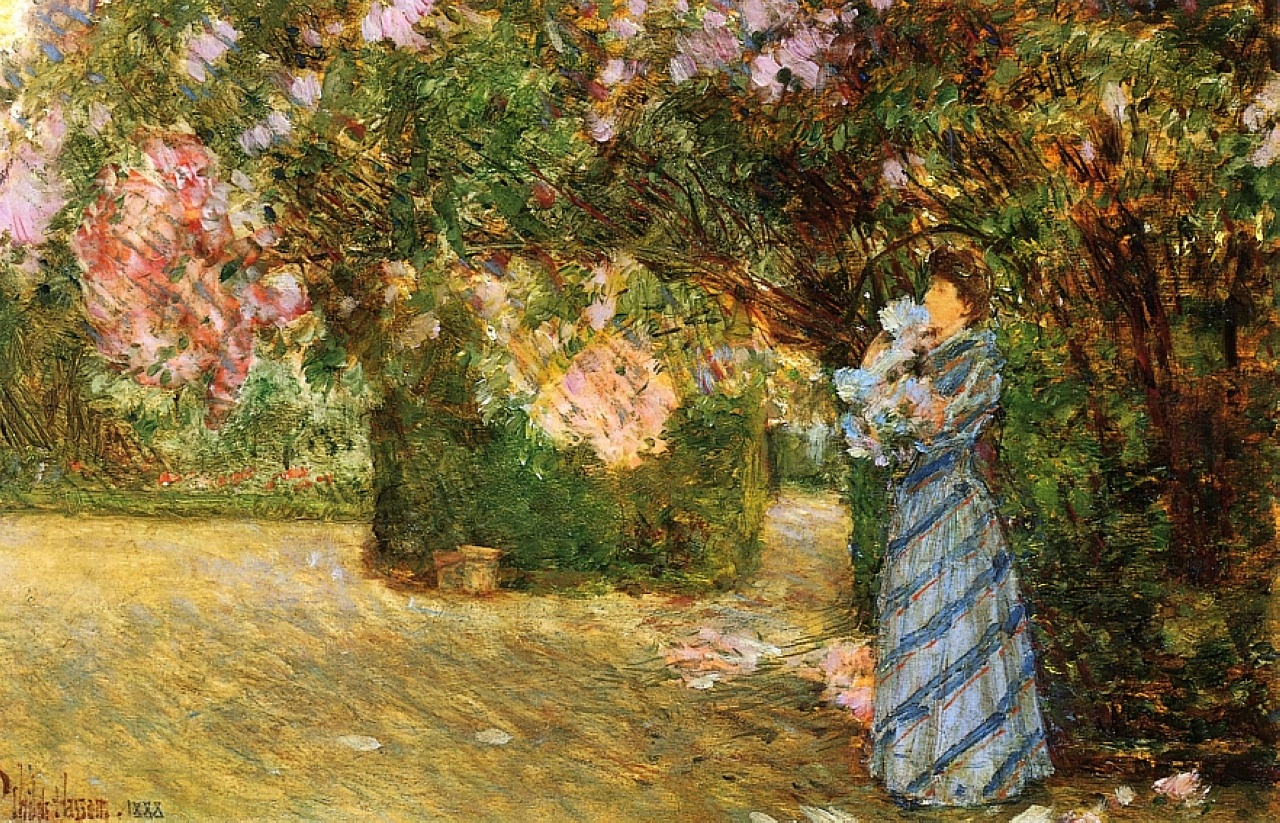
Mrs. Hassam at Villiers-le-Bel (1888)

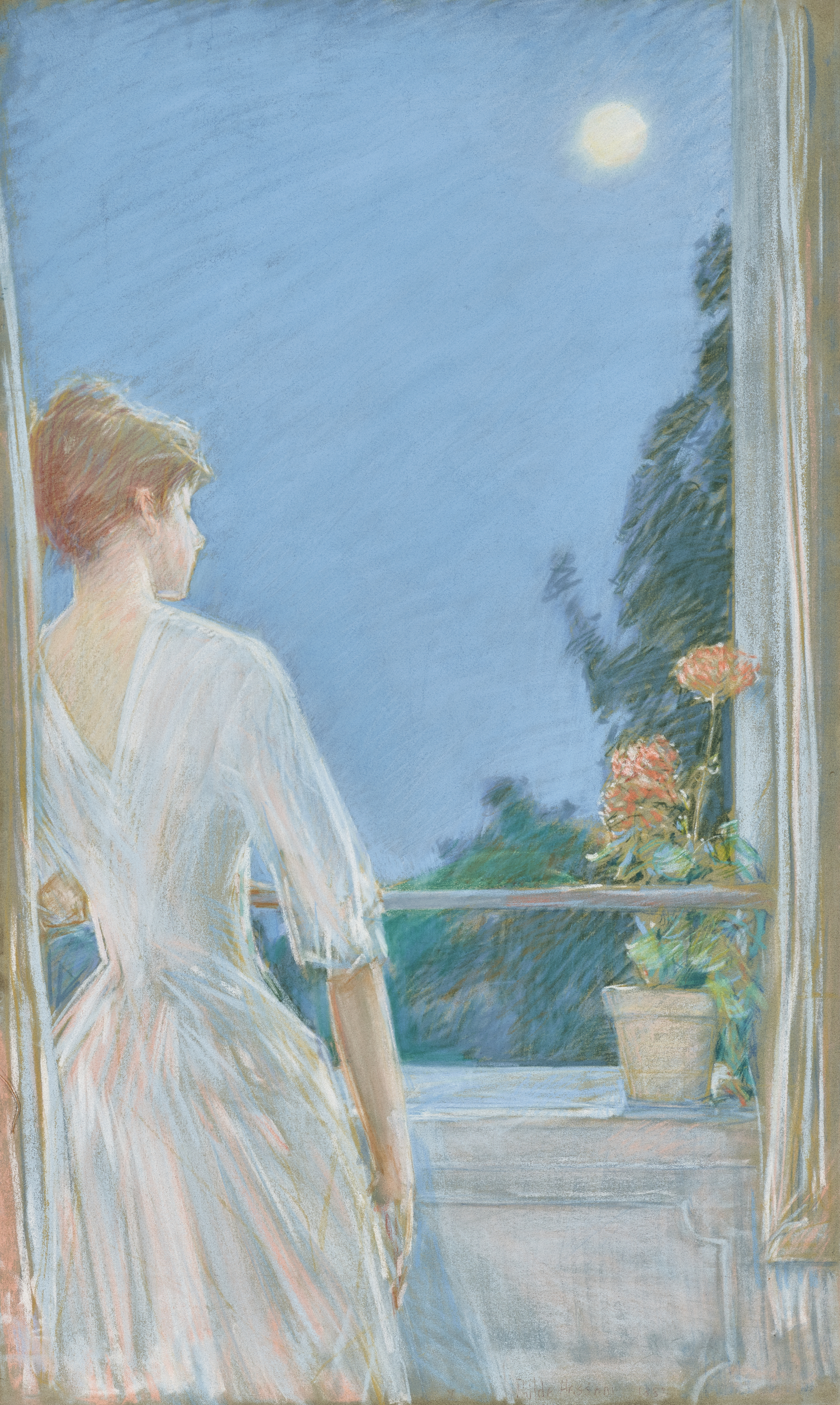
On the Balcony (1888)

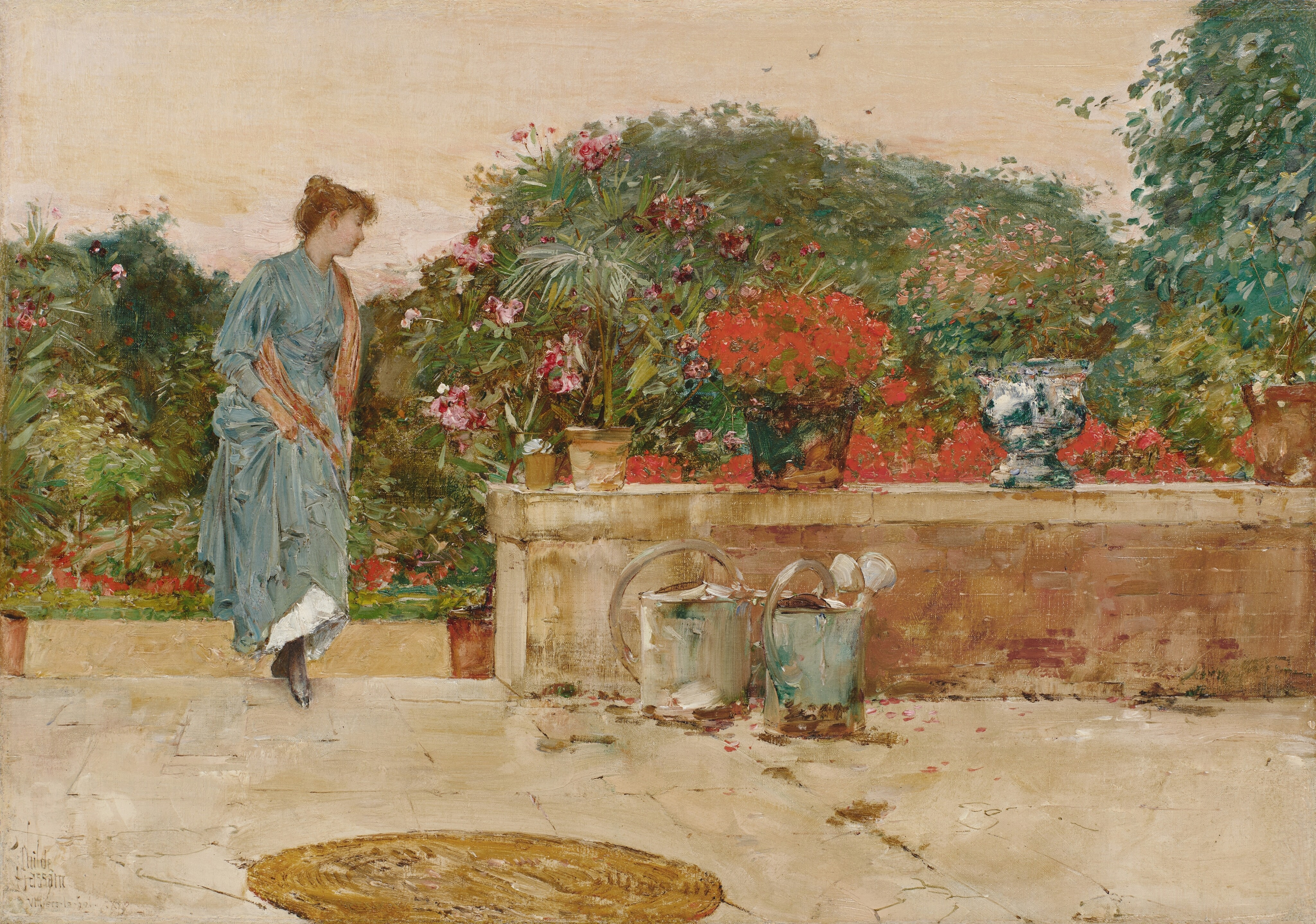
In the Garden (1888)

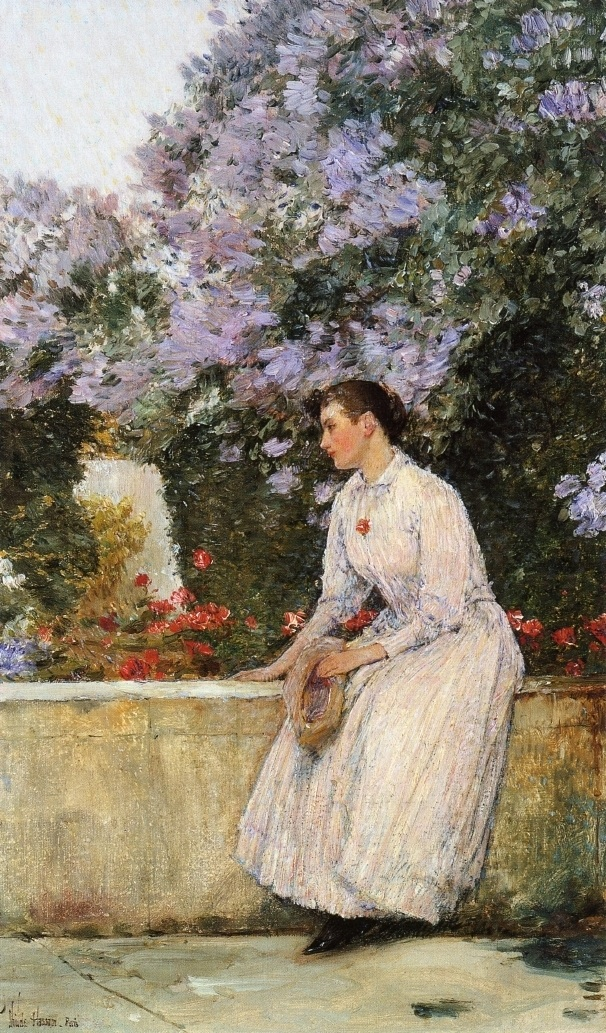
In the Garden (1888–1889)

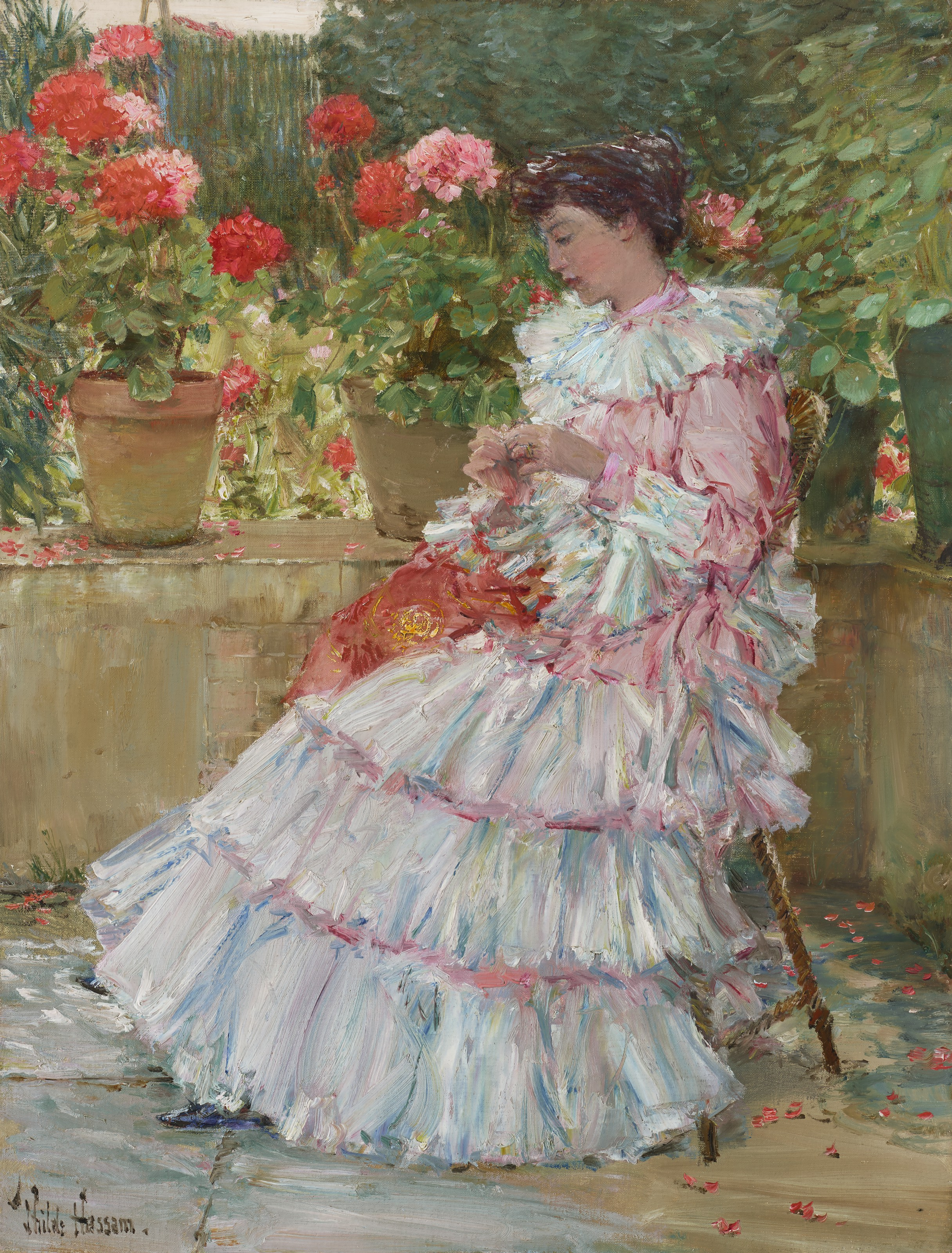
Geraniums (1888–1889)

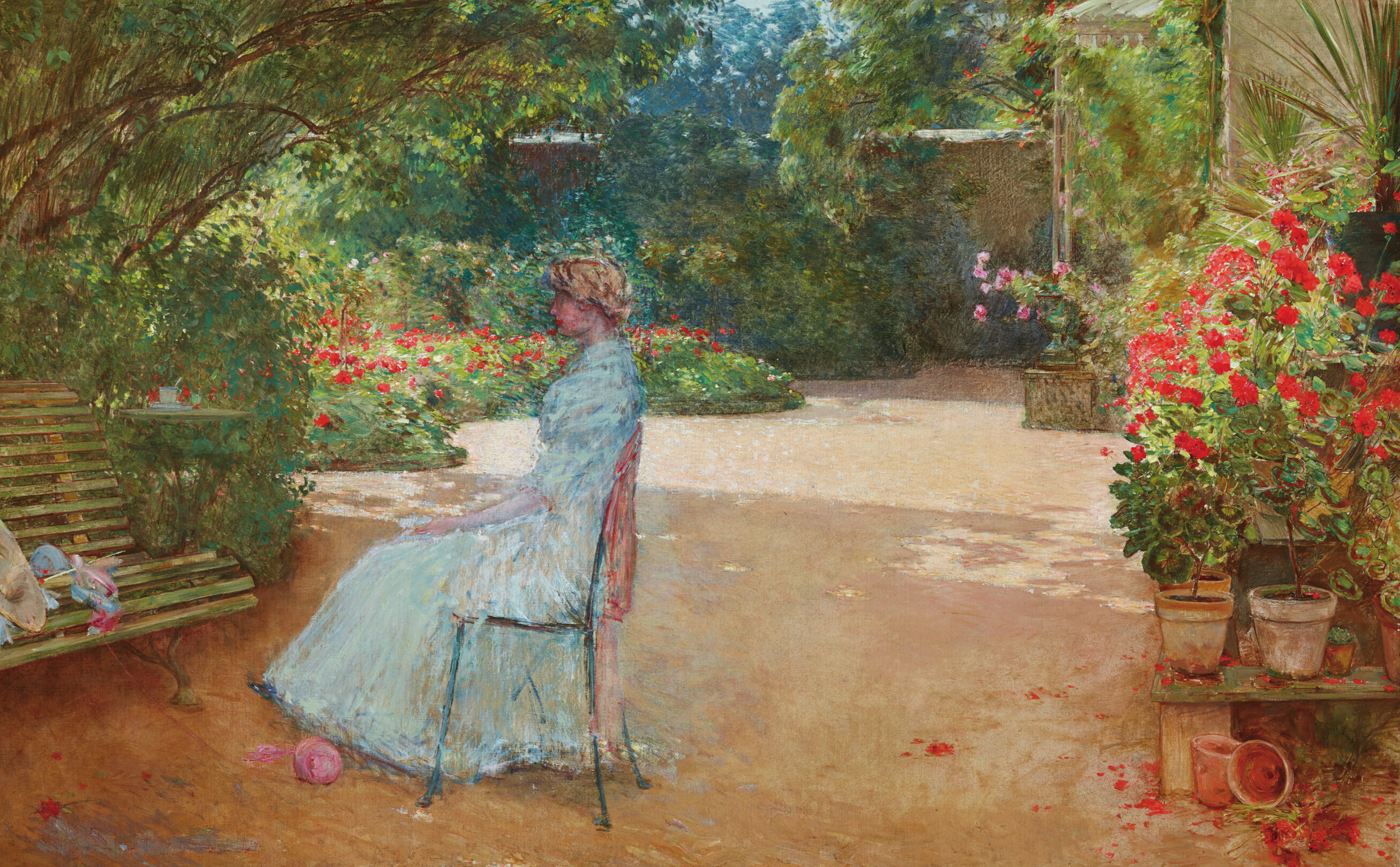
The Artist's Wife in a Garden, Villiers-le-Bel (1889)

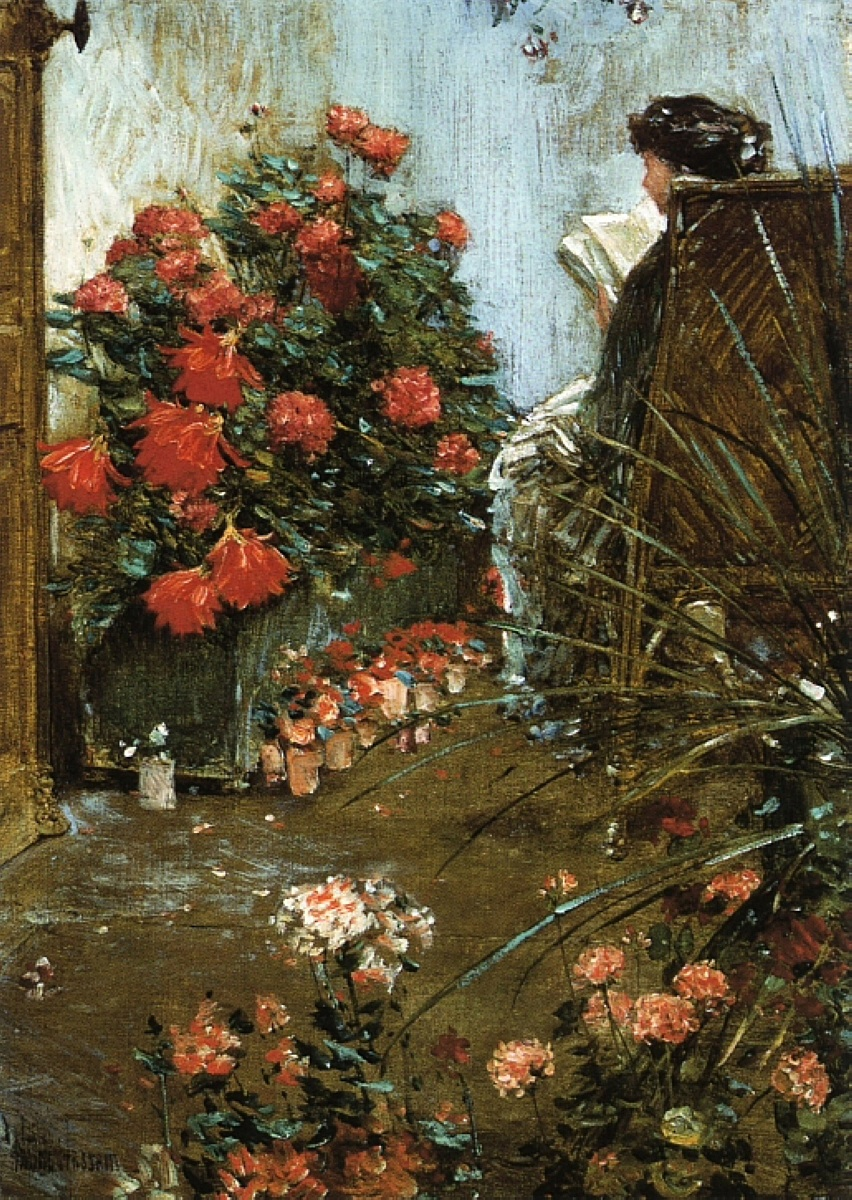
In the Garden at Villiers-le-Bel (1889)

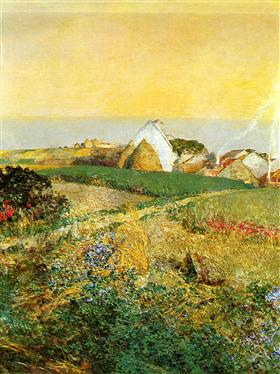
Villiers-le-Bel (The Enchanted Hour) (1889)

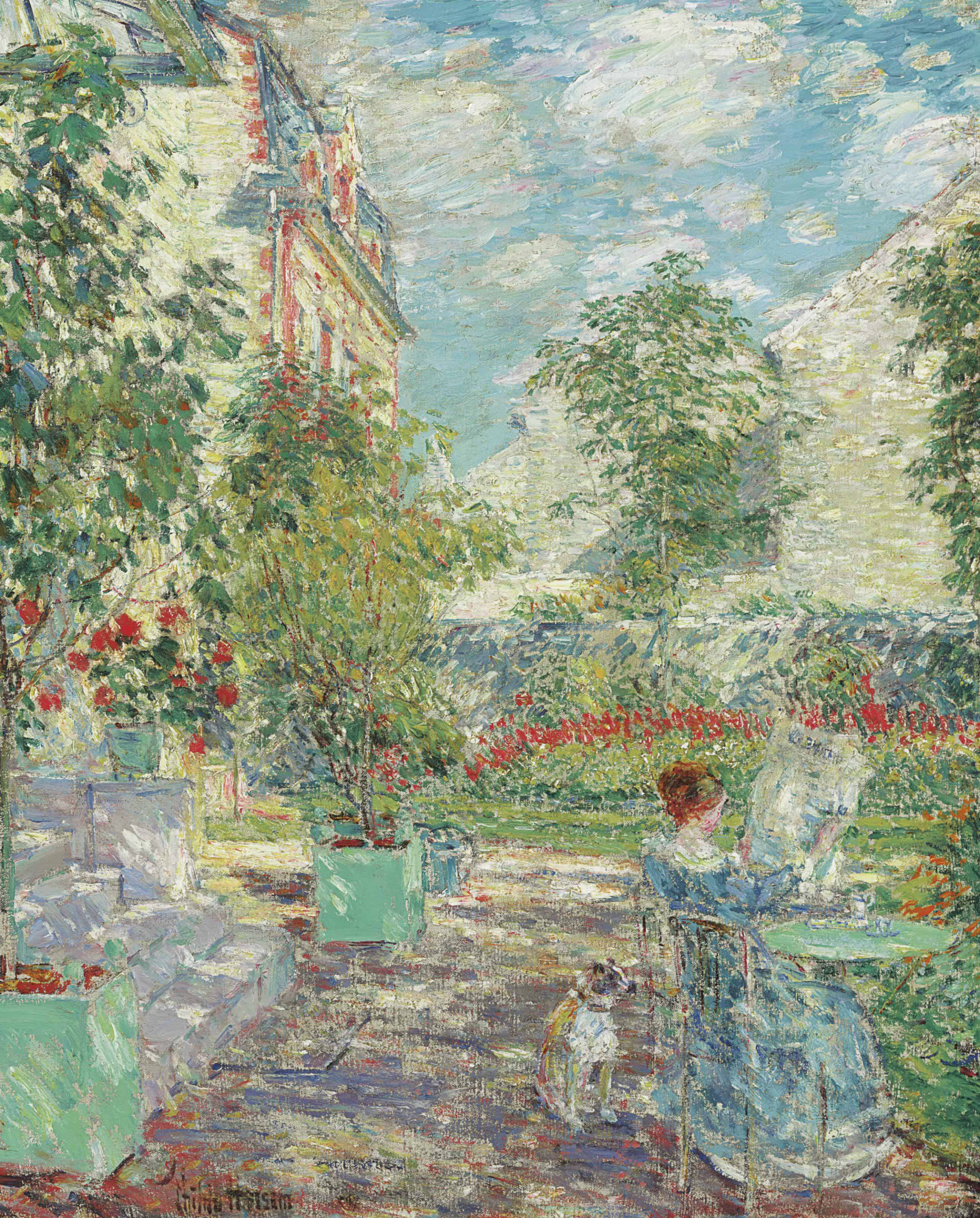
In a French Garden (1897)

Adelson notes that Hassam's The Artist's Wife in a Garden, Villiers-le-Bel (1889), shares elements with The Luncheon (1873), an earlier work by Claude Monet. It also evokes other works, such as A Sunday Afternoon on the Island of La Grande Jatte (1884–1886) by Georges Seurat, and The Garden at Petit-Gennevilliers: The Roses (1886) by Gustave Caillebotte The entire series is viewed as a prototype for Hassam's more mature garden series in the 1890s, specifically his work in Celia Thaxter's wildflower garden on Appledore Island off the coast of Maine that he began in 1889. A decade after the Villiers-le-Bel series, Hassam made a third trip to Europe in 1896, returning to Couture's estate once again to paint In a French Garden (1897), this time in a new, fully developed Impressionist style of his own.

== Reception ==
Hassam's early work was well received in the United States and Europe, but also received criticism when he introduced his new Impressionist style at home in the late 1890s. (Note: The debate over the critical response to American Impressionism is covered in some depth in regards to Hassam's role in The Artist's Garden: American Impressionism and the Garden Movement (2015).) Art critic George William Sheldon, who wrote about the artist in Recent Ideals of American Art (1888), praised his "flower gardens of country-houses". That same year, art critic Frank T. Robinson wrote optimistically about Hassam's bright future as an artist.

Hassam was very early on the scene of American Impressionism. When he began to experiment with a lighter palette and move closer towards the Impressionist aesthetic by abandoning the darkness of what he called the "molassess and bitumen school" of the older generation, he received pushback from American art critics in the 1890s, as they were not yet accustomed to this new style and found it unusual, decrying it as avant-garde.

Just several days before Hassam's 1896 exhibition of over 200 works at the American Art Association, an art critic for The New York Times alluded to its simmering controversy writing, "But if some will quarrel with this artist for his very advanced notions of the importance of certain qualities at the expense of others, he must be credited with excellent draughtsmanship, happy composition at times, and occasionally remarkably brilliant color schemes that are very alluring and excuse much eccentricity." Financially, the exhibition was later declared a "disaster" for the artist. Geraniums, considered one of his finest works in the Villiers-le-Bel series, only sold for $115 ($4,451 in 2025).

== Exhibitions ==
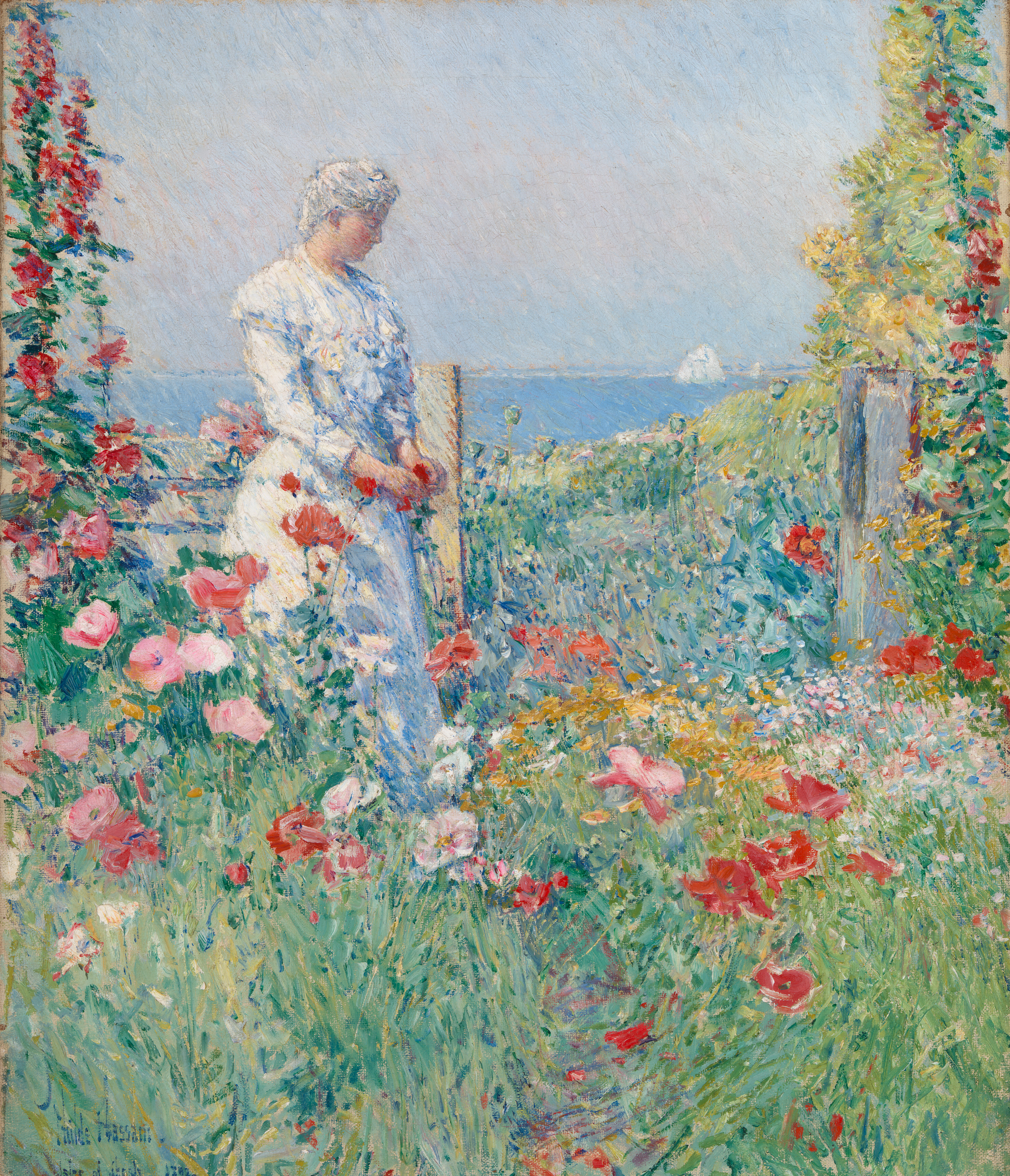
In the Garden (Celia Thaxter in Her Garden) (1892)

After Breakfast (1887) was first shown at the 1889 Paris Exposition along with Twilight (Le Crépuscule) (1888) and two other paintings, followed by its exhibition at the National Academy of Design in 1890, where it appeared under the title After Lunch. The painting is now held in the private collection of Fayez Sarofim. It was exhibited in 2004 at the Childe Hassam, American Impressionist exhibition at The Met, followed by the Three Centuries of American Art exhibit in 2021 at the Museum of Fine Arts, Houston. (Note: "After Breakfast by Childe Hassam is shown as part of Three Centuries of American Art from the Sarofim collection at Museum of Fine Arts Houston Thursday, June 24, 2021, in Houston.")

In the Sun (1888) was first exhibited at the Worcester Art Museum from 2008 to 2009. The painting was stolen in 1976 from a private collection in Massachusetts during an armed robbery. The owner and one other person were tied up by three unknown assailants while the house was ransacked for valuables. The thieves used the owner's car as a getaway vehicle, taking three paintings with them from the house: Hassam's In the Sun, The Shore of Lake Geneva by Gustave Courbet, and Lady as Shepherdess by William Hamilton. The car was later found abandoned. The owner died in 1979 and the three paintings remained missing until they were brought to an art dealer in Rhode Island for appraisal in 2007. The dealer contacted the FBI and the paintings were reunited with the last surviving relative. No arrests were made in the case.

Reading (1888) was exhibited at Painters of the Humble Truth (1981–1982), Down Garden Paths (1983–1984), and Masterworks from the Hunter Museum of American Art, Chattanooga (1996).

Geraniums (Hyde Collection, 1888–1889), widely considered to be the finest work in the series, was likely exhibited at the Salon of 1889 under the title Soleil et fleurs, and several years later as A Corner from a French Garden at the National Academy of Design. It was purchased in 1930 by Charlotte Hyde for her collection. It was also exhibited at the Childe Hassam, American Impressionist exhibition in 2004, followed by its showing at Americans in Paris, 1860–1900, also at The Met, from 2006 until 2007.

Villiers-le-Bel (The Enchanted Hour) (1889) was exhibited at the Alpha Delta Phi clubhouse in New York City in 1893.

== Selected works ==
Grayed out text indicates a work that shares the same timeframe of the series but is ambiguous as to its location and may not be part of the Villiers-le-Bel series. The symbol A is used to indicate a work has been accepted as part of the series in lieu of the forthcoming catalogue raisonné by Stuart P. Feld and Kathleen M. Burnside.

- After Breakfast, 1887. Oil on canvas, 28 3/4 × 39 5/8 in. (73 × 100.6 cm). Collection of Fayez Sarofim. A
- Peach Blossoms—Villiers-le-Bel c. 1887–1889. Oil on canvas, 18 1/8 × 21 1/2 in. (46 × 54.6 cm). The Metropolitan Museum of Art. A
- A Sunny Morning, Villiers-le-Bel, 1888. Oil on canvas, 26 × 20 in. (66 × 51 cm). Private collection. A
- In the Sun, 1888. Private collection?
- In the Doorway, 1888. Oil on board, 18 × 14 3/4 in. (45.7 × 37.5 cm). Private collection. A
- The Garden Door, 1888.
- The Rose Garden, 1888.
- Woman Cutting Roses in a Garden, c. 1888–1889. Oil on board, 18 1/8 × 14 3/8 in. (46 × 36.5 cm). Private collection.
- Mrs. Hassam at Villiers-le-Bel, 1888.
- On the Balcony, 1888. Pastel on paper laid down on canvas, 29 5/8 × 17 3/4 in. (75.2 x 45.1 cm). Private collection. A
- Lady in the Park (In the Garden) (1888)
- Reading, 1888. Oil on panel, 14 1/4 × 18 in. (36.2 × 45.7 cm). Hunter Museum of American Art. A
- Gathering Flowers in a French Garden, 1888. Oil on canvas, 28 × 21 3/4 in. (71.1 × 55.1 cm). Worcester Art Museum.
- The Artist's Wife in a Garden, Villiers-le-Bel, 1889. Oil on canvas. 33 × 51 1/4 in. (83.8 × 130.2 cm). Private collection. A
- Geraniums, 1888–1889. Oil on canvas, 18 1/4 × 13 in. (46.4 × 33 cm). The Hyde Collection. A
- Geraniums, c. 1888–1889. Oil on Canvas, 23 3/4 × 18 in. (60.3 × 45.7 cm). Private collection. A
- In the Garden, c. 1888–1889. Oil on canvas, 18 × 10 3/4 in. (45.7 × 27.3 cm). Private collection.
- In the Garden at Villiers-le-Bel, 1889. Unknown, 18 1/4 x 12 7/8 in. (46.4 x 32.7 cm). Private Collection.
- Mrs. Hassam in their Garden, 1889. Oil on canvas, 34 x 52 1/2 inc. (86.4 x 134.3 cm). Private collection.
- Villiers-le-Bel (The Enchanted Hour), 1889. Oil on canvas, 51 × 38 1/2 in. (129.5 × 97.8 cm). Unknown.
- Afternoon in the Lane Villiers-le-Bel (Unknown)
- Mrs. Hassam in the Garden, 1896. Oil on canvas, 24 × 19 3/4 in. (61 × 50.2 cm). Private collection.
- In a French Garden, 1897. Oil on canvas, 25 3/4 × 21 1/4 in. (65.4 × 53.9 cm). Private collection. A

== Sources ==
- Adelson, Warren (1999). "Childe Hassam: Cosmopolitan and Patriot". In Grubb, Nancy (ed.). Childe Hassam, Impressionist. Abbeville Press. ISBN 9780789205872. OCLC 40744509.
- Boime, Albert (1980). Thomas Couture and the Eclectic Vision. Yale University Press. ISBN 9780300021585. OCLC 5612079.
- "Catalogue Note". Childe Hassam (1859–1935), In the Sun. Christie's. 2012.
- "Childe Hassam Represented in Hyde Art Collection". The Post-Star. April 29, 1965.
- "A Club's Loan Exhibition". The New York Times. December 9, 1893.
- Dansby, Andrew (June 27, 2021). "Monet to Matisse: Bemberg exhibition offers Houstonians masterpieces that would otherwise require travel". Houston Chronicle. Archived from the original on June 27, 2021.
- Finnegan, Richard H. (1999). "Chronology". In Grubb, Nancy (ed.). Childe Hassam, Impressionist. Abbeville Press. ISBN 9780789205872. OCLC 40744509.
- Gerdts, William H. (1983). Down Garden Paths: The Floral Environment in American Art. Fairleigh Dickinson University Press. ISBN 9780838632147. OCLC 9826165.
- Gerdts, William H. (1999). "Three Themes". In Grubb, Nancy (ed.). Childe Hassam, Impressionist. Abbeville Press. ISBN 9780789205872. OCLC 40744509.
- Hassam, Childe. "Gathering Flowers in a French Garden". Object number: 1940.87. Worcester Art Museum.
- Hassam, Childe. "Geraniums". Object number: 1971.22. The Hyde Collection.
- Hassam, Childe. "Peach Blossoms—Villiers-le-Bel". Object number: 1979.490.9. The Metropolitan Museum of Art.
- Hayward, Peter (November 29, 2010). "Visions of Heaven". Tufts Journal. Tufts University.
- Hiesinger, Ulrich W. (1994). Childe Hassam: American Impressionist. Prestel. ISBN 9783791313641. OCLC 1472064052.
- Hill, May Brawley (2010). The American Impressionists in the Garden. Cheekwood Botanical Garden and Museum of Art. ISBN 9780826516923. OCLC 427644932.
- Hoopes, Donelson F. (1988) [1979]. Childe Hassam. Watson-Guptill Publications. ISBN 9780823006212. OCLC 18558148.
- "In the World of Art". The New York Times. February 2, 1896. p. 12.
- Kuhnmunch, Jacques. "Thomas Couture (1815-1879)". Catalogue des peintures du château de Compiegne. Château de Compiègne.
- Longfellow, Ernest W. (August 1883). "Reminiscences of Thomas Couture". The Atlantic. 52 (310).
- "Lot Essay". Property from the Estate of Rhonie H. Berlinger, Childe Hassam (1859–1935), Mrs. Hassam in the Garden. Christie's. 2004.
- "Lot Essay". Property of an Estate, Childe Hassam (1859–1935), In a French Garden. Christie's. 2013.
- "Lot Essay". Distinguished American Art from a New York Private Collection, Childe Hassam (1859–1935), In the Doorway. Christie's. 2016.
- "Lot Essay". Childe Hassam (1859–1935), Geraniums. The Cox Collection: The Story of Impressionism. Christie's. 2021.
- "Lot Essay". Childe Hassam (1859–1935), Le Crépuscule. The Cox Collection: The Story of Impressionism. Christie's. 2021.
- Mathews, Nancy Mowll (1998) [1994]. Mary Cassatt: A Life. Yale University Press. ISBN 9780300077544. OCLC 971439798.
- "Paintings, stolen in 1976, going to NYC auction". WPVI-TV. ABC. April 26, 2012.
- Simak, Ellen (2001). A Catalogue of the American Collection, Hunter Museum of Art, Chattanooga, Tennessee. Vol. 2. Hunter Museum of Art. ISBN 9780961508029. OCLC 52606362.
- "The Society of American Artists Exhibition". The Art Amateur. 23 (1): 3–5. 1890.Full access available to users of The Wikipedia Library.
- Stewart, Doug (August 2004). "Impressionism's American Childe". Smithsonian Magazine. 35 (5).
- Tinterow, Gary, ed. (2020). Masterpieces from the Fayez S. Sarofim Collection: From Antiquity to Abstraction. June 27 – September 6, 2021. Museum of Fine Arts, Houston. ISBN 9780890901977. OCLC 1260634532.
- Weinberg, H. Barbara (2004). "Hassam in Paris, 1886–1889". Childe Hassam, American Impressionist. Metropolitan Museum of Art. ISBN 9781588391193. OCLC 54500279.
- Weinberg, H. Barbara (November 2006). "American Painters in Paris, 1860-1900: Urban Encounters and Rural Retreats". Magazine Antiques. 170 (5). ProQuest 211152096, EBSCOhost 23176757.(subscription required)
