= Lycée Pierre Mendès France =

Lycée Pierre Mendès France may refer to:

In France:

- Lycée Pierre Mendès France in Ris-Orangis, Essonne (Paris metropolitan area)
- Lycée Pierre Mendès France in Vitrolles, Bouches-du-Rhône (Marseille area)
- Lycée Pierre Mendès France in Villiers-le-Bel, Val d'Oise (Paris metropolitan area)

Outside of France:

- Lycée Pierre Mendès France (Tunisia)
