= Valton =

Valton is a surname. Notable people with the surname include:

- Arvo Valton (1935–2024), Estonian writer
- Edmond Eugène Valton (1836–1910), French artist
- Jules Valton (1867–1941), French sailor

== See also ==
- Valton, Wisconsin, unincorporated community in the United States
