= University Paris-Dauphine Tunis =

University in Tunisia

Coordinates: 36.8169°N 10.1701°E

- معهد تونس دوفين
- Type: Private university
- Established: October 5, 2009
- Director: Amina Bouzguenda Zeghal
- Location: Tunis, Tunisia
- Campus: 20, rue Baudelaire 1005 El Omrane
- Language: French
- Website: tunis.dauphine.psl.eu

The University Paris-Dauphine Tunis, officially known as University Paris Dauphine-PSL, Tunis Campus, is a private higher education and research institution based in Tunis, Tunisia. It was the first international campus of Paris-Dauphine University upon its establishment.

== History ==
Opened on October 5, 2009, the university initially offered two bachelor's degrees: one in business administration and applied economics, and another in mathematics and applied computer science in economics and business.

In 2011, it enrolled about 80 students, more than half of whom came from the French high schools Lycée Pierre-Mendès-France and Lycée Gustave-Flaubert (La Marsa), paying 6,500 Tunisian dinars per year.

Starting in 2014, a master's program in actuarial science was launched, followed by two masters in big data and information systems management in 2016, and another in Islamic finance in 2018. Integrated masters in audit and consulting, combining training and professional experience in Tunisian firms, complement this offering.

== Status ==
The institution is a subsidiary of Paris-Dauphine University, which owns 33% of the shares in the joint stock company, alongside Banque de Tunisie and Arab International Bank of Tunisia.

As a subsidiary, it offers the same examination subjects to its students, with professors from Paris teaching more than half of the courses as of 2011.

== Leadership ==
At its inception, the university was led by Ridha Ferchiou, with Elyès Jouini serving as vice-president, and as of March 31, 2014, Amina Bouzguenda Zeghal was appointed as the General Director.
