= Lycée Jean Jacques Rousseau =

Lycée Jean Jacques Rousseau may refer to:

== In France ==
- Lycée Jean-Jacques Rousseau (Montmorency, Val-d'Oise), Montmorency, Val-d'Oise
- Lycée Jean Jacques Rousseau (Sarcelles)

== In Vietnam ==
- Lycée Lê Quý Đôn, a high-school in Ho Chi Minh City, the capital of Vietnam. From 1958 to 1970, it was named lycée Jean-Jacques Rousseau.
