= Alexandre Beljame =

18th/19th-century French writer

Alexandre Beljame (26 November 1842 – 19 September 1906) was a French writer.

== Life ==
He was born at Villiers-le-Bel, Val-d'Oise. He spent part of his childhood in England and was a frequent visitor in London. His lectures on English literature at the Sorbonne, where a chair was created expressly for him, did much to promote the study of English in France. In 1905–1906 he was Clark lecturer on English literature at Trinity College, Cambridge. He died at Domont (Val-d'Oise) on 19 September 1906.

His best known book was a masterly study of the conditions of literary life in England in the 18th century, illustrated by the lives of Dryden, Addison and Pope. This book, Le Public et les hommes de lettres en Angleterre au XVIII' siècle (1881), was crowned by the French Academy on the appearance of the second edition in 1897. He was a good Shakespearian scholar, and his editions of Macbeth, Othello and Julius Caesar also received an academic prize in 1902.

Beljame received the honorary degree of Doctor of Laws from the University of Glasgow in early 1903.
