= Thomas Couture =

French painter (1815–1879)

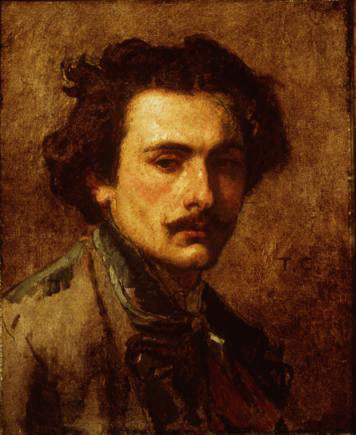
- Thomas Couture, self-portrait
- Born: 21 December 1815; Senlis, Oise, France
- Died: 30 March 1879 (aged 63); Villiers-le-Bel, Val-d'Oise, France
- Resting place: Père Lachaise Cemetery, Paris, France
- Education: École des Arts et Métiers
- Known for: Painting, author
- Notable work: Romans in the Decadence of the Empire

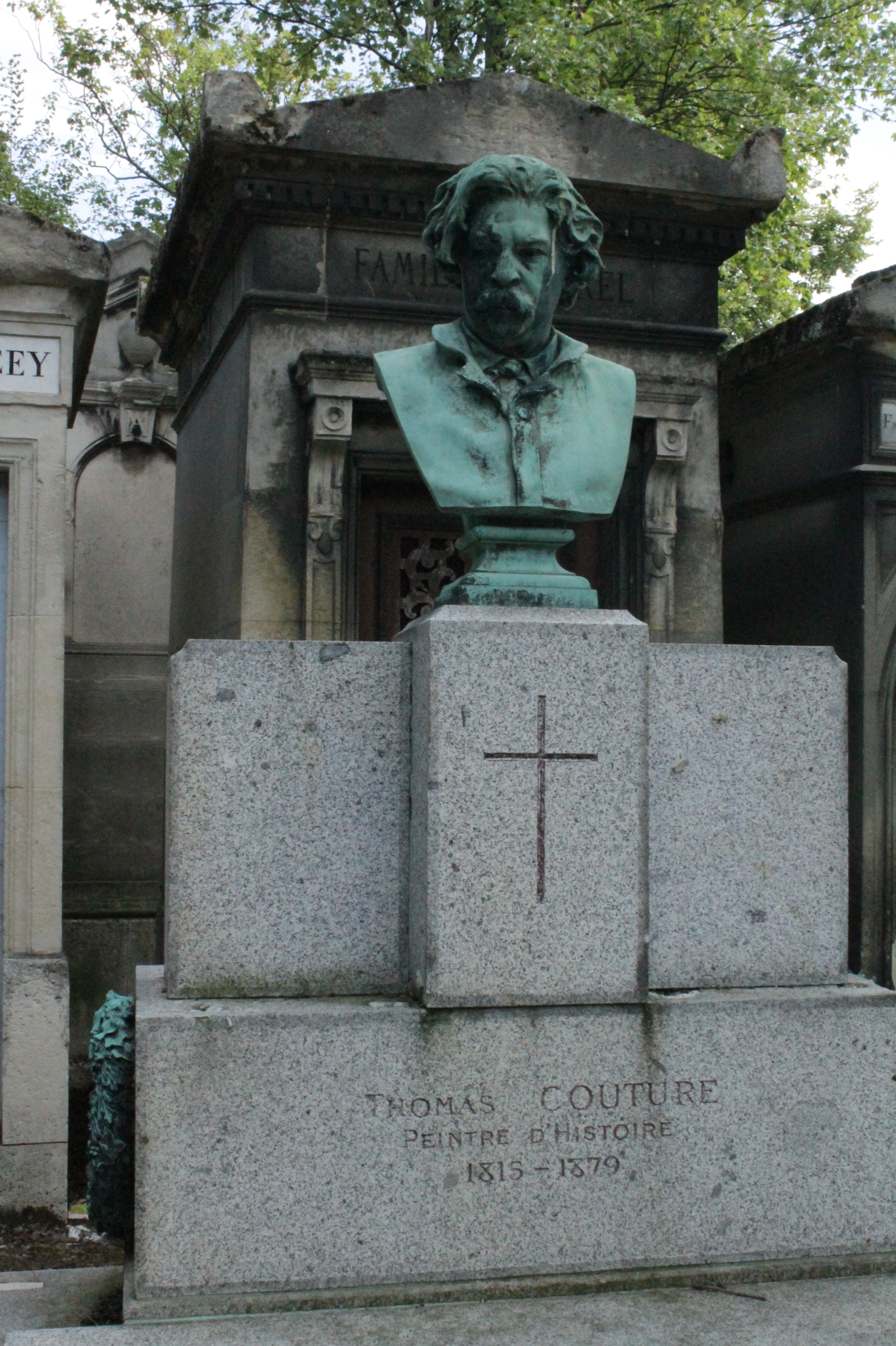
The grave of Thomas Couture, Pere Lachaise Cemetery, Paris

Thomas Couture (French pronunciation: [tɔma kutyʁ]; 21 December 1815 – 30 March 1879) was a French history painter and teacher. He taught many notable contemporary figures of the art world, such as Édouard Manet, Henri Fantin-Latour, John La Farge, Pierre Puvis de Chavannes, John Ward Dunsmore, Karel Javůrek, William Morris Hunt, and Joseph-Noël Sylvestre.

== Life ==
=== Early life and education ===
Couture was born at Senlis, Oise, France. As a child, he sold a sketch for one hundred francs.

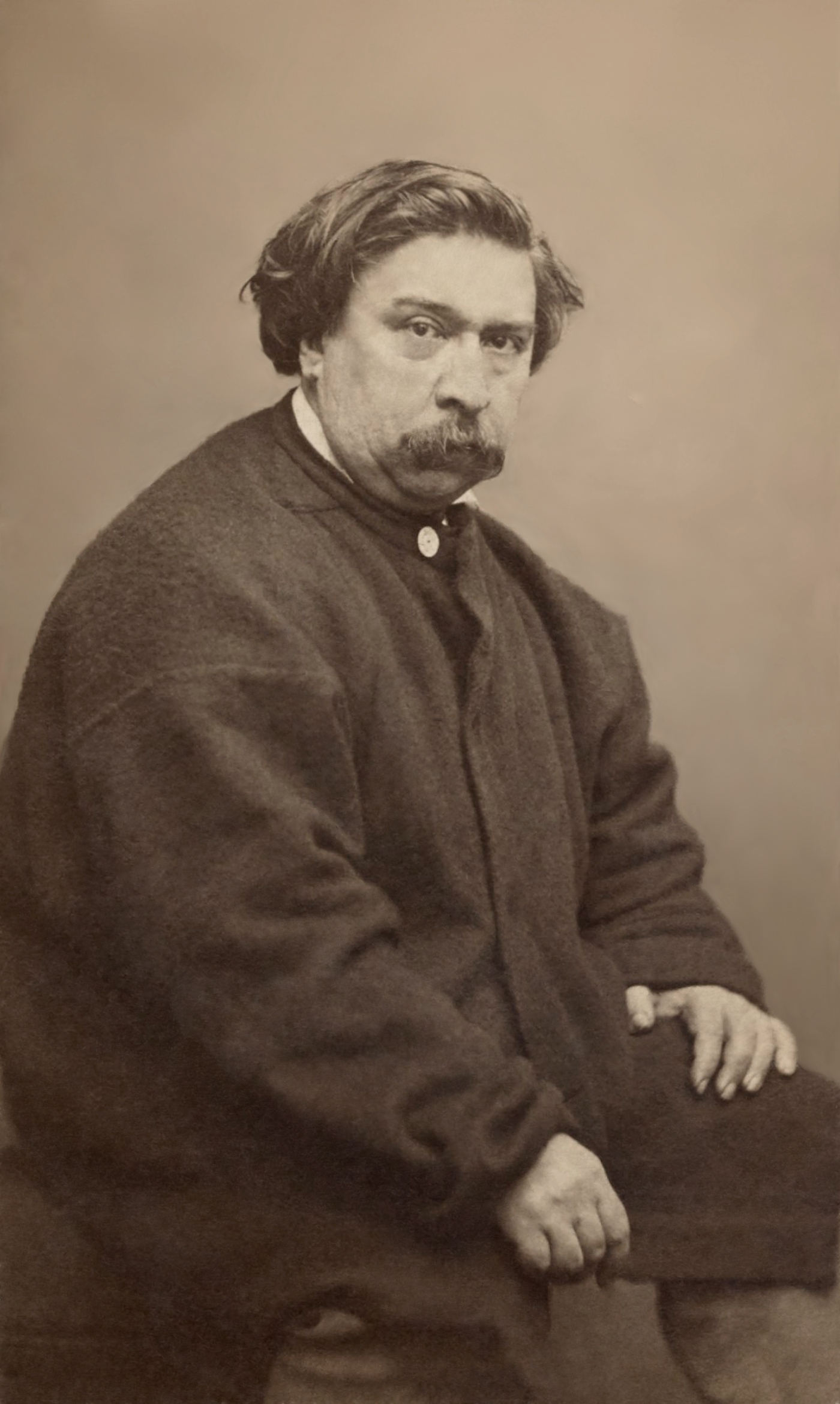
Photographic portrait, by Étienne Carjat, ca.1860

When he was 11 his family moved to Paris, where he would study at the industrial arts school (École des Arts et Métiers) and later at the École des Beaux-Arts.

He was a student of Baron Antoine Jean-Gros.

=== Art and teaching career ===
He failed the prestigious Prix de Rome competition at the École six times, but he felt the problem was with the École, not himself. Couture finally did win the prize in 1837.

In 1840 he began exhibiting historical and genre pictures at the Paris Salon, earning several medals for his works, in particular for his masterpiece, Romans During the Decadence (1847). Shortly after this success, Couture opened an independent atelier meant to challenge the École des Beaux-Arts by turning out the best new history painters.

Couture's innovative technique gained much attention, and he received Government and Church commissions for murals during the late 1840s through the 1850s. He never completed the first two commissions, and the third met with mixed criticism. Upset by the unfavorable reception of his murals, in 1860 he left Paris, for a time returning to his hometown of Senlis, where he continued to teach young artists who came to him. In 1867 he thumbed his nose at the academic establishment by publishing a book on his own ideas and working methods called Méthode et entretiens d'atelier (Method and Workshop Interviews). It was also translated to Conversations on Art Methods in 1879, the year he died.

Asked by a publisher to write an autobiography, Couture responded: "Biography is the exaltation of personality—and personality is the scourge of our time."

=== Death ===
In 1879 he died at Villiers-le-Bel, Val-d'Oise, and was interred in Père Lachaise Cemetery, Paris.

== Selected paintings ==
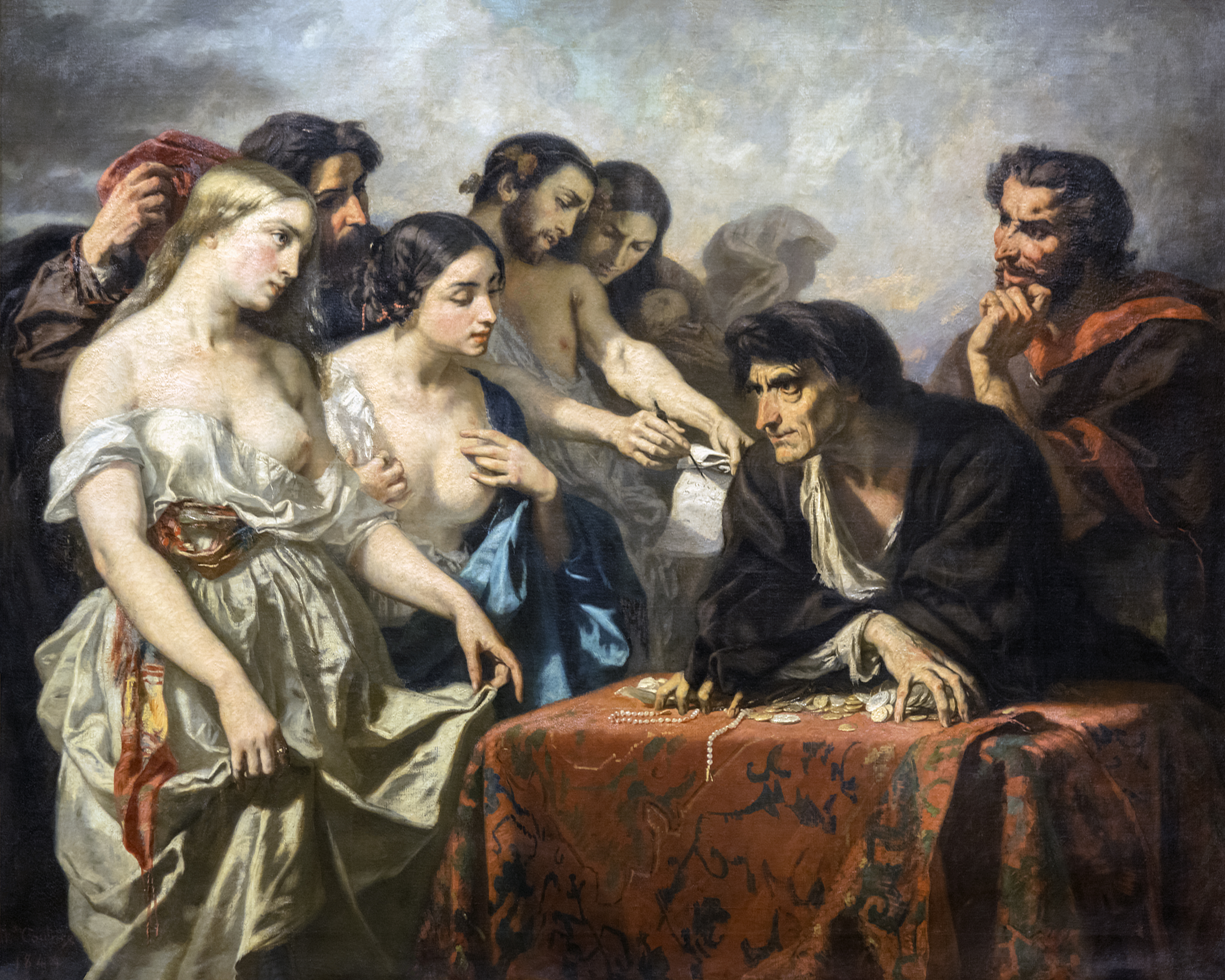
The Love of Gold, 1844

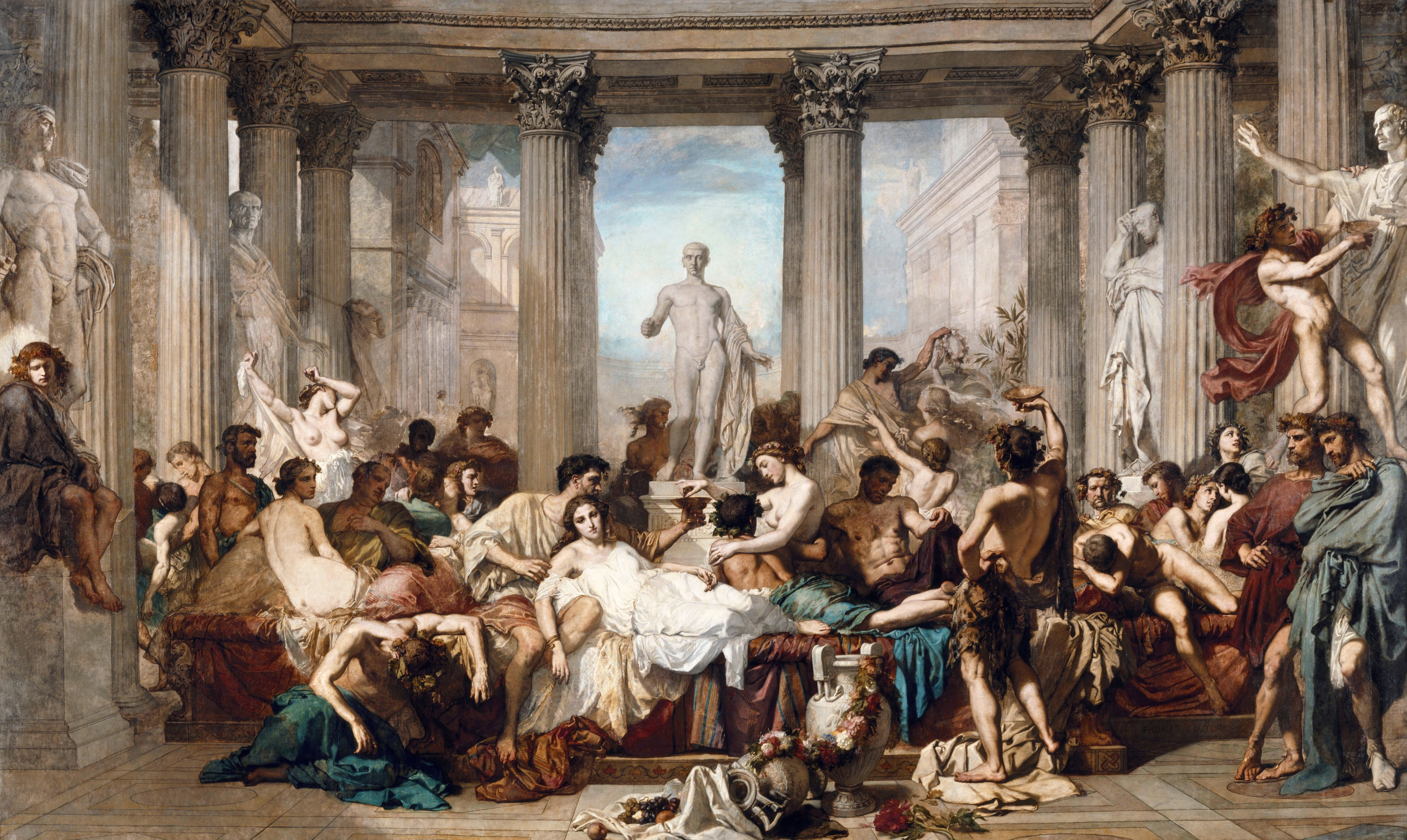
The Romans in their Decadence (1847)

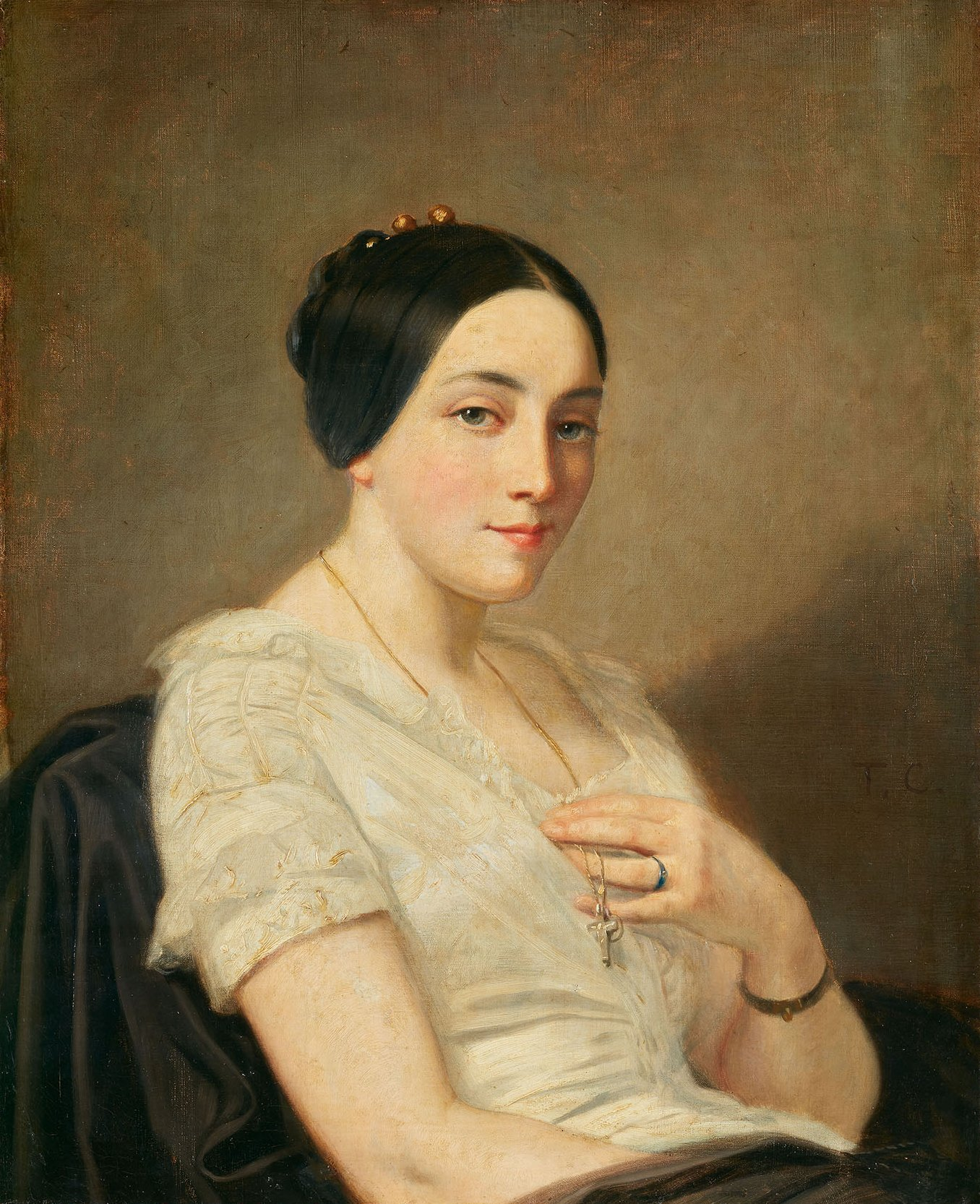
Portrait of a Seated Woman (1850-1855)

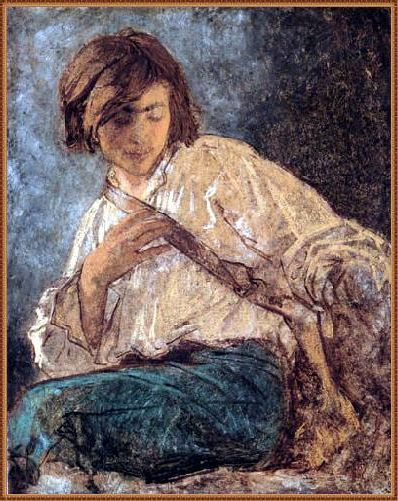
Anselm Feuerbach (1852)

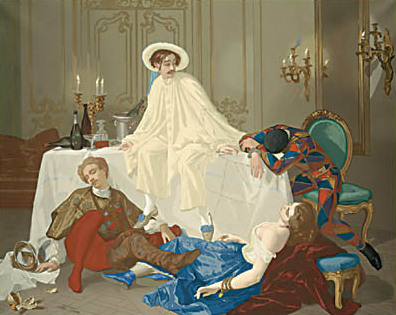
The Supper after the Masked Ball [1857]

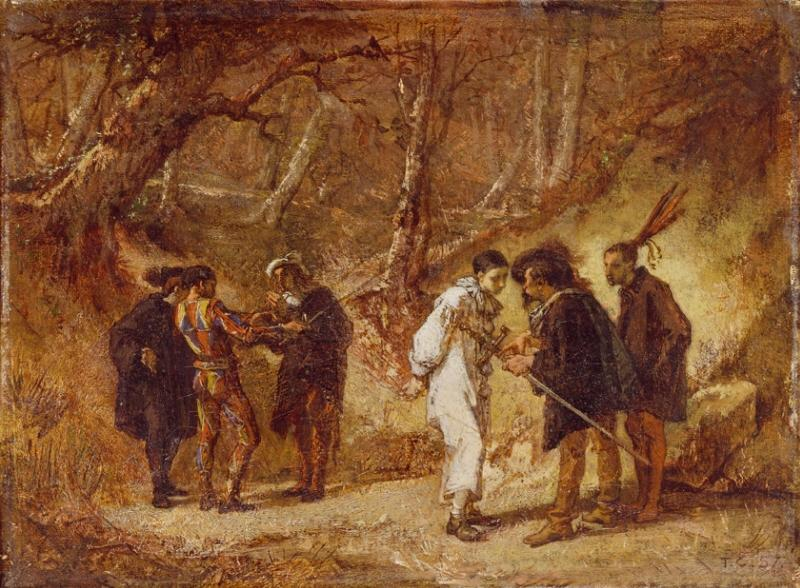
The Duel After the Masked Ball (1857)

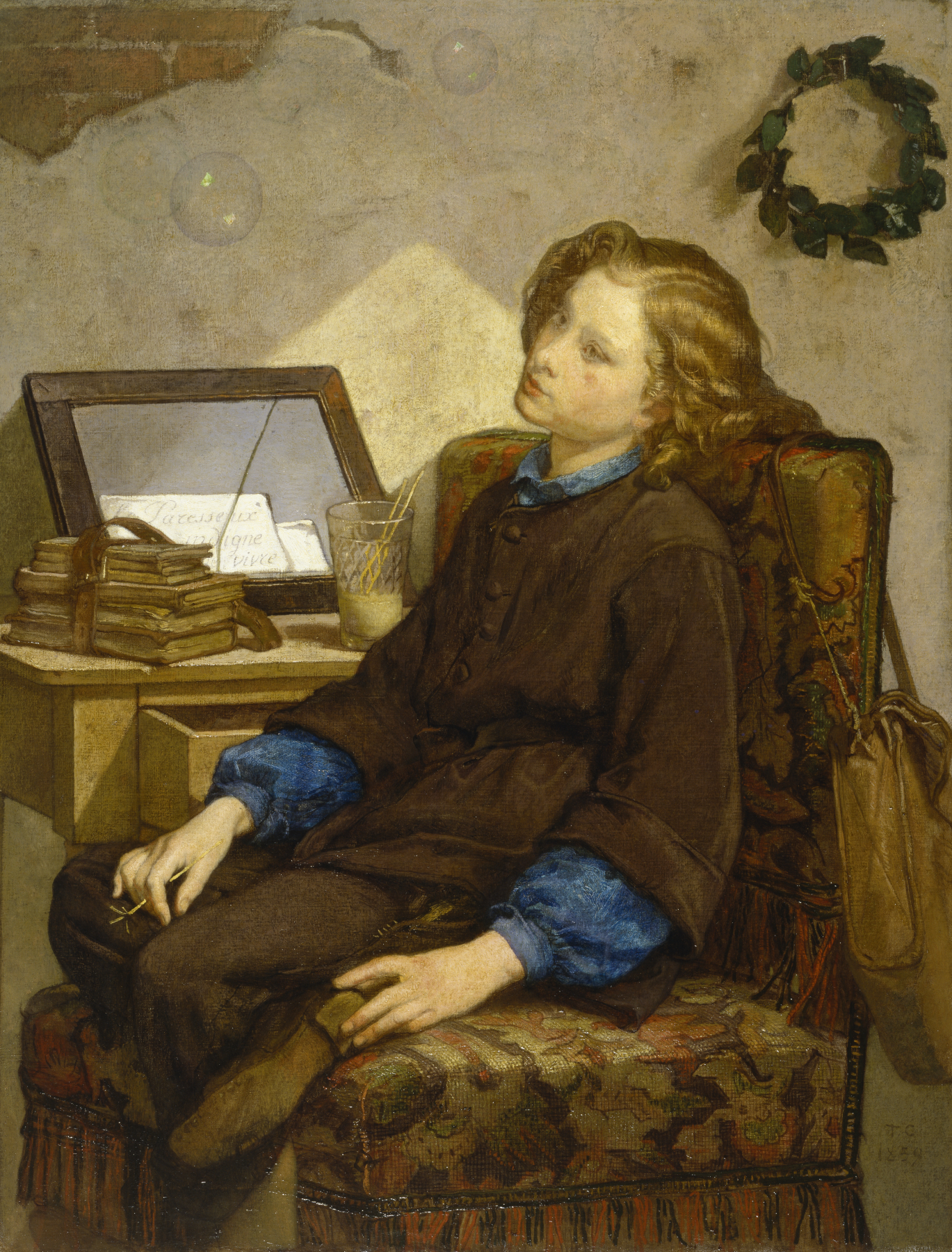
Daydreams (1859).

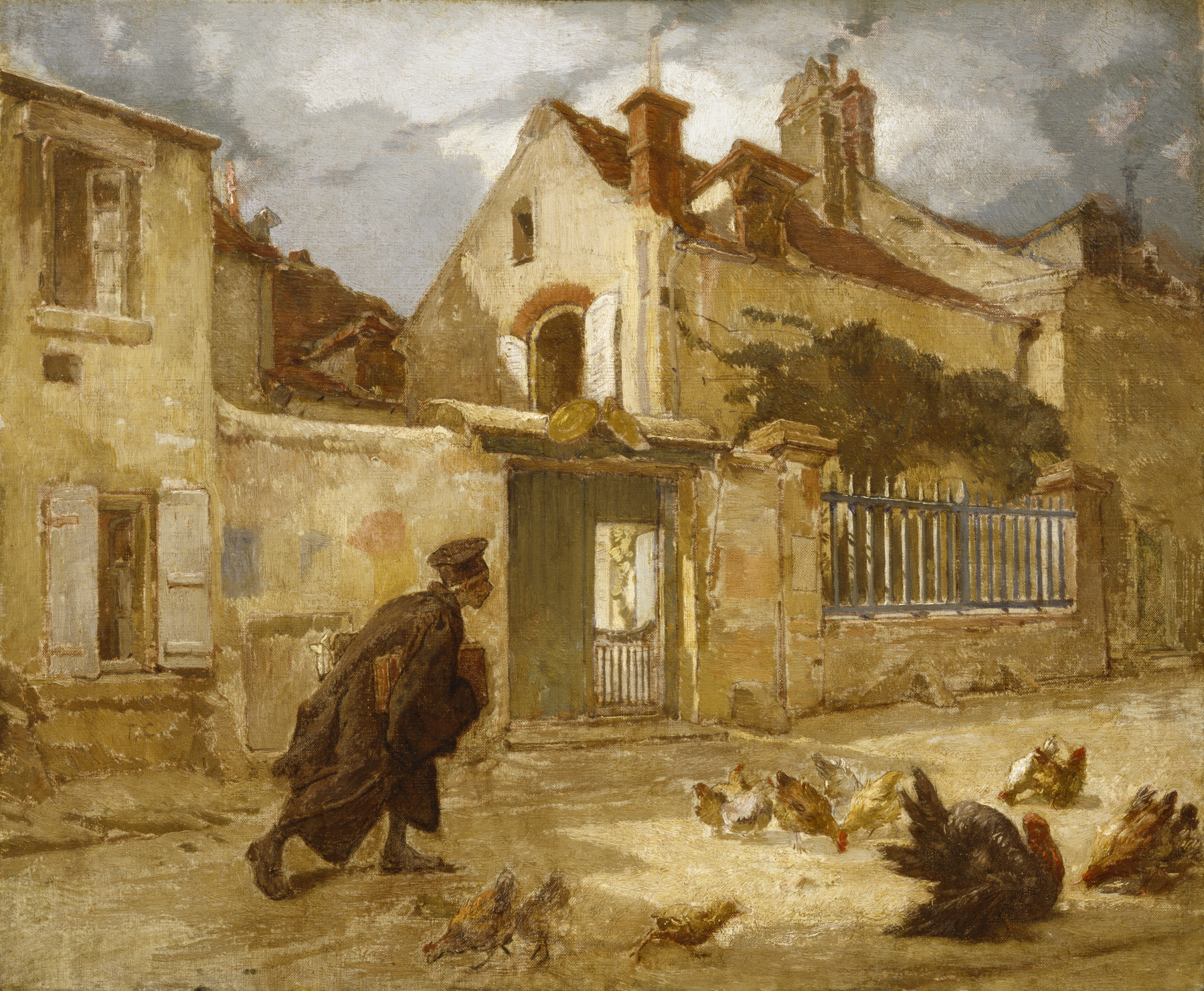
A Lawyer Going to Court (1860s)

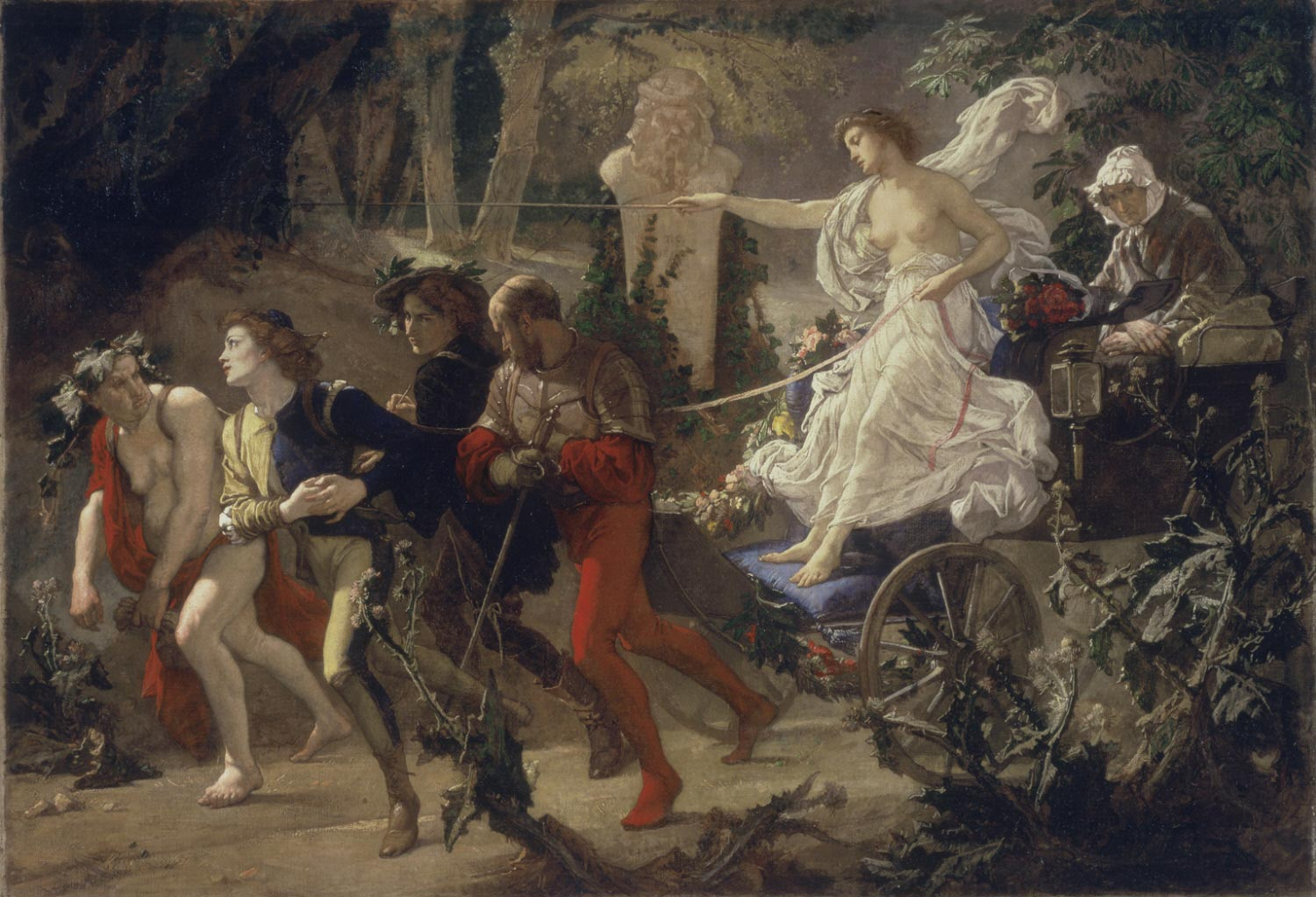
The Thorny Path (1872)

== Nazi-looted art in the Gurlitt collection ==
Couture’s Portrait of a Seated Woman, (c.1850-1855), discovered in the Gurlitt trove, was identified as having belonged to French politician Georges Mandel from a small hole in the canvas. It was restituted to Mandel's heirs in 2019.

== See also ==
- Villiers-le-Bel series
