= Hôtel de Ville, Villiers-le-Bel =

Town hall in Villiers-le-Bel, France

Hôtel de Ville
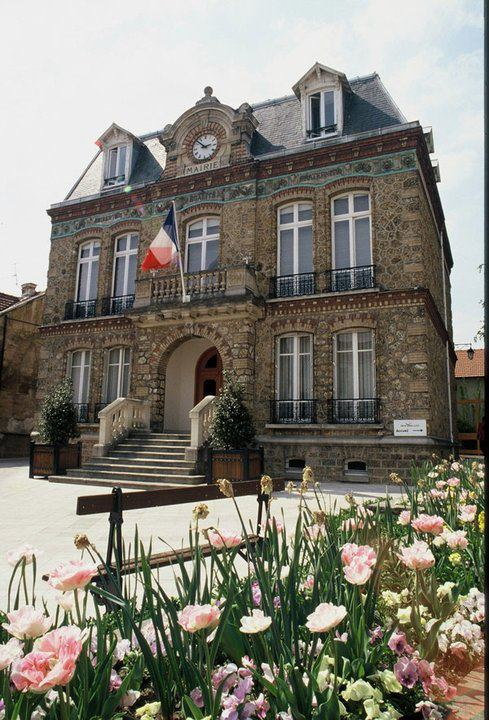
- The main frontage of the Hôtel de Ville in January 2012
- Interactive map of the Hôtel de Ville area

General information
- Type: City hall
- Architectural style: Neoclassical style
- Location: Villiers-le-Bel, France
- Coordinates: 49.0075°N 2.3879°E
- Completed: 1906

Design and construction
- Architect: Sieur Cabany

The Hôtel de Ville (French pronunciation: [otɛl də vil], City Hall) is a municipal building in Villiers-le-Bel, Val-d'Oise, in the northern suburbs of Paris, standing on Rue de la République.

== History ==
Following the French Revolution, the town council initially met at the house of the mayor at the time. This arrangement continued until the mid-19th century, when the council started using a room at the Charpentier Institution on the west side Rue de l'Aistre (now Rue de la République). The Charpentier Institution was a boarding school for boys which had been established at the instigation of Marie Pape-Carpantier in around 1850. The building consisted of a main block facing onto Rue de l'Aistre and two wings which were projected forward to form a courtyard. The building was occupied by Prussian troops in 1870 during the Franco-Prussian War and, due to its dilapidated condition, it was abandoned after the war.

In 1876, the council led by the mayor, Joseph Guerbigny, was granted permission to demolish the Charpentier Institution and to erect a combined town hall and school on the site. This was a modest building three-bay structure known as "L'hôtel de la Mairie".

Then in the early 20th century, the council led by the mayor, Germeuil Guerbigny, decided to demolish the combined town hall and school and to erect a more substantial town hall on the same site. The new building was designed by Sieur Cabany in the neoclassical style, built in millstone and was officially opened by the sub-prefect of the department, Georges Charles Winandy, on 27 May 1906.

The design involved a symmetrical main frontage of five bays facing onto the street. The central bay featured a short flight of steps leading up to a porch with a round-headed opening and voussoirs. On the first floor, there was a segmental headed French door with a balustraded balcony. The other bays were fenestrated by segmental headed windows on both floors. At roof level, there was a clock with a semi-circular surround and a finial above the central bay and a pair of dormer windows. Internally, the principal rooms were the Salle des Mariages (wedding room) and the Salle de Conseil (council chamber) on the first floor of the building.

An extension, built behind the town hall in concrete and glass at a cost of €4.1 million, to a design by Graal Architects, was completed in June 2023. The design involved a long two-storey block set behind the original building. The section to the south featured a series of columns supporting the first-floor structure, so allowing vehicle access underneath, while the section to the north featured a glass fronted entrance on the ground floor, so allowing pedestrian access. On the first floor, both sections were faced with vertical ceramic strips in shades of grey and fenestrated by a series of lancet windows.
