= The Romans in their Decadence =

1847 painting by Thomas Couture

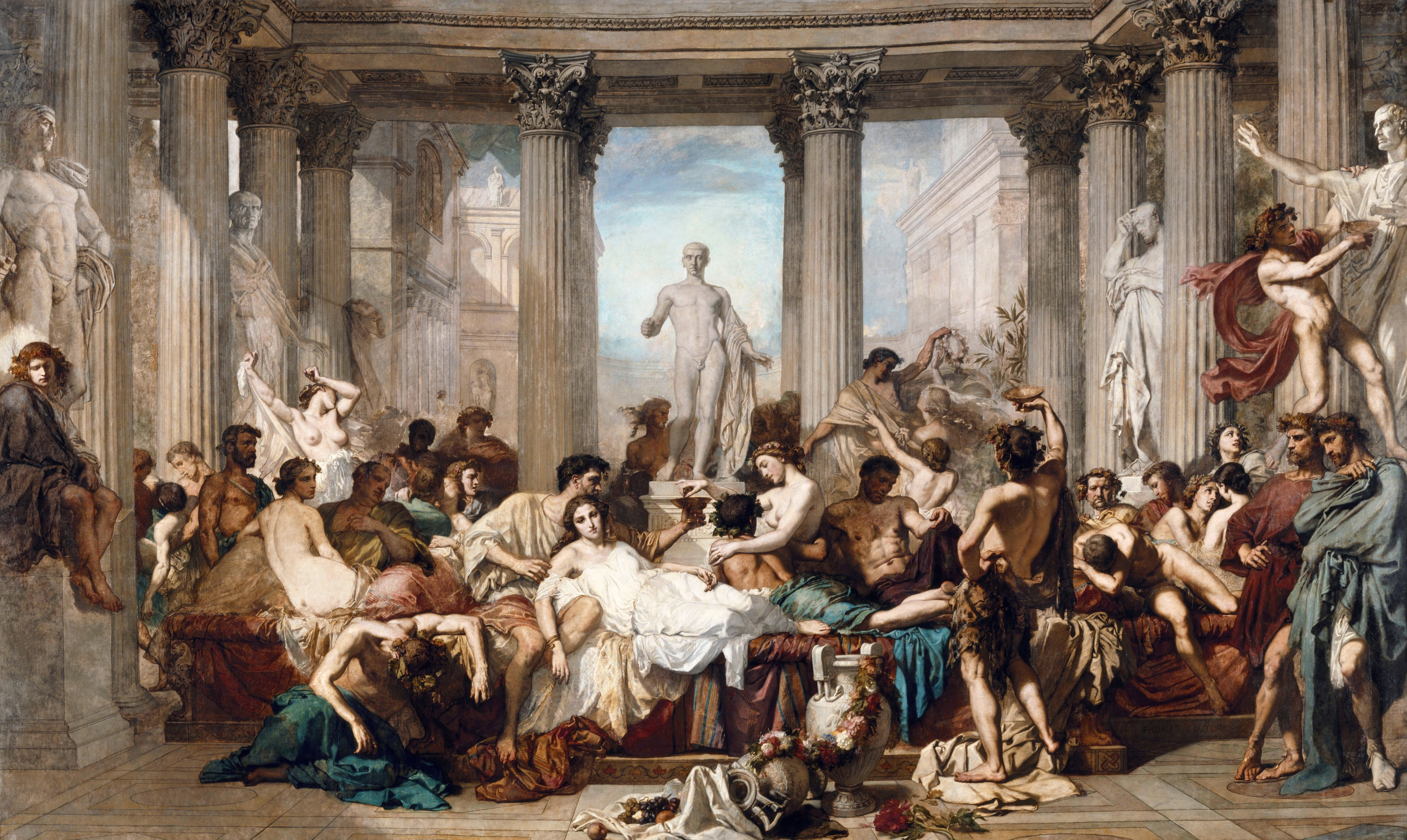
The Romans in their Decadence

The Romans in their Decadence (French: Les Romains de la décadence, also translated as Romans During the Decadence or Romans in the Decadence of the Empire) is a painting by the French artist Thomas Couture, depicting the Roman decadence. It debuted as the most highly acclaimed work of the Paris Salon of 1847, a year before the 1848 Revolution which toppled the July Monarchy. Reminiscent of the style of Raphael, it is typical of the French 'classic' style between 1850 and 1900 today analyzed within the wider current of academic art.

The exhibition catalogue included a quote from the poet Juvenal: Nunc patimur longae pacis mala; savior armis Luxuria incubuit, victumque ulciscitur orbem. ("Now do we suffer the evils of prolonged peace; luxury more ruthless than the sword broods over us, and avenges a conquered world." A picture of Rome in its decline.)

It now belongs to the Musée d'Orsay in Paris. It was etched by Edmond Hédouin (1820–1889).

== Description ==
Couture's composition depicts the perceived moral and political decline of the later Roman Empire through the inebriated and exhausted aftermath of a large orgy, contrasting the weakness and degeneracy of its participants against the statues of gods or emperors proudly displayed around the classical Roman architecture of the painting's setting. Some figures continue to dance among the reclining mass while one man at the right drunkenly addresses a statue, disrespectfully hanging from its arm. Only three appear to have avoided participating in the orgy, consisting of one figure seated contemplatively upon a plinth to the left, and two upright men overlooking the scene from the right.

The painting is noted for its subdued use of color and its depiction of the human body.

== Reception ==
The Romans in their Decadence was one of the two most critically successful works to be exhibited at the salon that year, alongside Woman Bitten by a Serpent. Renowned critic Théophile Gautier compared the realism of the painting to styles practiced in Northern Europe at the time rather than Couture's native France, while Edmond Texier praised aspects of the work but ultimately considered the painting's scope insufficient to capture the tragedy and dishonor of the era. The future Napoleon III considered the painting's message an attack on the republic and brutally condemned the work.
