= Lycée Pierre Mendès France (Villiers-le-Bel) =

Vocational senior high school in France

== Description ==
Lycée professionnel Pierre Mendès France is a polyvalent (multi-purpose) high school (and was a vocational senior high school before). It is situated in Villiers-le-Bel, Val-d'Oise, France, in the Paris metropolitan area.

The school is located in the north of the Carreaux neighbourhood, near Gonesse.

In September 2023, it becomes a multi-purpose school, with the construction of a new building to be inaugurated on January 30, 2024.

== Buildings ==
The school has three main buildings, designated A, B and C respectively. Building A, the oldest, was first used for vocational education, but has also been used for general education since the beginning of September 2023. In December of the same year, Building A ceased to be used for general courses (with a few exceptions), and is now dedicated exclusively to vocational education and teachers' rooms.

Building B contains a variety of workshops dedicated to vocational training; however, it has significant defects and deterioration requiring immediate attention.

Building C, the most recent, opened in December 2023, currently hosts general education students on the second floor. Plans are underway to integrate some vocational classes on the second floor in the near future.
