= Edmond Eugène Valton =

French painter

Edmond-Eugène Valton (French pronunciation: [ɛdmɔ̃ øʒɛn valtɔ̃]; September 25, 1836 in Paris – September 1910), French painter, draughtsman and illustrator. He studied with Felix Fossey (1826–1895), and at the École des Beaux Arts, under Célestin Nanteuil (1813–1873), Paul Delaroche (1797–1856), Merry-Joseph Blondel (1781–1853) David d'Angers (1788–1856) and Thomas Couture (1815–1879). He was one of the founder members of the Société des Artistes Indépendants in 1904 and in 1909 president.

For Valton drawing was perhaps the most important artistic discipline. He was an art teacher at the École Germain Pilon (the future École des Arts Appliqués). Among his students was Marcel L'Enfant. He was the author of three books about drawing.

Valton documented with the classical artistic language the changes that industrialisation had brought into his world. With a modern language, he recorded the endangered and almost metaphysical landscapes of the Île-de-France.

== Selected work ==
- Musée d’Orsay, (oil on canvas Portrait of Thomas Couture), in the National Gallery of Art in Washington, (drawing, The Scholar)
- Institut de France (51 drawings for illustrations to fables of Jean de La Fontaine (1621–1695))
- Museum Grey (oil on canvas Les Halles)
- Museum Longwy, (oil on canvas The Harvest).
- Croatian private collection (sixty-seven drawings drawn between 1871 and 1910).
