= Lycée Jean Jacques Rousseau (Sarcelles) =

Senior high school in France

Lycée Jean Jacques Rousseau is a senior high school/sixth-form college in Sarcelles, Val-d'Oise, France, in the Paris metropolitan area.

It was originally an annex of the Lycée de Montmorency that opened in October 1960 but it became independent in January 1965 and moved to its current location in October 1966. As of 2016 it has 1,735 students.

As of 2007 students from Villiers-le-Bel attending general high school studies go to Rousseau, because Villiers-le-Bel does not have its own general high school.

== History ==
Throughout the decades the student population increased, from 1,600 students in 1975 to 2,400 students in 1989. The school had insufficient agents de service by the 1990s, with only an increase from 49 agents in 1975 to over 30 agents in 1989, and then a decrease to 28.5 positions in 1994.

By 2016 the school had 1,800 students. That year employees of the French offices of Deloitte provided assistance to the school.

15 students who engaged in a playwriting workshop were featured in the documentary Changer de regard; they were in the level prèmiere ES (equivalent to the U.S. 11th grade or the British first year of sixth-form college).
