= Villiers-le-Bel =

- Commune
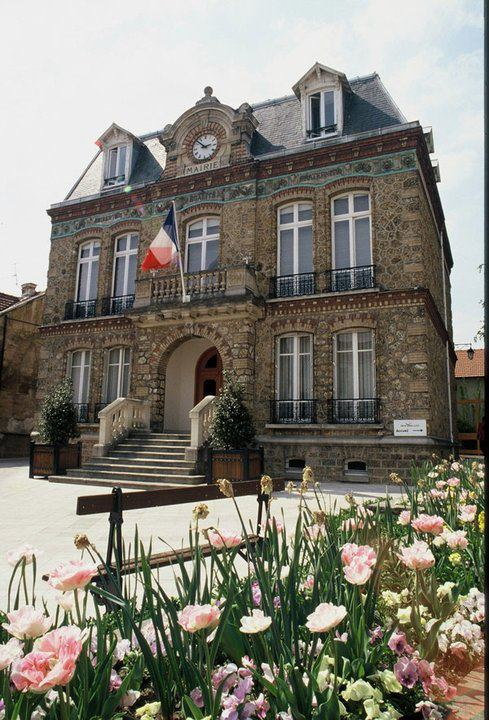
- The Hôtel de Ville

- Coat of arms

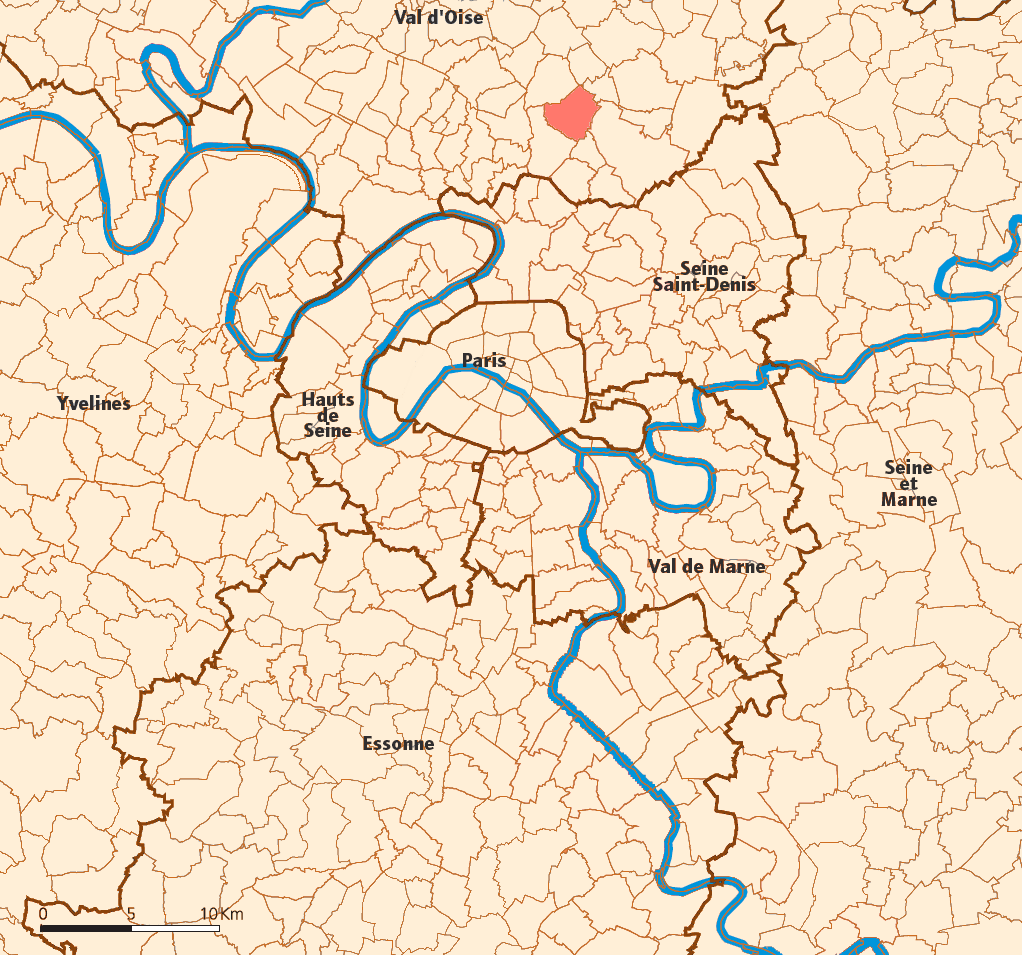
- Location (in red) within Paris inner and outer suburbs
- Location of Villiers-le-Bel
- Location within France Location within Île-de-France (region)
- Coordinates: 49°00′34″N 2°23′28″E
- Country: France
- Region: Île-de-France
- Department: Val-d'Oise
- Arrondissement: Sarcelles
- Canton: Villiers-le-Bel
- Intercommunality: CA Roissy Pays de France

Government
  - Mayor (2024–2026): Djida Djalalli-Techtach
- Area^{1}: 7.3 km^{2} (2.8 sq mi)
- Elevation: 75 m (246 ft)
- Highest elevation: 147 m (482 ft)
- Lowest elevation: 64 m (210 ft)
- Population (2023): 30,053
  - Density: 4,100/km^{2} (11,000/sq mi)
- Time zone: UTC+01:00 (CET)
  - Summer (DST): UTC+02:00 (CEST)
- INSEE/Postal code: 95680 /95400
- ^{1} French Land Register data, which excludes lakes, ponds, glaciers > 1 km^{2} (0.386 sq mi or 247 acres) and river estuaries.

Villiers-le-Bel (French pronunciation: [vilje lə bɛl]) is a commune in the French department of Val-d'Oise, in the northern suburbs of Paris. It is located 17.4 km (10.8 mi) from the center of Paris.

== History ==
A tragedy occurred in the town in the early evening of March 25, 1818, when a cracked 6,000 pound (2721 kg) bell being removed from a belfry came crashing down, killing approximately 25 onlookers. Workers who remained hanging from the collapsed steeple were able to be rescued.

The Hôtel de Ville was completed in 1906.

In the 1950s the commune had about 5,000 residents but it urbanized from 1950 to 1974. As of 2007 the commune had 26,000 people.

In 2007 the mayor at the time, François Pupponi, stated that the city became a "social ghetto" suffered from planning errors made in the 1950s, as the community did not gain the businesses necessary to support the population. Jean-Louis Marsac, the first deputy mayor, stated that the commune grew without gaining the proper infrastructure.

=== 2007 riots ===
On the night of 25 November 2007, gangs attacked a police station in Villiers-le-Bel, torched cars, and vandalized stores. The violence was prompted by the deaths of two adolescents after a crash between their motorbike and a police patrol car at an intersection. The disturbances spread to neighbouring towns on the night of 26 November. 82 police officers were injured, four of them seriously, by shotgun blasts.

== Transport ==
The Paris Métro, RER, serves through the Villiers-le-Bel - Gonesse - Arnouville station on Paris RER line D. However, this station is located in the neighboring commune of Arnouville-lès-Gonesse, 2.5 km (1.6 mi) from the town center of Villiers-le-Bel.

== Population ==
Historical population

Year	Pop.	±% p.a.
1793	1,633	—
1800	1,350	−2.68%
1806	1,325	−0.31%
1821	1,178	−0.78%
1831	1,209	+0.26%
1836	1,322	+1.80%
1841	1,883	+7.33%
1846	1,979	+1.00%
1851	1,934	−0.46%
1856	1,951	+0.18%
1861	2,132	+1.79%
1866	2,107	−0.24%
1872	1,735	−3.19%
1876	1,968	+3.20%
1881	2,016	+0.48%
1886	1,968	−0.48%
1891	1,649	−3.48%
1896	1,644	−0.06%
1901	1,723	+0.94%

Year	Pop.	±% p.a.
1906	1,718	−0.06%
1911	1,845	+1.44%
1921	2,377	+2.57%
1926	3,324	+6.94%
1931	4,389	+5.72%
1936	4,351	−0.17%
1946	4,209	−0.33%
1954	4,852	+1.79%
1962	12,797	+12.89%
1968	19,119	+6.92%
1975	21,876	+1.94%
1982	24,808	+1.81%
1990	26,110	+0.64%
1999	26,145	+0.01%
2007	27,091	+0.45%
2012	27,496	+0.30%
2017	27,676	+0.13%
2023	30,053	+1.38%

Source: EHESS and INSEE (1968–2023)

== Age distribution ==
As of 2023 41% of the commune's population was under the age of 25.

Population by age of Villiers-le-Bel, 2023 (%)

80+	2.2
65–79	7.9
55–64	10
40–54	18.6
25–39	20.7
15–24	14.5
0–14	26

Total: 99.9

male

female

Source: INSEE

Population by age of Val-d'Oise, 2023 (%)

90+	3.8
75–89	10.6
60–74	11.4
45–59	19.9
30–44	20.1
15–29	13.1
0–14	21.2

Total: 100.1

male

female

Source: INSEE

== Economy ==
As of 2007 Charles de Gaulle International Airport is the primary employer of the area. Within Villiers-le-Bel itself the largest employers were the Charles-Richet Hospital, the Flopak conditioning company, Gilson medical material company, and public services.

== Education ==
The commune has 30 educational institutions, including 11 preschools and 11 elementary schools along with four junior high schools and a vocational high school. As of 2007 the commune does not have its own general high school/sixth-form college.

- Junior high schools include Collège Léon Blum, Collège Martin Luther King, and Collège Saint Exupéry along with the private Collège privé Saint Didier
- Lycée Mendès France (vocational high school) is in the commune

Two nearby senior high schools are in Sarcelles, Lycée la tourelle and Lycée Jean Jacques Rousseau. Students attending general high school studies go to J. J. Rousseau.

Area universities:

- Université de Cergy-Pontoise
- University of Paris 8
- University of Paris 13

== Neighboring communes ==
- Arnouville-lès-Gonesse
- Bouqueval
- Écouen
- Le Plessis-Gassot
- Gonesse
- Sarcelles

== Personalities ==
- Alexandre Beljame (1842–1906), writer.
- Mickael Citony footballer
- Marie-Laure Delie footballer
- Gaël N’Lundulu footballer
- Yoann Salmier, footballer
- Kevin Vinetot footballer
- Lino rapper
- Mike Maignan footballer

== See also ==
- Communes of the Val-d'Oise department
- Villiers-le-Bel series
