= Charles Baudelaire =

French poet and critic (1821–1867)

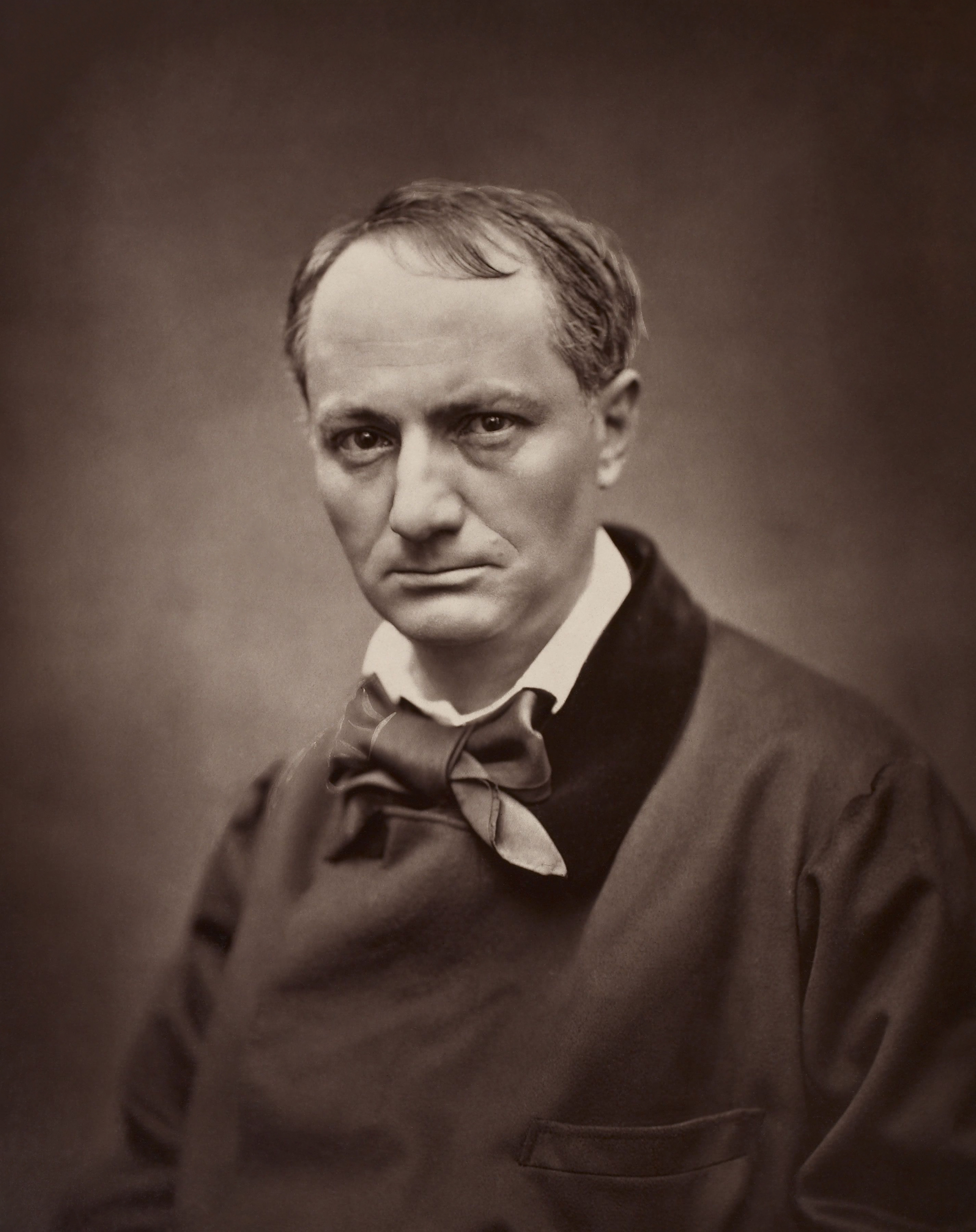
- Baudelaire c. 1862
- Born: Charles-Pierre Baudelaire; 9 April 1821; Paris, France
- Died: 31 August 1867 (aged 46); Paris, France
- Education: Lycée Louis-le-Grand
- Occupations: Poet, art critic, philosopher
- Writing career
- Period: 1844–1867
- Movement: Decadent

Charles-Pierre Baudelaire (UK: /ˈboʊdəlɛər/; US: /ˌboʊd(ə)ˈlɛər/; French: [ʃaʁl(ə) bodlɛʁ]; 9 April 1821 – 31 August 1867) was a French poet, essayist, translator and art critic. His poems are described as exhibiting mastery of rhythm and rhyme, containing an exoticism inherited from the Romantics, and are based on observations of real life.

His most famous work, a book of lyric poetry titled Les Fleurs du mal (The Flowers of Evil), expresses the changing nature of beauty in the rapidly industrialising Paris caused by Haussmann's renovation of Paris during the mid-19th century. Baudelaire's original style of prose-poetry influenced a generation of poets including Paul Verlaine, Arthur Rimbaud and Stéphane Mallarmé. He coined the term modernity (modernité) to designate the fleeting experience of life in an urban metropolis, and the responsibility of artistic expression to capture that experience. Marshall Berman has credited Baudelaire as being the first Modernist.

== Early life ==
Baudelaire was born in Paris, France, on 9 April 1821, and baptized two months later at Saint-Sulpice Catholic church. His father, Joseph-François Baudelaire, was a senior civil servant and amateur artist, who at 60, was 34 years older than Baudelaire's 26-year-old mother, Caroline (née Dufaÿs); she was his second wife.

Joseph-François died during Baudelaire's childhood, at rue Hautefeuille, Paris, on 10 February 1827. The following year, Caroline married Lieutenant Colonel Jacques Aupick, who later became a French ambassador to various noble courts.

Baudelaire's biographers have often seen this as a crucial moment, considering that finding himself no longer the sole focus of his mother's affection left him with a trauma, which goes some way to explaining the excesses later apparent in his life. He stated in a letter to her that, "There was in my childhood a period of passionate love for you." Baudelaire regularly begged his mother for money throughout his career, often promising that a lucrative publishing contract or journalistic commission was just around the corner.

Baudelaire was educated in Lyon, where he boarded. At 14, he was described by a classmate as "much more refined and distinguished than any of our fellow pupils ... we are bound to one another ... by shared tastes and sympathies, the precocious love of fine works of literature."

Baudelaire was erratic in his studies, at times diligent, at other times prone to "idleness". Later, he attended the Lycée Louis-le-Grand in Paris, studying law, a popular course for those not yet decided on any particular career. He began to frequent prostitutes and may have contracted gonorrhea and syphilis during this period. He also began to run up debts, mostly for clothes.

Upon gaining his degree in 1839, he told his brother "I don't feel I have a vocation for anything." His stepfather had in mind a career in law or diplomacy, but instead Baudelaire decided to embark upon a literary career. His mother later recalled: "Oh, what grief! If Charles had let himself be guided by his stepfather, his career would have been very different ... He would not have left a name in literature, it is true, but we should have been happier, all three of us."

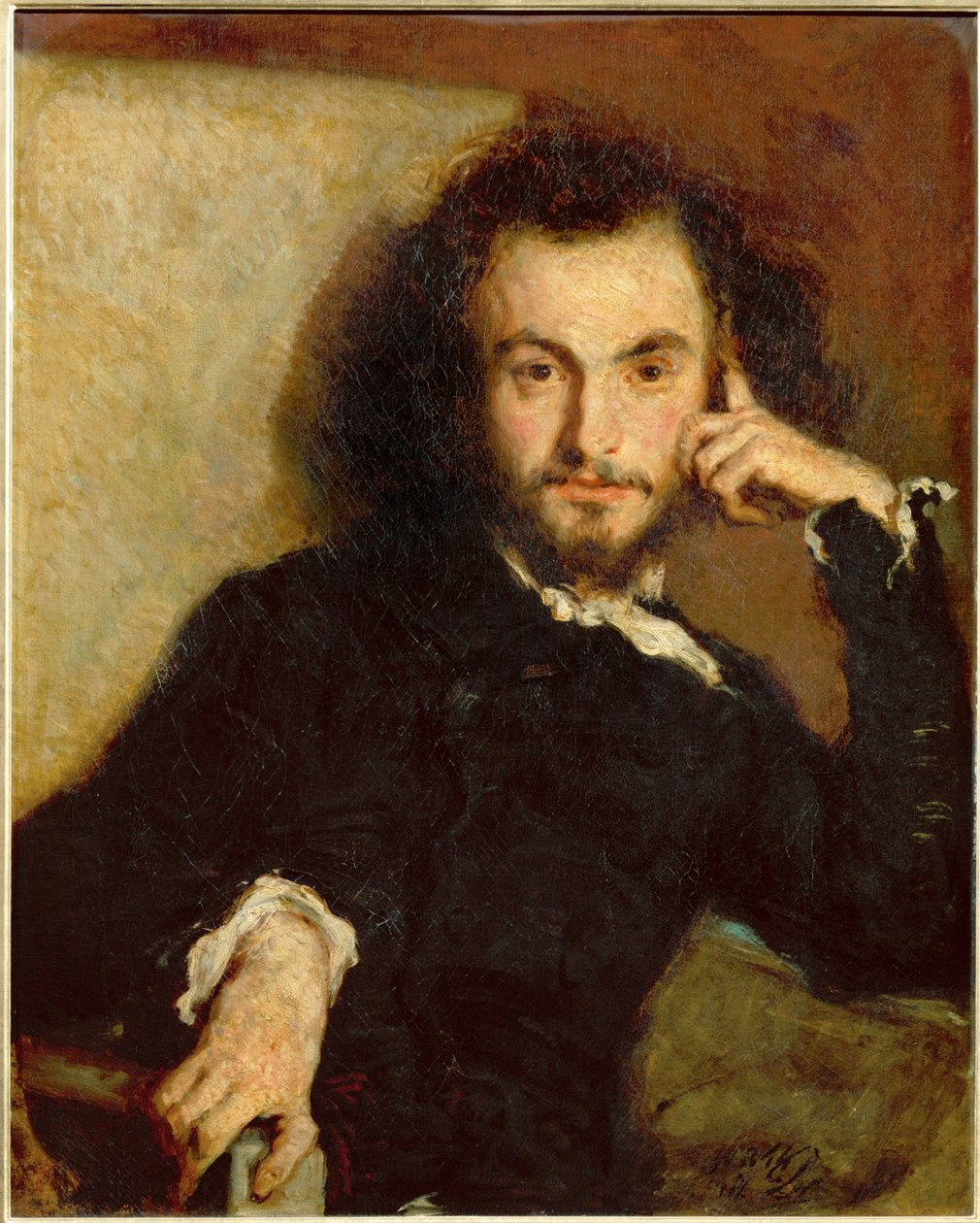
Portrait of Baudelaire at 23 years old, painted in 1844 by Émile Deroy (1820–1846)

His stepfather sent him on a voyage to Calcutta, India in 1841 in the hope of ending his dissolute habits. The trip provided strong impressions of the sea, sailing, and exotic ports, that he later employed in his poetry. Baudelaire did not make it to India, but ended his voyage and returned to Paris after a few weeks stopped on the islands of Mauritius and Réunion. Baudelaire later exaggerated his aborted trip to create a legend about his youthful travels and experiences, including "riding on elephants".

On returning to the taverns of Paris, he began to compose some of the poems of Les Fleurs du Mal. At 21, he received a sizable inheritance but squandered much of it within a few years. His family obtained a decree to place his property in trust, which he resented bitterly, at one point arguing that allowing him to fail financially would have been the one sure way of teaching him to keep his finances in order.

Baudelaire became known in artistic circles as a dandy and free-spender, going through much of his inheritance and allowance in a short period of time. During this time, Jeanne Duval, a French-born actress, became his mistress. She was rejected by his family. His mother thought Duval a "Black Venus" who "tortured him in every way" and drained him of money at every opportunity. Baudelaire made a suicide attempt during this period.

He took part in the Revolutions of 1848 and wrote for a revolutionary newspaper. However, his interest in politics was passing, as he was later to note in his journals.

In the early 1850s, Baudelaire struggled with poor health, pressing debts, and irregular literary output. He often moved from one lodging to another to escape creditors. He undertook many projects that he was unable to complete, though he did finish translations of stories by Edgar Allan Poe.

Upon the death of his stepfather in 1857, Baudelaire received no mention in the will but he was heartened nonetheless that the division with his mother might now be mended. At 36, he wrote to her: "believe that I belong to you absolutely, and that I belong only to you." His mother died on 16 August 1871, outliving her son by almost four years.

== Publishing career ==
His first published work, under the pseudonym Baudelaire Dufaÿs, was his art review "Salon of 1845", which attracted immediate attention for its boldness. Many of his critical opinions were novel in their time, including his championing of Delacroix, and some of his views seem remarkably in tune with the future theories of the Impressionist painters.

In 1846, Baudelaire wrote his second Salon review, gaining additional credibility as an advocate and critic of Romanticism. His continued support of Delacroix as the foremost Romantic artist gained widespread notice. The following year Baudelaire's novella La Fanfarlo was published.

=== The Flowers of Evil ===
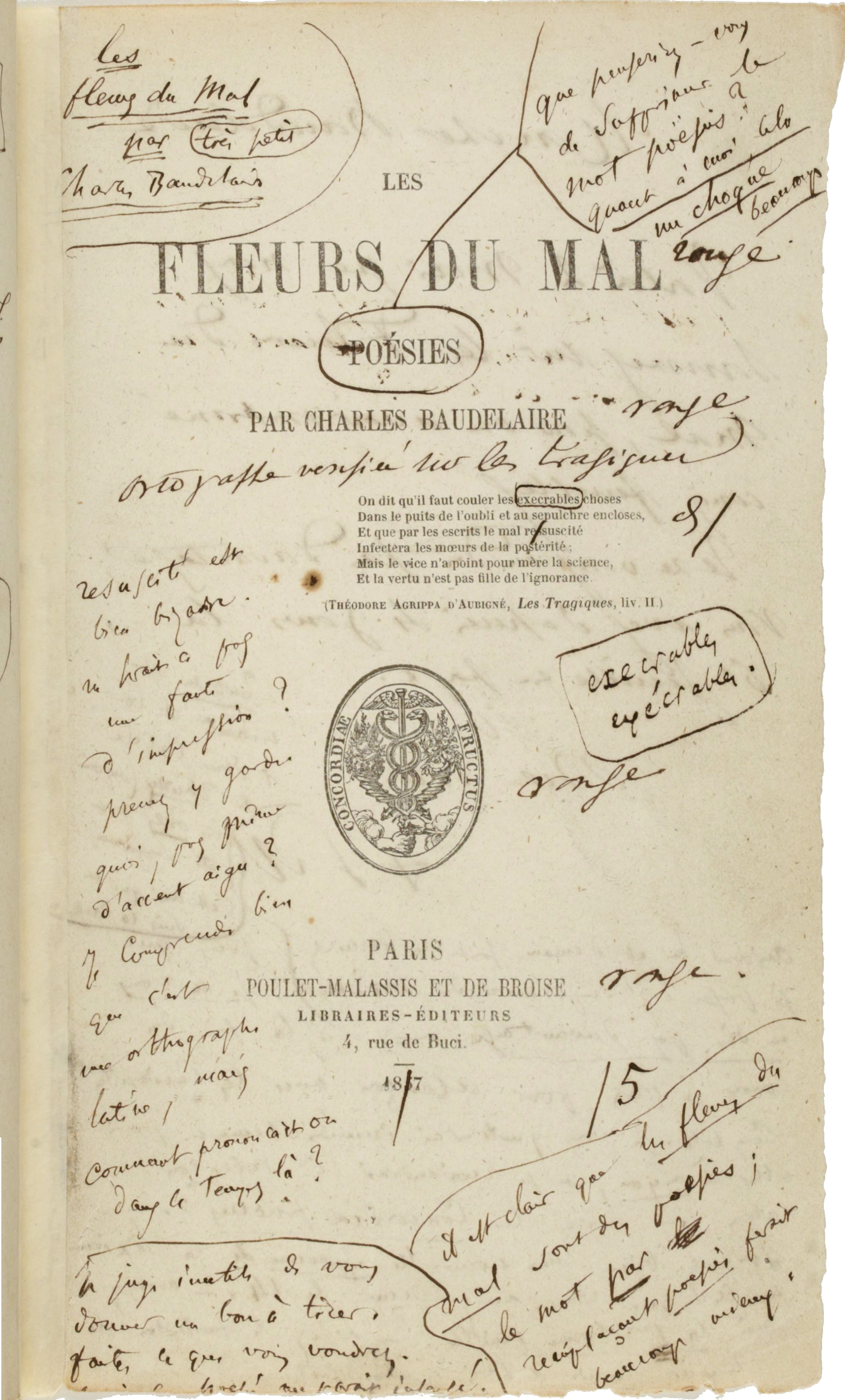
The first edition of Les Fleurs du mal with author's notes

Baudelaire was a slow and very attentive worker. However, he often was sidetracked by indolence, emotional distress and illness, and it was not until 1857 that he published Les Fleurs du mal (The Flowers of Evil), his first and most famous volume of poems. Some of these poems had already appeared in the Revue des deux mondes (Review of Two Worlds) in 1855, when they were published by Baudelaire's friend Auguste Poulet-Malassis. Some of the poems had appeared as "fugitive verse" in various French magazines during the previous decade.

The poems found a small, yet appreciative audience. However, greater public attention was given to their subject matter. The effect on fellow artists was, as Théodore de Banville stated, "immense, prodigious, unexpected, mingled with admiration and with some indefinable anxious fear". Gustave Flaubert, having recently been attacked in a similar fashion for Madame Bovary (and acquitted), was impressed and wrote to Baudelaire: "You have found a way to rejuvenate Romanticism...You are as unyielding as marble, and as penetrating as an English mist."

The principal themes of sex and death were considered scandalous for the period. He also touched on lesbianism, sacred and profane love, metamorphosis, melancholy, the corruption of the city, lost innocence, the oppressiveness of living, and wine. Notable in some poems is Baudelaire's use of imagery of the sense of smell and of fragrances, which is used to evoke feelings of nostalgia and past intimacy.

The book, however, quickly became a byword for unwholesomeness among mainstream critics of the day. Some critics called a few of the poems "masterpieces of passion, art and poetry," but other poems were deemed to merit no less than legal action to suppress them. J. Habas led the charge against Baudelaire, writing in Le Figaro: "Everything in it which is not hideous is incomprehensible, everything one understands is putrid." Baudelaire responded to the outcry in a prophetic letter to his mother:

"You know that I have always considered that literature and the arts pursue an aim independent of morality. Beauty of conception and style is enough for me. But this book, whose title (Fleurs du mal) says everything, is clad, as you will see, in a cold and sinister beauty. It was created with rage and patience. Besides, the proof of its positive worth is in all the ill that they speak of it. The book enrages people. Moreover, since I was terrified myself of the horror that I should inspire, I cut out a third from the proofs. They deny me everything, the spirit of invention and even the knowledge of the French language. I don't care a rap about all these imbeciles, and I know that this book, with its virtues and its faults, will make its way in the memory of the lettered public, beside the best poems of V. Hugo, Th. Gautier and even Byron."

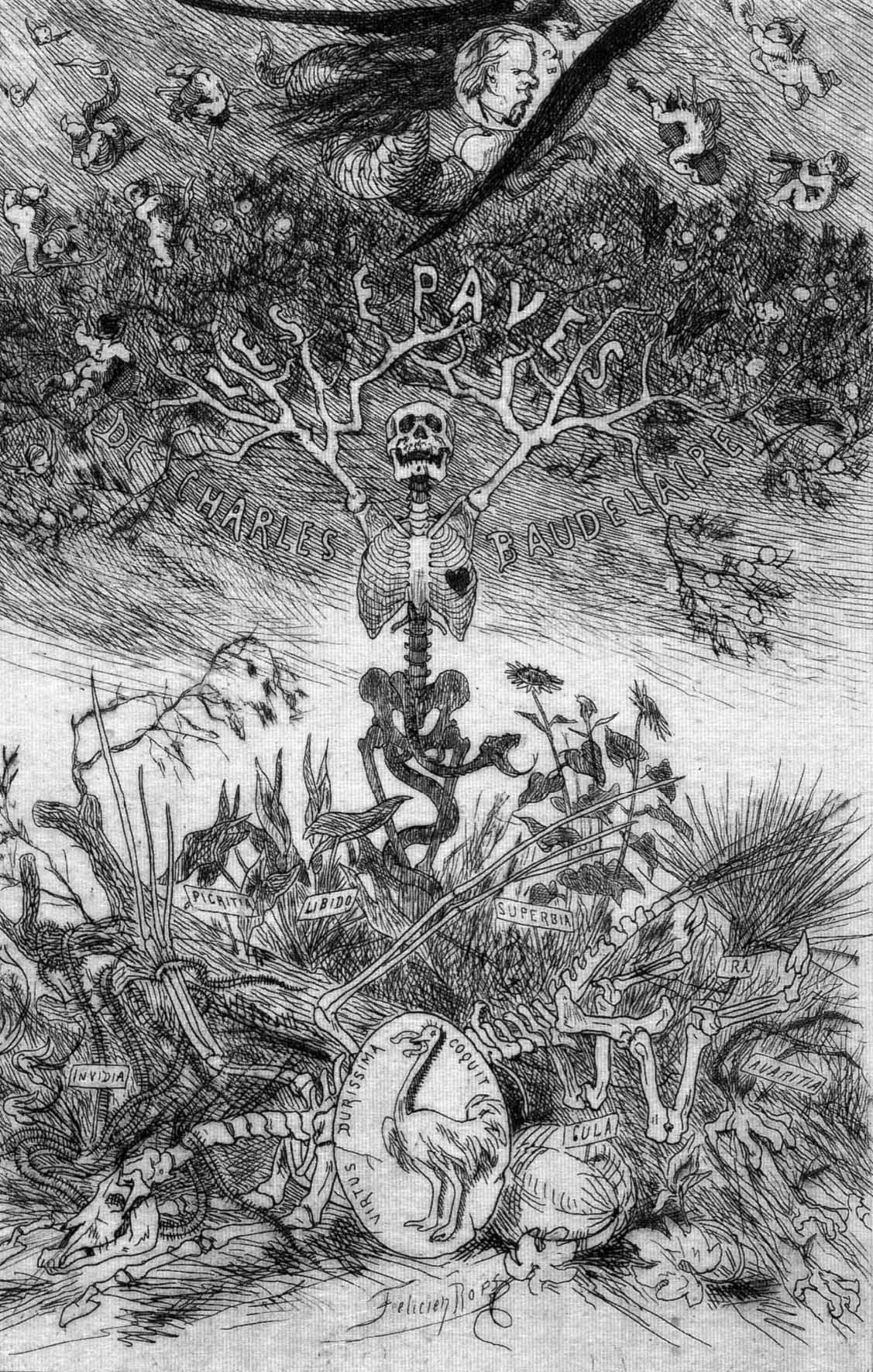
Illustration cover for Les Épaves, by Baudelaire's friend Félicien Rops

Baudelaire, his publisher and the printer were successfully prosecuted for creating an offense against public morals. They were fined, but Baudelaire was not imprisoned. Six of the poems were suppressed, but printed later as Les Épaves (The Wrecks) (Brussels, 1866). Another edition of Les Fleurs du mal, without these poems, but with considerable additions, appeared in 1861. Many notables rallied behind Baudelaire and condemned the sentence. Victor Hugo wrote to him: "Your fleurs du mal shine and dazzle like stars...I applaud your vigorous spirit with all my might." Baudelaire did not appeal the judgment, but his fine was reduced. Nearly 100 years later, on 11 May 1949, Baudelaire was vindicated, the judgment officially reversed, and the six banned poems reinstated in France.

In the poem "Au lecteur" ("To the Reader") that prefaces Les Fleurs du mal, Baudelaire accuses his readers of hypocrisy and of being as guilty of sins and lies as the poet:

... If rape or arson, poison or the knife
Has wove no pleasing patterns in the stuff
Of this drab canvas we accept as life—
It is because we are not bold enough!

(Roy Campbell's translation)

== Final years ==
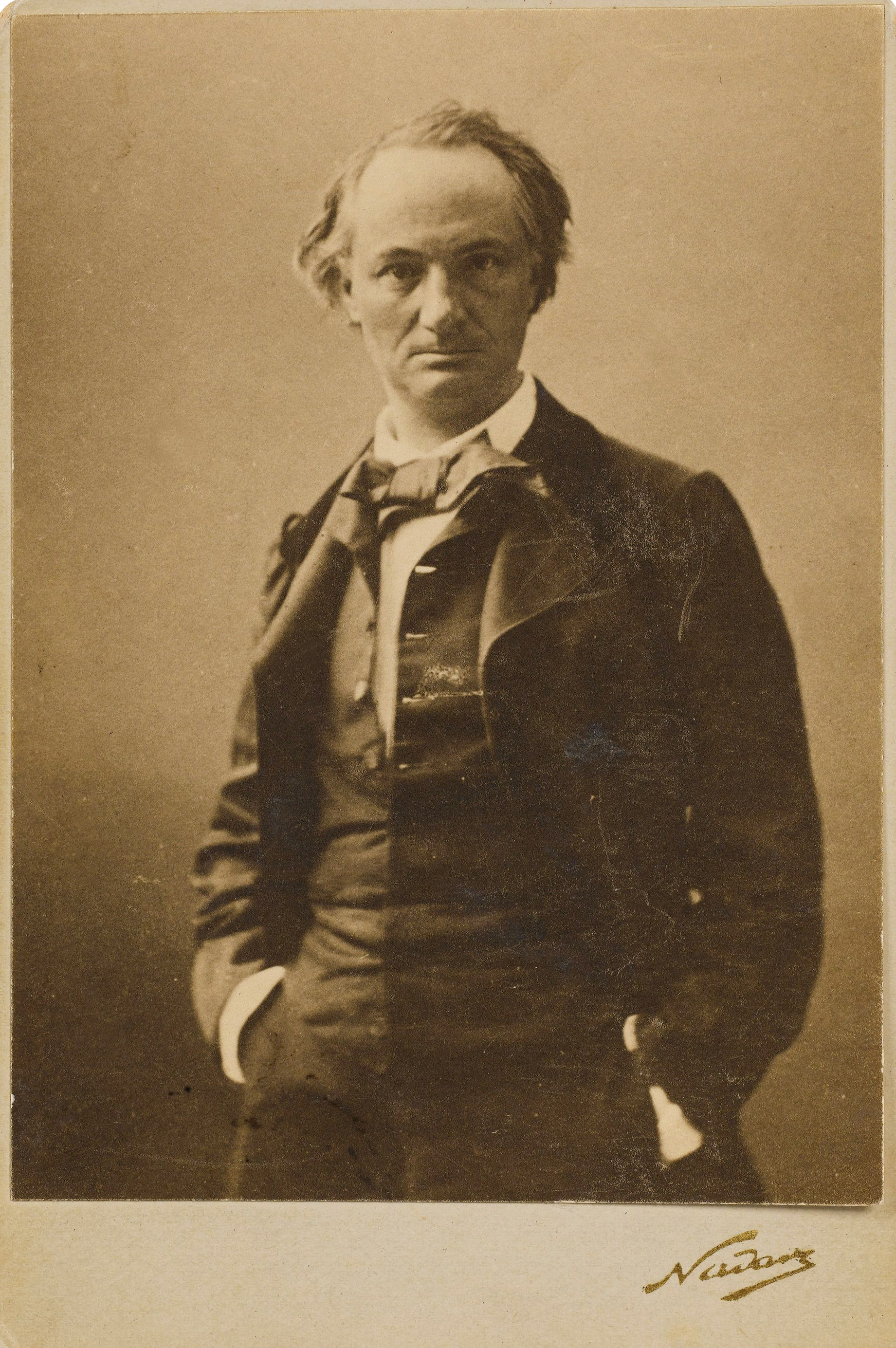
Baudelaire by Nadar, 1855

Baudelaire next worked on a translation and adaptation of Thomas De Quincey's Confessions of an English Opium-Eater. Other works in the years that followed included Petits Poèmes en prose (Small Prose poems); a series of art reviews published in the Pays, Exposition universelle (Country, World Fair); studies on Gustave Flaubert (in L'Artiste, 18 October 1857); on Théophile Gautier (Revue contemporaine, September 1858); various articles contributed to Eugène Crépet's Poètes français; Les Paradis artificiels: opium et haschisch (French poets; Artificial Paradises: opium and hashish) (1860); and Un Dernier Chapitre de l'histoire des oeuvres de Balzac (A Final Chapter of the history of works of Balzac) (1880), originally an article "Comment on paye ses dettes quand on a du génie" ("How one pays one's debts when one has genius"), in which his criticism turns against his friends Honoré de Balzac, Théophile Gautier, and Gérard de Nerval.

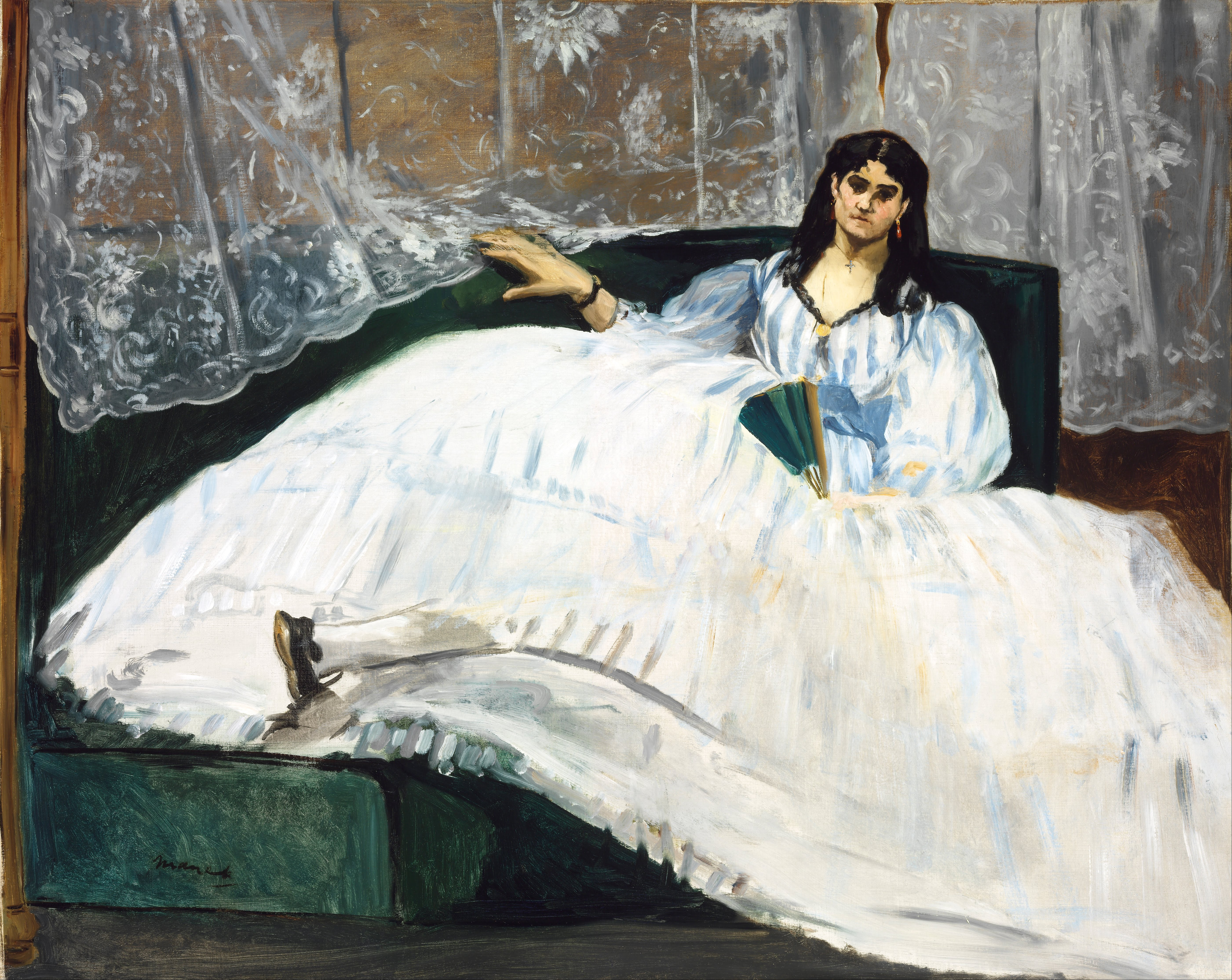
Jeanne Duval, painted by Édouard Manet in 1862 (Budapest Museum of Fine Arts)

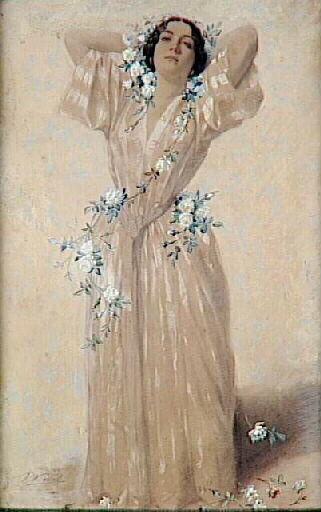
Apollonie Sabatier, painted by Vincent Vidal

By 1859, his illnesses, his long-term use of laudanum, his life of stress, and his poverty had taken a toll and Baudelaire had aged noticeably. But at last, his mother relented and agreed to let him live with her for a while at Honfleur. Baudelaire was productive and at peace in the seaside town, his poem Le Voyage being one example of his efforts during that time. In 1860, he became an ardent supporter of Richard Wagner.

His financial difficulties increased again, however, particularly after his publisher Poulet Malassis went bankrupt in 1861. In 1864, he left Paris for Belgium, partly in the hope of selling the rights to his works and to give lectures. His long-standing relationship with Jeanne Duval continued on-and-off, and he helped her to the end of his life. Baudelaire's relationships with actress Marie Daubrun and with courtesan Apollonie Sabatier, though the source of much inspiration, never produced any lasting satisfaction. He smoked opium, and in Brussels he began to drink to excess. Baudelaire suffered a massive stroke in 1866 and paralysis followed. After more than a year of aphasia, he received the last rites of the Catholic Church. The last year of his life was spent in a semi-paralyzed state in various "maisons de santé" in Brussels and in Paris, where he died on 31 August 1867. His funeral was held at the Saint-Honoré d'Eylau church, with a few dozen persons in attendance. Baudelaire is buried in the Cimetière du Montparnasse, Paris.

Many of Baudelaire's works were published posthumously. After his death, his mother paid off his substantial debts, and she found some comfort in Baudelaire's emerging fame. "I see that my son, for all his faults, has his place in literature." She lived another four years.

== Poetry ==
Who among us has not dreamt, in moments of ambition, of the miracle of a poetic prose, musical without rhythm and rhyme, supple and staccato enough to adapt to the lyrical stirrings of the soul, the undulations of dreams, and sudden leaps of consciousness. This obsessive idea is above all a child of giant cities, of the intersecting of their myriad relations.

— Dedication of Le Spleen de Paris

Baudelaire is one of the major innovators in French literature. His poetry is influenced by the French romantic poets of the earlier 19th century, although its attention to the formal features of verse connects it more closely to the work of the contemporary "Parnassians". As for theme and tone, his works exhibit the rejection of the belief in the supremacy of nature and the fundamental goodness of man as typically espoused by the romantics and expressed by them in rhetorical, effusive and public voice in favor of a new urban sensibility, an awareness of individual moral complexity, an interest in vice (linked with decadence) and refined sensual and aesthetic pleasures, and the use of urban subject matter, such as the city, the crowd, individual passers-by, all expressed in highly ordered verse, sometimes through a cynical and ironic voice. Formally, the use of sound to create atmosphere, and of "symbols" (images that take on an expanded function within the poem), betray a move towards considering the poem as a self-referential object, an idea further developed by the Symbolists Verlaine and Mallarmé, who acknowledge Baudelaire as a pioneer in this regard.

Beyond his innovations in versification and the theories of symbolism and "correspondences", an awareness of which is essential to any appreciation of the literary value of his work, aspects of his work that regularly receive much critical discussion include the role of women, the theological direction of his work and his alleged advocacy of "satanism", his experience of drug-induced states of mind, the figure of the dandy, his stance regarding democracy and its implications for the individual, his response to the spiritual uncertainties of the time, his criticisms of the bourgeois, and his advocacy of modern music and painting (e.g., Wagner, Delacroix). He made Paris the subject of modern poetry. He brought the city's details to life in the eyes and hearts of his readers.

== Critiques ==
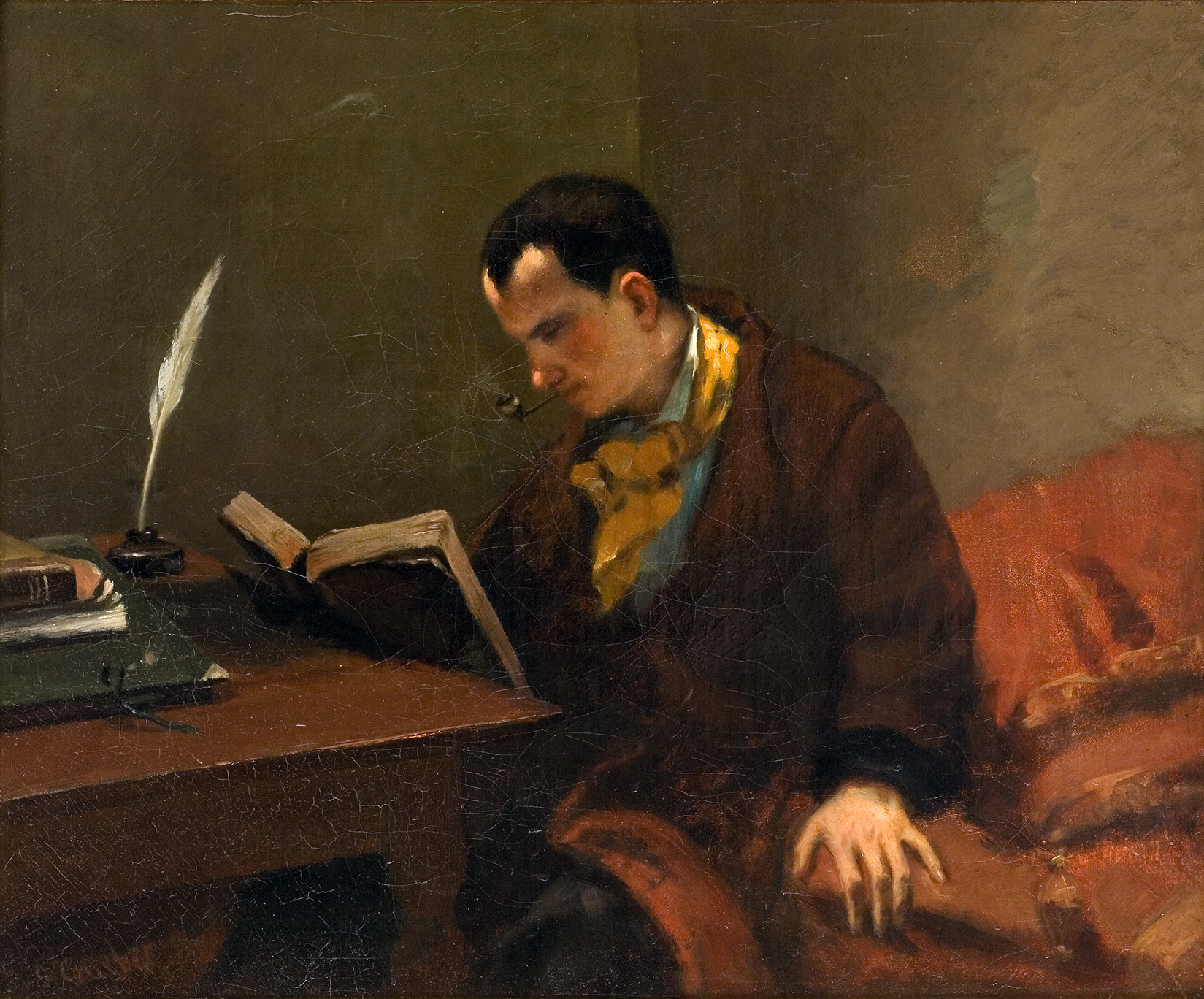
Portrait by Gustave Courbet, 1848

Baudelaire was an active participant in the artistic life of his times. As critic and essayist, he wrote extensively and perceptively about the luminaries and themes of French culture. He was frank with friends and enemies, rarely took the diplomatic approach and sometimes responded violently verbally, which often undermined his cause. His associations were numerous, including Gustave Courbet, Honoré Daumier, Félicien Rops, Franz Liszt, Champfleury, Victor Hugo, Gustave Flaubert, and Balzac.

=== Edgar Allan Poe ===
In 1847, Baudelaire became acquainted with the works of Poe, in which he found tales and poems that had, he claimed, long existed in his own brain but never taken shape. Baudelaire saw in Poe a precursor and tried to be his French contemporary counterpart. From this time until 1865, he was largely occupied with translating Poe's works; his translations were widely praised. Baudelaire was not the first French translator of Poe, but his "scrupulous translations" were considered among the best. These were published as Histoires extraordinaires (Extraordinary stories) (1856), Nouvelles histoires extraordinaires (New extraordinary stories) (1857), Aventures d'Arthur Gordon Pym, Eureka, and Histoires grotesques et sérieuses (Grotesque and serious stories) (1865). Two essays on Poe are to be found in his Œuvres complètes (Complete works) (vols. v. and vi.).

=== Eugène Delacroix ===
A strong supporter of the Romantic painter Delacroix, calling him "a poet in painting", Baudelaire also absorbed much of Delacroix's aesthetic ideas as expressed in his journals. As Baudelaire elaborated in his "Salon of 1846", "As one contemplates his series of pictures, one seems to be attending the celebration of some grievous mystery...This grave and lofty melancholy shines with a dull light.. plaintive and profound like a melody by Weber." Delacroix, though appreciative, kept his distance from Baudelaire, particularly after the scandal of Les Fleurs du mal. In private correspondence, Delacroix stated that Baudelaire "really gets on my nerves" and he expressed his unhappiness with Baudelaire's persistent comments about "melancholy" and "feverishness".

=== Richard Wagner ===
Baudelaire had no formal musical training, and knew little of composers beyond Beethoven and Weber. Weber was in some ways Wagner's precursor, using the leitmotif and conceiving the idea of the "total art work" ("Gesamtkunstwerk"), both of which gained Baudelaire's admiration. Before even hearing Wagner's music, Baudelaire studied reviews and essays about him, and formulated his impressions. Later, Baudelaire put them into his non-technical analysis of Wagner, which was highly regarded, particularly his essay "Richard Wagner et Tannhäuser à Paris". Baudelaire's reaction to music was passionate and psychological. "Music engulfs (possesses) me like the sea." After attending three Wagner concerts in Paris in 1860, Baudelaire wrote to the composer: "I had a feeling of pride and joy in understanding, in being possessed, in being overwhelmed, a truly sensual pleasure like that of rising in the air." Baudelaire's writings contributed to the elevation of Wagner and to the cult of Wagnerism that swept Europe in the following decades.

=== Théophile Gautier ===
Gautier, writer and poet, earned Baudelaire's respect for his perfection of form and his mastery of language, though Baudelaire thought he lacked deeper emotion and spirituality. Both strove to express the artist's inner vision, which Heinrich Heine earlier stated: "In artistic matters, I am a supernaturalist. I believe that the artist can not find all his forms in nature, but that the most remarkable are revealed to him in his soul." Gautier's frequent meditations on death and the horror of life are themes which influenced Baudelaire's writings. In gratitude for their friendship and commonality of vision, Baudelaire dedicated Les Fleurs du mal to Gautier.

=== Édouard Manet ===
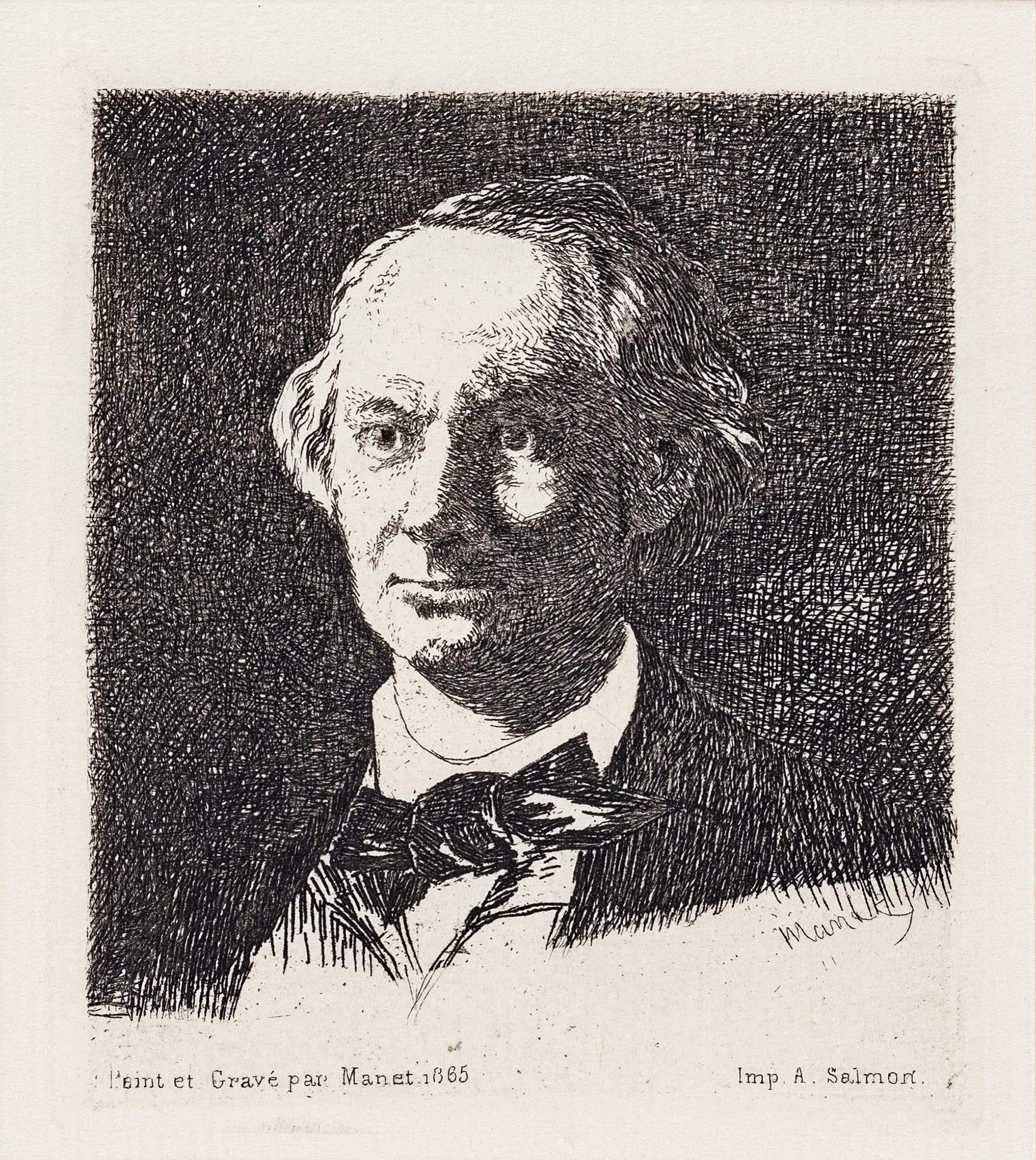
Charles Baudelaire, de face (1869 print of 1865 etching) by Édouard Manet

Manet and Baudelaire became constant companions from around 1855. In the early 1860s, Baudelaire accompanied Manet on daily sketching trips and often met him socially. Manet also lent Baudelaire money and looked after his affairs, particularly when Baudelaire went to Belgium. Baudelaire encouraged Manet to strike out on his own path and not succumb to criticism. "Manet has great talent, a talent which will stand the test of time. But he has a weak character. He seems to me crushed and stunned by shock." In his painting Music in the Tuileries, Manet includes portraits of his friends Théophile Gautier, Jacques Offenbach, and Baudelaire. While it's difficult to differentiate who influenced whom, both Manet and Baudelaire discussed and expressed some common themes through their respective arts. Baudelaire praised the modernity of Manet's subject matter: "almost all our originality comes from the stamp that 'time' imprints upon our feelings." When Manet's famous Olympia (1865), a portrait of a nude prostitute, provoked a scandal for its blatant realism mixed with an imitation of Renaissance motifs, Baudelaire worked privately to support his friend, though he offered no public defense, as he was ill at the time. When Baudelaire returned from Belgium after his stroke, Manet and his wife were frequent visitors at the nursing home and she played passages from Wagner for Baudelaire on the piano.

=== Nadar ===
Nadar (Félix Tournachon) was a noted caricaturist, scientist and important early photographer. Baudelaire admired Nadar, one of his close friends, and wrote: "Nadar is the most amazing manifestation of vitality." They moved in similar circles and Baudelaire made many social connections through him. Nadar's ex-mistress Jeanne Duval became Baudelaire's mistress around 1842. Baudelaire became interested in photography in the 1850s, and denouncing it as an art form, advocated its return to "its real purpose, which is that of being the servant to the sciences and arts". Photography should not, according to Baudelaire, encroach upon "the domain of the impalpable and the imaginary". Nadar remained a stalwart friend right to Baudelaire's last days and wrote his obituary notice in Le Figaro.

== Philosophy ==
Many of Baudelaire's philosophical proclamations were considered scandalous and intentionally provocative in his time. He wrote on a wide range of subjects, drawing criticism and outrage from many quarters. Along with Poe, Baudelaire named the arch-reactionary Joseph de Maistre as his maître à penser and adopted increasingly aristocratic views. In his journals, he wrote:

There is no form of rational and assured government save an aristocracy. [...] There are but three beings worthy of respect: the priest, the warrior and the poet. To know, to kill and to create. The rest of mankind may be taxed and drudged, they are born for the stable, that is to say, to practise what they call professions.

== Influence and legacy ==
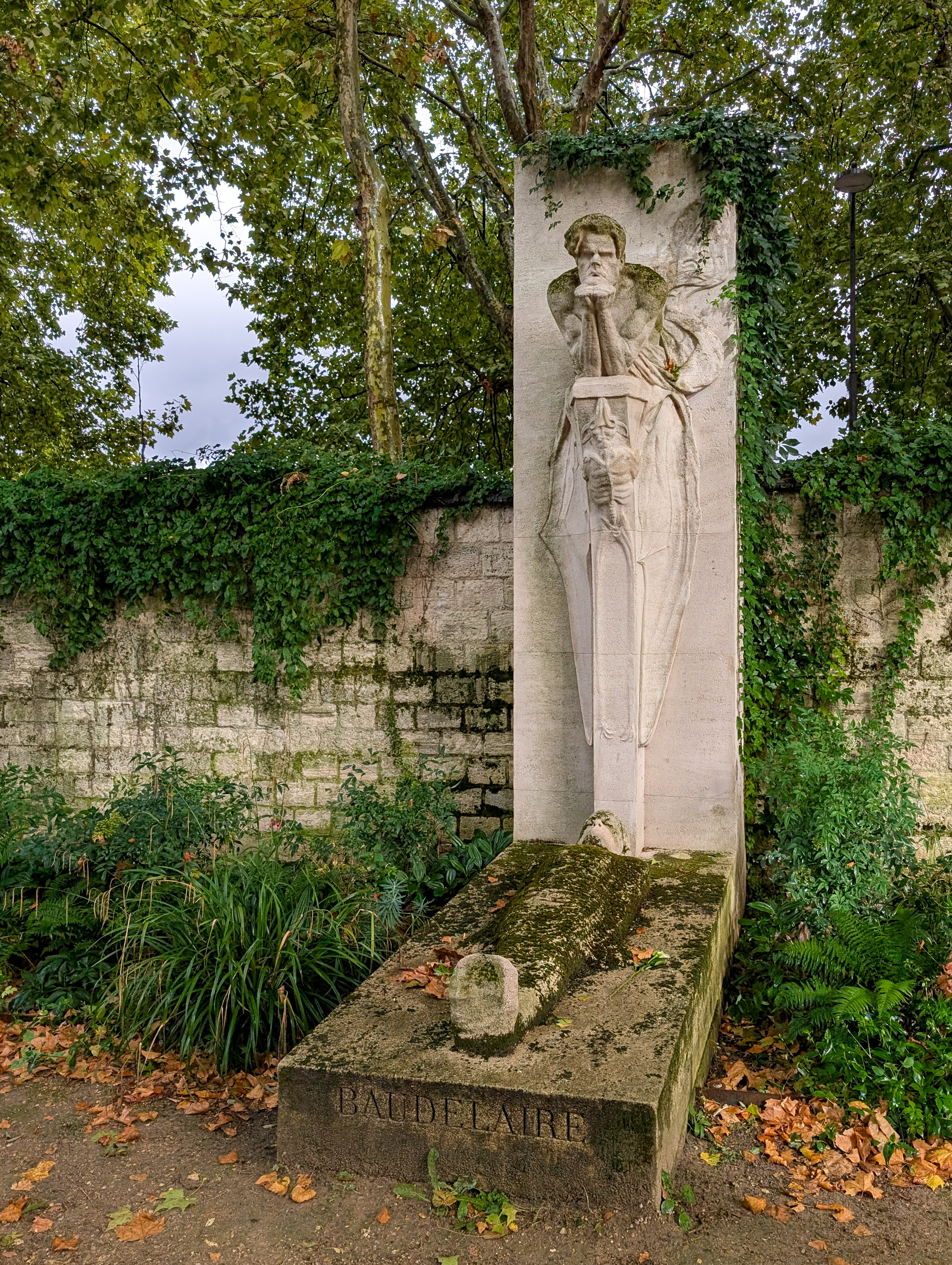
Cenotaph of Charles Baudelaire, Montparnasse Cemetery

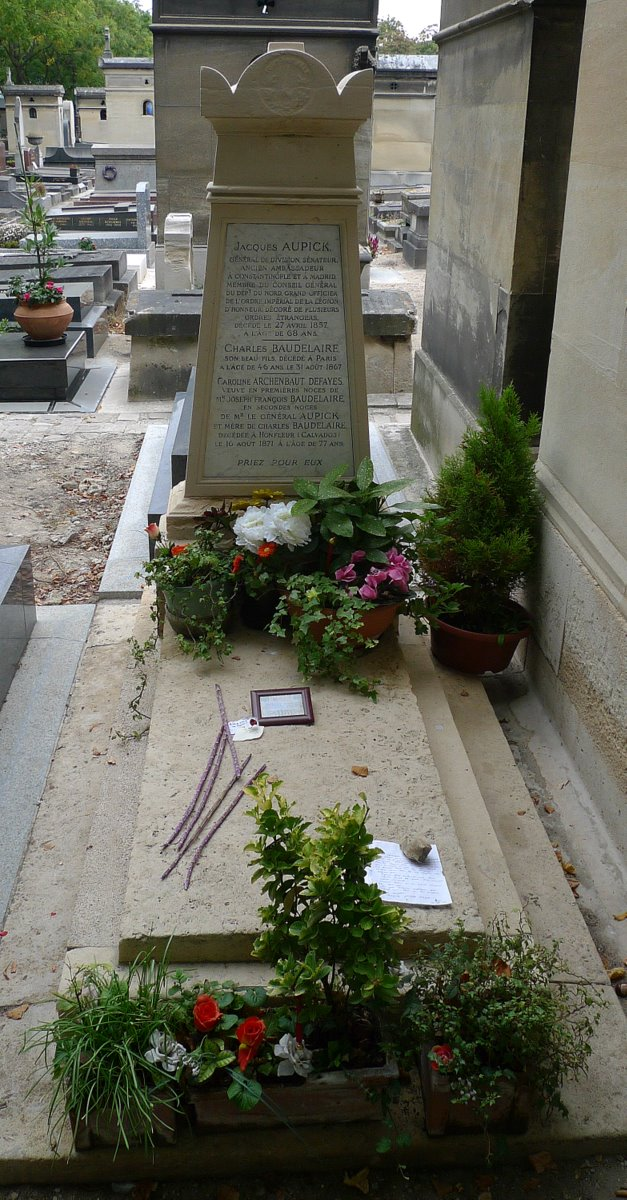
Grave of Baudelaire in Cimetière du Montparnasse

Baudelaire's influence on the direction of modern French (and English) language literature was considerable. The most significant French writers to come after him were generous with tributes; four years after his death, Arthur Rimbaud praised him in a letter as "the king of poets, a true God". In 1895, Stéphane Mallarmé published "Le Tombeau de Charles Baudelaire", a sonnet in Baudelaire's memory. Marcel Proust, in an essay published in 1922, stated that, along with Alfred de Vigny, Baudelaire was "the greatest poet of the nineteenth century".

In the English-speaking world, Edmund Wilson credited Baudelaire as providing an initial impetus for the Symbolist movement by virtue of his translations of Poe. In 1930, T. S. Eliot, while asserting that Baudelaire had not yet received a "just appreciation" even in France, claimed that the poet had "great genius" and asserted that his "technical mastery which can hardly be overpraised ... has made his verse an inexhaustible study for later poets, not only in his own language". In a lecture delivered in French on "Edgar Allan Poe and France" (Edgar Poe et la France) in Aix-en-Provence in April 1948, Eliot stated that "I am an English poet of American origin who learnt his art under the aegis of Baudelaire and the Baudelairian lineage of poets." Eliot also alluded to Baudelaire's poetry directly in his own poetry. For example, he quoted the last line of Baudelaire's "Au Lecteur" in the last line of Section I of The Waste Land.

At the same time that Eliot was affirming Baudelaire's importance from a broadly conservative and explicitly Christian viewpoint, left-wing critics such as Wilson and Walter Benjamin were able to do so from a dramatically different perspective. Benjamin translated Baudelaire's Tableaux Parisiens into German and published a major essay on translation as the foreword.

In the late 1930s, Benjamin used Baudelaire as a starting point and focus for Das Passagenwerk, his monumental attempt at a materialist assessment of 19th-century culture. For Benjamin, Baudelaire's importance lay in his anatomies of the crowd, of the city and of modernity. He says that, in Les Fleurs du mal, "the specific devaluation of the world of things, as manifested in the commodity, is the foundation of Baudelaire's allegorical intention."

François Porché published a poetry collection called Charles Baudelaire: Poetry Collection in memory of Baudelaire.

The novel A Singular Conspiracy (1974) by Barry Perowne is a fictional treatment of the unaccounted period in Edgar Allan Poe's life from January to May 1844, in which (among other things) Poe becomes involved with a young Baudelaire in a plot to expose Baudelaire's stepfather to blackmail, to free up Baudelaire's patrimony.

Vanderbilt University has "assembled one of the world's most comprehensive research collections on ... Baudelaire".

== Works ==
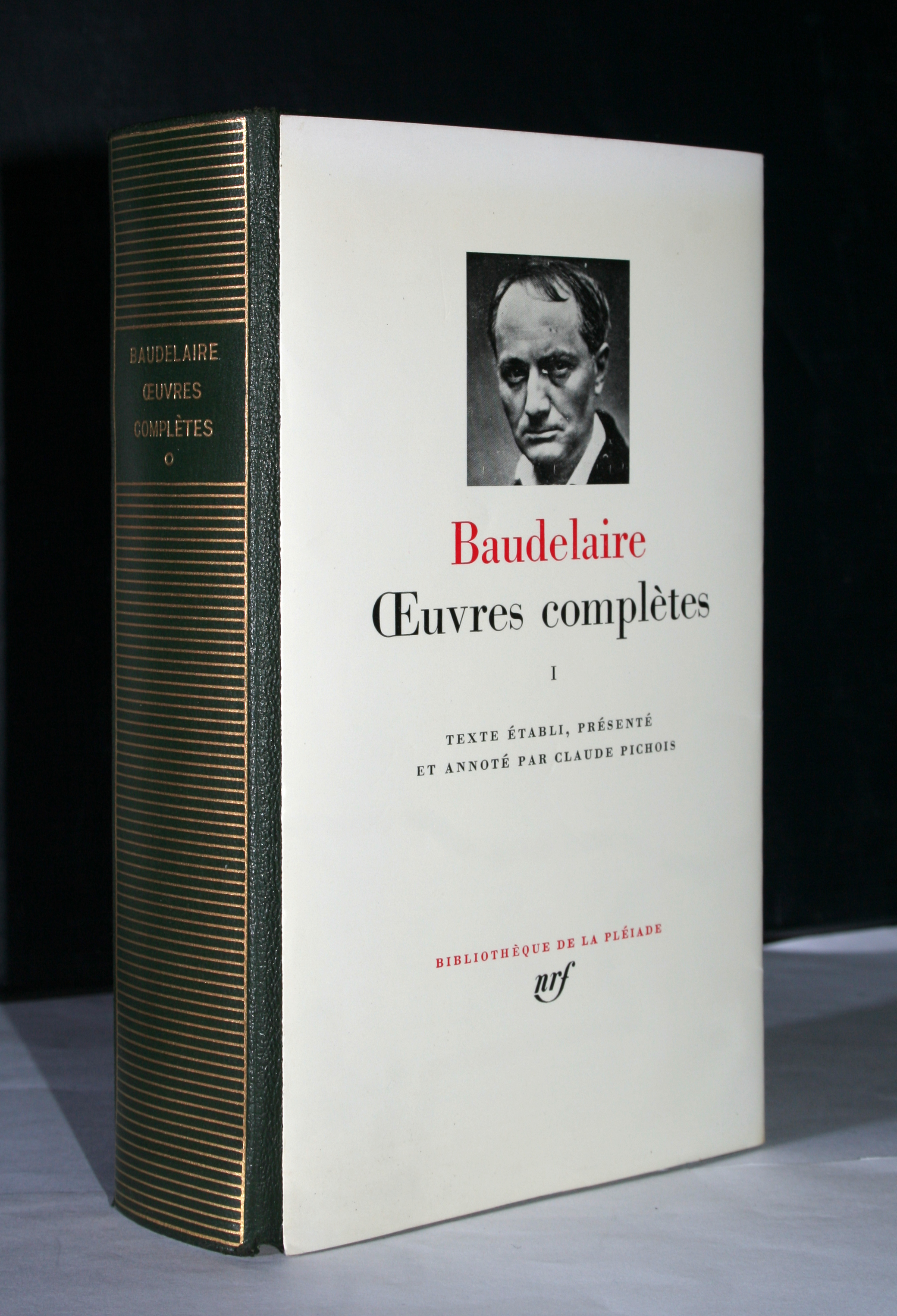
Baudelaire, Bibliothèque de la Pléiade, Œuvres complètes (Complete Works), volume I

- Salon de 1845
- Salon de 1846
- La Fanfarlo (1847)
- L'Art romantique (1852; 1869)
- Les Fleurs du mal (1857; 1861; 1868). The Flowers of Evil
- Salon de 1859
- Les Paradis artificiels (1860). Artificial Paradises
- Réflexions sur quelques-uns de mes contemporains (1861)
- Le Peintre de la vie moderne (1863). The Painter of Modern Life

=== Posthumous publications in French ===
- Œuvres complètes (Michel Lévy Frères, 1868–70)
  - Vol. 1: Les Fleurs du mal
  - Vol. 2: Curiosités esthétiques
  - Vol. 3: L'Art romantique
  - Vol. 4: Petits poèmes en prose or Le Spleen de Paris (Paris Spleen)
  - Vol. 5: Histoires extraordinaires (Poe translation)
  - Vol. 6: Nouvelles Histoires extraordinaires (Poe translations)
  - Vol. 7: Aventures d'Arthur Gordon Pym (Poe translation)
- Œuvres posthumes et correspondances inédites, ed. Eugène Crépet (Maison Quantin, 1887). Includes Fusées (Flares), Mon cœur mis à nu (My Heart Laid Bare) and excerpts of La Belgique vraie (also known as Pauvre Belgique or La Belgique déshabillée)
- Œuvres complètes, ed. Jacques Crépet and Claude Pichois (Éditions Conard, 1922–53). In 19 volumes; includes complete text of Pauvre Belgique
- Correspondance, ed. Claude Pichois (Bibliothèque de la Pléiade, 1973)
- Œuvres complètes, ed. Claude Pichois (Bibliothèque de la Pléiade, 1975–76)

=== Posthumous publications in English ===
- Translations from Charles Baudelaire, trans. Richard Herne Shepherd (J.C. Hotten, 1869)
- The Letters of Charles Baudelaire to His Mother 1833–1866, trans. Arthur Symons (1928)
- Intimate Journals, trans. Christopher Isherwood (1930)
- My Heart Laid Bare and Other Prose Writings, trans. Norman Cameron (1950)
- The Mirror of Art: Critical Studies by Baudelaire, trans. and ed. Jonathan Mayne (1955)
- The Essence of Laughter and Other Essays, Journals, and Letters (Meridian Books, 1956)
- Baudelaire as a Literary Critic: Selected Essays, trans. Lois Boe Hyslop and Francis E. Hyslop Jr. (1964)
- Arts in Paris 1845–1862 (Phaidon, 1965)
- Selected Writings on Art and Artists, trans. P. E. Charvet (Penguin, 1972)
- Selected Letters of Charles Baudelaire: The Conquest of Solitude, trans. Rosemary Lloyd (University of Chicago Press, 1986)
- My Heart Laid Bare & Other Texts, trans. Rainer J. Hanshe (Contra Mundum Press, 2017)
- Late Fragments: Flares, My Heart Laid Bare, Prose Poems, Belgium Disrobed, trans. Richard Sieburth (Yale University Press, 2022)

== See also ==
- Épater la bourgeoisie
- Le Tintamarre
