= Louis Bouilhet =

French poet and dramatist (1821–1869)

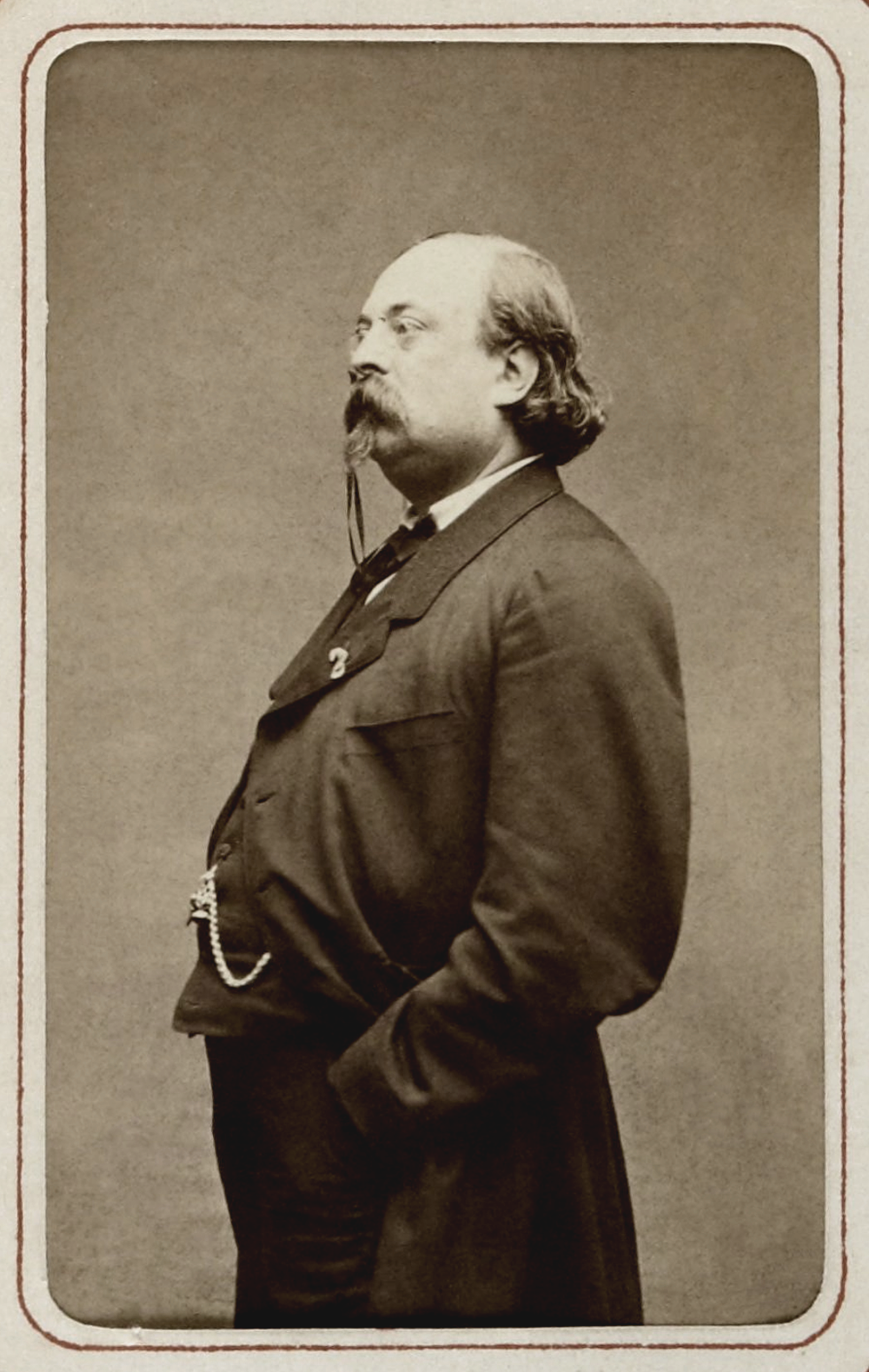
- Louis Bouilhet by Étienne Carjat, in 1864
- Born: 27 May 1821; Cany-Barville, France
- Died: 16 July 1869 (aged 48); Rouen, France
- Occupations: Playwright, poet

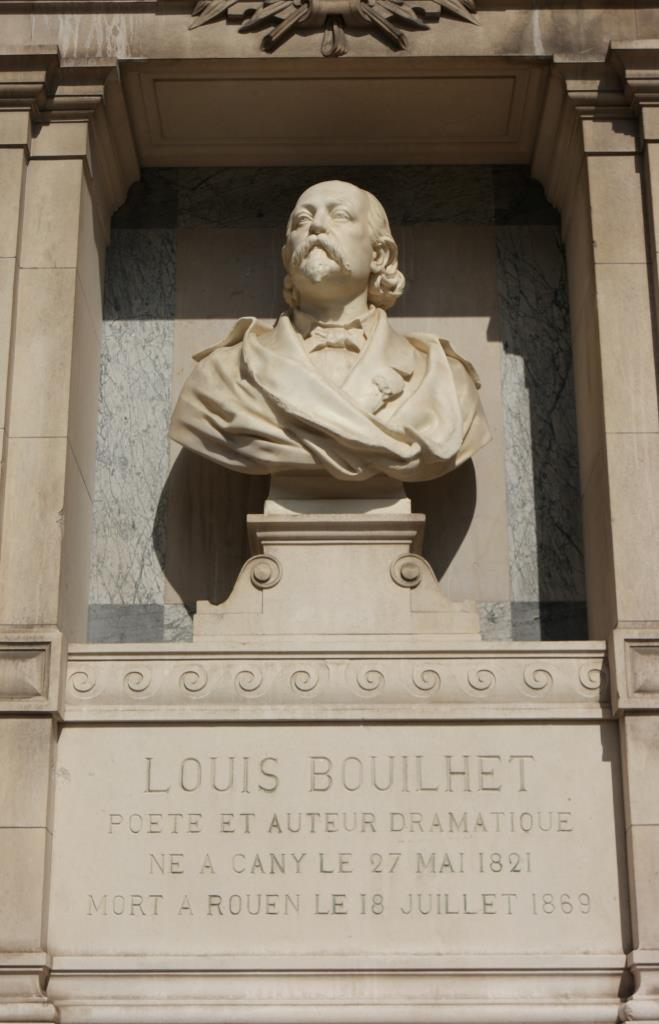
Memorial of Louis Bouilhet at the Musée des Beaux-Arts in Rouen

Louis Hyacinthe Bouilhet (French: [lwi bujɛ]; 27 May 1821 – 18 July 1869) was a French poet and dramatist.

== Life ==
=== Early life ===
Bouilhet was born in Cany, Seine Inférieure to Jean-Nicolas Bouilhet and Opportune-Clarisse Hourcastremé. Bouilhet also had two younger sisters, Marie-Sidonie and Claire-Amelie-Esther. Bouilhets father was director of field hospitals and had been injured during the Battle of Beresina and after leaving the army he became a manager of an estate.

Both of Bouilhet´s parents had literary leanings. His father wrote poetry, songs and a memoir of his army life; his mother wrote poetry. Bouilhet´s mother had received a good education from her father, Pierre Hourcastremé, who was a writer of mathematics, political essays and ballads.

Bouilhet´s fathers health had been weakened from his time in the military and he died in 1832 while Bouilhet was still a child. Bouilhet´s mother supported the family as the director of a girls boarding school that her father founded.

== Education ==
Through efforts of his grandfather, Bouilhet was enrolled in a boarding school at Ingouville and later continued his education at the College of Rouen. After completing his bachelor's degree, Bouilhet decided to pursue medicine, and became an intern at the hospital in Rouen. As a young man, Bouilhet was described as an " Apollonian beauty with a somewhat shy look, with long blond hair, and always holding bound notebooks under his arm."

In 1845, Bouilhet decided to give up the medical profession and pursue writing. He relocated to Paris.

== Career ==
Bouilhet was a schoolmate of Gustave Flaubert, to whom he dedicated his first work, Melaenis, conte romain (1851), a narrative poem in five cantos dealing with Roman manners under the emperor Commodus. His volume of poems Fossiles attracted considerable attention for its attempt to make science a subject for poetry. These poems were also included in his Festons et astragales (1859).

Bouilhet is also said to have suggested the plot outline for Flaubert's Madame Bovary, basing it on one of Flaubert´s fathers medical students, Eugene Delamare, whose wife Delphine took many lovers, fell into debt, and committed suicide in 1848.

As a dramatist he was successful with his first play, Madame de Monlarcy (1856), which ran for 28 nights at the Odéon; Hélène Peyron (1858) and L'Oncle Million (1860) were also favorably received. Of his other plays, only Conjuration d'Amboise (1866) met with any real success.

== Personal life ==
Bouilhet never married but carried on an affair with a married woman, Edma Roger des Genettes, who held literary salons and was known as "Sylphide" for her narrow waist. Bouilhet dedicate the poem "To my lovely reader" to her after she read his work Melaenis aloud.

== Death ==
Bouilhet died on 18 July 1869, at Rouen. Flaubert published his posthumous poems with a notice by the author in 1872.

Bouilhet was Flaubert's mentor and guide; Flaubert never wrote anything without his advice. A few months after Bouilhet's death in 1869, Flaubert wrote about his old friend, "When I lost my poor Bouilhet, I lost my midwife, the man who saw more clearly into my mind than I did myself." According to Starkie, Maxime Du Camp, who knew Bouilhet and Flaubert well, said of the two authors, "It was Bouilhet who was the master, in the matter of literature at least, and that it was Flaubert who obeyed." Throughout their lives, Flaubert referred to Bouilhet as "Monseigneur."

== See also ==
- List of works by Eugène Guillaume
