= Tamara Drewe =

British comic strip by Posy Simmonds

- Author(s): Posy Simmonds
- Website: www.theguardian.com/books/series/tamara-drewe
- Launch date: 24 September 2005
- End date: 20 October 2007
- Publisher(s): The Guardian

Tamara Drewe is a graphic novel by Posy Simmonds. It first appeared as a weekly serial with a thirteen month run in The Guardian's Review section. It is a modern reworking of Thomas Hardy's 1874 novel Far from the Madding Crowd.

The story was adapted into a feature film starring Gemma Arterton.

== Plot ==
The story is set in Stonefield, a writer's retreat run by Beth and Nicholas Hardiman, where the novelist Glen Larson stays to find inspiration for his latest novel. Tamara Drewe, a young gossip columnist, has returned to her family home nearby. Her sexy looks have every man in the village falling for her. When she has a relationship with rock star Ben Sergeant she unknowingly inflames two teenage schoolgirl fans of his, Casey and Jody, who start to involve themselves in her affairs.

== Publication history ==
The first episode appeared The Guardian on 17 September 2005, in the first Berliner-sized Saturday edition.

== Collected editions ==
The complete work was published as a single volume with hardcover (Jonathan Cape, November 2007, ISBN 0-224-07816-X) and softcover editions (Mariner Books, October 2008, ISBN 0-547-15412-7; Jonathan Cape, September 2009, ISBN 0-224-07817-8). It has also been translated into French (Editions Denoël, October 2008, ISBN 2-207-26043-7), German (Reprodukt, January 2010, ISBN 978-3-941099-31-9), Italian (Nottetempo, January 2011, ISBN 978-8-874522-72-9) and Swedish (Wibom books, October 2011, ISBN 978-91-978213-4-6).

== Awards ==
Tamara Drewe won the 2009 Prix de la critique.

== Film adaptation ==
The graphic novel has been adapted into a feature film starring Gemma Arterton and Dominic Cooper and directed by Stephen Frears. Momentum Pictures released the film in the UK on 10 September 2010. The film premièred at the Cannes Film Festival in May 2010
