= Tamara Drewe (film) =

2010 British romantic comedy film by Stephen Frears

- UK theatrical release poster
- Directed by: Stephen Frears
- Screenplay by: Moira Buffini
- Based on: Tamara Drewe by Posy Simmonds
- Produced by: Alison Owen; Tracey Seaward; Paul Trijbits
- Starring: Gemma Arterton; Roger Allam; Bill Camp; Dominic Cooper; Luke Evans; Tamsin Greig; Jessica Barden
- Cinematography: Ben Davis
- Edited by: Mick Audsley
- Music by: Alexandre Desplat
- Production companies: West End Films; BBC Films; UK Film Council; Ruby Films
- Distributed by: Momentum Pictures
- Release dates: 18 May 2010 (Cannes); 20 September 2010 (United Kingdom)
- Running time: 111 minutes
- Country: United Kingdom
- Language: English
- Budget: £6–8 million
- Box office: US$12 million

Tamara Drewe is a 2010 British romantic comedy film directed by Stephen Frears. The screenplay was written by Moira Buffini, based on the newspaper comic strip of the same name (which was then re-published as a graphic novel) written by Posy Simmonds. The comic strip which serves as source material was a modern reworking of Thomas Hardy's 1874 novel Far from the Madding Crowd.

The film premiered at the 2010 Cannes Film Festival in May and was released nationwide in France on 14 July 2010. Momentum Pictures released the film in the United Kingdom on 10 September 2010.

== Plot ==
In the fictitious Dorset village of Ewedown, Tamara Drewe, a young and beautiful journalist, returns home after living in London, with the intention of selling her deceased mother's house, in which she grew up. Locals are amazed at the improvement in her appearance after she had rhinoplasty while away. Andy had been interested in her when she was a girl, and when he sees her now it is clear that he is still attracted to her. However, she begins a relationship with rock-band-drummer Ben whom she meets at a music festival held in the village.

Across the valley is a neighbour's home where authors retreat to work. The owner, Nicholas, is a prolific crime novelist and a serial philanderer, while his wife Beth provides food, lodging, and encouragement for her patrons. After being discovered by Beth having an affair which he then ends, Nicholas embarks on an affair with Tamara, after she and Ben have split up. Andy has been asked by Tamara to work on the house so she can sell it, and he becomes aware of the affair with Nicholas, as do two local teenaged schoolgirls, Jody and Casey, who cause some havoc due to their jealousy of Tamara's relationship with Ben.

Jody is infatuated with Ben and distraught that she won't see him in the village again, because he left Ewedown after he and Tamara split up, so she manipulates him into returning. Eventually her deceit is discovered. Nicholas and Tamara's affair is revealed and in a strange turn of events, Nicholas is accidentally killed by stampeding cows. Beth's friend Glen, a Thomas Hardy scholar who had become infatuated with her over the months he spent there, reveals his love for her despite feeling guilty about Nicholas's demise, which happened after a confrontation between the two. She easily persuades him to remain at the retreat with her. By this time the true love of Andy and Tamara brings them together, and Tamara decides to stay in Ewedown after all.

== Cast ==
- Gemma Arterton as Tamara Drewe
- Roger Allam as Nicholas Hardiment
- Bill Camp as Glen McCreavy
- Dominic Cooper as Ben Sergeant
- Luke Evans as Andy Cobb
- Tamsin Greig as Beth Hardiment
- Jessica Barden as Jody Long
- Charlotte Christie as Casey Shaw
- John Bett as Diggory
- Josie Taylor as Zoe
- Zahra Ahmadi as Nadia Patel
- Bronagh Gallagher as Eustacia
- Pippa Haywood as Tess
- Susan Wooldridge as Penny Upminster
- Alex Kelly as Jody's mother
- Lola Frears as Poppy Hardiment
- Joel Fry as Steve Culley
- Cheryl Campbell as Lucetta

== Premiere ==
The UK premiere was held on 6 September 2010 at the Odeon Leicester Square. Most of the cast and crew were in attendance as well as Lily Allen and Stephen Fry.

The public premiere was also held on 6 September 2010, at the National Film Theatre. Most of the cast were in attendance as well as director Stephen Frears, screenwriter Moira Buffini, and book author Posy Simmonds. The film's showing received long applause and was followed by questions to the stars from the audience.

== Reception ==
=== Box office ===
The film grossed $12,037,973.

=== Critical response ===
The film holds a 65% approval rating on review aggregator Rotten Tomatoes, based on 130 reviews with an average rating of 6.30/10. The website's critics consensus reads: "A robust comedic cast and Stephen Frears' gift for satire elevate Tamara Drewe's slight scenario into a tart treat." Metacritic gave it a score of 64 out of 100 based on reviews from 28 critics, indicating 'generally favourable reviews'.

Empire gave four stars out of five stating the film was "Very intelligently funny, with stellar performances." Lisa Mullen wrote in Sight & Sound in October 2010:

Turning graphic novels into films can be a tricky business...an impressively limpid, compressed and visually textured piece... here the romantic themes—concerning sensible spouse choice... are undercut by a bawdy appreciation of chaos, mischief and mayhem... Beth Hardiment played with great subtlety and a kind of concentrated stillness by Tamsin Greig...

=== Accolades ===
Year	Award/Festival	Category	Nominee	Result
2010	63rd Cannes Film Festival	Palm Dog Award	Boss	Won
2010	7th Seville European Film Festival	Audience Award	Stephen Frears	Won
2010	13th British Independent Film Awards	Best Supporting Actress	Tamsin Greig	Nominated
2011	38th Evening Standard British Film Awards	Peter Sellers Award for Comedy	Roger Allam	Won
2011	31st London Film Critics Circle Awards	Young British Performer of the Year	Jessica Barden	Nominated
2011	8th Irish Film & Television Awards	Best Costume Design	Consolata Boyle	Nominated
