= La Fanfarlo =

1847 novella by Charles Baudelaire

La Fanfarlo is a work by French poet Charles Baudelaire, first published in January 1847. The novella describes a fictionalised account of the writer's love affair with a dancer, Jeanne Duval.

Irish literary critic Enid Starkie, known for her biographical works on French poets, said about La Fanfarlo:

This work marked the last burst of energy in Baudelaire for a long time, and his zest for work faded as suddenly as it had begun. After its publication in January 1847, his output slowed and he fell into one of these moods of lethargy, idleness, and incapacity for work which were to occur frequently throughout his life, especially after a bout of creative activity.

— Enid Starkie, in Baudelaire in Chains by Frank Hilton, p. 100.
