= Posy Simmonds =

British cartoonist, writer and illustrator

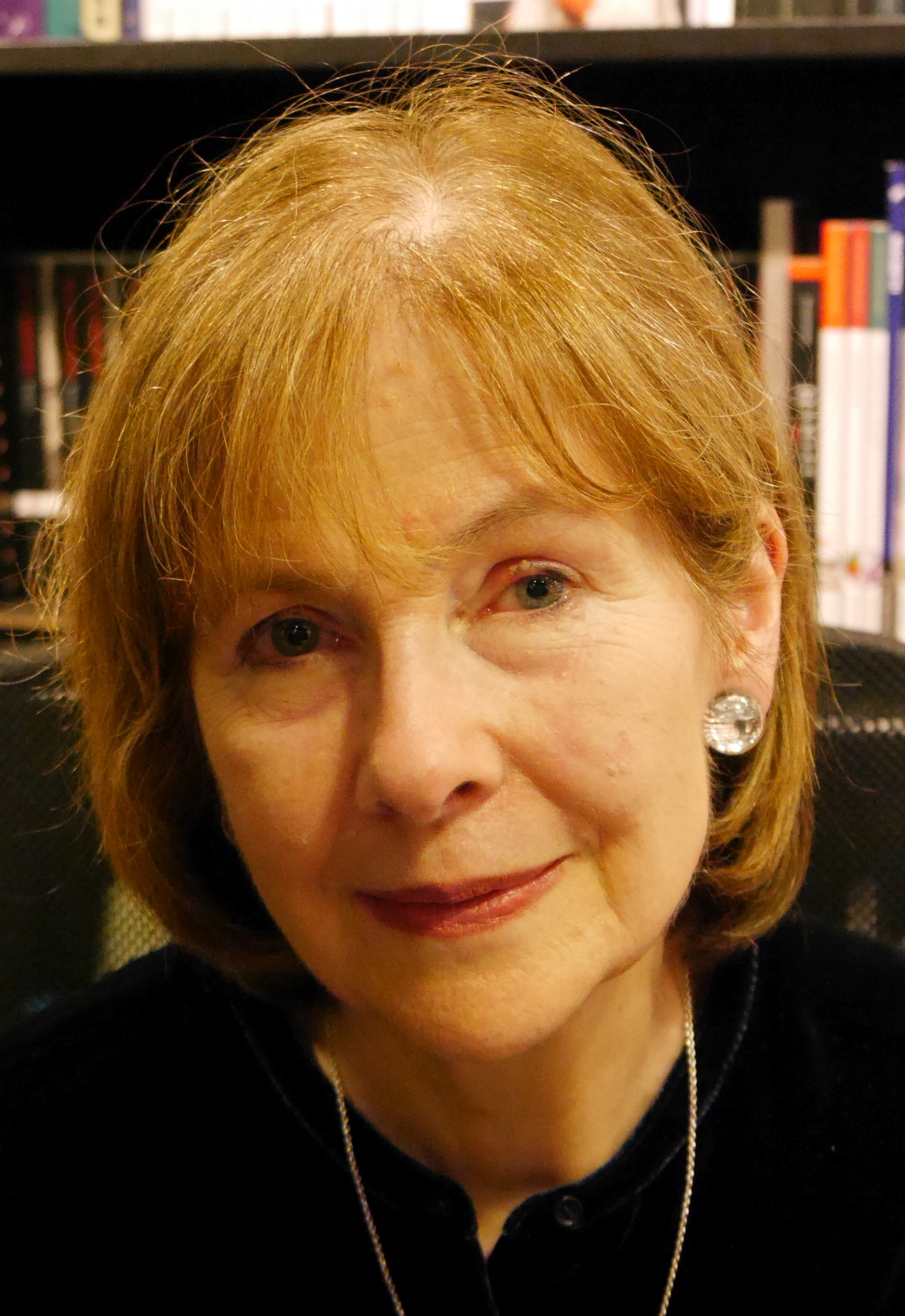
- Simmonds at Hatchards, London, November 2018
- Born: Rosemary Elizabeth Simmonds; 9 August 1945 (age 81) Berkshire, England
- Areas: Cartoonist; Illustrator; Writer
- Notable works: Gemma Bovery; Tamara Drewe
- Awards: MBE, Prix de la critique, British Comic Awards Hall of Fame (2014)

Rosemary Elizabeth "Posy" Simmonds MBE, FRSL (born 9 August 1945) is a British newspaper cartoonist, and writer and illustrator of both children's books and graphic novels. She is best known for her long association with The Guardian, for which she drew the series Gemma Bovery (2000) and Tamara Drewe (2005–06), both later published as books. Her style gently satirises the English middle classes and in particular those of a literary bent. Both Gemma Bovery and Tamara Drew feature a "doomed heroine", much in the style of the eighteenth- and nineteenth-century gothic romantic novel, to which they often allude, but with an ironic, modernist slant.

== Early life ==
Posy Simmonds was born in Berkshire on 9 August 1945, the daughter of Reginald A. C. Simmonds and Betty Cahusac. Her brother is the Conservative politician Richard Simmonds. She was educated at Queen Anne's School, Caversham. She studied at the Sorbonne before returning to London to attend Central School of Art & Design, where she received a BA in Art and Design. In 1974, she married Richard Graham Hollis.

== Career ==
Simmonds started her newspaper career drawing a daily cartoon, "Bear", for The Sun in 1969. She contributed humorous illustrations to The Times from 1968 to 1970. She also contributed to Cosmopolitan, and a satirical cartoon to Tariq Ali's Black Dwarf magazine. She moved to The Guardian as an illustrator in 1972.

In May 1977 she started drawing a weekly comic strip for The Guardian, initially titled The Silent Three of St Botolph's as a tribute to the 1950s strip The Silent Three by Evelyn Flinders. It began as a silly parody of girls' adventure stories making satirical comments about contemporary life. The strip soon focused on three 1950s schoolfriends in their later, middle-class and nearly middle-aged lives: Wendy Weber, a former nurse married to polytechnic sociology lecturer George with a large brood of children; Jo Heep, married to whisky salesman Edmund with two rebellious teenagers; and Trish Wright, married to philandering advertising executive Stanhope and with a young baby. The strip, which was latterly untitled and usually known just as "Posy", ran until the late 1980s. It was collected into a number of books: Mrs Weber's Diary, Pick of Posy, Very Posy and Pure Posy, and one original book featuring the same characters, True Love. Her later cartoons for The Guardian and The Spectator were collected as Mustn't Grumble in 1993.

She was elected a Fellow of the Royal Society of Literature in 2004.

In 1981, Simmonds was named Cartoonist of the Year in the British Press Awards. In 1982 and 1983 she contributed a regular full-page strip to Harper's Magazine in America. In 1987 Simmonds turned her hand to writing, as well as illustrating, children's books. Fred, the story of a cat with a secret life, was later filmed as Famous Fred and nominated for the Academy Award for Animated Short Film and several BAFTAs. Her other children's books include Lulu and the Flying Babies, The Chocolate Wedding and Lavender.

In the late 1990s Simmonds returned to the pages of The Guardian with Gemma Bovery, which reworked the story of Gustave Flaubert's Madame Bovary into a satirical tale of English expatriates in France. It was published as a graphic novel in 1999 and was made into a feature film of the same name (Gemma Bovery), directed by Anne Fontaine, in 2014, and starring Gemma Arterton. The Literary Life series of cartoons appeared in The Guardian's "Review" section on Saturdays from November 2002 until December 2004, and was published in book form in 2003 (Literary Life) and, in an expanded version, in 2017 (Literary Life Revisited).

Simmond's 2005-6 Guardian series, Tamara Drewe, which echoes Thomas Hardy's novel Far From the Madding Crowd, made its début in the Review section on 17 September 2005, in the first Saturday paper after the Guardian's relaunch in the Berliner format. It ended, with episode 109 and an epilogue, on 2 December 2006 and was published as a book in 2007. In 2010 the story was adapted as a feature film of the same name, directed by Stephen Frears from a screenplay by Moira Buffini, again starring Gemma Arterton.

Simmonds' third, critically acclaimed graphic novel, Cassandra Darke, was published in 2018. It is loosely based on Charles Dickens' novella A Christmas Carol; although the story unfolds in 2016-17, its eponymous protagonist is in some respects a female version of Ebenezer Scrooge, and also undergoes a profound (though more subtle and ambiguous) moral transformation.

Simmonds drew the illustrations for the opening titles of the BBC's 2007 production of Elizabeth Gaskell's Cranford, and for Midsummer Nights, a volume of opera-related short stories by prominent writers published in 2009 to mark the 75th anniversary of the Glyndebourne Opera Festival. She was made a Member of the Order of the British Empire in 2002 for services to the newspaper industry. After being nominated already in 2001 for Gemma Bovery, Simmonds won the 2009 Prix de la critique of the French Association of comics critics and journalists for Tamara Drewe. In 2022 she was awarded the Grand Prix Töpffer (named after Rodolphe Töpffer, the author of the earliest comic strips) by the city of Geneva, Switzerland. In 2024 she was awarded the Grand Prix de la ville d'Angoulême, being the first British cartoonist to do so.

== Selected bibliography ==
- The Posy Simmonds Bear Book (1969)
- Bear (1974)
- More Bear (1975)
- Mrs Weber's Diary (1979)
- True Love (1981)
- Pick of Posy (1982)
- Very Posy (1985)
- Pure Posy (1987)
- Mustn't Grumble (1993)
- Gemma Bovery (1999)
- Literary Life (2003)
- Tamara Drewe (2007)
- Cassandra Darke (2018)

=== Children's books ===
- Fred (1987)
- Lulu and the Flying Babies (1988)
- The Chocolate Wedding (1990)
- Matilda: Who Told Lies and Was Burned To Death (1991)
- Bouncing Buffalo (1994)
- F-Freezing ABC (1996)
- Cautionary Tales And Other Verses (1997)
- Mr Frost (2001, in Little Litt #2)
- Lavender (2003)
- Baker Cat (2004)

== Television/film scripts ==
- The Frog Prince (1984)
- Tresoddit for Easter (1991)
- Famous Fred (1996)
