= Far from the Madding Crowd =

1874 novel by Thomas Hardy

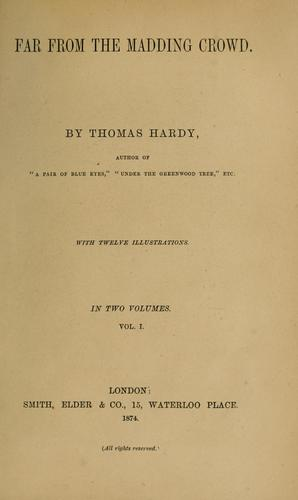
- The title page from an 1874 first edition of Far from the Madding Crowd.
- Author: Thomas Hardy
- Language: English
- Series: Wessex Novels
- Release number: 3rd (Wessex Novels); 4th (overall)
- Genre: Novel
- Set in: Thomas Hardy's Wessex
- Publisher: Cornhill Magazine
- Publication date: 23 November 1874
- Publication place: England
- Pages: 464 pages (Harper & Brothers edition, 1912)
- Preceded by: A Pair of Blue Eyes
- Followed by: The Hand of Ethelberta
- Text: Far from the Madding Crowd at Wikisource

Far from the Madding Crowd is the fourth published novel by English author Thomas Hardy; and his first major literary success. It was published on 23 November 1874. It originally appeared anonymously as a monthly serial in Cornhill Magazine, where it gained a wide readership.

The novel is set in Thomas Hardy's Wessex in rural southwest England, as had been his earlier Under the Greenwood Tree. It deals in themes of love, honour and betrayal, against a backdrop of the seemingly idyllic, but often harsh, realities of a farming community in Victorian England. It describes the life and relationships of Bathsheba Everdene with her lonely neighbour William Boldwood, the faithful shepherd Gabriel Oak, and the faithless soldier Sgt. Frank Troy.

On publication, critical notices were plentiful and mostly positive. Hardy revised the text extensively for the 1895 edition and made further changes for the 1901 edition.

The novel has an enduring legacy. In 2003, the novel was listed at number 48 on the BBC's survey The Big Read, while in 2007, it was ranked 10th on The Guardian's list of greatest love stories of all time. The novel has also been dramatised several times, notably in the Oscar-nominated 1967 film directed by John Schlesinger.

== Synopsis ==
=== Meeting, parting and reuniting ===
Gabriel Oak is a young shepherd. With the savings of a frugal life, and a loan, he has leased and stocked a farm. He falls in love with a newcomer eight years his junior, Bathsheba Everdene, who arrives to live with her aunt. Over time, Bathsheba and Gabriel grow to like each other well enough, and Bathsheba even saves his life once. However, when he makes her an unadorned offer of marriage, she refuses; she values her independence too much and him too little. Days later, she moves to Weatherbury, a village some miles off.

When next they meet, their circumstances have changed drastically. An inexperienced new sheepdog has driven Gabriel's flock over a cliff, ruining him. After selling off everything of value, he manages to settle all his debts but emerges penniless. He seeks employment at a hiring fair in the town of Casterbridge. When he finds none, he heads to another such fair in Shottsford, a town about ten miles from Weatherbury. On his way, he spots a fire on a farm and leads the bystanders in putting it out. When the veiled owner comes to thank him, he asks if she needs a shepherd. She uncovers her face and reveals herself to be Bathsheba. She has recently inherited her uncle's estate and is now wealthy. Though somewhat uncomfortable, she employs him.

=== Bathsheba's valentine to Boldwood ===
Meanwhile, Bathsheba gains a new admirer. William Boldwood is a prosperous farmer of about forty, whose ardour Bathsheba unwittingly awakens when she playfully sends him a valentine sealed with red wax on which she has embossed the words "Marry me". Boldwood, not realising the valentine was a jest, becomes obsessed with her and soon proposes marriage assuming she wanted the same. Despite not loving him, she toys with the idea of accepting his offer; he is the most eligible bachelor in the district, wealthy and handsome. However, she avoids giving him a definite answer. When Gabriel rebukes her for her thoughtlessness regarding Boldwood, she dismisses him from his job.

When Bathsheba's sheep begin dying from bloat, she discovers to her chagrin that Gabriel is the only man who knows how to cure them. Her pride delays the inevitable, but eventually she is forced to beg him for help. Afterward, she offers him back his job, and their friendship is restored.

=== Sergeant Troy ===
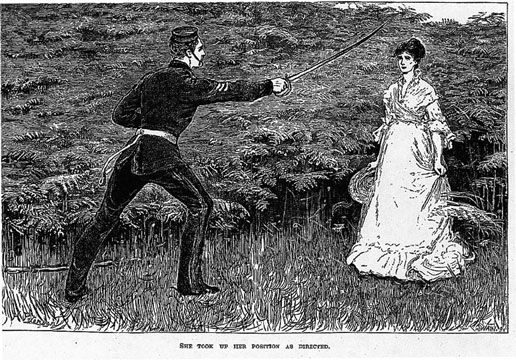
"She took up her position as directed." Troy courts Bathsheba; Cornhill illustration by Helen Paterson Allingham

At this point, Sergeant Francis "Frank" Troy returns to his native Weatherbury and by chance encounters Bathsheba one night. Her initial dislike turns to infatuation after he excites her with a private display of swordsmanship. Gabriel observes Bathsheba's interest in the young soldier and tries to discourage it, telling her she would be better off marrying Boldwood. Boldwood becomes aggressive towards Troy, and Bathsheba goes to Bath to prevent Troy returning to Weatherbury, as she fears what might happen if Troy encountered Boldwood. On their return, Boldwood offers his rival a large bribe to give up Bathsheba. Troy pretends to consider the offer, then scornfully announces they are already married. Boldwood withdraws, humiliated, and vows revenge.

Bathsheba discovers that her future husband is an improvident gambler with little interest in farming. She also begins to suspect he does not love her. In fact, Troy's heart belongs to Bathsheba's former servant, Fanny Robin. Before meeting Bathsheba, Troy had promised to marry Fanny; on the wedding day, however, Fanny goes to the wrong church. She explains her mistake, but Troy, humiliated at being left at the altar, calls off the wedding. When they part, unbeknownst to Troy, Fanny is pregnant with his child.

=== Fanny Robin ===
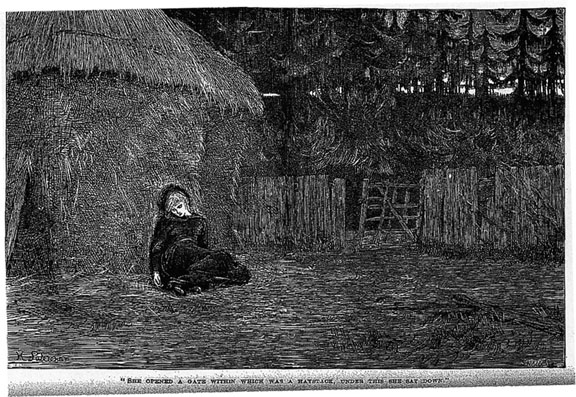
Fanny Robin on her way to the Casterbridge workhouse. Cornhill illustration by Helen Paterson Allingham

Months later, Troy and Bathsheba encounter the frail Fanny on the road, destitute, as she painfully makes her way toward the Casterbridge workhouse. Troy sends his wife onward, then gives Fanny all the money in his pocket, telling her he will give her more in a few days. Fanny uses up the last of her strength to reach her destination. Hours later, she dies in childbirth, along with the baby. Mother and child are then placed in a coffin and sent home to Weatherbury to be buried. Gabriel, who knows of Troy's relationship with Fanny, tries to conceal the child's existence – but Bathsheba agrees that the coffin can be left in her house overnight, from her sense of duty towards a former servant. Her servant and confidante, Liddy, repeats the rumour that Fanny had a child; when all the servants are in bed, Bathsheba unscrews the lid and sees the two bodies inside.

Troy then comes home from Casterbridge, where he had gone to keep his appointment with Fanny. Seeing the reason for her failure to meet him a second time, he tenderly kisses the corpse and tells the anguished Bathsheba, "This woman is more to me, dead as she is, than ever you were, or are, or can be". The next day he spends all his money on a marble tombstone with the inscription: "Erected by Francis Troy in beloved memory of Fanny Robin ..." Then, loathing himself and unable to bear Bathsheba's company, he leaves. After a long walk, he bathes in the sea, leaving his clothes on the beach. A strong current carries him away, but he is rescued by some men in a boat. He does not return home, however.

=== Troy returns ===
A year later, with Troy presumed drowned, Boldwood renews his suit. Burdened with guilt over the pain she has caused him, Bathsheba reluctantly consents to marry him in six years, long enough to have Troy declared dead. Boldwood begins counting the days, going so far as to buy (but not deliver) gifts for Bathsheba on special days.

Troy tires of his hand-to-mouth existence as a travelling actor and considers reclaiming his position and wife. He returns to Weatherbury on Christmas Eve and goes to Boldwood's house, where a party is under way. He orders Bathsheba to come with him; when she shrinks back in shock and dismay, he seizes her arm, and she screams. At this, Boldwood shoots Troy dead and tries unsuccessfully to turn the double-barrelled gun on himself. Although Boldwood is convicted of murder and sentenced to be hanged, his friends petition the Home Secretary for mercy, claiming insanity. This is granted, and Boldwood's sentence is commuted to "confinement during Her Majesty's pleasure". Bathsheba buries her husband in the same grave as Fanny Robin and their child.

=== Gabriel triumphant ===
Throughout her tribulations, Bathsheba comes to rely increasingly on her oldest and, as she admits to herself, only real friend, Gabriel. When he gives notice that he is leaving her employ, she realises how important he has become to her well-being. That night, she goes alone to visit him in his cottage to find out why he is deserting her. Pressed, he reluctantly reveals that it is because people have been gossiping that he wants to marry her. She exclaims that it is "... too absurd – too soon – to think of, by far!" He bitterly agrees that it is absurd, but she corrects him, tearfully, saying that it is only "too soon." Emboldened, Gabriel says if he only knew if she would marry him, and she replies that he will never know, because he never asks. At this, they become engaged, and later, are quietly married.

== Title ==
Hardy took the title from Thomas Gray's poem "Elegy Written in a Country Churchyard" (1751):

Far from the madding crowd's ignoble strife
Their sober wishes never learn'd to stray;
Along the cool sequester'd vale of life
They kept the noiseless tenor of their way.

"Madding" here means "frenzied".

Lucasta Miller points out that the title is an ironic literary joke, as Gray is idealising noiseless and sequestered calm, whereas Hardy "disrupts the idyll, and not just by introducing the sound and fury of an extreme plot ... he is out to subvert his readers' complacency".

== Hardy's Wessex ==
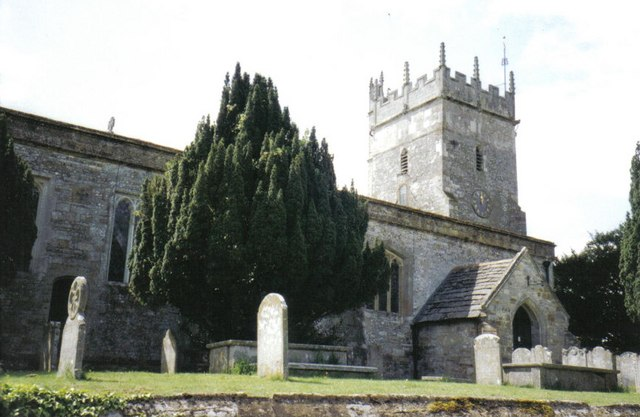
Weatherbury Church (Puddletown)

Thomas Hardy's Wessex was first mentioned in Far from the Madding Crowd; describing the "partly real, partly dream-country" that unifies his novels of southwest England. Far from the Madding Crowd offers in ample measure the details of English rural life that Hardy so relished.

He found the word in the pages of early English history as a designation for an extinct, pre-Norman Conquest kingdom, the Wessex from which Alfred the Great established England. In the first edition, the word "Wessex" is used only once, in chapter 50; Hardy extended the reference for the 1895 edition. Hardy himself wrote: "I am reminded that it was in the chapters of Far from the Madding Crowd… that I first ventured to adopt the word 'Wessex' from the pages of early English history... – a modern Wessex of railways, the penny post, mowing and reaping machines, union workhouses, lucifer matches, labourers who could read and write, and National school children".

Puddletown's parish church has significant architectural interest, particularly its furnishings and monuments. It has a 12th-century font and well-preserved woodwork, including 17th-century box pews. Hardy took an interest in the church, and the village provided the inspiration for the fictional settlement of Weatherbury In The Mayor of Casterbridge, Hardy briefly mentions two characters from Far from the Madding Crowd – Farmer Everdene and Farmer Boldwood, both in happier days.

== Adaptations ==
=== Radio ===
The novel was adapted by Graham White in 2012 into a three-part series on BBC Radio 4's Classic Serial. The production was directed by Jessica Dromgoole and featured Alex Tregear as Bathsheba, Shaun Dooley as Gabriel, Toby Jones as Boldwood and Patrick Kennedy as Troy.

=== Comics ===
The novel was adapted by Posy Simmonds into Tamara Drewe, weekly comic strip that ran from September 2005 to October 2006 in The Guardian's Review section. The strip, a modern reworking of the novel, was itself adapted into a film, Tamara Drewe (2010), directed by Stephen Frears.

=== Film ===
- Far from the Madding Crowd (1915) directed by Laurence Trimble, starring Florence Turner and Henry Edwards. This is a lost film.
- Far from the Madding Crowd (1967) directed by John Schlesinger, starring Julie Christie as Bathsheba Everdene, Terence Stamp as Sergeant Troy, Peter Finch as Mr Boldwood, and Alan Bates as Farmer Oak.
- Far from the Madding Crowd (1998) ITV UK television adaption directed by Nicholas Renton, starring Paloma Baeza, Nathaniel Parker, Jonathan Firth and Nigel Terry.
- Tamara Drewe (2010), a British romantic comedy film directed by Stephen Frears and based on the newspaper comic strip of the same name, which was a modern reworking of Far from the Madding Crowd, starring Gemma Arterton and Luke Evans as analogues of Bathsheba and Gabriel.
- Far from the Madding Crowd (2015) directed by Thomas Vinterberg, screenplay by David Nicholls, with Carey Mulligan as Bathsheba Everdene, Matthias Schoenaerts as Farmer Oak, Michael Sheen as Mr Boldwood, Tom Sturridge as Sergeant Troy and Juno Temple as Fanny Robin.

=== Stage productions ===
In 1879, Hardy adapted the novel under the title "The Mistress of the Farm: A Pastoral Drama". When J. Comyns Carr suggested something similar, Hardy gave him his version, which he said Carr "modified… in places, to suit modern carpentry &c". Hardy's experience of adapting a novel for the theatre was soured by controversy – the managers of the St James's Theatre, London, John Hare and William Hunter Kendal, on reading the Comyns Carr/Hardy adaptation, first accepted it and then rejected it; instead staging Arthur Wing Pinero's play The Squire, which appeared to be heavily plagiarised from the earlier script. This enraged Comyns Carr and, to a lesser extent, Hardy. Prompted by Comyns Carr, Hardy wrote indignant letters to The Times and the Daily News. Comyns Carr/Hardy's version was finally staged at the Royal Court Theatre in Liverpool, where it opened on 27 February 1882 as Far from The Madding Crowd, with Marion Terry as Bathsheba and Charles Kelly as Oak. The reviews were mixed, one critic calling their adaptation "a miniature melodrama… well placed in the provinces", while praising The Squire's appeal to "spectators of somewhat refined taste". The production subsequently transferred to the Globe Theatre in London, opening on 29 April 1882, presenting a similar cast, but with Mrs Bernard Beere now playing Bathsheba.

Inspired by these performances, a further, clumsy cut-and-paste version, of the novel was performed in America shortly afterwards, at the Union Square Theatre, New York in April 1882. The play was panned: according to the theatre reviewer for the American journal Spirit of the Times, it was unfair "to Thomas Hardy, to the public, and to Miss Morris, although she got even by spoiling the play after Mr Cazauran had spoiled the novel". This experience made Hardy wary of theatrical adaptations and the potential risk to his reputation both from authorised adaptations and from unauthorised ones.

In 1909, Harold Evans adapted the novel, with Hardy's input, for The Hardy Players, Hardy's own amateur theatrical society, formed in 1908 to perform a production of The Trumpet-Major. As Harold Evans' daughter Evelyn wrote: "This pastoral romance presented more difficult problems of staging; sheep had to be sheared on stage in the great barn; the big shearing supper was essential; Boldwood’s Christmas party had to be staged, too, with its tragic climax, the shooting of Troy by the half-crazed Boldwood. Mr T. H. Tilley, a builder by trade, and a most gifted comedian, conquered all these staging difficulties. He constructed a model theatre (now in the possession of Mr Edward Grassby) with designs for each set, so that the Weatherbury (Puddletown) landscape could be faithfully portrayed. A painting of Waterston House formed one backcloth; meadows, fir plantations, house interiors, the others. Mr Tilley’s rich humour in the part of Joseph Poorgrass delighted Hardy and the audience. My father often chuckled over how Joseph, in his cups, declared, 'I feel too good for England. I ought to have lived in Genesis by right.'” In the 1909 production, one important scene had to be omitted. Much to Hardy's regret, the opening of Fanny Robin's coffin by Bathsheba and her reaction to it could not be staged. At that time, having a coffin on the stage was seen as too shocking. "Years later", wrote Evelyn Evans, "when Hardy attended a performance of Synge’s Riders to the Sea by the Arts League of Service, and watched drowned bodies carried on to the stage, he remarked wryly that his one coffin containing Fanny Robin and her child could hardly have shocked the same audience". There was also some unexpected comedy gold in the 1909 production. Evelyn Evans describes it thus: "To make this pastoral play true to life, my father engaged a professional sheep-shearer to shear sheep on stage during the important shearing scene. Everything was to be done as Hardy described it: 'The lopping off the tresses about the ewe’s head, opening up the neck and collar, the running of the shears line after line round her dewlap, thence about her flank and back, and finishing over her tail – the clean, sleek creature arising from its fleece: startled and shy at the loss of its garment, which lay on the floor in one soft cloud.' The shearer, complaining of thirst, was given unlimited free beer at his task, with the result that above the actors' voices could be heard a maudlin song, as the shearer sang to the sheep he was fondly kissing and clipping with expertise, becoming, unfortunately, drunker and drunker to father's great consternation".

The novel was adapted as a ballet in 1996 by David Bintley for the Birmingham Royal Ballet, a musical in 2000 by Gary Schocker, and an opera in 2006 by Andrew Downes.

New stage adaptations were performed in autumn 2008 by the English Touring Theatre (ETT), directed by Kate Saxon, in March 2013 by Myriad Theatre & Film, and in 2019 by the New Hardy Players (re-formed at the request of Norrie Woodhall).

In 2011 Roger Holman wrote a musical adaptation of "Far From the Madding Crowd".

== References in popular culture ==
=== Anime ===
- Episode 20 of the anime Kill la Kill is titled "Far from the Madding Crowd".

=== Music ===
- British musician Paul McCartney, included the lyric "When I fly above the Maddening Crowd" on the song "3 Legs" from his 1971 release Ram.
- British musician Nick Bracegirdle, better known as Chicane, released Far from the Maddening Crowds, a studio album, in 1997.
- In 2000, the New York rock band Nine Days titled their debut The Madding Crowd to express their allegiance to modernity in opposition to Hardy.
- The Danish metal band Wuthering Heights released a studio album titled Far From the Madding Crowd in 2004.
- Nanci Griffith included the lyric "You're a Saturday night, Far from the madding crowd" in the song On Grafton Street on her 1994 release Flyer.
- Róisín Murphy included the lyric "Far from the madding crowd, something's stirring within me" in the song Jealousy on her 2020 release Róisín Machine.
- In 2021, Pete Doherty released the album The Fantasy Life of Poetry and Crime in collaboration with the French musician Frédéric Lo. Its final track is titled "Far from the Madding Crowd".

=== Literature ===
- The city of Far Madding in Robert Jordan's The Wheel of Time series of fantasy novels is named after Hardy's book.
- The heroine of Suzanne Collins's The Hunger Games series, Katniss Everdeen, gets her last name from Bathsheba Everdene.

=== Horticulture ===
- David Austin Roses has several roses named after characters created by Hardy. In 2016, the company introduced Rosa 'Bathsheba' (apricot), named for the character from Far From the Madding Crowd. Three years later, the company introduced both Rosa 'Eustacia Vye' (apricot-pink), named for the character from The Return of the Native, and Rosa 'Gabriel Oak' (magenta-purple), named for the character from Far From the Madding Crowd. They were both introduced as part of the company's display at the Chelsea Flower Show in 2019, and helped win David Austin Roses its 25th Gold Medal there.
