= Gemma Bovery =

1999 graphic novel by Posy Simmonds

- First edition cover
- Author: Posy Simmonds
- Publisher: Jonathan Cape
- Publication date: 1999
- Pages: 106
- ISBN: 978-0-224-05251-1

Gemma Bovery (ISBN 0-2240-6114-3) is a graphic novel by British writer and cartoonist Posy Simmonds. Originally published as a serial in The Guardian, it was published in book form in 1999. It is the tragicomic story of the life and death of an English expatriate in Normandy, drawing many parallels to Gustave Flaubert's 1857 novel Madame Bovary.

== Plot summary ==
The story opens with Raymond Joubert, a baker in the (fictional) Bailleville, near Rouen in Normandy, reflecting on the recent death of Gemma Bovery, an English woman who lived in the village. Joubert blames himself for her death. During a visit to Gemma's widower Charlie, Joubert discovers that Gemma kept a journal, which Charlie has not had the heart to read. Anxious about what the journal may reveal, Joubert steals several of the most recent volumes.

Using the journal and personal recollection, Joubert tells the story of Gemma's final few months:

Magazine illustrator Gemma Tate has just been dumped by her supercilious lover Patrick Large and is taken in by kindly but impoverished furniture restorer Charlie Bovery, whom she soon marries. Depressed by London life and infuriated by the demands made by Charlie's shrewish ex-wife Judi, Gemma persuades Charlie to sell up and move to Bailleville in Normandy.

Gemma's initial delight at her simple new life soon gives way to ennui: their crumbling cottage is smelly and uncomfortable, and Charlie (who settles in Normandy far better) maddens her with his laid-back attitude to everything. Despite doing some piece work for rich, boorish neighbours Mark and Wizzy Rankin, the Boverys are soon considerably in debt.

The sensual Gemma has made a considerable impact in Bailleville: The pompous baker Joubert is soon obsessed with her and while following her one night discovers she is having an affair with Hervé de Bressigny, the son of a local landed family. Enraged with jealousy and disturbed by the uncanny parallels between Gemma's life and that of the heroine of Flaubert's Madame Bovary, Joubert anonymously sends Gemma some photocopied extracts from the book as a warning that she may suffer the same fate as Emma Bovary.

Hervé, terrified of the impact the affair may have on his relationship with his family and girlfriend, soon breaks off the affair. Despite this, Gemma has been energised by the affair and starts to take up the illustrating assignments she had abandoned and is able to start earning good money again. Unfortunately this is not enough to sustain the massive spending spree she undertakes to transform her own appearance and that of the cottage. Charlie, meanwhile, returns to England having found out about Gemma's affair and being appalled by it.

Gemma's old lover Patrick turns up in Normandy as a guest of his friends the Rankins - he has been thrown out of his house by his wife Pandora (for whom he left Gemma). Gemma, unable to resist, has sex with him (again witnessed by the furious Joubert) but then realises to her delight that she is now able to resist his charms. She writes to Charlie, asking for his forgiveness, realising he is the steadying influence her life needs.

Gemma finds out that it was Joubert who sent her the pages from Madame Bovary and reacts with fury. Mortified with guilt, Joubert sends her a peace offering of freshly baked bread. As she is eating this, she is visited by Patrick, whom she rejects again. However she starts to choke on the bread. Patrick desperately tries the Heimlich maneuver but is disturbed by Charlie, who has just returned from England prompted by Gemma's letter. Charlie misreads the scene and attacks Patrick. As they struggle, Patrick desperately trying to tell Charlie what is really happening, Gemma dies.

Furnished with all the facts, Joubert realises his culpability in Gemma's death is small although he is still concerned about Charlie as in Madame Bovary Charles Bovary dies soon after his wife. He is relieved when Charlie reveals his real (never used) name is Cyril.

In the epilogue, Joubert observes as a new couple moves into the Boverys' house: an older man and his wife, named Jane Eyre.

== Film adaptation ==
In 2014 the comic book was adapted into a feature live-action film: Gemma Bovery, directed by Anne Fontaine.

== See also ==
- List of feminist comic books
- Portrayal of women in comics
