= Gemma Bovery (film) =

2014 film

- Film poster
- Directed by: Anne Fontaine
- Screenplay by: Pascal Bonitzer; Anne Fontaine
- Based on: Gemma Bovery by Posy Simmonds
- Produced by: Philippe Carcassonne; Matthieu Tarot; Sidonie Dumas
- Starring: Fabrice Luchini; Gemma Arterton; Jason Flemying; Isabelle Candelier; Niels Schneider; Mel Raido; Pip Torrens; Kacey Mottet Klein; Édith Scob; Pascale Arbillot; Elsa Zylberstein
- Cinematography: Christophe Beaucarne
- Edited by: Annette Dutertre
- Music by: Bruno Coulais
- Production companies: Albertine Productions; Ciné@; Gaumont
- Distributed by: Gaumont
- Release dates: 24 August 2014 (Festival du Film Francophone d'Angoulême); 10 September 2014 (France)
- Running time: 99 minutes
- Country: France
- Languages: French; English
- Budget: $11 million
- Box office: $4.6 million

Gemma Bovery is a 2014 French comedy-drama film based on Posy Simmonds' 1999 graphic novel of the same name. Directed by Anne Fontaine, the film stars Gemma Arterton, Jason Flemyng, Mel Raido and Fabrice Luchini. The film premiered at the 2014 Festival du Film Francophone d'Angoulême on 24 August 2014, and showed in the Special Presentations section at the Toronto International Film Festival on 6 September 2014.

== Plot ==
Martin, an ex-Parisian with a deep appreciation for Gustave Flaubert, has settled in a village in Normandy as a baker. He sees a British couple moving into an old property across the road. Their names, Gemma and Charles Bovery, echo those of the leading characters in Flaubert's 1856 masterpiece Madame Bovary. Martin engages with the young couple and observes that Gemma's behaviour replicates that of her namesake, including romantic and sexual liaisons that suggest she is headed for a tragic finale like that of the novel. He intervenes but cannot alter the inevitable.

== Cast ==
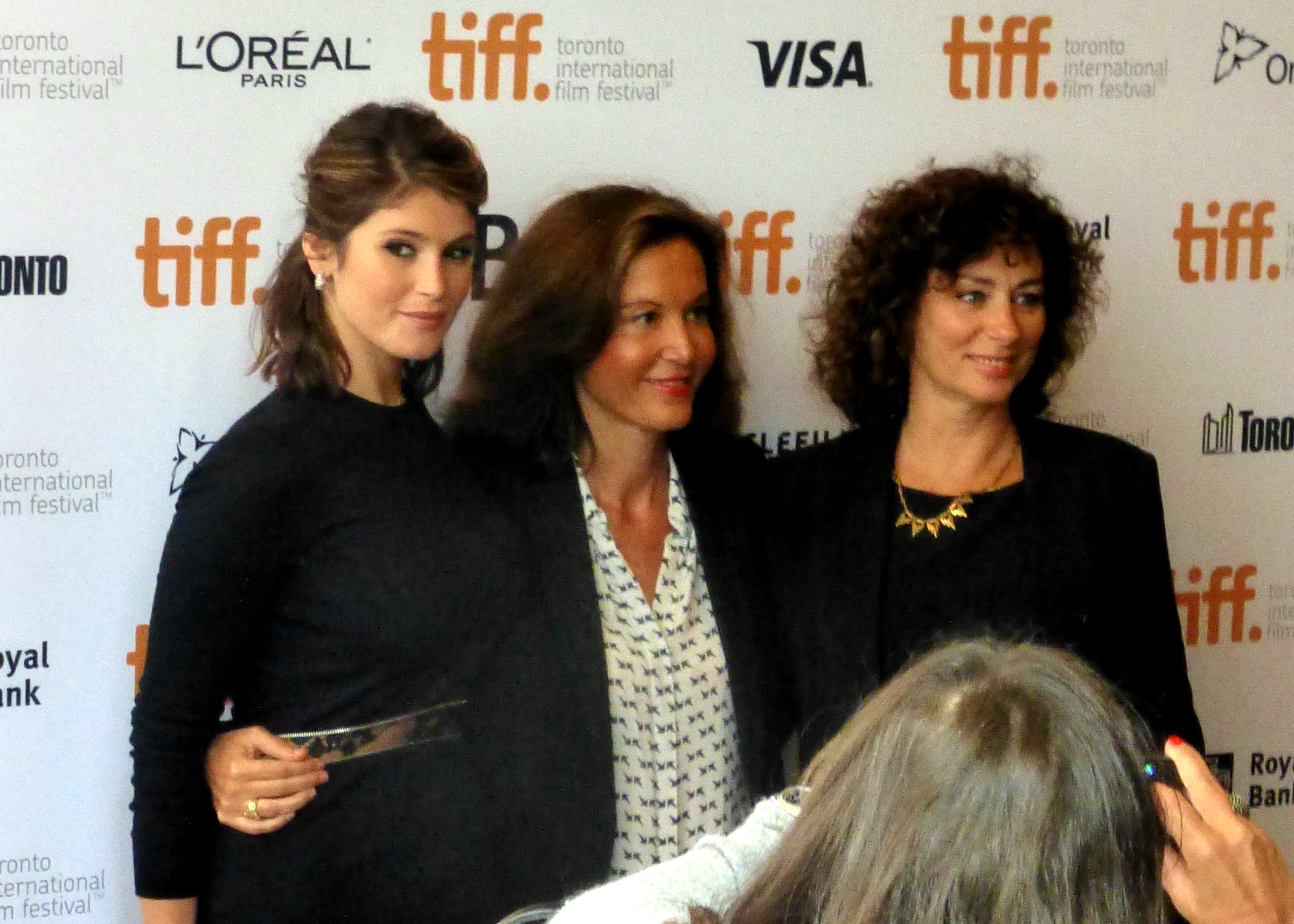
Gemma Arterton, Anne Fontaine, and Isabelle Candelier promoting the film at the 2014 Toronto Film Festival.

- Fabrice Luchini as Martin Joubert
- Gemma Arterton as Gemma Bovery
- Jason Flemyng as Charlie Bovery, Gemma's new husband
- Mel Raido as Patrick, Gemma's ex-boyfriend and a charming food critic
- Isabelle Candelier as Valérie Joubert
- Niels Schneider as Hervé de Bressigny
- Elsa Zylberstein as Wizzy
- Pip Torrens as Rankin
- Kacey Mottet Klein as Julien Joubert
- Édith Scob as Madame de Bressigny
- Pascale Arbillot as The new neighbour

== Production ==
=== Pre-production ===
Anne Fontaine confirmed in early 2013 that she would direct the film with Philippe Carcassonne and Faye Ward producing it.

=== Filming ===
Principal photography took place in the summer and autumn of 2013 in France.

== Reception ==
As of July 2020, the film holds a 54% approval rating on review aggregation website Rotten Tomatoes, based on 90 reviews, with an average score of 5.99/10. The site's consensus reads, "Gemma Bovery's bursts of charm -- among them Gemma Arterton's winsome performance in the title role -- are often enough to compensate for its lack of focus.". At Metacritic, which assigns a rating out of 100 to reviews from mainstream critics, the film received an average score of 58, based on 27 reviews, indicating "mixed or average reviews".
