= Delphine Delamare =

French housewife, literary inspiration (1822–1848)

Véronique Delphine Delamare
- Born: 1822
- Died: 1848 (aged 25–26)

Véronique Delphine Delamare (born Couturier; 17 February 1822 – 8 March 1848) was a French housewife who took numerous lovers and later committed suicide. She was said to have been the inspiration for Gustave Flaubert's 1857 novel Madame Bovary.

== Biography ==
Delamare was the daughter of a wealthy land owner Jean Baptiste Couturier and Madeleine Veronique Leroux of Blainville-Crevon. She met the widowed Eugene Delamare (b. 1812) whose first wife Louise Mutel had died in 1837, and married him in 1839 as his second wife. The couple's daughter Lucie was born in 1842.

Delamare, soon finding herself being bored with her life as a country doctor's wife, took various lovers and when this was discovered she committed suicide by taking prussic acid (known today as hydrogen cyanide). Her husband died (or committed suicide) the following year.

The couple's now orphaned daughter, contrary to the fate of her literary counterpart Berthe, grew up and married a pharmacist.

An article published in 1848 in the Journal de Rouen told about Doctor Delamare's wife's death in the village of Ry near Rouen, where the house of the Delamares and the tombstone of Delphine Delamare are still to be seen.

Delamare's adulterous affairs, debts, and suicide were the inspiration for the character of Emma Bovary in Gustave Flaubert's Madame Bovary in 1857. Her husband, Eugène Delamare, had been a medical student of Flaubert's father.
