= Madame Bovary =

1857 novel by Gustave Flaubert

Madame Bovary: Provincial Manners
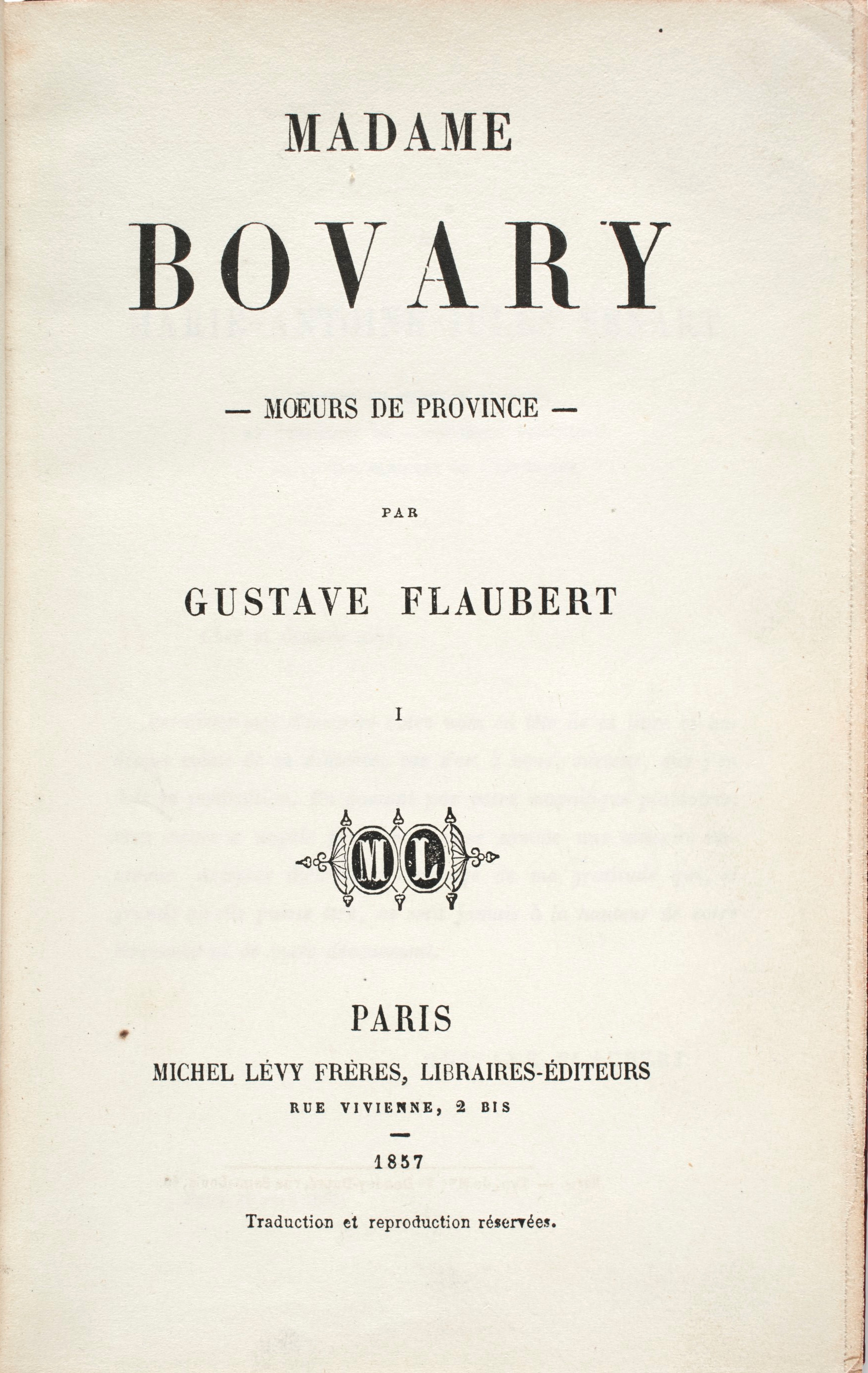
- Title page of the original French edition, 1857
- Author: Gustave Flaubert
- Original title: Madame Bovary: Mœurs de province
- Translator: Eleanor Marx (1886)
- Language: French
- Genre: Realist novel
- Publisher: Revue de Paris (in serial) & Michel Lévy Frères (in book form, 2 Vols)
- Publication date: 1 October - 15 December 1856 (in serial) & 12 April 1857 (in book form)
- Publication place: France
- Original text: Madame Bovary: Mœurs de province at French Wikisource
- Translation: Madame Bovary: Provincial Manners at Wikisource

Madame Bovary: Provincial Manners (French: Madame Bovary : Mœurs de province, pronounced [madam bɔvaʁi mœʁ(s) də pʁɔvɛ̃s]), commonly known as simply Madame Bovary, (Note: /ˈboʊvəri/ BOH-və-ree) is the debut novel of French writer Gustave Flaubert, originally published in 1856 and 1857. The eponymous character, Emma Bovary, lives beyond her means in order to escape the ennui of provincial life.

When the novel was first serialised in Revue de Paris between 1 October and 15 December 1856, public prosecutors attacked it on the grounds that it was obscene. The resulting trial in January 1857 rendered it notorious. Following Flaubert's acquittal on 7 February 1857, Madame Bovary became a bestseller in April 1857 when it was published in two volumes. The novel was translated into English by Eleanor Marx in 1886. A seminal work of literary realism, the novel is ranked among Flaubert's masterpieces, and one of the most influential literary works in history.

== Plot ==
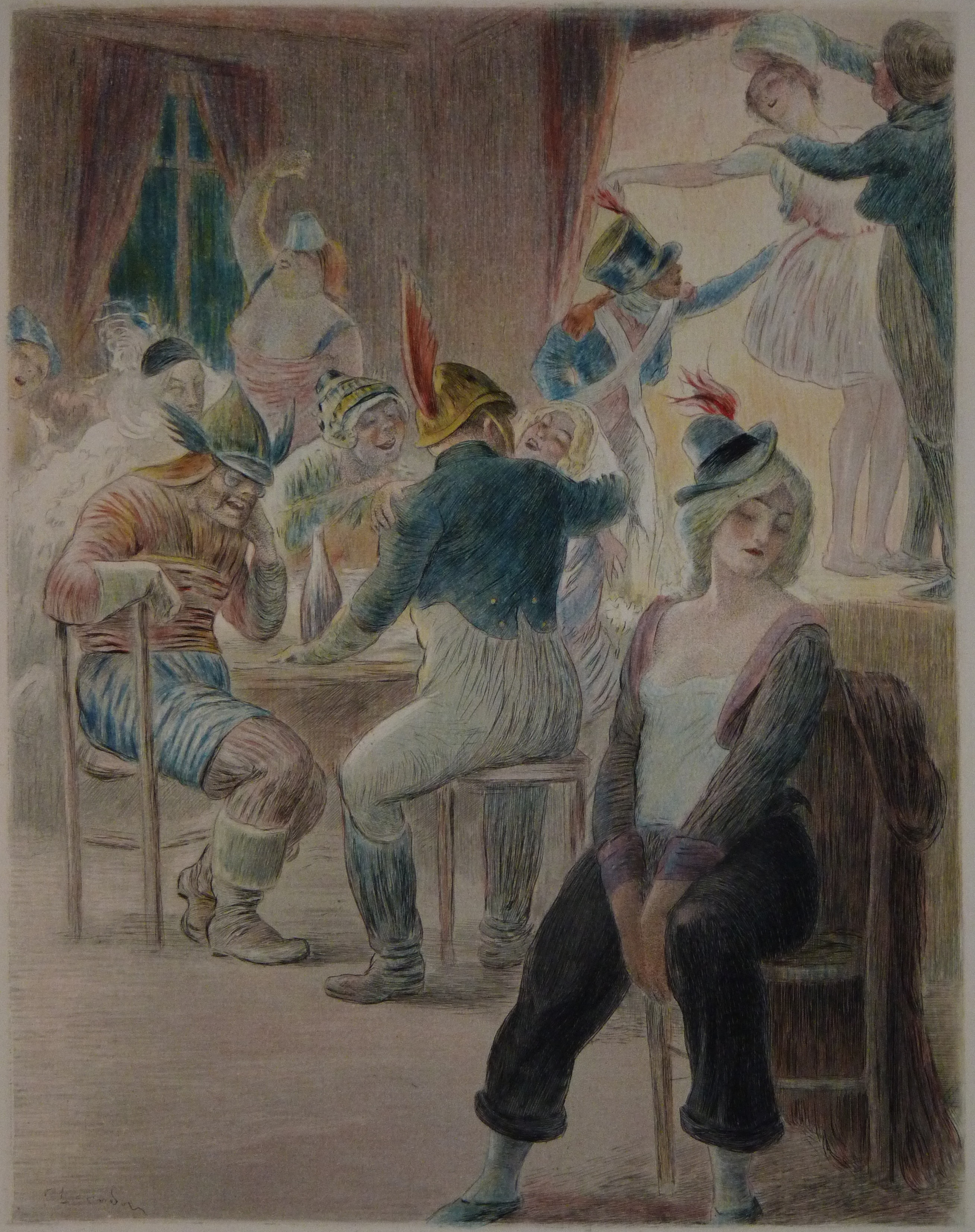
Illustration by Charles Léandre Madame Bovary, engraved by Eugène Decisy. (Illustration without text on page 322: Emma in male costume at the ball)

Charles Bovary is a shy, oddly dressed teenager who does poorly in medical school, and becomes not a physician, but rather an Officier de santé in the Public Health Service. He marries the woman his mother has chosen for him, the unpleasant but supposedly rich widow Héloïse Dubuc. He sets out to build a practice in the village of Tostes in the Seine-Inférieure department of the Normandy region.

One day, Charles visits a local farm to set the broken leg of its owner, Théodore Rouault, and meets his daughter, Emma, a beautiful, convent-educated, poetically-dressed young woman who has a yearning for luxury and romance inspired by reading popular novels. Charles is immediately attracted to her, and when Héloïse dies, Charles waits a decent interval before courting Emma in earnest. Her father gives his consent, and Emma and Charles marry.

After a fancy ball where she dances with a Vicomte, Emma finds her married life dull and becomes listless. Charles decides that she needs a change of scenery and moves his practice to the larger market town of Yonville-l'Abbaye, where Emma gives birth to a daughter, Berthe, but motherhood proves a disappointment to Emma. She becomes infatuated with Léon Dupuis, a law student who shares Emma's appreciation of literature and music. Emma does not fully act upon her passion for Léon, who departs for Paris to continue his studies. Emma ambitiously hopes Charles will gain a higher local reputation when he tries an innovative operation to cure a local inn-servant, Hippolyte, of his clubfoot, but the procedure goes disastrously and Hippolyte's leg must be amputated. Emma holds Charles in utter contempt.

Next, Emma begins an affair with a rich and rakish landowner, Rodolphe Boulanger. After four years, she insists they run away together. Rodolphe does not share her enthusiasm for this plan, and on the eve of their planned departure, he ends the relationship with a letter placed at the bottom of a basket of apricots delivered to Emma. The shock is so great that Emma falls deathly ill and briefly returns to religion.

When Emma recovers, she and Charles attend the opera, at Charles' insistence, in nearby Rouen. The opera reawakens Emma's passions, and she re-encounters Léon who, now educated and working in Rouen, is also attending the opera. They begin an affair. Emma indulges her fancy for luxury goods and clothes with purchases made on credit from the merchant Lheureux, who arranges for her to obtain power of attorney over Charles' estate.

When Lheureux calls in Bovary's debt, Emma pleads for money from several people, only to be turned down, even by Rodolphe. In despair, she swallows arsenic and dies an agonizing death. Charles, heartbroken, abandons himself to grief, stops working, and lives by selling off his possessions. When he dies, his young daughter Berthe is placed with her grandmother, who soon dies. Berthe lives with an impoverished aunt, who sends her to work in a cotton mill.

The book concludes with Yonville's local pharmacist Homais, a corrupt social climber who had competed with Charles' medical practice, gaining prominence and being rewarded for his supposed medical achievements: The last line of the novel reveals that he was awarded the Legion of Honour.

== Characters ==
- Emma Bovary (née Rouault) is the novel's eponymous protagonist. Owing to her obsession with sentimental novels, she has a highly romanticised view of the world and hedonistically craves beauty, wealth, passion, as well as high society. She is the daughter of Théodore Rouault, an elderly farmer and one of Charles' patients.
- Charles Bovary is a humble health officer whose first wife, Héloïse Dubuc dies early on in the novel. Having treated her father and befriended the family, he marries Emma Rouault following a period of mourning for Héloïse.
- Berthe Bovary is the infant daughter of Charles and Emma.
- Rodolphe Boulanger is a local wealthy man. He seduces Emma as one in a long string of mistresses.
- Léon Dupuis is a clerk with a love for the arts: musical, literary, and visual. He introduces Emma to poetry and falls in love with her.
- Monsieur Lheureux is a sly merchant. He lends money to Charles and leads the family into debt and financial ruin.
- Monsieur Homais is the cynical and hypocritical town pharmacist, known for malpractice and corruption.
- Justin is Monsieur Homais' apprentice and second cousin who is infatuated with Emma.

== Style ==
The book was in some ways inspired by the life of a schoolfriend of the author who became a doctor. Flaubert's friend and mentor, Louis Bouilhet, had suggested to him that this might be a suitably "down-to-earth" subject for a novel and that Flaubert should attempt to write in a "natural way," without digressions. The writing style was of supreme importance to Flaubert. While writing the novel, he wrote that it would be "a book about nothing, a book dependent on nothing external, which would be held together by the internal strength of its style", an aim which, for the critic Jean Rousset, made Flaubert "the first in date of the non-figurative novelists", such as James Joyce and Virginia Woolf. Though Flaubert avowed no liking for the style of Balzac, the novel he produced became arguably a prime example and an enhancement of literary realism in the vein of Balzac. The "realism" in the novel was to prove an important element in the trial for obscenity: the lead prosecutor argued that not only was the novel immoral, but that realism in literature was an offence against art and decency.

The realist movement was, in part, a reaction against romanticism. Emma may be said to be the embodiment of a romantic: in her mental and emotional process, she has no relation to the realities of her world. Although in some ways he may seem to identify with Emma, Flaubert frequently mocks her romantic daydreaming and taste in literature. The accuracy of Flaubert's supposed assertion that "Madame Bovary, c'est moi" ("Madame Bovary is me") has been questioned. In his letters, he distanced himself from the sentiments in the novel. To Edma Roger des Genettes, he wrote, "Tout ce que j'aime n'y est pas" ("all that I love is not there") and to Marie-Sophie Leroyer de Chantepie, "je n'y ai rien mis ni de mes sentiments ni de mon existence" ("I have used nothing of my feelings or of my life"). For Mario Vargas Llosa, "If Emma Bovary had not read all those novels, it is possible that her fate might have been different."

Madame Bovary has been seen as a commentary on the bourgeoisie, the folly of aspirations that can never be realized or a belief in the validity of a self-satisfied, deluded personal culture, associated with Flaubert's period, especially during the reign of Louis Philippe, when the middle class grew to become more identifiable in contrast to the working class and the nobility. Flaubert despised the bourgeoisie. In his Dictionary of Received Ideas, the bourgeoisie is characterized by intellectual and spiritual superficiality, raw ambition, shallow culture, a love of material things, greed, and above all a mindless parroting of sentiments and beliefs.

For Vargas Llosa, "Emma's drama is the gap between illusion and reality, the distance between desire and its fulfillment" and shows "the first signs of alienation that a century later will take hold of men and women in industrial societies."

== Literary significance and reception ==
Long established as one of the greatest novels, the book has been highly praised by a wide variety of writers. Henry James wrote: "Madame Bovary has a perfection that not only stamps it, but that makes it stand almost alone: it holds itself with such a supreme unapproachable assurance as both excites and defies judgment." Marcel Proust praised the "grammatical purity" of Flaubert's style, while Vladimir Nabokov said that "stylistically it is prose doing what poetry is supposed to do". Similarly, in his preface to his novel The Joke, Milan Kundera wrote, "not until the work of Flaubert did prose lose the stigma of aesthetic inferiority. Ever since Madame Bovary, the art of the novel has been considered equal to the art of poetry." Giorgio de Chirico said that in his opinion "from the narrative point of view, the most perfect book is Madame Bovary by Flaubert". Julian Barnes called it the best novel that has ever been written.

The novel exemplifies the tendency of realism, over the course of the nineteenth century, to become increasingly psychological, concerned with the accurate representation of thoughts and emotions rather than of external things. Thus it prefigures the work of modernist novelists Marcel Proust, Virginia Woolf and James Joyce.

The book was controversial upon its release: its scandalous subject matter led to an obscenity trial in 1857. Flaubert was acquitted. Le Figaro was critical of the work. They stated, "Monsieur Flaubert is not a writer."

== English translations ==
The first to attempt a translation was Juliet Herbert, who worked closely with the author. For lack of a publishing contract, Flaubert dropped the project.

=== Abridged ===
1. George Saintsbury published an essay containing translations of excerpts from the novel in 1878.
2. Henry Blanchamp (1905)
3. Joan Charles (1949)

=== Unabridged in public domain ===
1. Mary Neal Sherwood under the pseudonym John Stirling (1881)
2. Eleanor Marx (1886)
3. J. Lewis May (1928)

=== Unabridged in copyright ===
1. Gerard Hopkins (1948)
2. Alan Russell (1950)
3. Francis Steegmuller (1957)
4. Mildred Marmur (1964)
5. Paul de Man (1965)
6. Merloyd Lawrence (1969)
7. Geoffrey Wall (1992)
8. Margaret Mauldon (2004)
9. Lydia Davis (2010)
10. Christopher Moncrieff (2010)
11. Adam Thorpe (2011)

== Adaptations ==
=== Film and television ===
- Unholy Love (1932), directed by Albert Ray
- Madame Bovary (1934), directed by Jean Renoir and starring Max Dearly and Valentine Tessier
- Madame Bovary (1937), directed by Gerhard Lamprecht and starring Pola Negri, Aribert Wäscher and Ferdinand Marian
- Madame Bovary (1947), directed by Carlos Schlieper and starring Mecha Ortiz, Roberto Escalada, Enrique Diosdado and Alberto Bello
- Madame Bovary (1949), directed by Vincente Minnelli and starring Jennifer Jones, James Mason, Van Heflin, Louis Jourdan and Gene Lockhart
- Madame Bovary (1964), a BBC TV series written by Giles Cooper
- Madame Bovary (1969), directed by Hans Schott-Schöbinger and starring Edwige Fenech
- Madame Bovary (1975), a BBC TV series that used the same script as that of 1964
- Save and Protect (1989), directed by Alexandr Sokurov
- Madame Bovary (1991), directed by Claude Chabrol, and starring Isabelle Huppert in 1991
- Maya Memsaab (1993), a Hindi-language film, directed by Ketan Mehta and starring Deepa Sahi
- Madame Bovary (2000), a TV series written by Heidi Thomas, a WGBH production for BBC
- Madame Bovary (2014), directed by Sophie Barthes and starring Mia Wasikowska, Henry Lloyd-Hughes, Paul Giamatti, and Ezra Miller
- Emma Bovary (2021), a France Télévisions TV film starring Camille Métayer and Thierry Godard

David Lean's film Ryan's Daughter (1970) was a loose adaptation of the story, relocating it to Ireland during the time of the Easter Rebellion. The script had begun life as a straight adaptation of Madame Bovary, but Lean convinced writer Robert Bolt to re-work it into another setting.

=== Other adaptations ===
- Emmanuel Bondeville's opera Madame Bovary was produced in 1951.
- Posy Simmonds' 1999 graphic novel Gemma Bovery (and Anne Fontaine's film adaptation) reworked the story into a satirical tale of English expatriates in France.
- Abraham's Valley in 1993, directed by Manoel de Oliveira, is a close adaptation set in Portugal, in which the novel is mentioned and discussed several times.
- The novel was loosely adapted in the Christian video series VeggieTales under the name Madame Blueberry and established the titular character herself as part of the series’s main cast.
- Harold Noben's opera Bovary premiered 12 April 2025, at the Théâtre National in Brussels, Belgium.

== See also ==
- I Am Not Madame Bovary (originally titled I Am Not Pan Jinlian)
- The Perpetual Orgy
- Arsenic poisoning
- Delphine Delamare
