= Maître à penser =

French-language phrase

Maître à penser is a French-language phrase, denoting a teacher whom one chooses, in order to learn not just a set of facts or point of view, but a way of thinking. It translates literally as "master for thinking".

To take a maître à penser is therefore close to becoming a disciple. The phrase itself can be used to refer to a type of person — an inspirational genius, for example — who naturally would attract followers interested enough to absorb a whole intellectual approach.

A maître à penser is therefore possibly something like a mentor, or guru with a possibly beneficent approach. A negative effect of such a master might be to close down all other intellectual avenues in a student, imposing some schematic or monolithic approach. Such a master receives the French pejorative maître-penseur.
