= Jeanne Duval =

French-born actress and dancer

- Florine Prosper
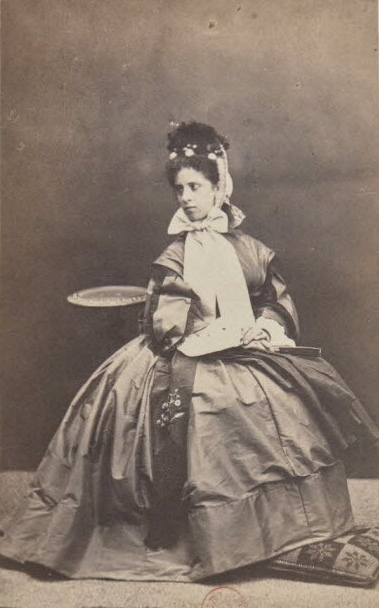
- Duval photographed by Félix Nadar (c. 1862)
- Born: November 18, 1818; Port-au-Prince, Haiti
- Died: December 20, 1868 (aged 50); Saint-Denis, France
- Occupation: Actress
- Known for: Charles Baudelaire's key muse
- Partner: Charles Baudelaire

Florine Prosper known as Jeanne Duval (French pronunciation: [ʒan dyval]; 18 November 1818 – 20 December 1868) was a Franco-Haitian actress. She was a key muse and longtime partner of poet and art critic Charles Baudelaire, with whom she had an on-again-off-again and tumultuous relationship spanning two decades.

== An enigma ==
Until recently, very little was known about Duval, as evidenced by the 2005 biography of Claude Pichois and Jean Ziegler on Baudelaire: "We do not know the family origins of Jeanne and up to her surname—if she had one".

Hypotheses about its geographical origins abounded: Jacmel in Haiti, Reunion Island, Mauritius, Mascarene Islands, India, South Africa, Madagascar, and Saint-Barts. For some scholars, Jeanne Duval's grandmother hailed from Haiti and her name was Marie Duval. Various accounts detail Marie Duval's journey, indicating that she may have been born in Guinea, sold into the slave trade, transported to Haiti, and subsequently sent to a brothel in Nantes, where she gave birth to Marie, Duval's mother, around 1789.

Contemporary observers completed the story and described Jeanne-Marie-Marthe Domingue (or Lemaire/Lemer), Jeanne Duval's mother, as "an old, respectable looking negress, with thick, greasy hair which tried in vain to twirl over her cheeks and ears". Sources have suggested that she might have been involved in prostitution. They assume that Jeanne Duval was probably of mixed African and French heritage, as her father and grandfather were likely Frenchmen, though she probably had minimal or no interaction with them.

Several surnames, such as Prosper, Lemer, and Lemaire, are associated with Jeanne Duval. Baudelaire, in his letters, often calls her "Mademoiselle Lemer" (in 1845, for example, in a letter to his family notary Ancelle), but also Jeanne Duval (1847 and 1859) and finally, "Jeanne Prosper" in 1864. Contemporary officials allegedly wrote the name Lerner or Lemaire on her mother's death certificate. Claude Pichois assumed that her actual name was Berthe, which she adopted as her stage name.

Her exact birthdate is debated. Most scholars agree it was around 1820. The only known document that indicated her age was the register of entries to a nursing home where Jeanne was hospitalized in 1859; it disappeared in a fire, but reportedly indicated that she was native to the island of Saint-Domingue and 32 years old, and so born in 1827.

Similarly, her physical appearance has been variously analyzed. The authors have frequently described Jeanne Duval as mixed-race and identified as métisse, mulatto, creole or negress, quadroon.

== Early life ==
Jeanne Duval was born in Port-au-Prince, Haiti on 18 November 1818 under the name of "Florine Prosper", as evidenced by her birth certificate. About the same document, her father was Jean Prosper, a innkeeper, and her mother was Jeanne Lemère, wife of Jean.

On 21 July 1821, Florine Prosper arrived in France from Haiti, on the three-master ship "L'Amédée" at the port of Le Havre, as indicated by the departmental register. On the register, her mother is listed as a widow Lemaire, born in Angers (France) and 38 years old; she is accompanied by her daughters, Florine but also by an eldest daughter Gabrielle born in Paris, about 10 years old [ca. 1811]. This indicates that before her stay in Haiti, the mother, born in France, was married to a Mr. Lemaire, who lived in Paris at the birth of Gabrielle.

In light of this evidence, Madame Choupin deduces the following hypothesis: Jeanne’s mother, who says she was born in Angers in 1780, married in France to a Lemaire (Lemer) and had a daughter, Gabrielle, born in Paris in 1810 or 1811. Then, she leaves for Haiti for an unknown reason: is she leaving with her husband or is she already a widow? There, she marries Jean Prosper (Prospère), innkeeper, who is undoubtedly a mulatto and who is the father of Jeanne. Jeanne Duval is therefore indeed a quadroon, which assumes three white grandparents. Let us note in passing that the frequent name of "Black Venus" is somewhat exaggerated for one whose skin was not very colored. Jean Prosper dies in Haiti and Jeanne’s mother is forced to return to France on the three-master "L'Amédée".

== Theatre career ==
Duval performed as an actress in the Latin Quarter under the name "Mlle Berthe".

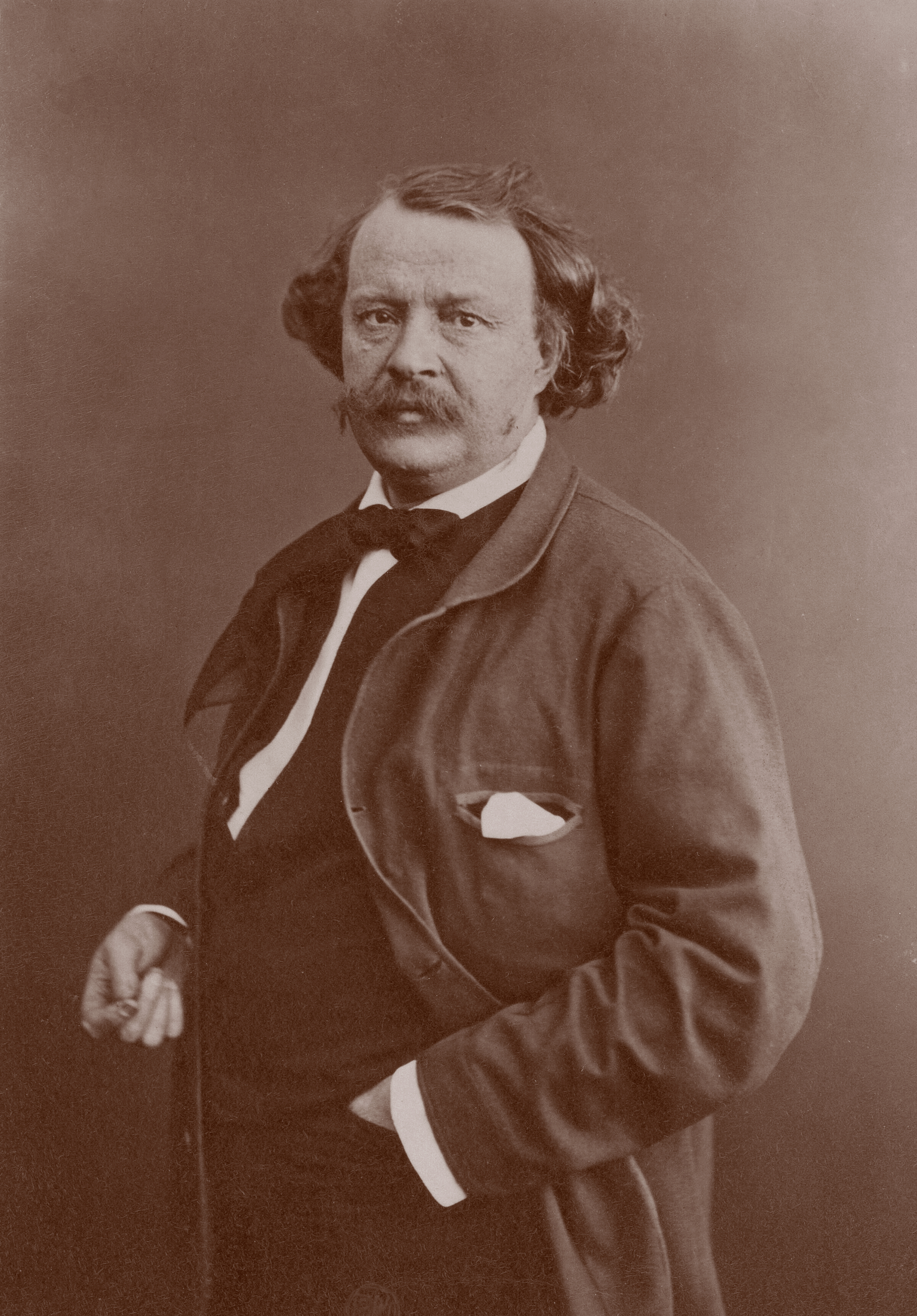
Félix Nadar self-portrait c. 1860

In 1838, she performed at the Théâtre de la Porte Saint-Antoine as La Comtesse in Rose et Colas. On December 2, 1838, Duval appeared in Le Système de mon oncle. During this time, Duval first encountered the photographer Gaspard-Félix Tournachon (pseudonym Nadar) leading to a short-lived affair that lasted from 1838 to 1839.

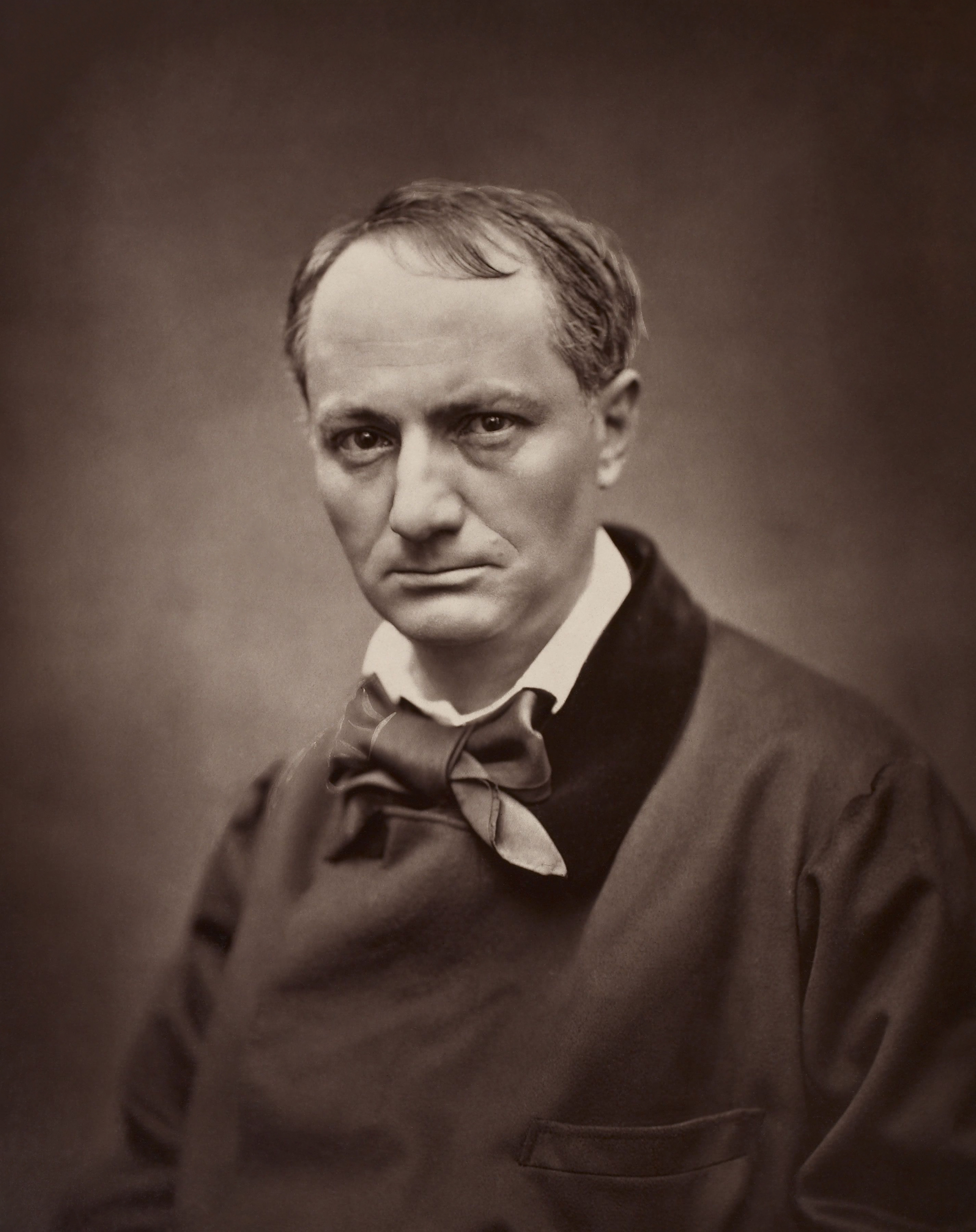
Portrait of Charles Baudelaire by Étienne Carjat. c. 1862

In 1840, Duval once again performed in Le Système de mon oncle. In 1842, Charles Baudelaire first saw Duval in a performance at the Théâtre du Panthéon. Baudelaire, captivated by Duval's charm, sent her flowers and requested a visit at her pleasure.

In 1844, Duval performed at the Théâtre de Belleville and demanded her unpaid wages from the director at the Théâtre du Panthéon. In 1845 and January 1846, Duval performed at the Théâtre Beaumarchais.

== Appearance ==
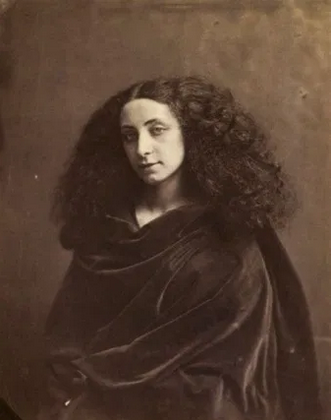
Jeunne modèle (Unknown Woman), c. 1860, photograph by Félix Nadar. Believed to be Jeanne Duval.

Descriptions of Duval's appearance are often contradictory and steeped in racial stereotypes and biases. Male writers characterized her as lacking in intelligence while simultaneously admiring her as a "genuine tropical beauty". For example, Théodore de Banville believed she possessed "something of both the divine and the bestial."

She was often described as tall, distinctly exceeding the average height, as noted by Nadar. The recently discovered archives mention that it measured 1.70 m (5’ 7”) in 1865 when the average height of women seemed to be 1.60 m (5’ 3”).

Furthermore, acquaintances mentioned that Duval's hair was "violently crimped" or "extremely tightly curled," likening it to a "possessed proliferation of the curling swathes of her mane the colour of black ink." Nadar called Duval's eyes "big as soup plates" and "even blacker" beneath her hair. Baudelaire would have described her in her later years as possessing "beautiful, soft, and nostalgic eyes that seem to long for the absent coconut palm." Duval had a straight nose and red lips described as "thick, fleshy, and lewd." Nadar accounts her nose as "small, delicate, possessing wings and nostrils shaped with exquisite finesse."

Commentators remarked that she had a relatively flat chest, a tiny waist, and "copiously curving thighs." Baudelaire, however, portrayed her with a generous bust, a slender waist, and gracefully curving hips.

Théodore de Banville observed that she moved with a "queenly gait, full of fierce grace." Prarond, however, characterized her as possessing an "awkward" disposition. Acquaintances described her voice as having a "sweetly hoarse inflection — bestially caressing."

== Relationship with Baudelaire ==
=== Early years ===
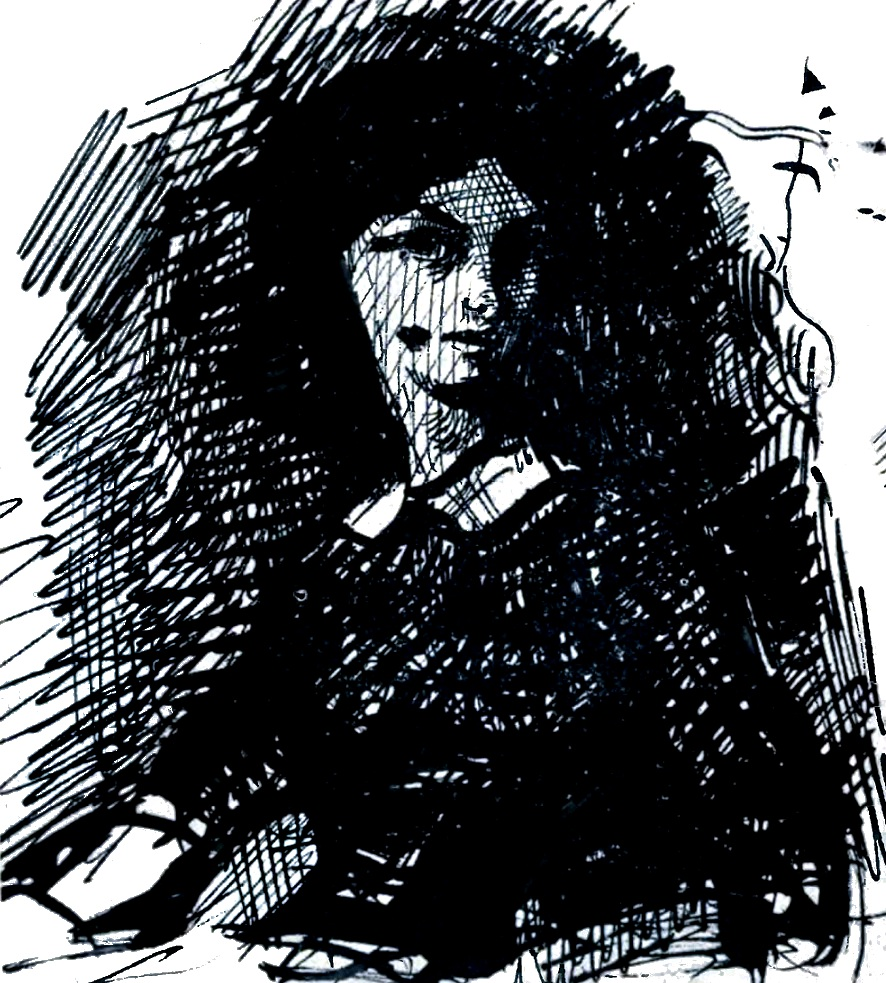
Portrait of Jeanne Duval, by Charles Baudelaire

In April 1842, Baudelaire was 21 years old and met Jeanne Duval when she was 23.

In 1843, Duval lived with her mother at 6 rue de la Femme-sans-tête, a more refined location than Baudelaire's residence at the Hôtel Pimodan. During the early 1840s, Duval and Baudelaire started to appear together in Baudelaire's bohemian circles, which included visits to artist's studios like that of Honoré Daumier.

Two years after their initial meeting, Duval and Baudelaire decided to move in together. They cohabited for several years, during which Baudelaire provided financial support to her, although his family lawyer, Ancelle, managed his finances. Their apartments "were furnished in oriental style, with Eastern rugs and hangings as a suitable setting for her dusky beauty".

Baudelaire sought to cultivate Jeanne Duval to make her a more intellectually stimulating companion. Significant abuse and instability marked their relationship. Baudelaire struck Jeanne Duval, fracturing her skull with a vase, sold her jewellery and furniture, and drove her into debt. Although the evidence is lacking, some claim that during this time, Jeanne Duval took out loans in his name for alcohol and drugs. Without confidences that one or the other would have made, some imagine, in their relationship, Jeanne Duval frequently maintained a sense of power over Baudelaire, even amidst the abuse.

In June 1845, Baudelaire made an attempt on his life in a café while seated next to Duval. Yet, Baudelaire bequeathed his inheritance to Jeanne Duval in his will, referring to her as his "joy and repose".

=== Years of instability and entanglements (1846–1854) ===
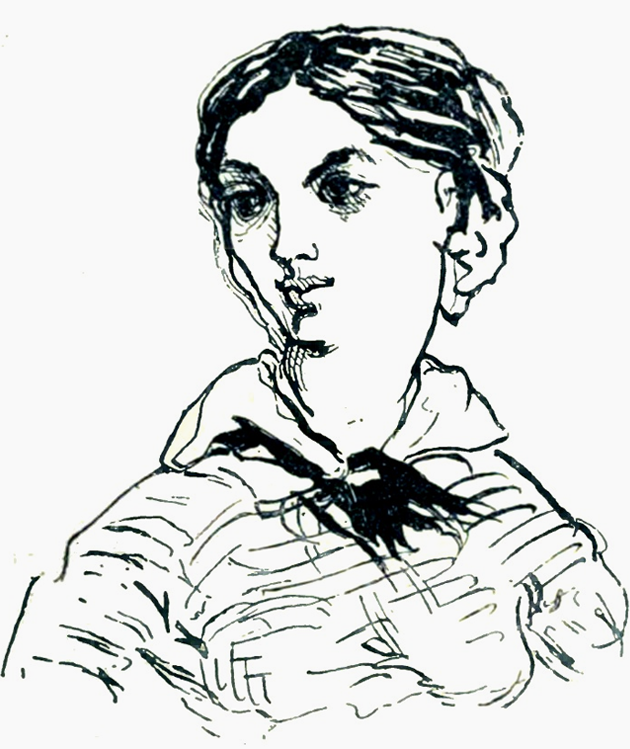
Jeanne Duval drawn by Charles Baudelaire, 1 January 1847

During the late 1840s and early 1850s, the relationship between Duval and Baudelaire was marked by turmoil and continual changes. Between August 1846 and July 1847, Duval resided with Baudelaire in Neuilly. In October 1847, they journeyed together to Châteauroux. In 1848, Baudelaire asserted that his love for Duval was merely a matter of duty; however, in 1850, Duval accompanied Baudelaire to Dijon. Although they parted ways in 1852, Baudelaire remained financially supportive and visited her two to three times each month. Although they reconciled at some point between 1852 and 1853, Jeanne Duval had, according to Baudelaire, several other lovers, including her hairdresser. In November 1853, Duval's mother died, and Baudelaire covered the expenses for the funeral.

In December 1854, Duval and Baudelaire officially parted ways.

The Artist's Studio (1855) by Gustave Courbet. Oil on Canvas, 361 cm x 598 cm.

==== Gustave Courbet's The Artist's Studio (1855) ====
In 1855, Gustave Courbet painted The Painter's Studio. The artwork illustrates three distinct groups: ordinary French citizens on the left, the Parisian artistic elite on the right, and the artist in the middle, serving as a mediator between the two factions. Courbet depicted Baudelaire as the final figure on the right, originally with Duval standing beside him, but Baudelaire later requested Duval be removed from the painting. Yet, Maria C. Scott writes, "A shadowy image of her emerges from the corner of the canvas ... just above Baudelaire's head, where the artist has scratched her out, for unknown reasons, but apparently at the poet's request".

=== Later years (1855–1861) ===
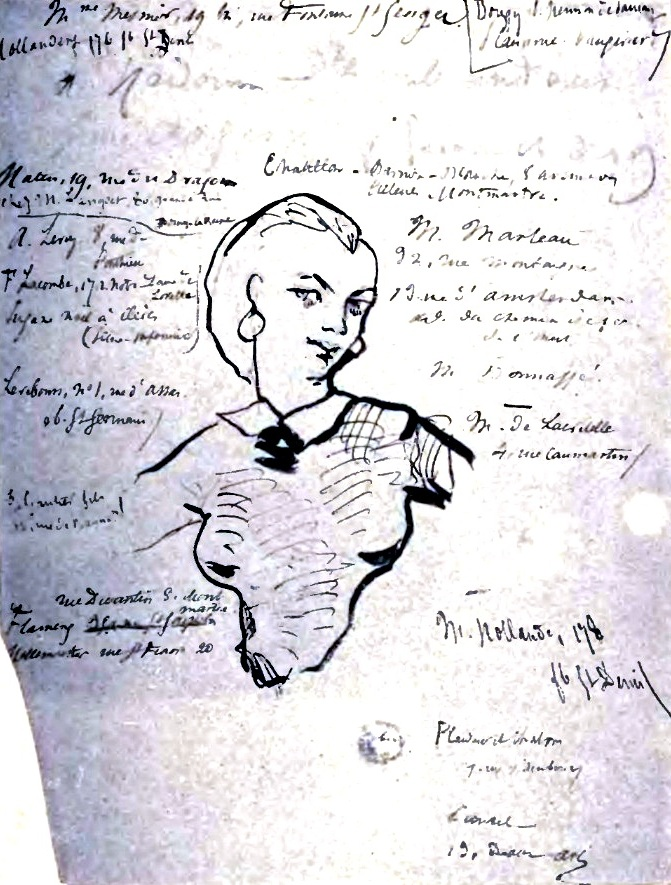
Charles Baudelaire drawing of Jeanne Duval, c. 1858–60

By 1854, Jeanne Duval's own health had started to decline. In January 1855, Duval and Baudelaire reunited again, residing at 18 rue d'Angoulême-du-Temple. The couple separated once more in September 1856. In February 1859, Jeanne Duval relocated to 22 rue Beautreilly, where Baudelaire resided with her for six weeks.

On April 5, 1859, Duval experienced a stroke, likely due to syphilis, which left her partially paralyzed. She was hospitalised at the Maison de Santé Dubois on rue du Faubourg St-Denis. Baudelaire conveyed his embarrassment regarding Duval's condition to his mother, noting, “I forbade her to come and visit me here; it was my odious pride that made me do it.—I don't want people to see a woman of mine looking poor, sick, and scruffy, when they knew her as a beautiful, healthy, and elegant woman.” Baudelaire voiced his worries, saying he wished for her always to have money. In his correspondence with his mother, Baudelaire frequently embellished the stories to arouse sympathy and obtain financial aid because of Jeanne Duval’s illness.

From 1860 to 1861, Jeanne Duval resided at 4 rue Louis-Philippe in Neuilly. In December 1860, Baudelaire made one last effort to reside with her, but upon his arrival, he discovered her cohabiting with another man (who insisted he was her brother). In January 1861, Baudelaire expressed frustration at financially supporting Duval with a man who contributed no income and did nothing for the household. In February 1861, Duval and Baudelaire parted ways for good; nevertheless, he continued to provide her with financial support intermittently for the remainder of his life.

=== Relationship dynamics ===
Jeann Duval and Baudelaire had a complex and tumultuous relationship. Although Baudelaire had a lengthy relationship with Jeanne, he never deemed marriage a possibility, perhaps because of her background and social standing.

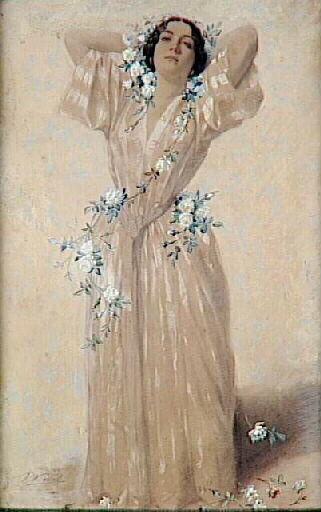
Apollonie Sabatier drawn by Vincent Vidal

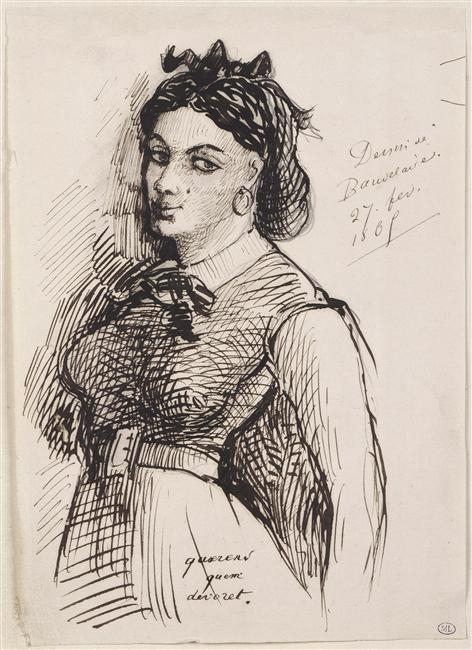
Charles Baudelaire (1821–67), drawing of Jeanne Duval, February 2, 1865

Baudelaire immortalized Jeanne Duval in his poetry, frequently referring to her as La Vénus Noire (The Black Venus). Although she was one of Baudelaire's many lovers, she was his "mistress of mistresses." Théodore de Banville, a close friend of Baudelaire, believed that Duval was the sole woman Baudelaire genuinely loved. Baudelaire exchanged drawings and discussed Jeanne Duval with his friend Apollonie Sabatier, whom he referred to as his la Vénus Blanche and angelic muse, even illustrating Duval's profile in her album. Sabatier inscribed this in her edition of Les Fleurs du mal, adding "his ideal" beneath it.

== Later life ==
Even after their separation, Baudelaire requested his mother look after Jeanne, who now resided outside Paris. In May 1861, Duval was admitted to a hospice because her health had deteriorated. By 1864 Duval had lost her sight and lived under the name Jeanne Prosper at 17 rue Sauffroy, in the Batignolles district.

Following Baudelaire's death in 1867, imaginations had completed the rare and fragile testimonies: “Jeanne Duval continued engaging with Bohemian circles despite her declining health." "In 1870, Nadar observed her hobbling along the streets of Paris on crutches." "Between 1870 and 1878, Duval received a visit from singer Emma Calvé in her Batignolles apartment." The precise date and details surrounding Duval's death remain unclear.

Still in her book of Revelations, Mrs. Catherine Choupin brings the evidence:

From 14 July 1865 to 20 July 1865 and then from 23 April 1868 to 20 December 1868, Jeanne Duval found refuge at 92 rue de Paris in Saint-Denis. It is the address of a "begging depot", belonging to the Police Prefecture, where beggars and indigents from the department of the Seine are welcomed. The identification sheet prepared at her entrance proves that it is indeed Jeanne Duval.

Jeanne Duval, under the name Florine Jeanne Gabrielle Adeline Prosper, died on 20 December 1868, 16 months after Charles Baudelaire.

== Legacy ==
Jeanne Duval's reputation has long been a negative one, influenced by the racist and misogynistic stereotypes that were common in 19th-century French society. Baudelaire's mother strongly disliked Duval, and his friends found it difficult to accept her, struggling to fit her into a respectable image of his life.

=== Les Fleurs du mal ===
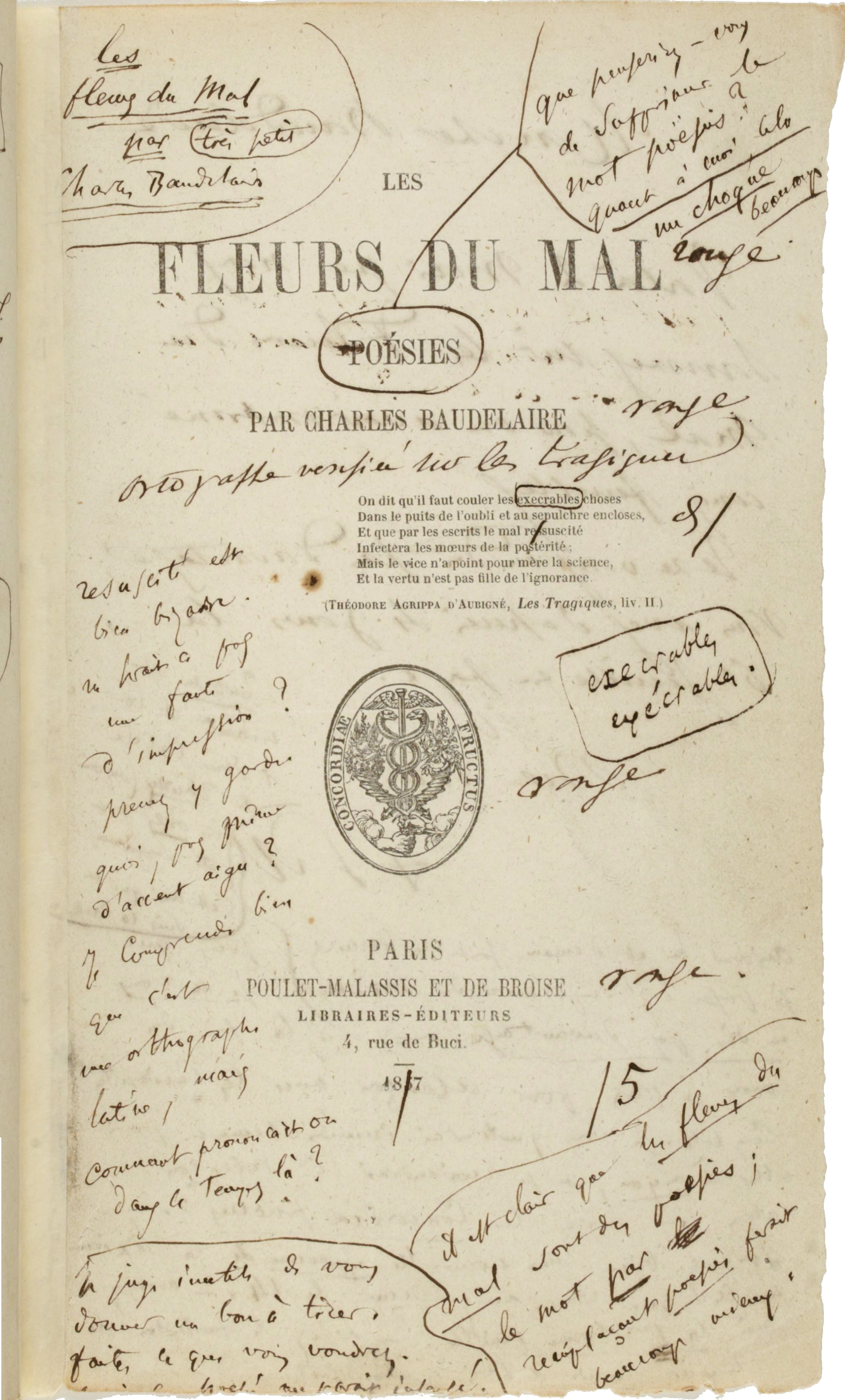
The first edition of Les Fleurs du mal with Charles Baudelaire's notes

Baudelaire celebrates Jeanne Duval in Les Fleurs du mal, particularly in poems 22–39, recognising her as La Vénus noire (The Black Venus). Throughout his poetry, Baudelaire portrays Jeanne Duval as powerful, sensual, cruel and destructive. He loves her deeply yet perceives her as sinister, referring to her as "O mon cher Belzébuth, je adore!"

Similarly, Baudelaire portrayed her as vital to his brilliance and his rescue from isolation. Baudelaire views their relationship as a united front against the world. Jeanne Duval represents a captivating and unfamiliar realm to him and embodies otherness and difference, serving not merely as a woman or lover but distinctly as Black.

Poems of Baudelaire's that are dedicated to Jeanne Duval or pay her homage include "Le balcon" (The Balcony), "Parfum exotique" (Exotic Perfume), "La chevelure" (The Hair), "Sed non satiata" (Yet she is not satisfied), "Le serpent qui danse" (The Dancing Serpent), and "Une charogne" (A Carcass) but also “Avec ses vêtements ondoyants” (With her Pearly, Undulating Dresses), “Les Bijoux” (jewellery), « Le Sonnet 39 » (the sonnet 39) and more !

In addition, two texts are dedicated to JGF, a dedication that had remained mysterious until then, unintelligible as Baudelaire had certainly desired: the poem Héautontimorouménos in Les Fleurs du mal (published in 1857) and Les Paradis artificiels (text published in 1860). We now know that they were dedicated to Jeanne Gabrielle Florine.

=== Jeanne Duval, Baudelaire's Mistress, Reclining by Édouard Manet (1862) ===
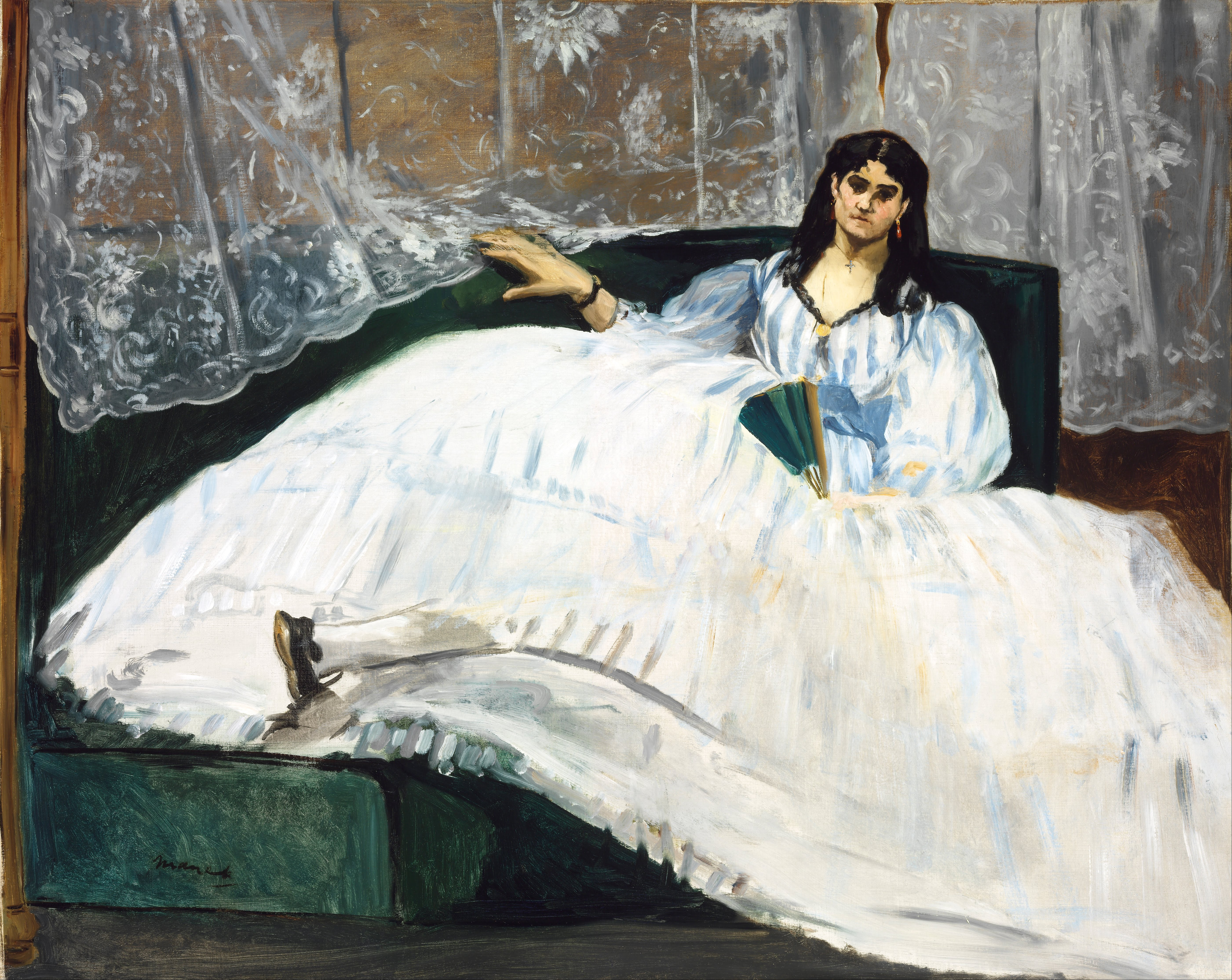
Baudelaire's Mistress, Reclining (1862) by Édouard Manet. Oil on canvas, 90 x 113 cm.

Many art historians believe Jeanne Duval is the subject of Édouard Manet's Baudelaire's Mistress, Reclining (1862), as evidenced by the artist's studio register entries completed by his wife, Suzanne Manet. It was exhibited once in Manet's lifetime at the Galerie Martinet in 1865. In the portrait, Duval reclines gracefully on a green sofa, holding a fan gently in her left hand while her fingers lightly touch the edge of a lace curtain. Her voluminous skirt, stretching across the canvas, is suddenly cropped at the lower right corner, capturing the viewer's attention with its exaggerated size.

Manet portrays Duval in a striking and direct manner. By 1862, Duval's health deteriorated significantly, probably as a result of a stroke linked to syphilis, a condition that physically disabled her. Manet seems to emphasize this state of frailty through intentional distortions, notably the striking enlargement of her hand, which nearly matches the size of her head, giving the figure an unsettling, almost grotesque quality.

The painting reflects the themes and atmosphere in Baudelaire's Les Fleurs du mal, which celebrates Jeanne Duval as a muse intertwined with suffering and sensuality. The grand scale of her skirt might bring to mind the royal imagery found in Velázquez's Infanta Margherita, a visual link that directly relates to Baudelaire's nickname for her: "Vieille Infante."

=== Popular culture ===
Duval serves as a main character in Caribbean author Nalo Hopkinson's The Salt Roads, a work of historical fiction, and in the title story of the collection Black Venus by Angela Carter. Kathy Acker's short story "New York City in 1979" is dedicated to "Jeanne's insulted beauty," which is a reference to Jeanne Duval.

The noted American conceptual artist Lorraine O'Grady developed a 16-diptych photo-installation featuring paired images of Baudelaire and Duval titled Flowers of Evil and Good. Preliminary studies for this installation have been exhibited in the Institute of Contemporary Art, Boston, the Thomas Erben Gallery, New York, and Galerie Fotohof in Salzburg, Austria. O'Grady has written extensively about the relationship of Baudelaire and Duval in Mousse Magazine and Pétunia: magazine féministe d'art contemporain et de loisirs.

Scottish artist Maud Sulter created several artworks inspired by Duval, using images such as her photograph by Nadar, and self-portraits of the artist. Many of these were displayed in a solo show at the Scottish National Portrait Gallery titled Jeanne Duval: A Melodrama.

Mademoiselle Baudelaire, by Belgian comic artist Bernard Hislaire, is a 2021 biographical graphic novel about the affairs between Jeanne Duval and Charles Baudelaire.

Le Point de vue de Jeanne (Jeanne's Point of View) is a 2024 biographical novel of Duval's life written by Catherine Choupin.
