= Edmond Richard =

Edmond Richard may refer to:

- Edmond Richard (cinematographer) (1927–2018), cinematographer
- Edmond Richard (writer), lover and biographer of Apollonie Sabatier
