= Woman Bitten by a Serpent =

1847 marble sculpture by Auguste Clésinger

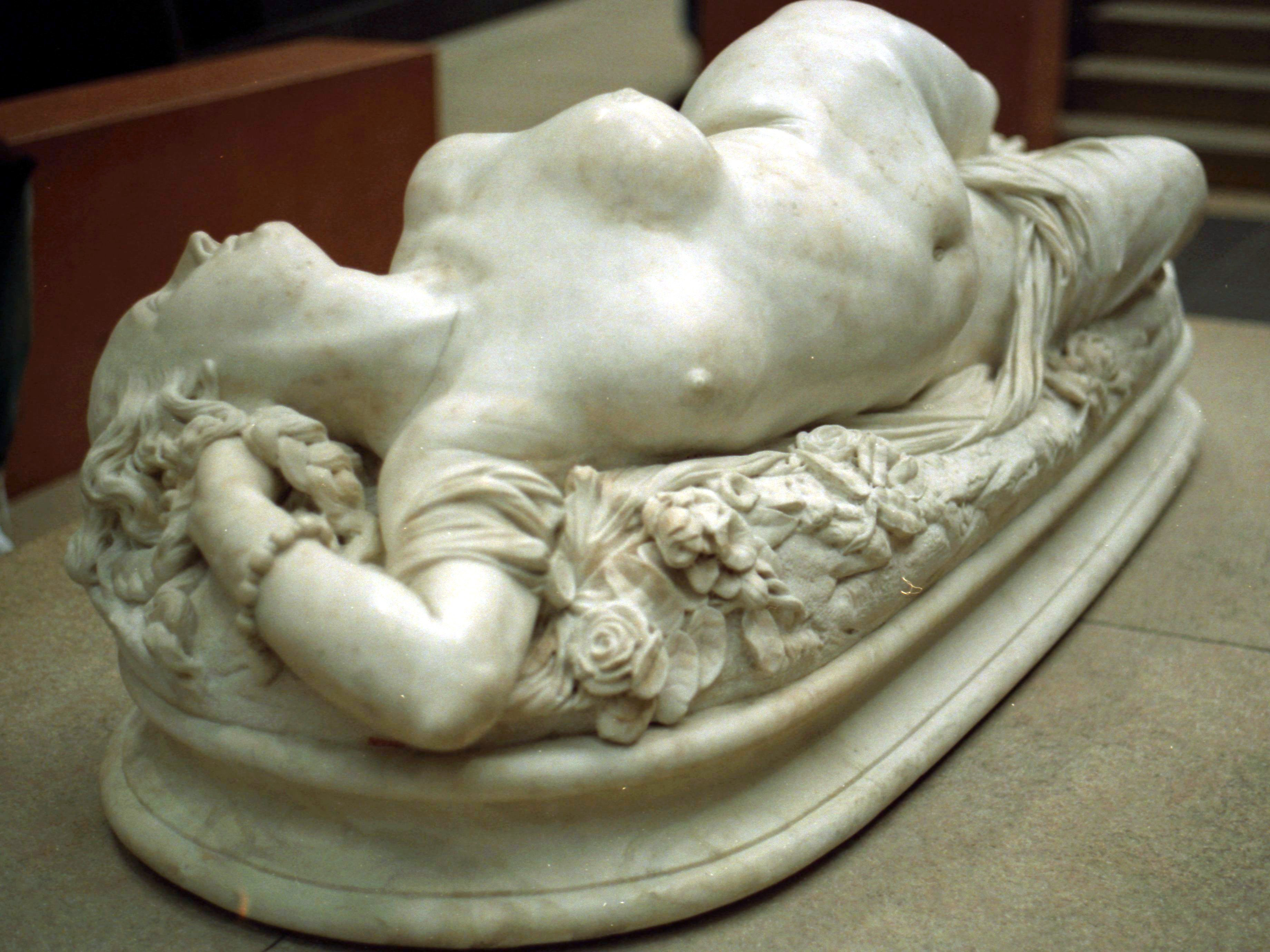
- Artist: Auguste Clésinger
- Year: 1847
- Dimensions: 56.5 cm × 180 cm (22.2 in × 71 in)
- Location: Musée d'Orsay, Paris

Woman Bitten by a Serpent (French: Femme piquée par un serpent) is an 1847 marble sculpture by Auguste Clésinger (1814–1883), now in the Musée d'Orsay in Paris. It depicts a violently contorted nude among a bed of flowers, with a small snake latched onto her left arm.

It was commissioned by the industrialist Alfred Mosselman and first exhibited in the Paris Salon of 1847, where it and Thomas Couture's The Romans in their Decadence were the most commented-upon works. Clésinger had modelled his work on a life-cast of Mosselman's mistress, the demi-mondaine Apollonie Sabatier (1822–1890), later Charles Baudelaire's muse. The direct use of a life cast as the basis for a sculpture was highly controversial in the 19th century, particularly in its realism, such as the reproduction of the model's cellulite. Clésinger's friend Théophile Gautier orchestrated a response to the art critics' scandalised reviews, ensuring the sculpture's great success.

At the end of 1847, Clésinger also produced a Reclining Bacchante (Bacchante couchée), slightly larger than Woman so as to confute criticisms of his technical skills with marble. This was exhibited in room 4 of the Petit Palais in the 1848 Salon – Théophile Gautier wrote that it showed "pure orgiastic delirium, the disheveled Maenad tumbled at the feet of Bacchus, father of liberty and joy ... A powerful spasm of happiness contracts and raises the young woman's opulent bosom and in fact makes the sparkling breasts spring up." He concluded by calling the work "one of the most beautiful pieces of modern sculpture".

The provisionary title of the sculpture, 'femme', was applauded by Théophile Gautier due to its boldness in rejecting the depiction of a mythologised woman.

Clésinger's Woman is the basis of a 2008 painting by Kehinde Wiley also titled Woman bitten by a serpent, which replaces the eponymous nude with a young African-American man in modern clothing.

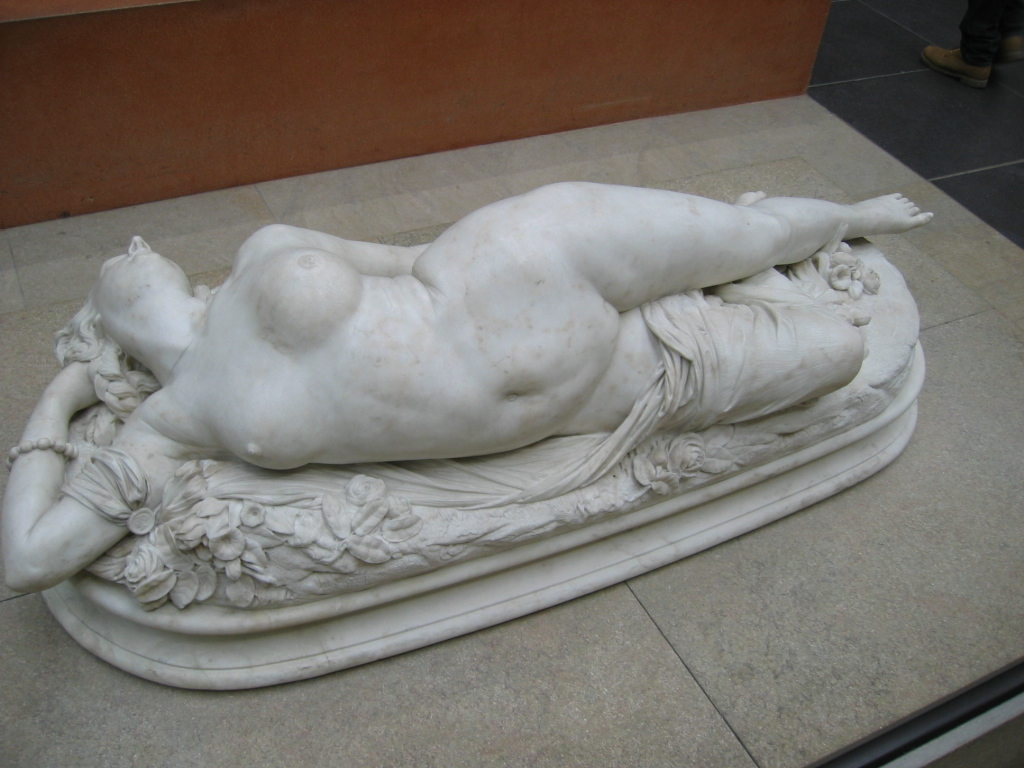
Front

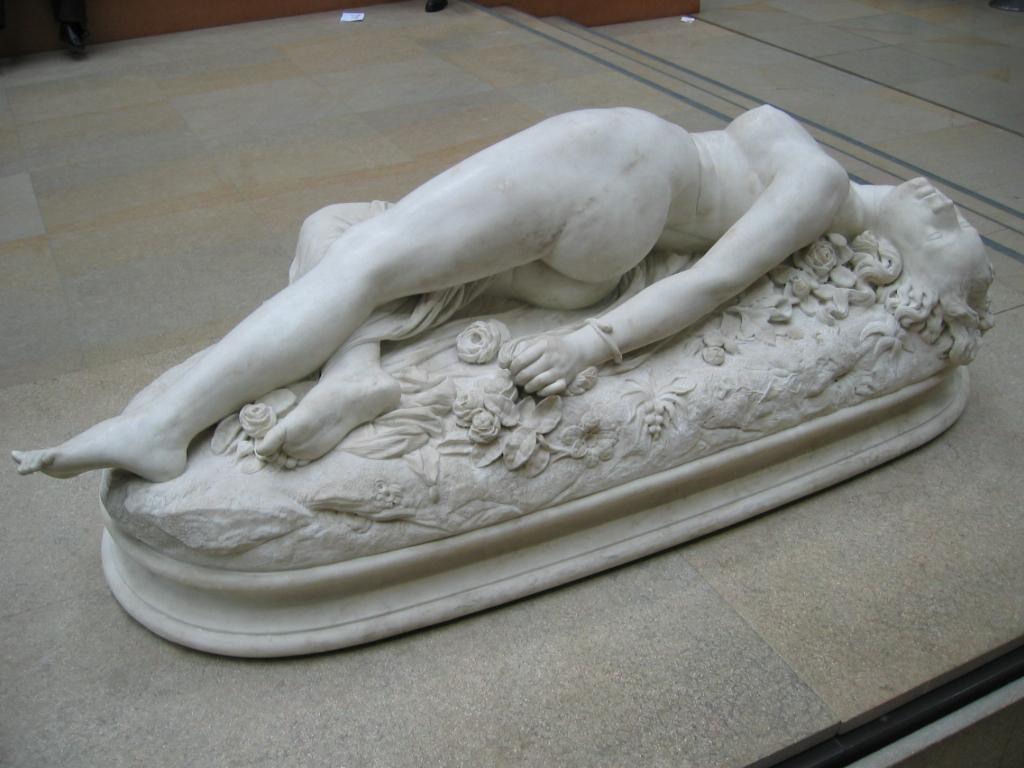
Rear

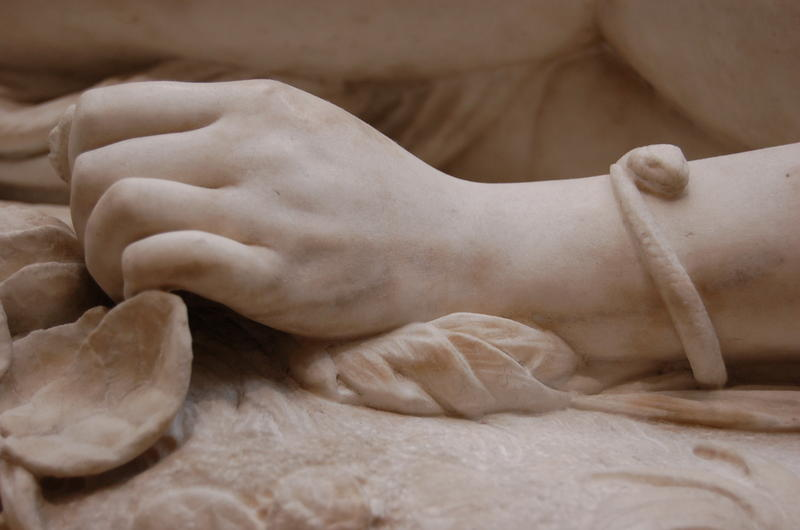
Detail, rear

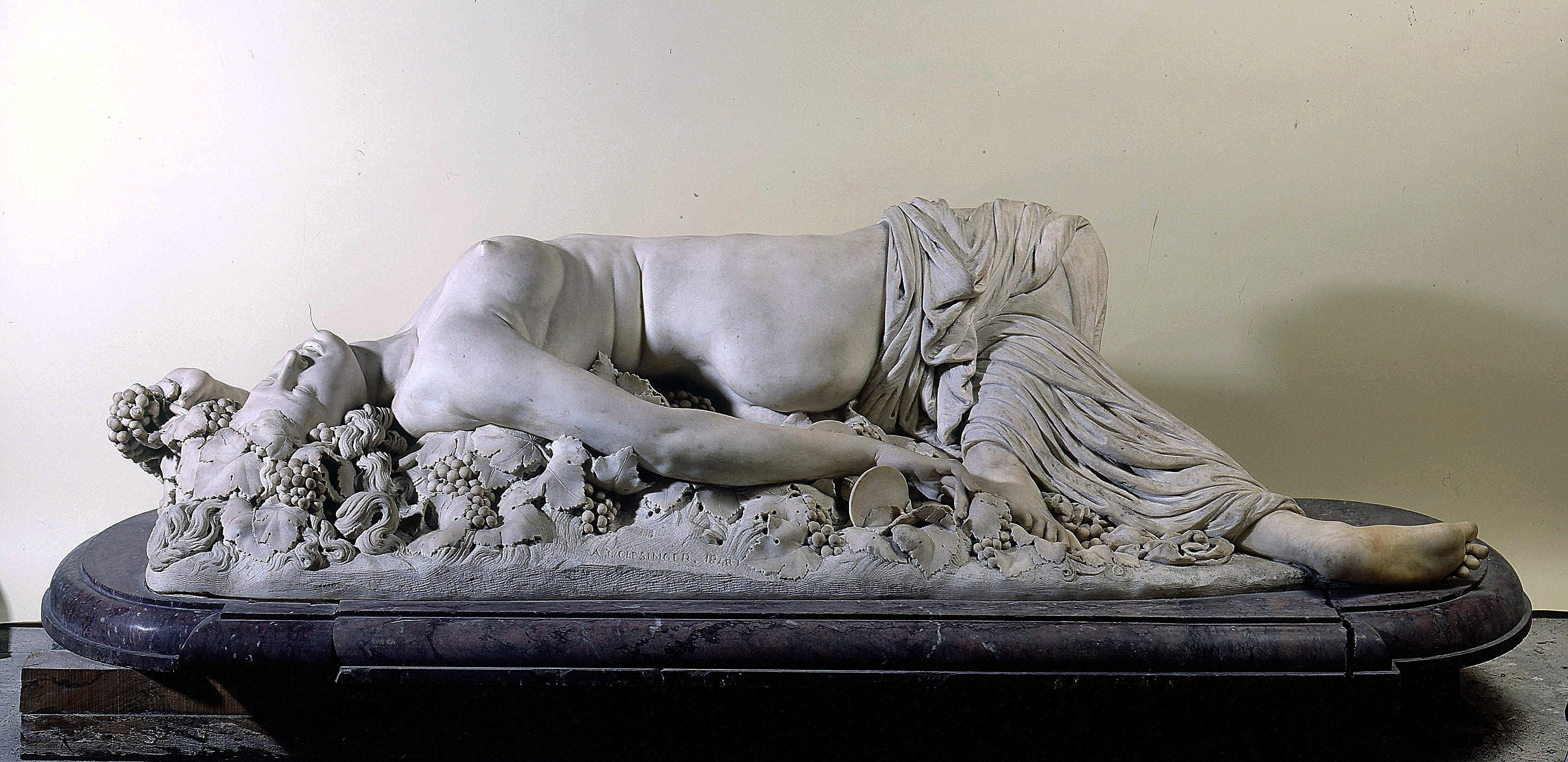
Reclining Bacchante, 1848
