= Berthe de Courrière =

French artists' model (1852–1916)

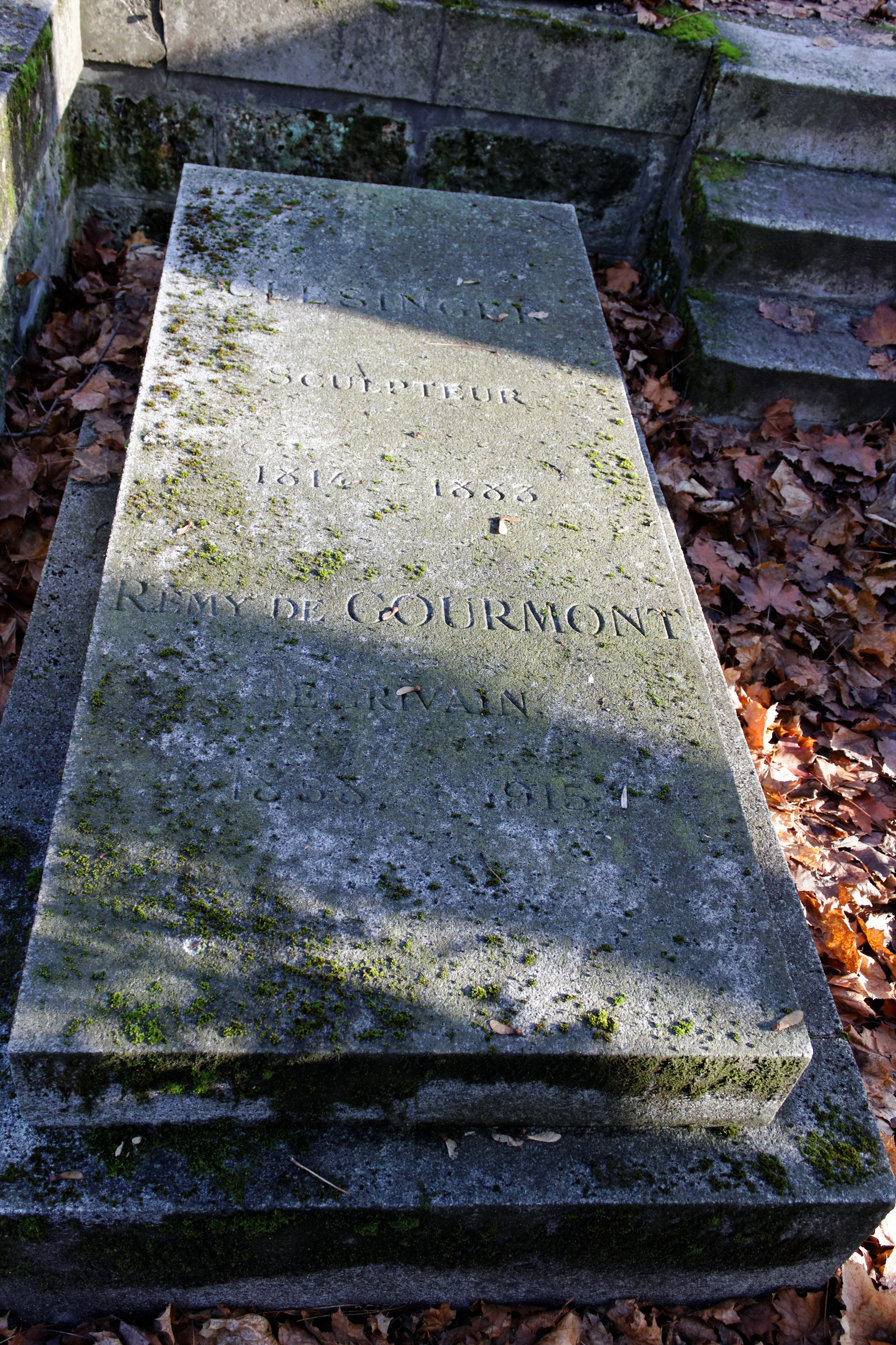
- Tomb of Auguste Clésinger, Remy de Gourmont and Berthe de Courrière
- Born: Caroline Louise Victoire Courrière; June , 1852; Lille, France
- Died: June 14, 1916 (aged 63–64); Paris, France
- Occupations: artists' model, demimondaine

Berthe de Courrière (June 1852, Lille – 14 June 1916, Paris) was a French artists' model and demimondaine. She was the mistress, model, and heir of the sculptor and painter Auguste Clésinger.

== Life ==
Born Caroline Louise Victoire Courrière in June 1852 in Lille, de Courrière set out for Paris at age 20 and first became the mistress of General Georges Boulanger and several ministers. The sculptor Auguste Clésinger, son-in-law of George Sand, remarked on Courrière's full form and gigantic proportions, bringing her the nicknames la grande dame ("the big woman") or Berthe aux grands pieds ("Bigfoot Bertha"). She was his model for the bust of Marianne for the Sénat as well as for the colossal statue of the Republic for the 1878 Exposition Universelle. On Clésinger's death, in 1883, Berthe was his sole heiress and found herself with a large fortune.

In 1886, she met Remy de Gourmont, then making his literary debut, and commissioned him to write a memorial of Clésinger. She became Gourmont's mistress and muse. Gourmont lived with her, at first on rue de Varenne then at 71 rue des Saints-Pères, until his death in 1915. de Courrière had him buried in the same vault as Clésinger. She died in 1916 and was laid to rest beside the two men in Clésinger's vault at the cimetière du Père-Lachaise. Gourmont's passionate letters to her during the year 1887 were published together in one volume as Lettres à Sixtine (1921).

== Occultism ==
de Courrière was interested in occultism and found herself involved in a Black Mass affair that nearly went awry and earned her a month 's stay in a psychiatric hospital. In the early morning of 8 September 1890 the Bruges police were informed that a naked woman was parading on the fortresses near the Smedenpoort. She showed signs of mental disorder and was taken to the Sint-Juliaan psychiatric institution in the Boeveriestraat where she was identified as Berthe de Courrière. On 6 October, Gourmont travelled from Paris and removed her from the institution. It turned out that de Courrière had spent the night of 7 to 8 September at Moerstraat 36, the house of Canon Louis Van Haecke, rector of the chapel of the Holy Blood and alleged exorcist. She was also in touch with ex-Father Joseph-Antoine Boullan, who was laicized as a heretic.

de Courrière had to be interned a second time in Brussels in 1906, and she wrote a violent booklet, Nero Prince of Science, against Jean-Martin Charcot, which is characteristic of the hatred that patients sometimes devote to their psychiatrist.

She had a morbid passion for ecclesiastics, whom she endeavored to seduce by all means. Rachilde claims to have seen her take out of her tapestry bag of consecrated hosts to throw them to stray dogs. The interior of her residence, according to Henry de Groux, "is the most heterogeneous thing I could ever have imagined in the taste of this half-pagan, half-catholic, or so-called world. These are only chasubles, altar cloths, objects of worship adapted to the most unexpected destinations, monstrances, corporals, dalmatics, candelabra with multicolored candles, mysteriously lit in corners of shadow, near a superb lectern on its wings works by Félicien Rops or the Marquis de Sade. The scent of benzoin, amber and rose essence alternately suffocate with those of incense."

As a practitioner of the cult of Satan, her vault in the cemetery of Pere Lachaise still attracts lovers of black masses.

== In popular culture ==
In 1889, Gourmont presented de Courrière to Joris-Karl Huysmans who based the character of Mme Hyacinthe Chantelouve in his novel Là-Bas (1891) on her.

Gourmont based his novels Sixtine, roman de la vie cérébrale (1890) and Le Fantôme (1893), both tales of religio-sadistic eroticism, on de Courrière.

== Bibliography ==
- Baldick, Robert (1975). La vie de J. K. Huysmans (in French). Denoël.
- Brasey, Stéphanie; Brasey, Édouard (2011). Traité de sorcellerie (in French). Place Des Editeurs. ISBN 9782842284770.
- Faxneld, Per (2017). Satanic Feminism: Lucifer as the Liberator of Woman in Nineteenth-century Culture. Oxford University Press. ISBN 9780190664473.
- Gillyboeuf, Thierry, ed. (2016). Berthe de Courrière (in French). CARGO-Cercle des amateurs de Remy de Gourmont. ISBN 9782956063704.
- Huysmans, Joris-Karl (1977). Lettres inédites à Arij Prins, 1885-1907 (in French). Librairie Droz. ISBN 9782600025188.
- Introvigne, Massimo (2016). Satanism: A Social History. BRILL. ISBN 9789004244962.
- Levi, Anthony (1992). Guide to French literature: 1789 to the present. St. James Press. ISBN 9781558620865.
