= Apollonie Sabatier =

French model

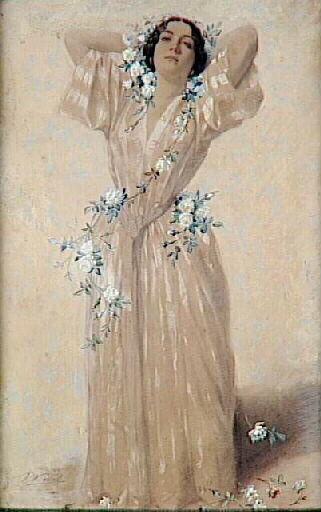
- Portrait of Apollonie Sabatier by Vincent Vidal, Musée National du château de Compiègne.
- Born: Aglaé Joséphine Savatier; 8 April 1822; Mézières, France
- Died: 3 January 1890 (aged 67); Neuilly-sur-Seine, France
- Other name: La Présidente
- Occupations: Singer, Courtesan, Salon hostess, artist's model

Apollonie Sabatier (born Aglaé Joséphine Savatier; 8 April 1822 – 3 January 1890) was a French singer, artist's model and courtesan, who became a salon hostess and bohemian muse to many of the French artists of 1850s Paris.

== Biography ==
Aglaé Joséphine Savatier was born in Mézières. Her mother was Marguerite Martin who worked as a laundress for Count Louis Harmand d'Abancourt, Aglaé's biological father. The count arranged after Aglaé's birth that army sergeant André Savatier, who was stationed near the village, become her stepfather. Martin and Savatier were married in Paris on 27 October 1825.

The family moved to Paris, where Aglaé started singing at the Opéra Garnier after school. She changed her name to Apollonie and became a painter's model and posed for the statue Femme piquée par un serpent (1847) by Auguste Clésinger which is currently on display at the Musée d'Orsay. This image caused a scandal at the Salon of 1847 and made sculptor and model famous. The piece was commissioned by Belgian tycoon Alfred Mosselman, who was Sabatier's lover. The brass snake was hastily added prior to exhibition.

== Salon ==
Sabatier hosted a salon in Paris on Rue Frochot, near the Place Pigalle, where she met nearly all of the French artists of her time, such as Gérard de Nerval, Nina de Villard, Arsène Houssaye, Edmond Richard, Gustave Flaubert, Louis Bouilhet, Maxime du Camp, Gustave Ricard, Judith Gautier, daughter of Théophile; Ernest Feydeau, father of Georges Feydeau, Hector Berlioz, Paul de Saint-Victor, Alfred de Musset, Henry Monnier, Victor Hugo, Ernest Meissonnier, Charles Augustin Sainte-Beuve, Charles Jalabert, Ernesta Grisi, Gustave Doré, the musician Ernest Reyer, James Pradier, Auguste Préault, Jules Barbey d'Aurevilly, Auguste Clésinger and Édouard Manet.

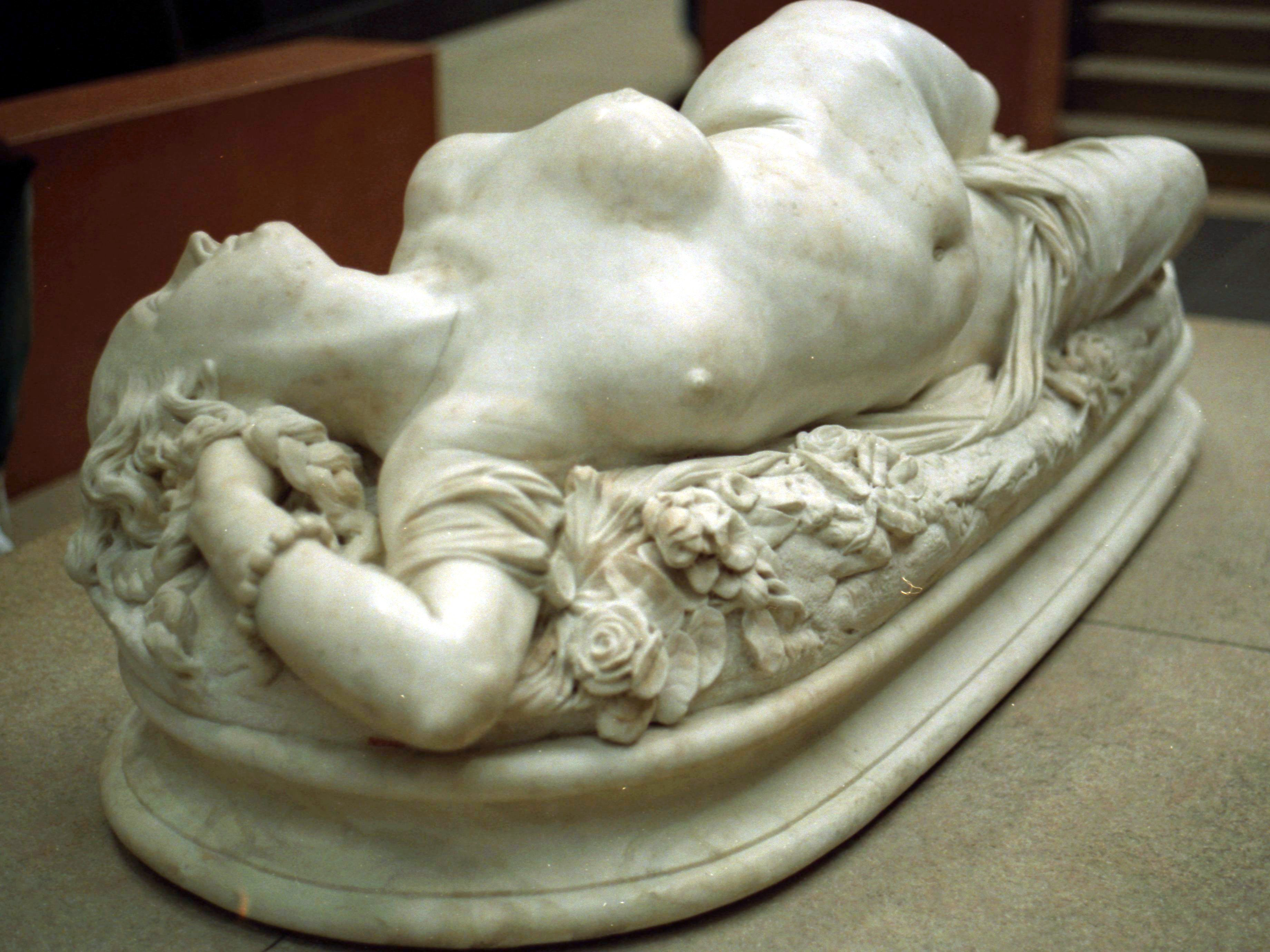
Apollonie Sabatier, sculpted by Auguste Clésinger as Woman Bitten by a Serpent in 1847, today in Musée d'Orsay

L'Atelier du peintre.

Gustave Flaubert, Théophile Gautier and some others have written articles about her and she was one of four women (Caroline, Jeanne Duval, herself and Marie Daubrun) who inspired Charles Baudelaire's famous work Les Fleurs du Mal. Sabatier and Baudelaire were lovers from 1857 to 1862. Edmond de Goncourt was the first to nickname Sabatier La Présidente. A term used by Gautier in his Lettre à la Présidente, which was published in print in 1890.

One of her contemporaries described Sabatier as: "quite tall and well-proportioned and had very narrow joints and beautiful hands. Her hair was soft as silk, chestnut, and seemed to flatter itself in full waves with a golden sparkle around her head. Her skin was smooth and flawless, her features were regular, she had a small mouth, ready to laugh, and something scanty and witty, but above all she distinguished herself by a haze of triumph that seemed to envelop her like a halo of happiness. She dressed with a lot of taste and fantasy. She did not follow fashion closely, but created her own style. Great artists who frequented her Sunday meetings gave her advice and drew models for her".

In Gustave Courbet's 1855 painting L'Atelier du peintre she is said to be shown together with her longtime lover, Alfred Mosselman. After his death she was the longtime mistress to art collector and donor to the Wallace fountains, Sir Richard Wallace, 1st Baronet.

She also entered works for the Paris Salon, and was among the artists rejected from the 1863 exhibition who chose to show their works in the Salon des Refusés (Miniatures, Nos. 503-505).

Sabatier died from influenza at Neuilly-sur-Seine on 3 January 1890.

== Gallery ==
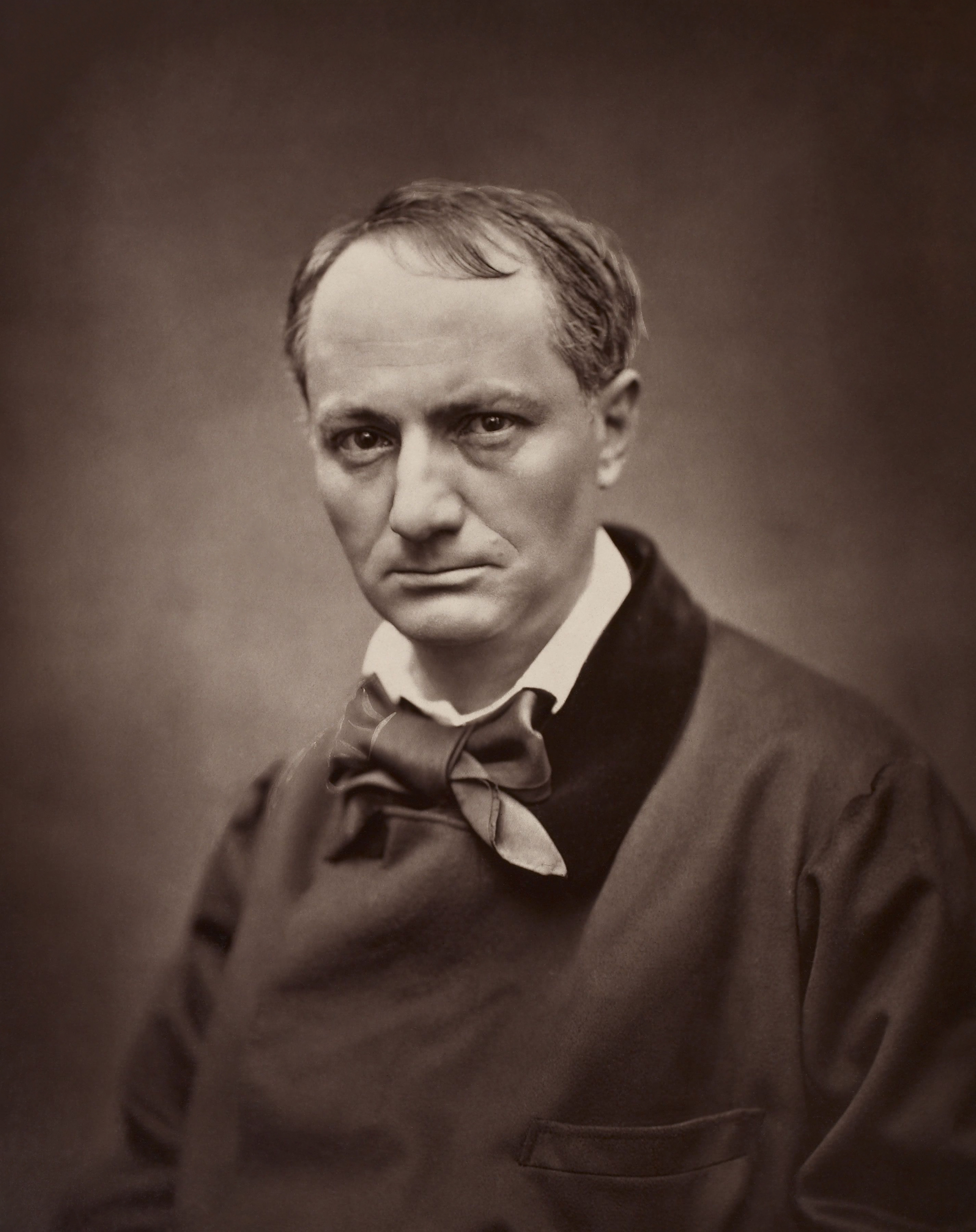
Charles Baudelaire

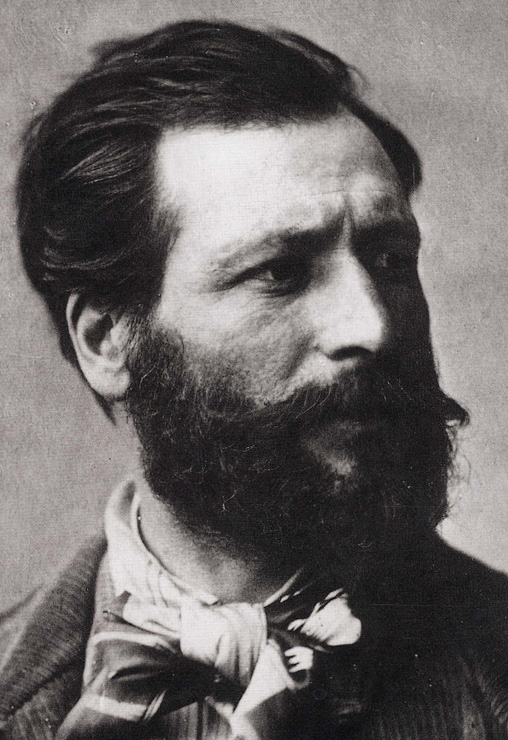
Auguste Clésinger

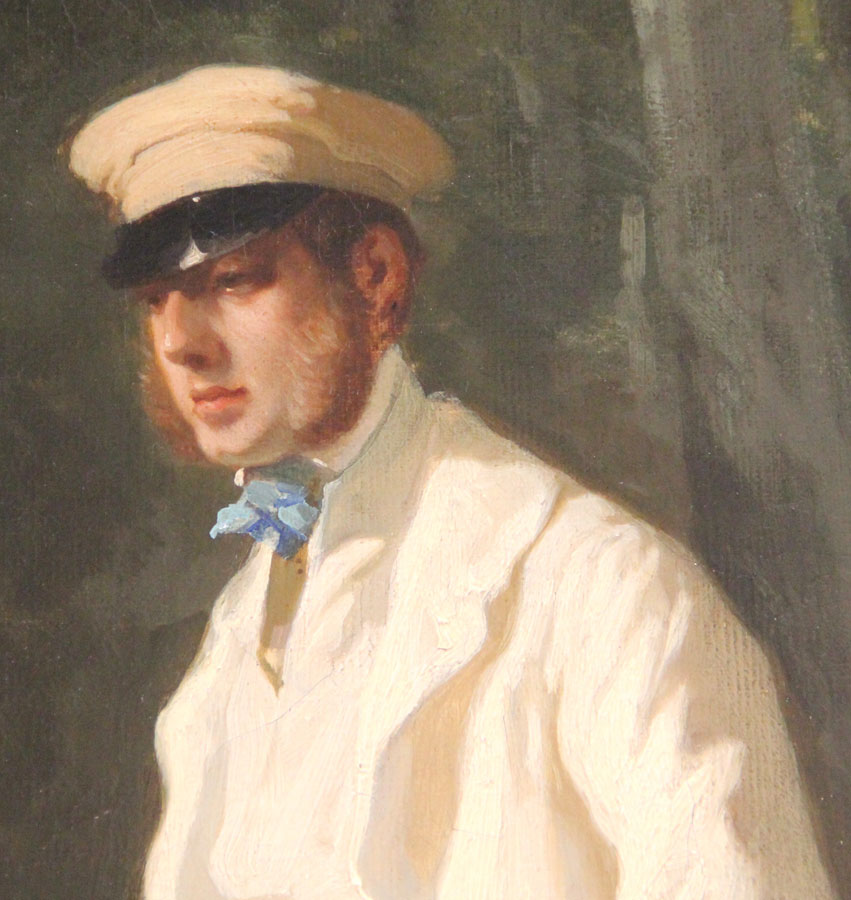
Alfred Mosselman

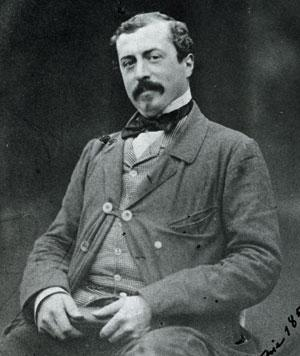
Sir Richard Wallace

== Bibliography ==
- Fitzgerald, Robert (1985). Enlarging the change: the Princeton seminars in literary criticism, 1949-1951. Northeastern University Press. ISBN 9780930350628.
- Gautier, Théophile (1890). Lettre à la présidente: voyage en Italie, 1850 (in French). Secret Museum of the King of Naples.
- Jarry, Paul (1929). Cénacles et vieux logis parisiens (in French). Tallandier.
- Mermaz, Louis (1979). Madame Sabatier: Apollonie au pays des libertins (in French). Edito-Service.
- Richardson, Joanna (1969). The Bohemians: la vie de Bohème in Paris, 1830-1914. Macmillan.
- de Senneville, Gérard (1998). La Présidente: une égérie au XIXe siècle. Stock. ISBN 9782234049871.
