= Auguste Clésinger =

French sculptor and painter (1814–1883)

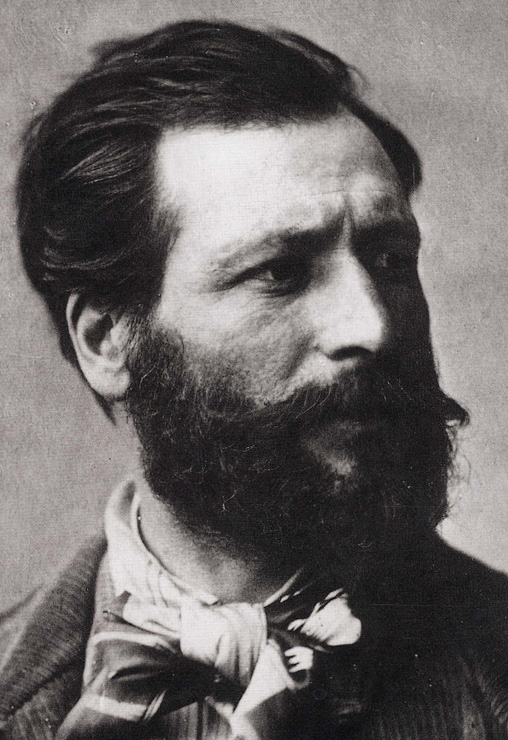
- Born: Jean-Baptiste Auguste Clésinger; 22 October 1814; Besançon, France
- Died: 5 January 1883 (aged 68); Paris, France
- Known for: Painting and sculpture
- Awards: Officier de la Légion d'honneur

Jean-Baptiste Auguste Clésinger (22 October 1814 – 5 January 1883) was a 19th-century French sculptor and painter.

== Life ==
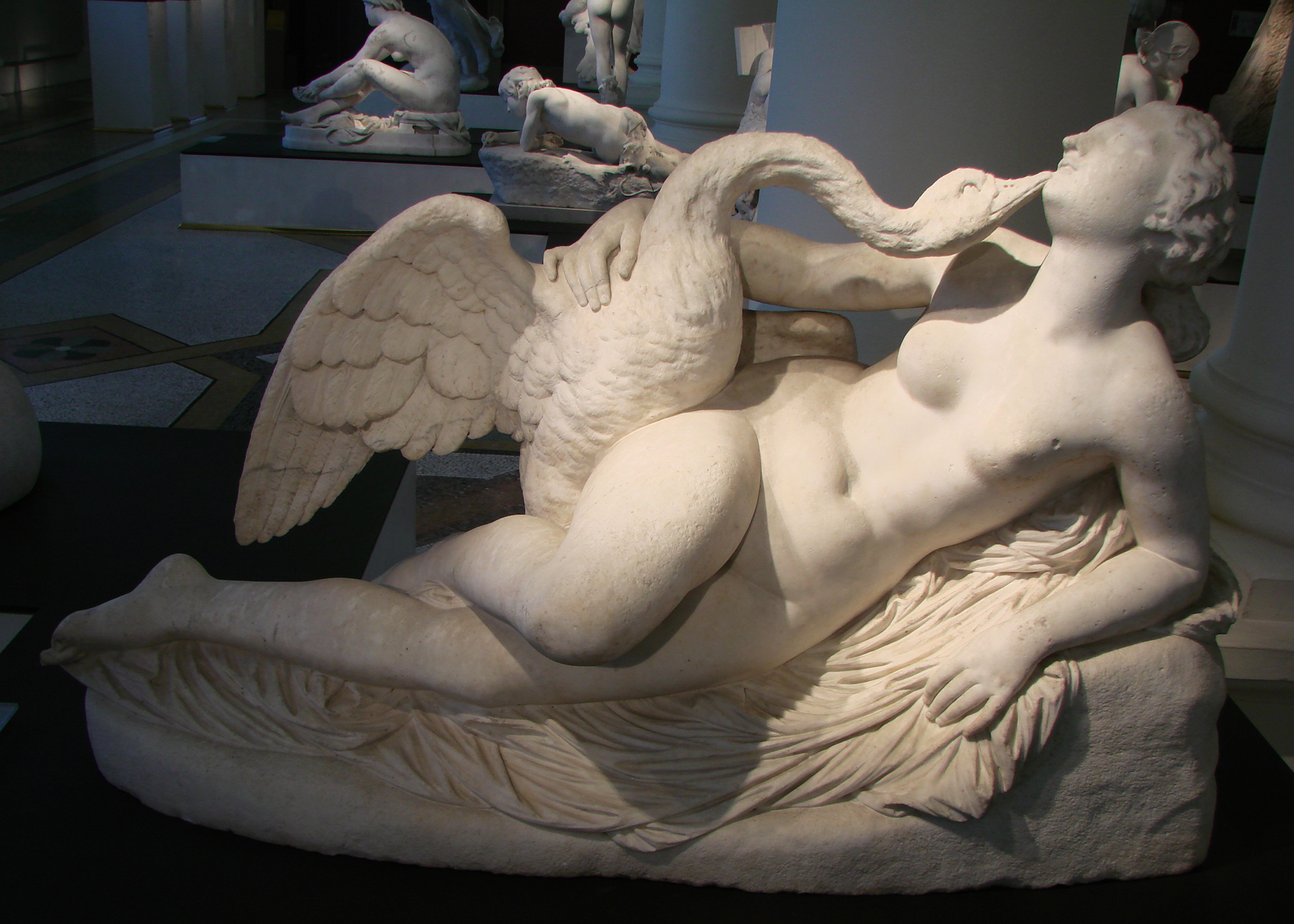
Leda and the swan, Musée de Picardie, Amiens

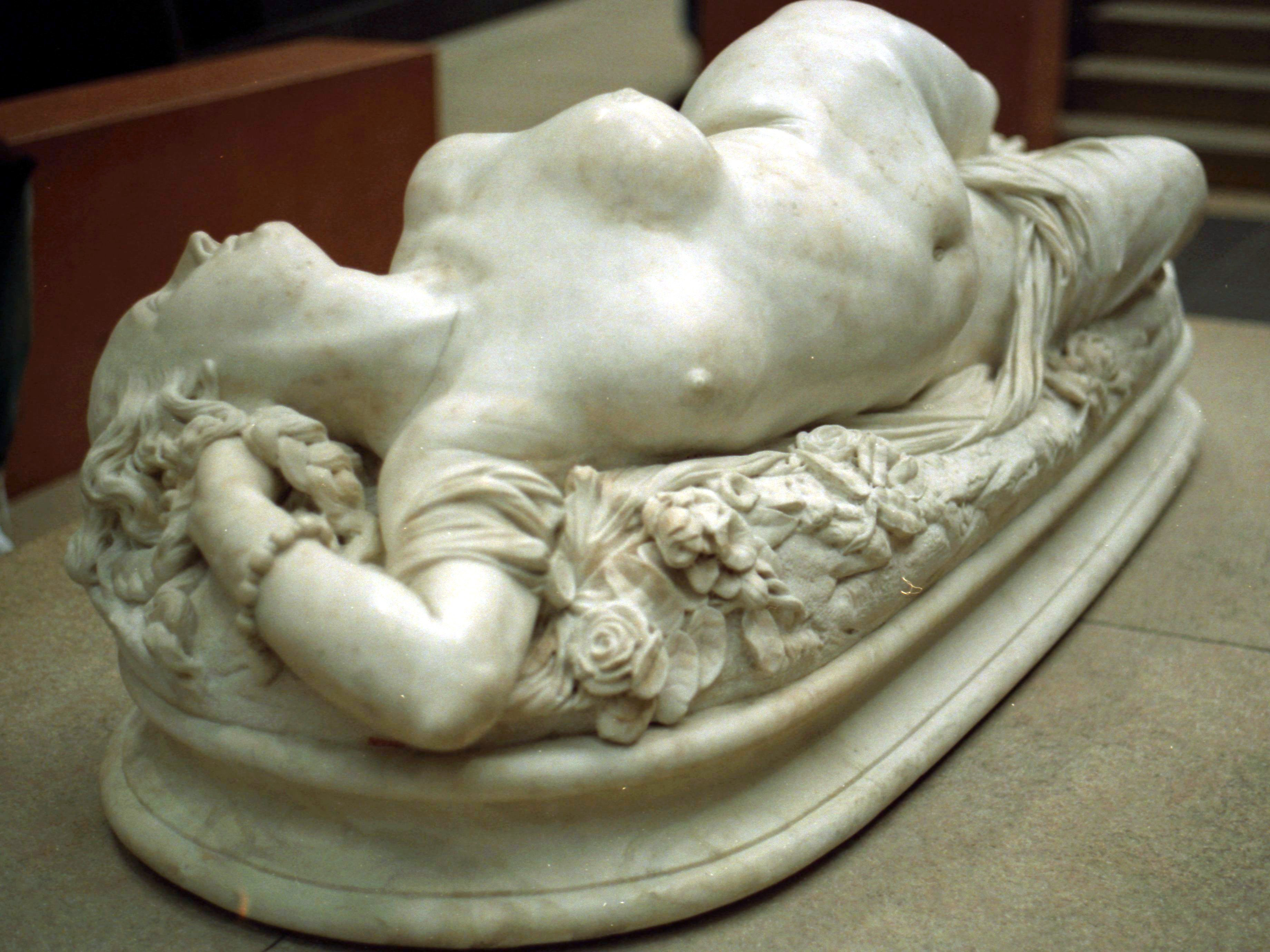
Woman Bitten by a Serpent, 1847, marble, Musée d'Orsay

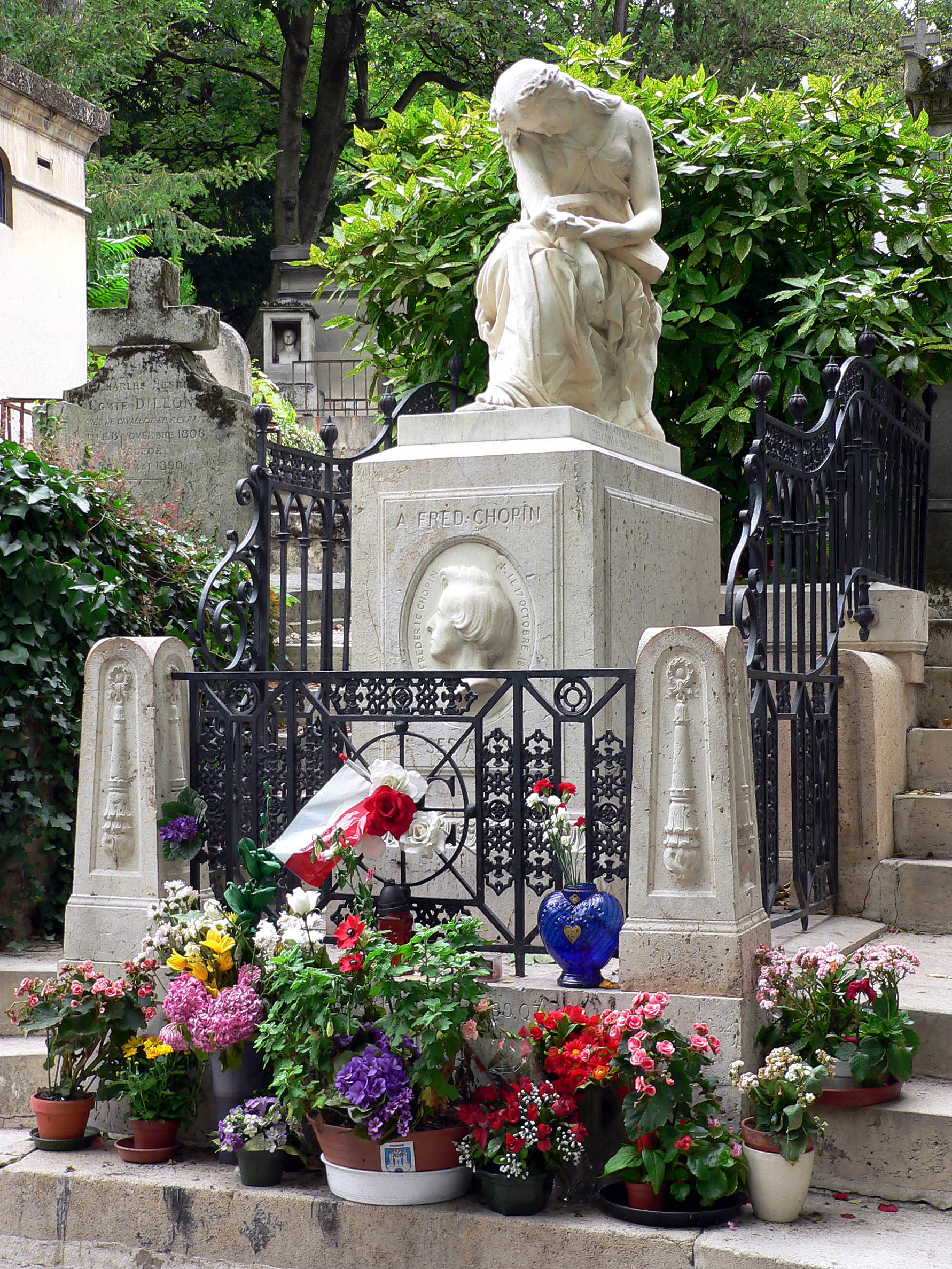
Euterpe, muse of Music, funerary monument at the grave of Frédéric Chopin, Père Lachaise Cemetery in Paris, by Auguste Clésinger (1850)

Auguste Clésinger was born in Besançon, in the Doubs department of France. His father, Georges-Philippe, was a sculptor and trained Auguste in art. Auguste first exhibited at the Paris Salon of 1843 with a bust of vicomte Jules de Valdahon and last exhibited there in 1864. At the Salon of 1847, he created a sensation with his Woman Bitten by a Serpent, produced from life-casts from his model Apollonie Sabatier (the pose being particularly suitable for such a method), thus reinforcing the scandal with an erotic dimension. Appolonie Sabatier was a salonnière and the mistress of Charles Baudelaire and others. The sculpture's beauty was praised by Théophile Gautier:

Clésinger has resolved this problem of making beauty without cuteness, without affectation, without mannerism, with a head and a body of our own time, in which can be recognised his mistress if she is beautiful.

Clésinger also portrayed Sabatier as herself, in an 1847 marble sculpture now at the Musée d'Orsay.

He produced busts of Rachel Félix and of Théophile Gautier, and a statue of Louise of Savoy (now in the Jardin du Luxembourg). He received the knight's cross of the Légion d'honneur in 1849 and rose to an officer of the order in 1864. In 1847, he married George Sand's daughter, Solange Dudevant. In 1849, the couple had a daughter, Jeanne, nicknamed Nini, who died in 1855 shortly after her parents' separation.

At the death of the composer-pianist Frédéric Chopin on 17 October 1849, Clésinger made Chopin's death mask and a cast of his hands. He also sculpted, in 1850, the white marble funerary monument of Euterpe, the muse of music, for Chopin's grave at the Père Lachaise Cemetery, in Paris.

Clésinger died in Paris on 5 January 1883. He is buried in the Père Lachaise Cemetery (division 10). His heir was his model and mistress Berthe de Courrière.

== Selected works ==
- 1847 : Woman Bitten by a Serpent, marble, Musée d'Orsay
- 1848 : Bacchante, a variation after the Woman bitten by a serpent, marble, Musée du Petit-Palais
- 1847 : Louise of Savoy, stone statue, Jardin du Luxembourg
- 1857 : Battle of the Roman bulls, painted plaster, Musée des Beaux-Arts de Besançon
- 1857 : The infant Hercules strangling the serpents of Envy, bronze, Musée d'Orsay
- 1869 : Nereid groupe en marbre, Musée des Beaux-Arts et d'archéologie de Besançon
- 1854 : Sappho, plaster, Musée municipal de Châlons-en-Champagne
- 1865 : Femme à la rose, bronze, Musée d'Orsay

=== Biblical art ===
He produced life-size statues for the side chapels of the Église de la Madeleine in Besançon, of the Via Dolorosa, the Pietà, the Entombment, the Resurrection and ascension.

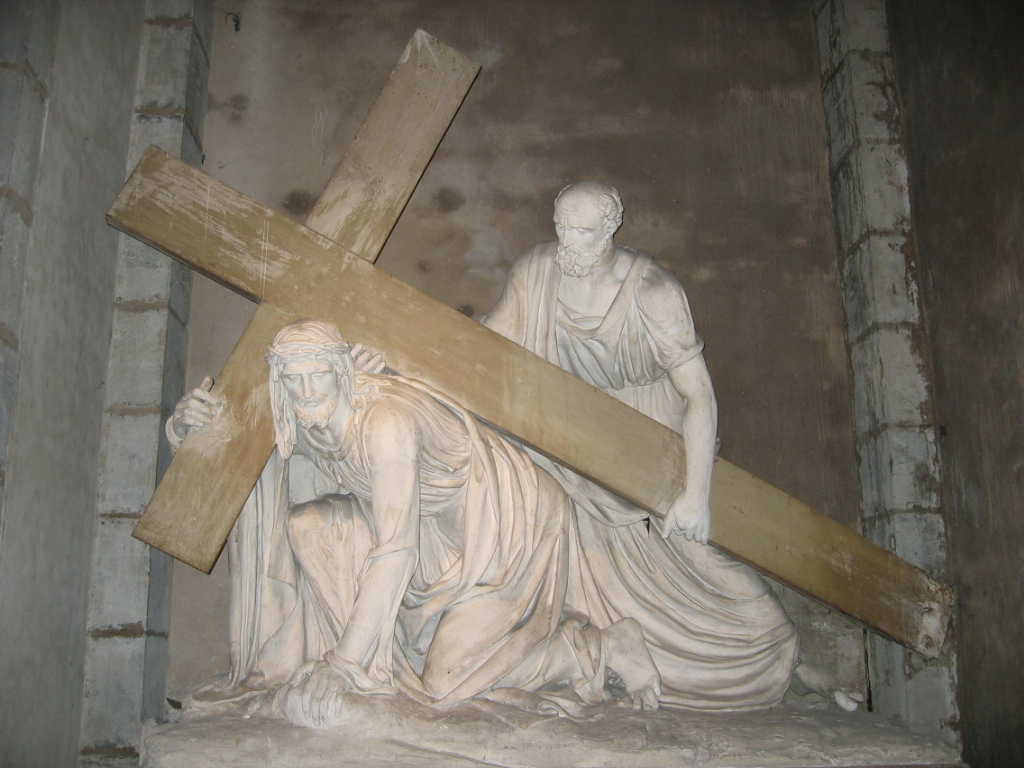
Via Dolorosa

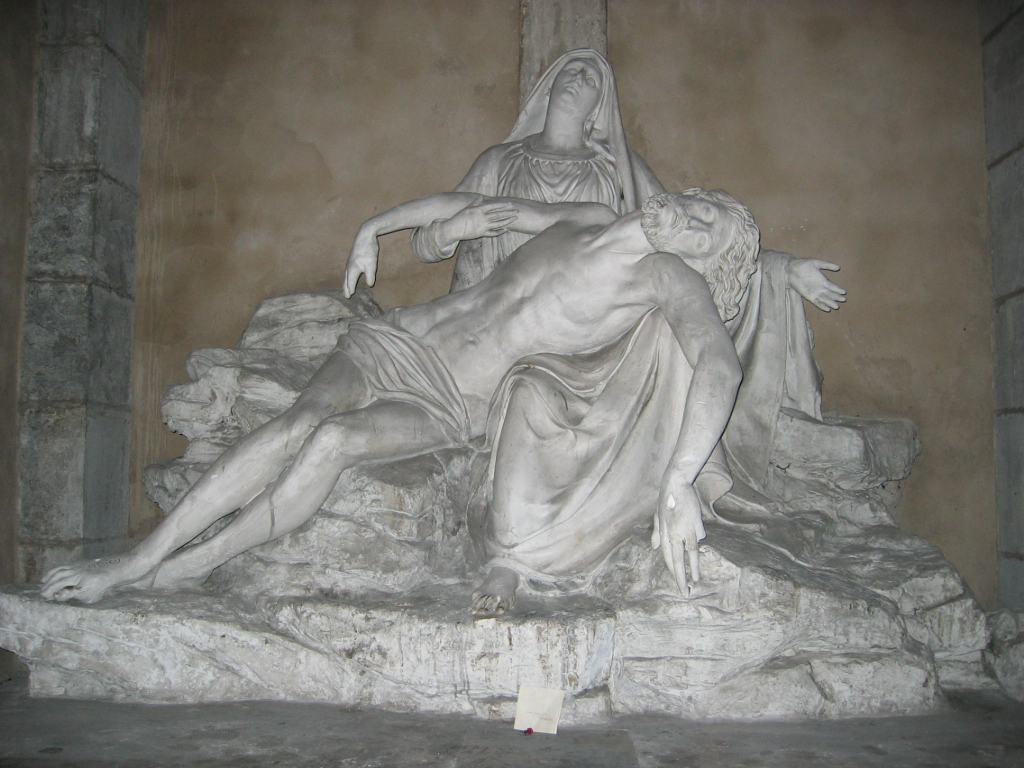
Pietà

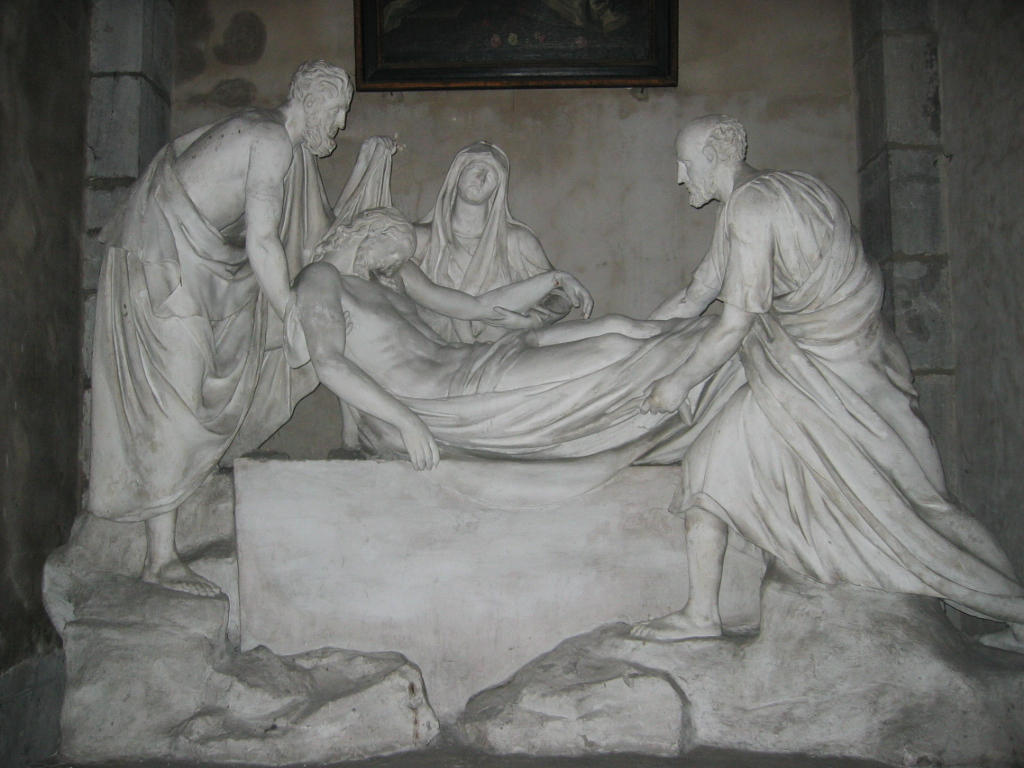
Entombment

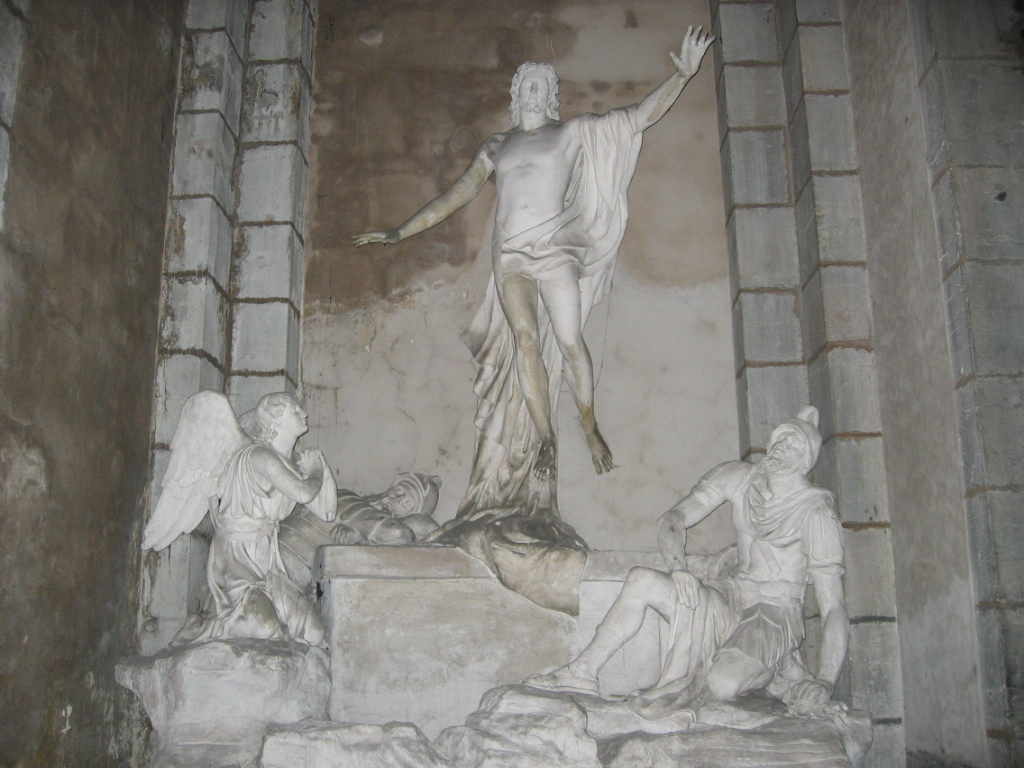
Resurrection
