= Louis Gustave Ricard =

French painter (1823–1873)

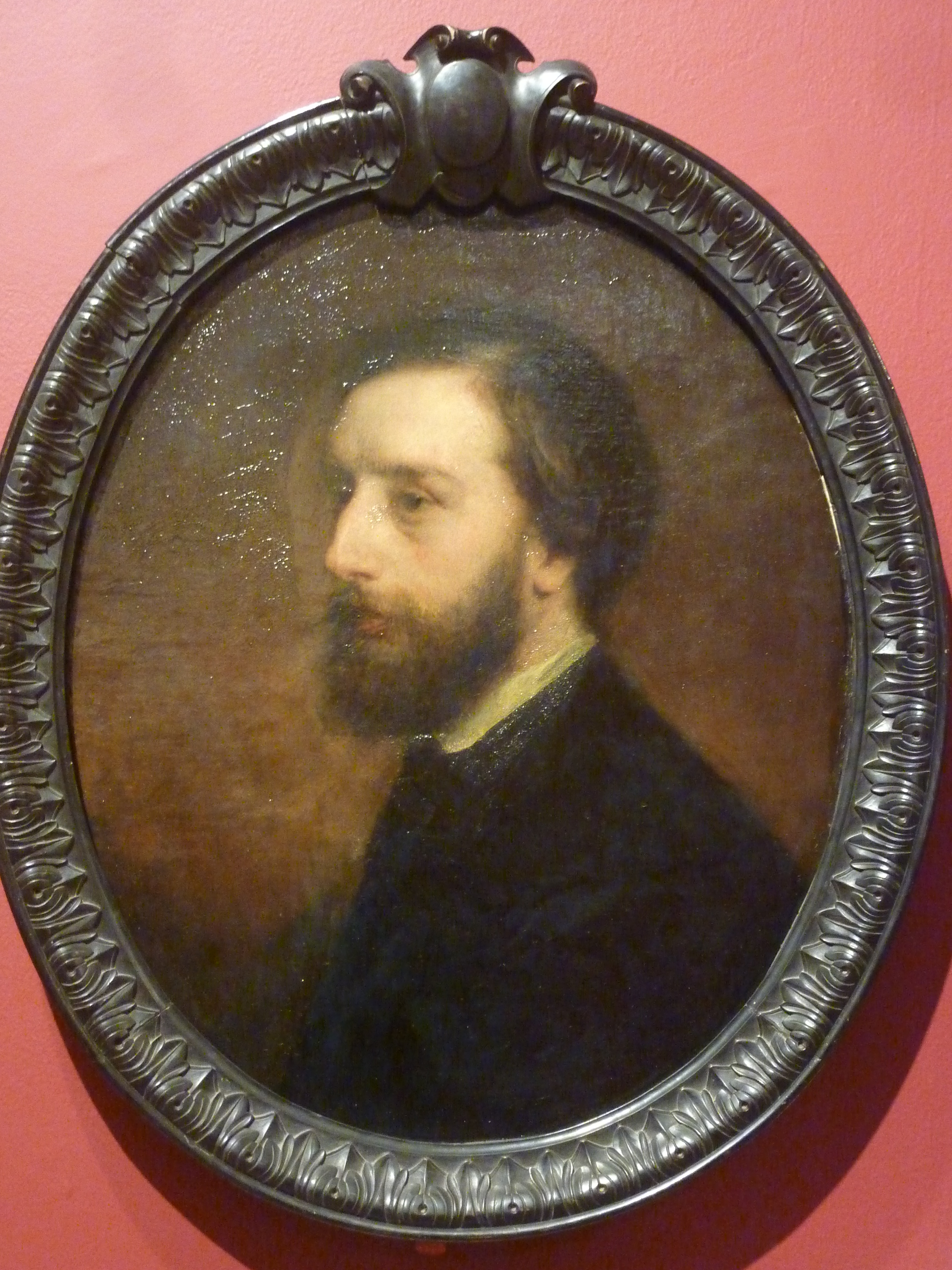
Self-portrait (c.1850)

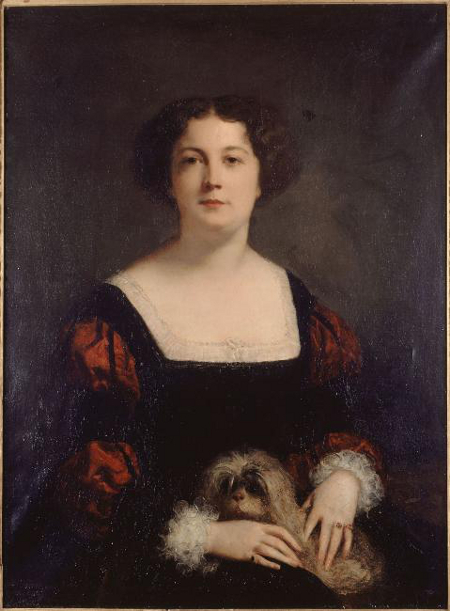
Portrait of Apollonie Sabatier

Louis Gustave Ricard (1 September 1823, Marseille – 23 January 1873, Paris) was a French painter, known primarily for his portraits.

== Biography ==
According to some sources, his family was originally from Florence and spelled their name "Ricoardi". His father was a well-off money changer and lender, which allowed him the time to attend courses at the École supérieure d'art et de design Marseille-Méditerranée. He also received private lessons from the portraitist, Pierre Bronzet, about whom little is known. In 1843, he received permission from his father to go to Paris, where he enrolled at the École nationale supérieure des beaux-arts and studied history painting with Léon Cogniet. He also copied the Old Masters at the Louvre and competed (unsuccessfully) for the Prix de Rome.

This was followed by a study trip to Italy and the Netherlands. He had his first exhibit at the Salon of 1850 and was awarded a second-class medal. In 1852, his portrait of Adélaïde-Louise d'Eckmühl de Blocqueville earned him a first-class medal. He exhibited nine portraits at the Exposition Universelle (1855). They received honorable mention. He sent eight portraits to the Salon of 1857 and ten to the Salon of 1859, including one of Raymond-Théodore Troplong, President of the French Senate. After that, tired of being denied the Legion of Honor, he renounced official competitions and focused on his private clientele. He was apparently quite selective, however, seeking out those whose heads he liked and refusing to paint those whose heads he found disagreeable. Many of his portraits are of other painters.

During the last ten years of his life, preoccupied with equaling the Old Masters (especially Da Vinci and Rembrandt), he began to use unnatural lighting effects; blurring outlines and creating melancholic or dreamy expressions. Many of these works have an indecisive character. His portrait of Paul de Musset, exhibited at the Salon of 1872, is considered to be a prime example. Some of this attitude is credited to the influence of his beloved sister, a nun in Nancy, who he visited frequently and spoke with at length.

During the Franco-Prussian War, he lived in England. He died suddenly, of a heart attack, while having lunch with a friend. A retrospective was held shortly after at the École. Later that year, a psychological study of him by Charles Yriarte was published in the Gazette des Beaux-Arts.
