= Charles Jalabert =

French painter (1819–1901)

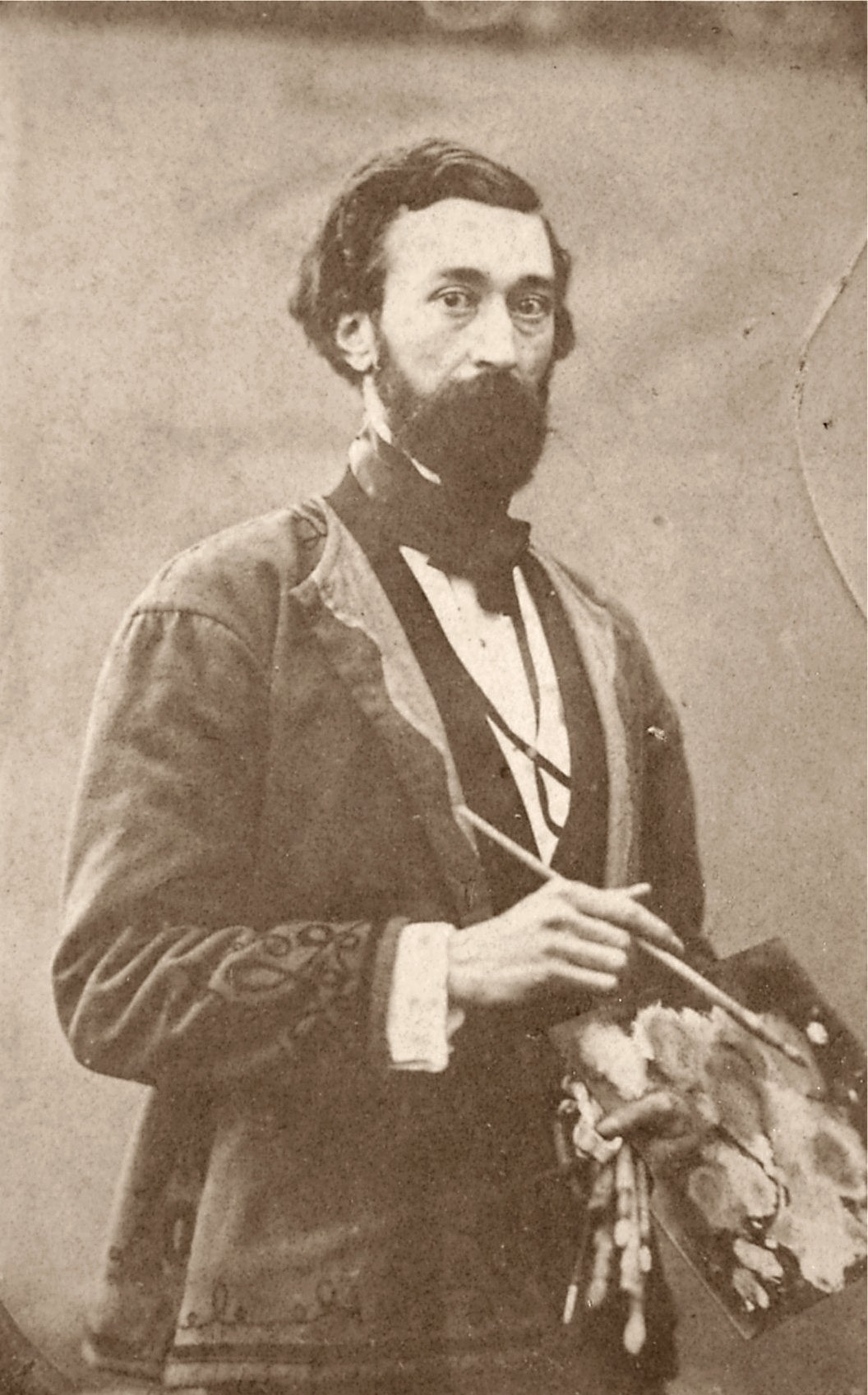
Charles François Jalabert

Charles François Jalabert (1819–1901) was a French painter in the academic style. He rapidly gained renown as an artist among Parisian high society in the second half of the 19th century and attended the salon of Madame Sabatier. Some of his works are now in the Musée des Beaux-Arts de Nîmes.

Jalabert was born in Nîmes. One of his most famous works was the oil on canvas painting called The Plague of Thebes. The painting referred to the Athenian tragedy Oedipus Rex by Sophocles. Thebes is ravaged by plague as a result of the corruption in the place and the murderer of Laius, the former king of the city. The attempts of Oedipus, the incumbent ruler, to allay the plague bring him only to the realization that he is the cause of the plague. His murdering his own father and marrying his mother, he comes to see, is what brought the curse to Thebes. The Plague of Thebes, and other famous works of Jalabert's, like Oedipus and Antigone, are now on display at the Musée des Beaux-Arts de Nîmes.

== Gallery ==
Selected art

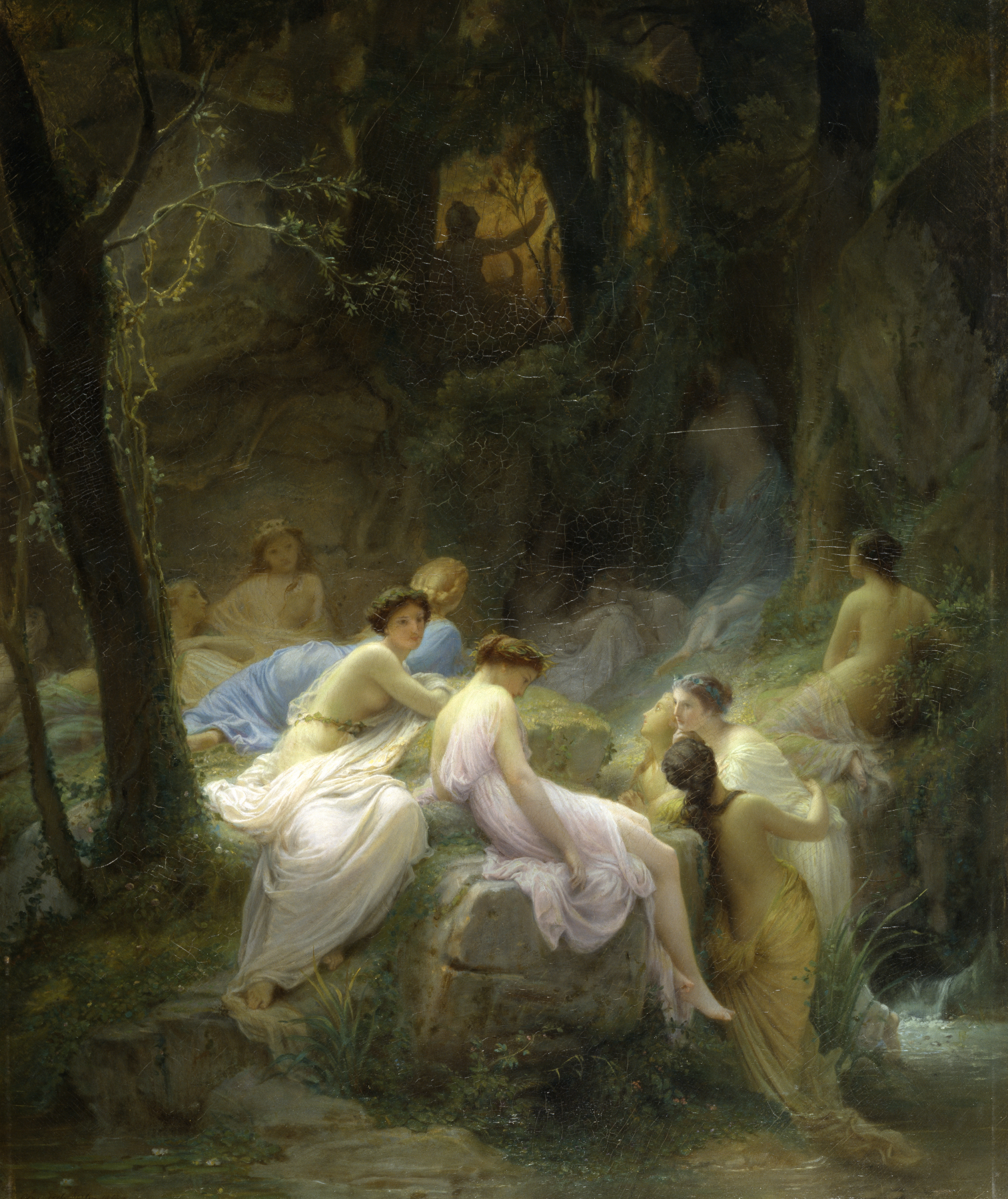
Nymphs Listening to the Songs of Orpheus (1853), Walters Art Museum.

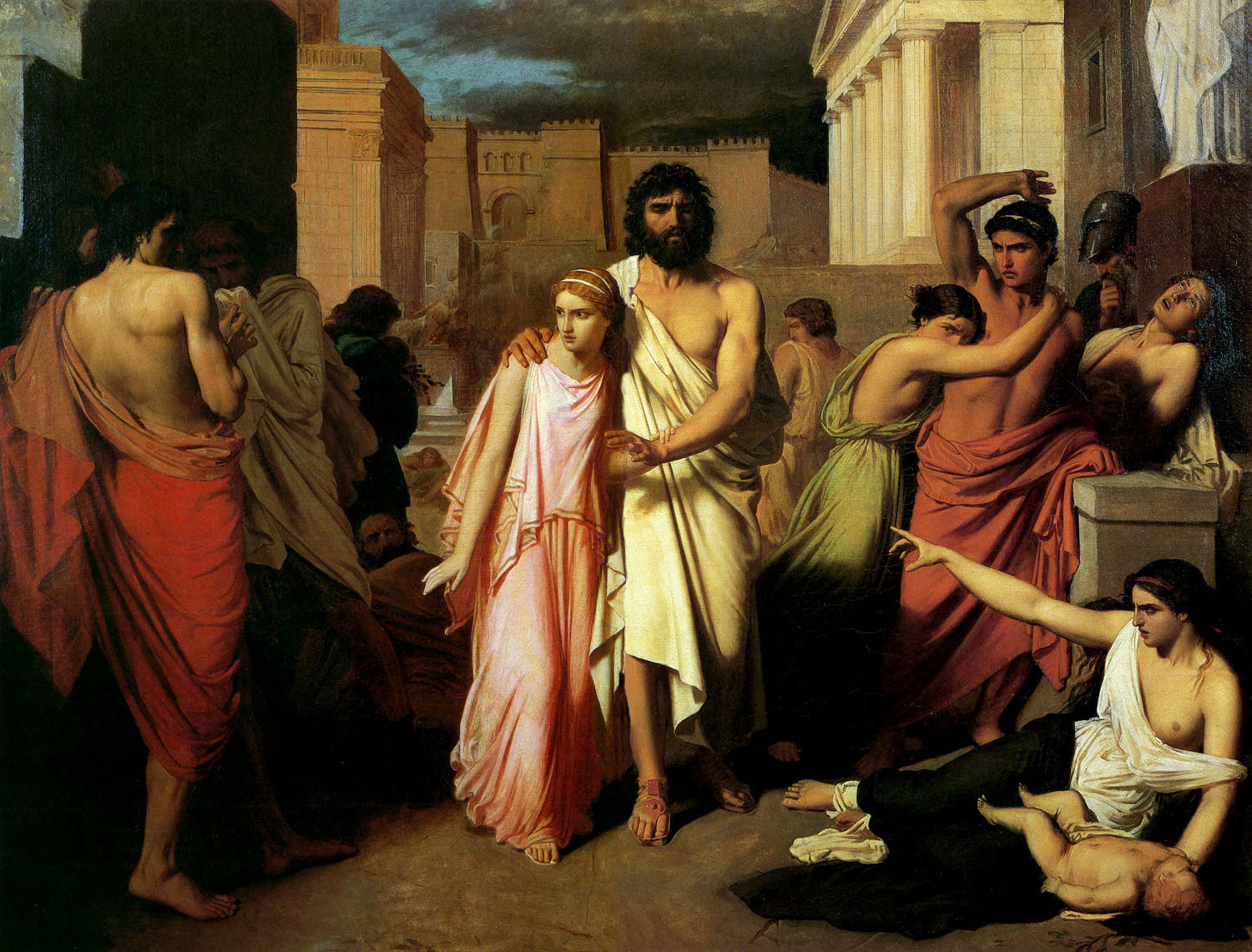
The Plague of Thebes: Oedipus and Antigone (1842), Musée des beaux-arts de Marseille\

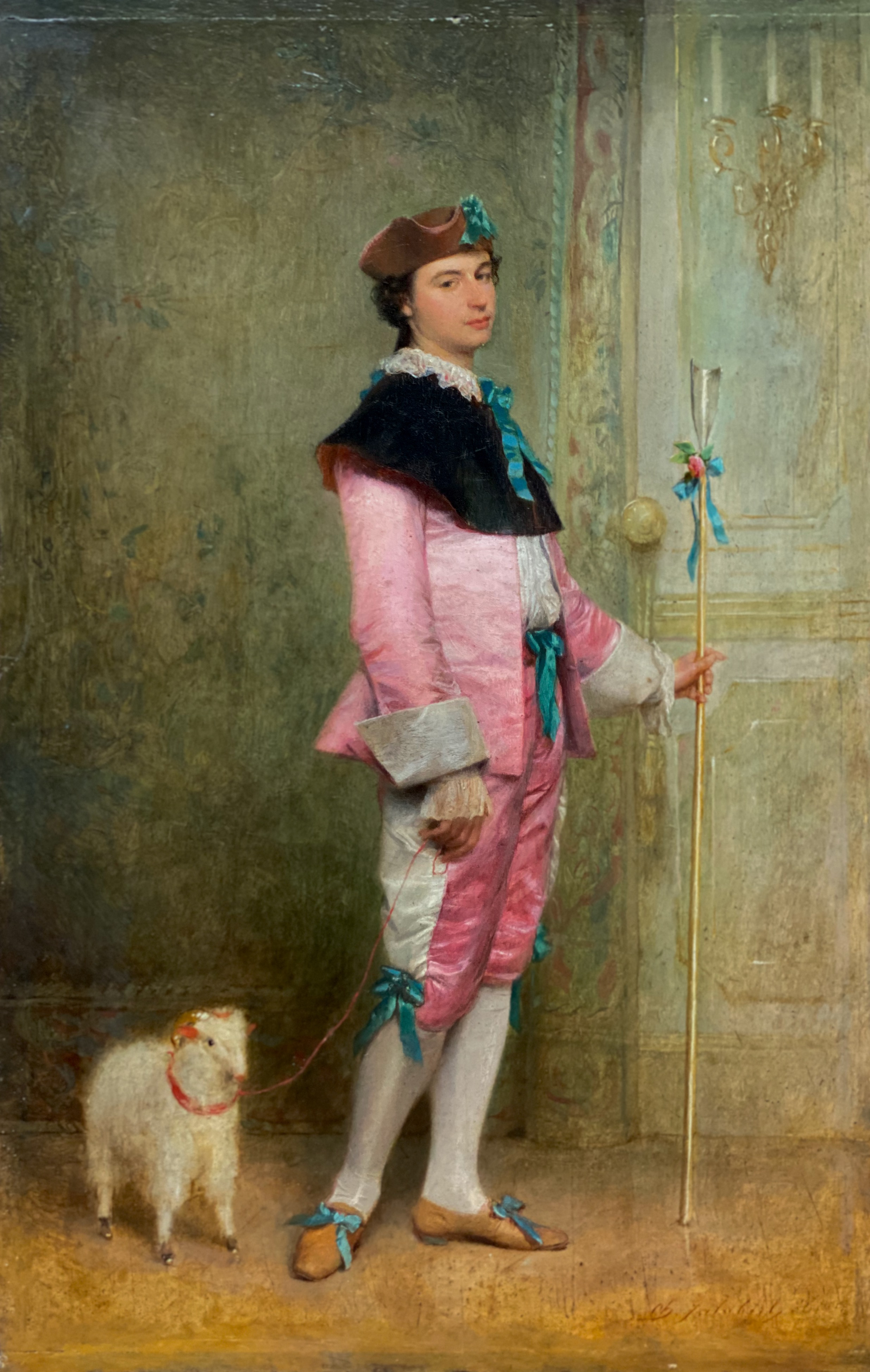
Souvenir de Carnaval (1861), 29 x 18,5 cm, oil on panel. private collection

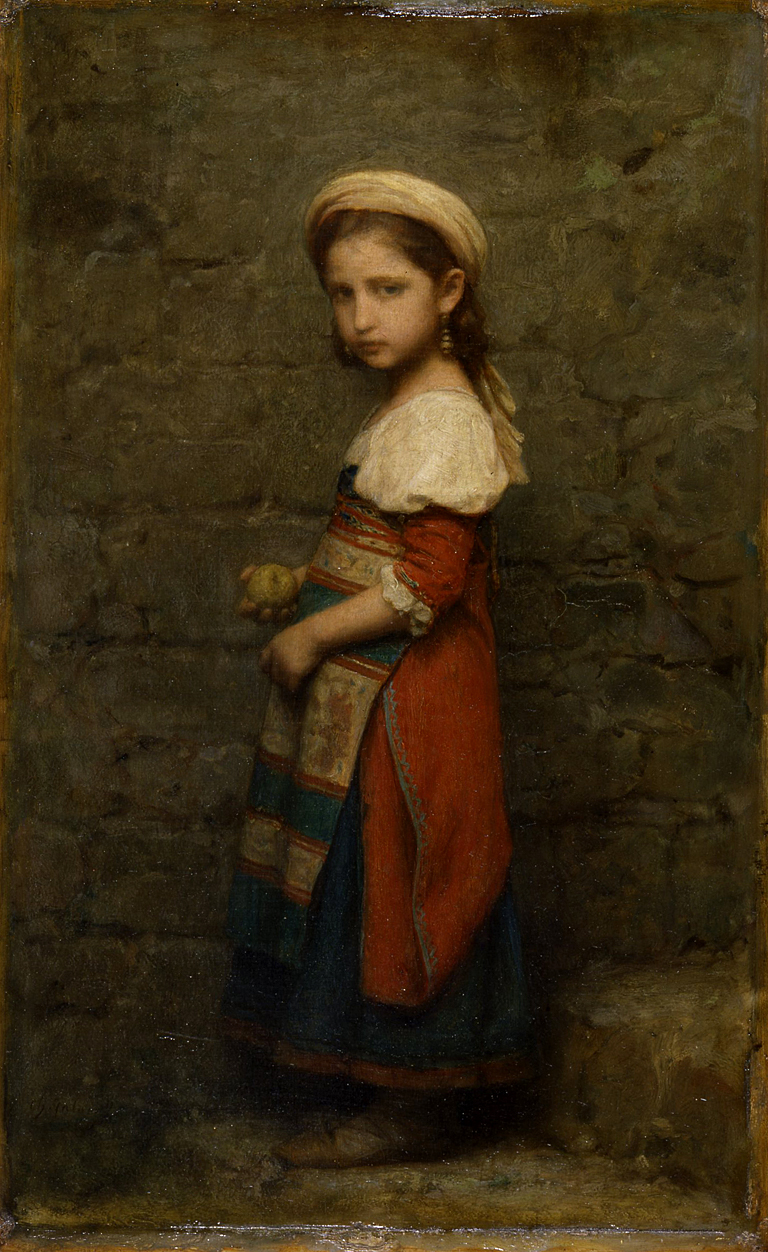
Italian Girl (after 1862), Walters Art Museum

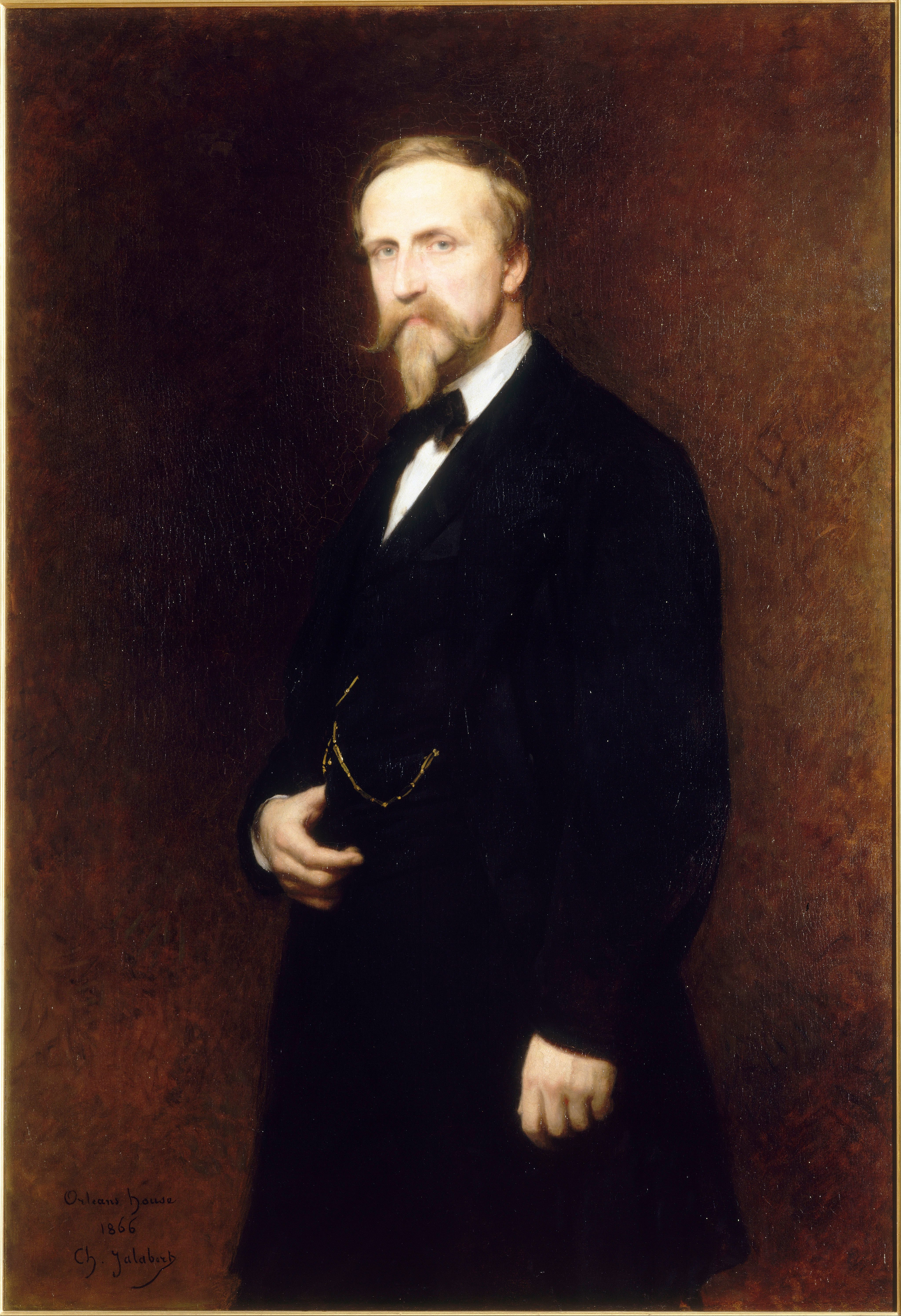
Portrait of Henri d'Orléans (1866), Musée Condé
