= Vincent Vidal =

French painter

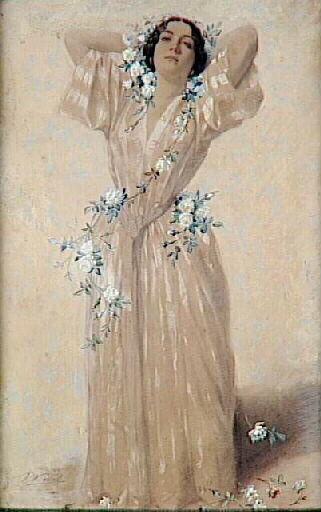
Portrait of Apollonie Sabatier, watercolor and gouache on paper

Vincent Vidal (20 January 1811 in Carcassonne – 1887 in Paris) was a French painter, pastellist, and watercolourist. He entered the École des Beaux-Arts in 1837 and studied under Paul Delaroche. From 1843 to 1887, he exhibited regularly at the Salon, where he was awarded a third-class medal in 1844 and a second-class medal in 1849.

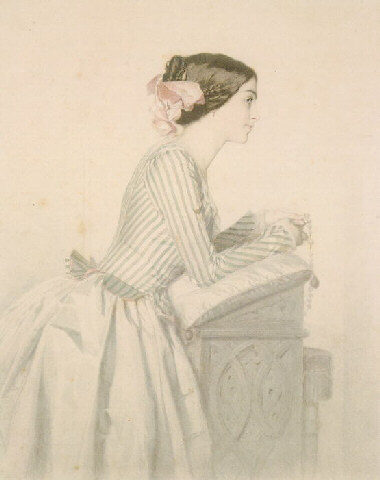
Young woman reciting the rosary, watercolor on paper

Vidal was noted especially for his portraits of fashionable Parisian women. His famous sitters included Alexandre Dumas and Empress Eugenie. Vidal was awarded the Légion d'honneur in 1852.
