= Alfred Mosselman =

Belgian aristocrat and industrialist

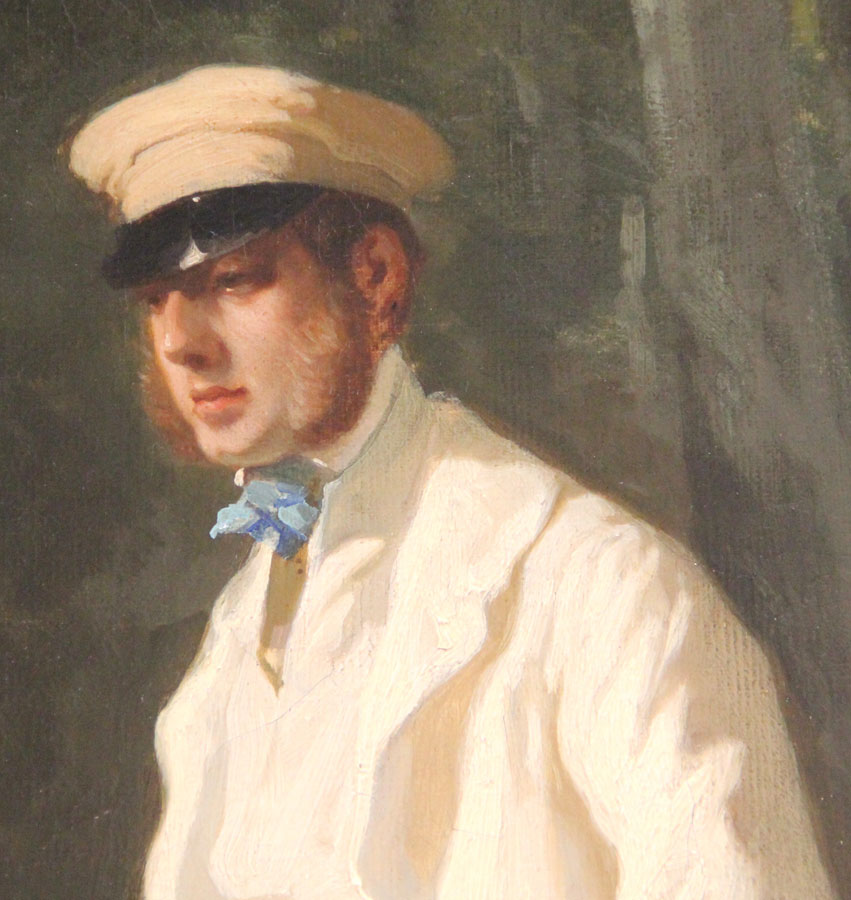
Detail from Portrait of Mr and Mrs Mosselman and their two daughters, by Alfred de Dreux

Alfred Mosselman or Alfred Mosselmann (1810–1867) was a Belgian aristocrat and industrialist who made a fortune in canal- and road-building. He was also a patron of the arts, particularly of his long-time lover Apollonie Sabatier.
