= Edmond Richard (writer) =

French biographer

- Writing career
- Language: French

Edmond Richard was a French writer, as well as being the first biographer and last lover of Apollonie Sabatier.
