= Salon of 1847 =

1847 art exhibition in Paris

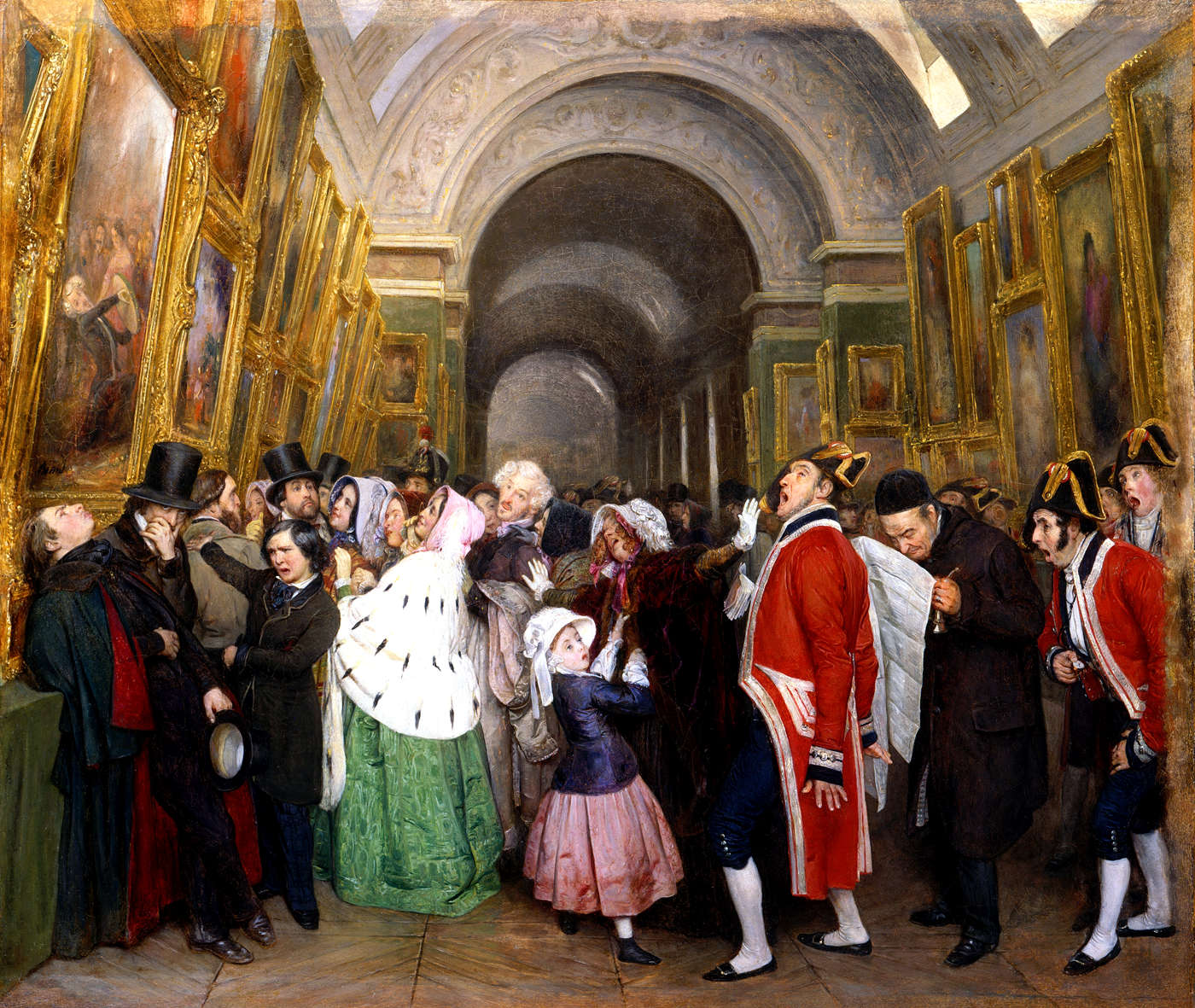
Four O'Clock at the Salon by François-Auguste Biard

The Salon of 1847 was an art exhibition held at the Louvre in Paris between 1 May and 15 August 1847. Organised by the Académie des Beaux-Arts, it took place in the Louvre's Salon Carré and Grande Galerie. One of the exhibited paintings Four O'Clock at the Salon by François-Auguste Biard, specifically displays the Grande Galerie at closing time during the Salon. Horace Vernet presented his Louis Philippe and His Sons ,commissioned for the Palace of Versailles. Thomas Couture enjoyed great success with his history painting The Romans in their Decadence.

Amongst other works on display were the biblical scene Judith at the Gates of Bethulia by Jules-Claude Ziegler and The Cock Fight by Jean-Léon Gérôme. The sculptor Auguste Clésinger displayed the marble Woman Bitten by a Serpent

Stylistically Romanticism remained prominent. The Salon was held towards the end of the July Monarchy before the overthrow of Louis Philippe I in the French Revolution of 1848.

== Gallery ==
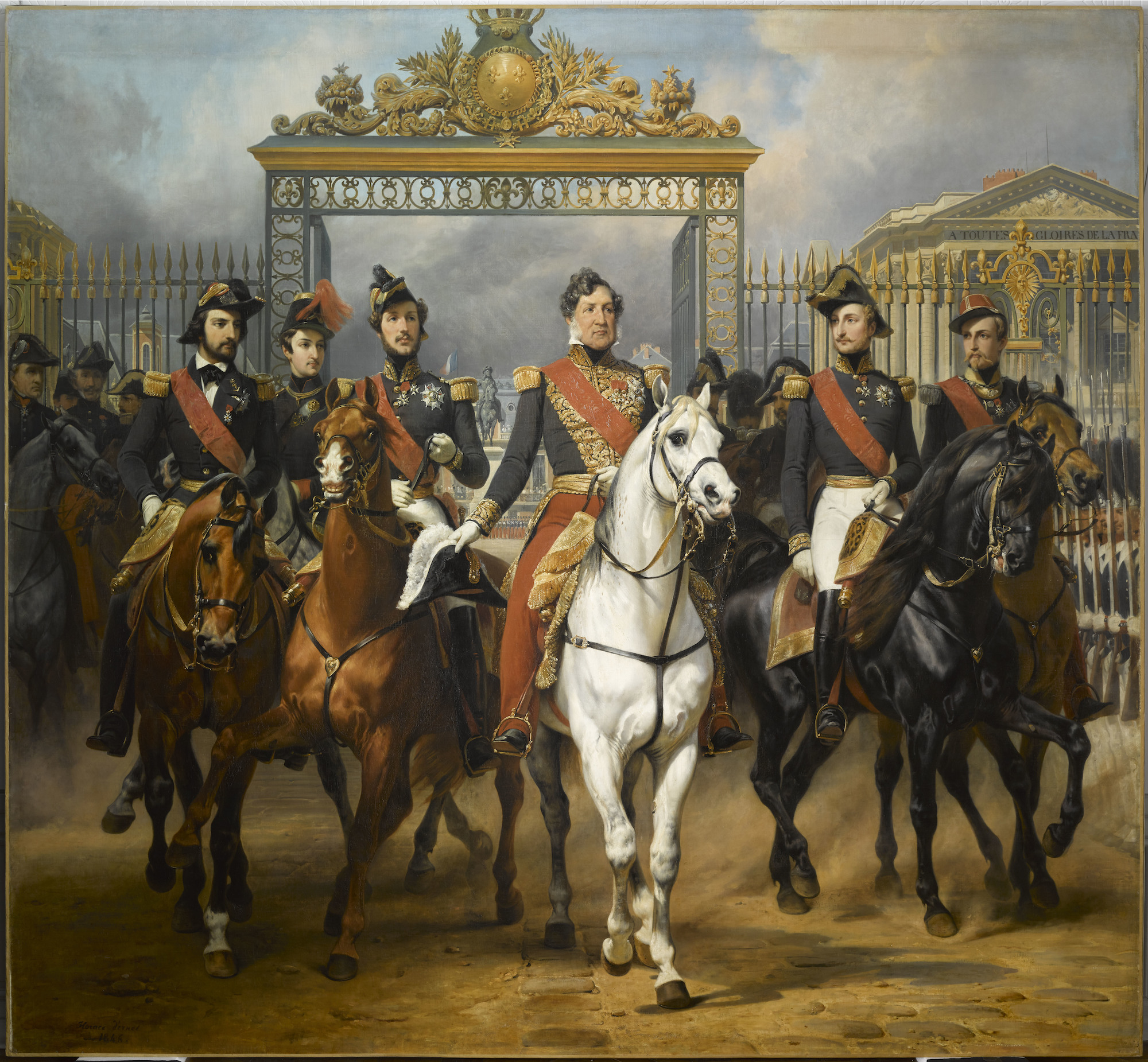
Louis Philippe and His Sons by Horace Vernet

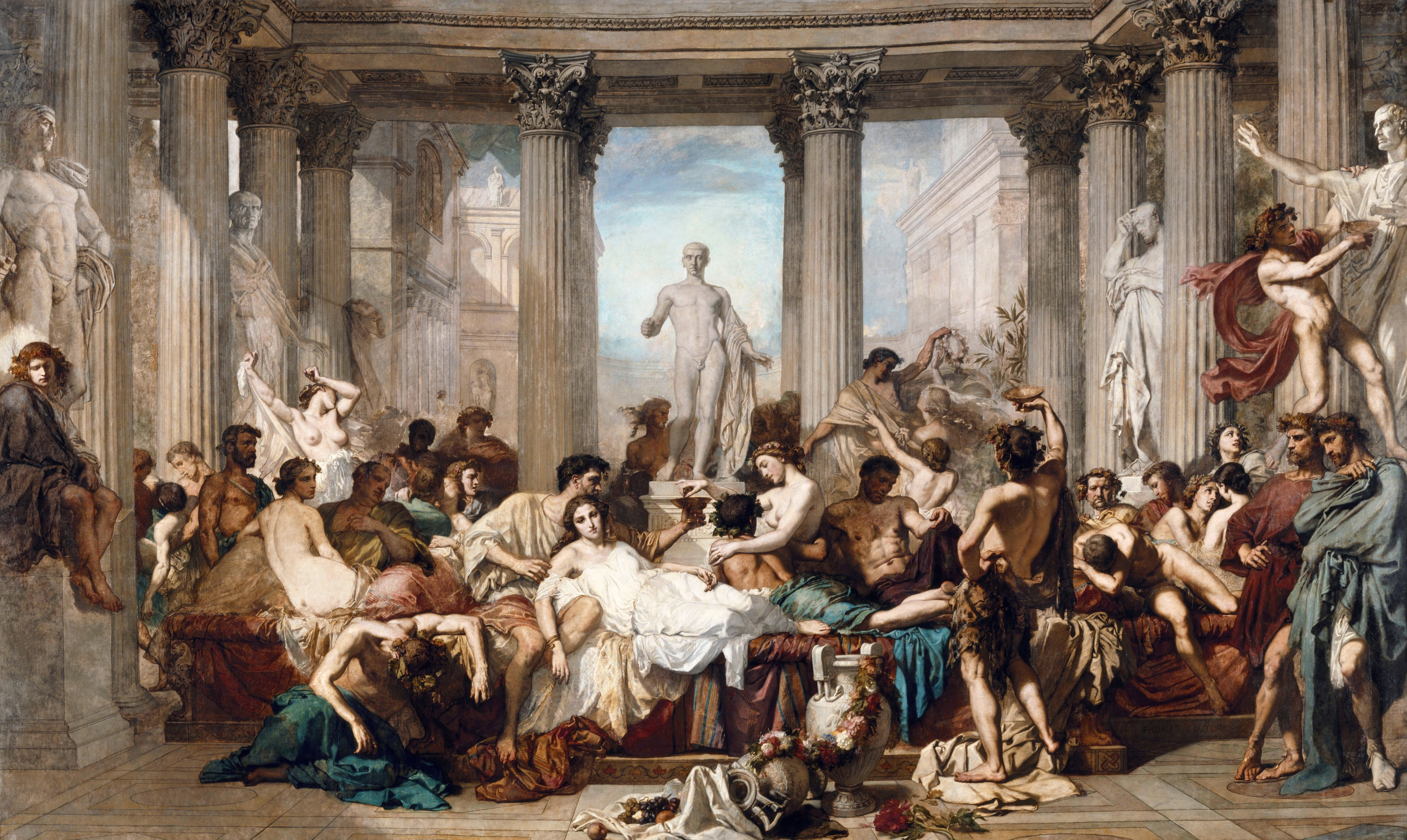
The Romans in their Decadence by Thomas Couture

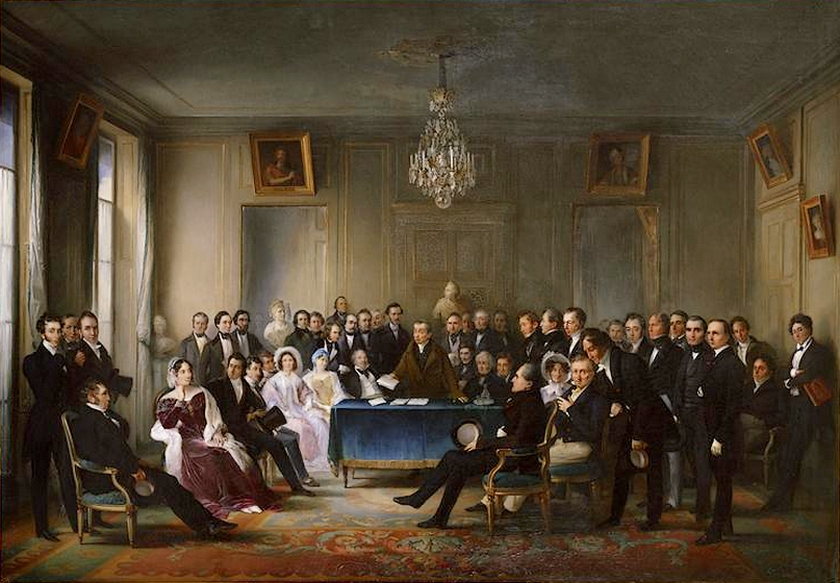
Andrieux Giving a Reading in the Foyer of the Comédie-Française by François Joseph Heim

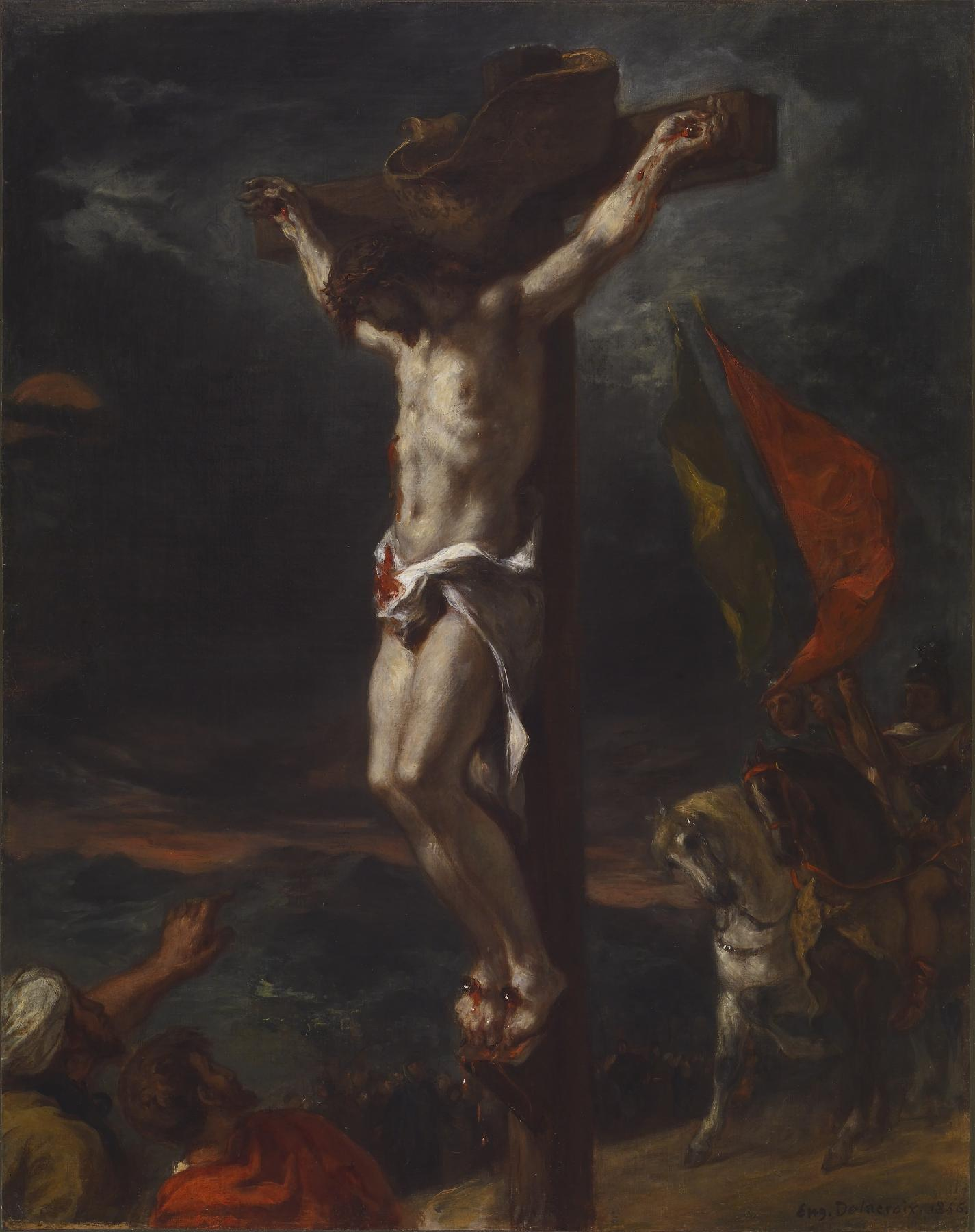
Christ on the Cross by Eugène Delacroix

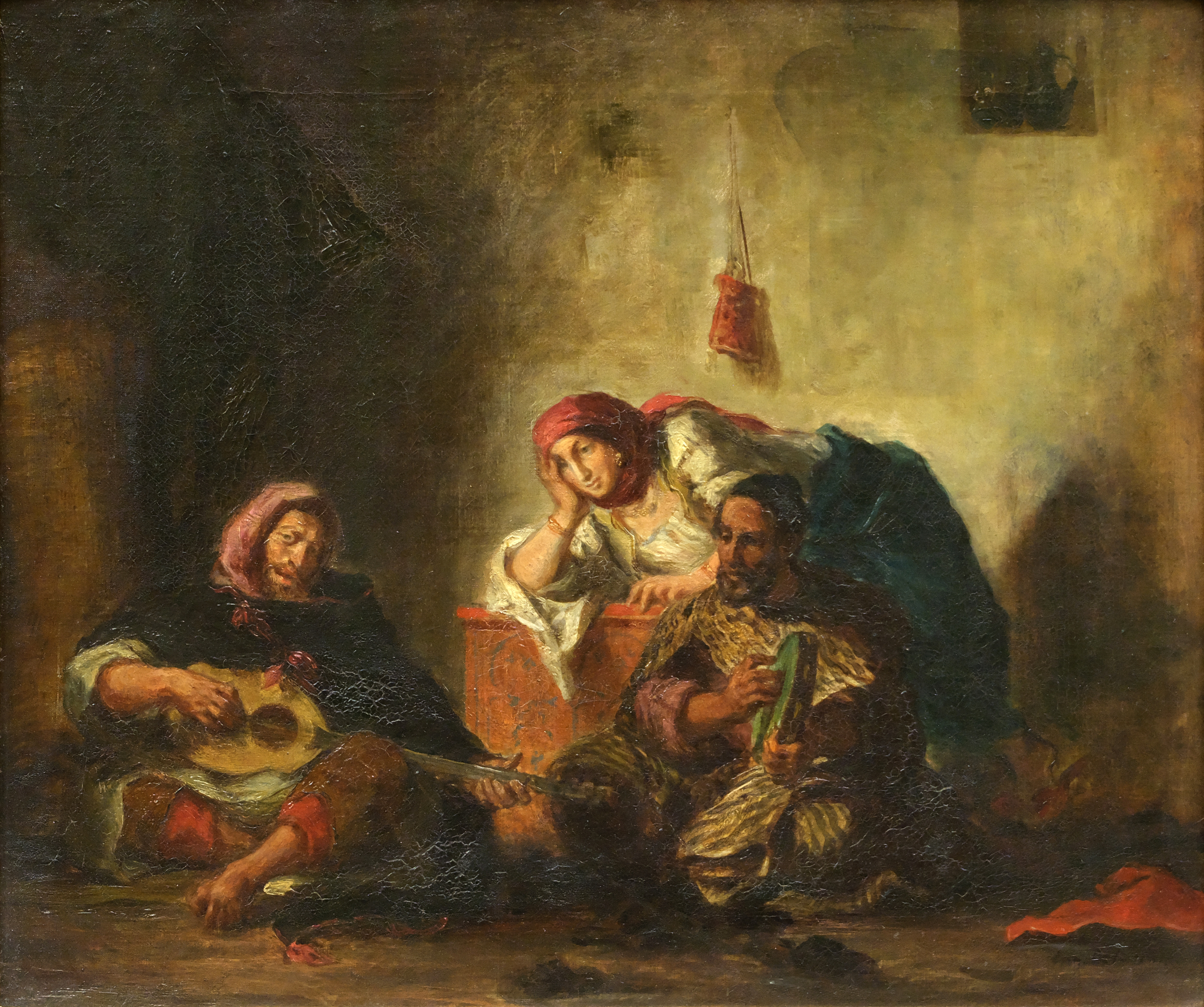
Jewish Musicians in Mogador by Eugène Delacroix

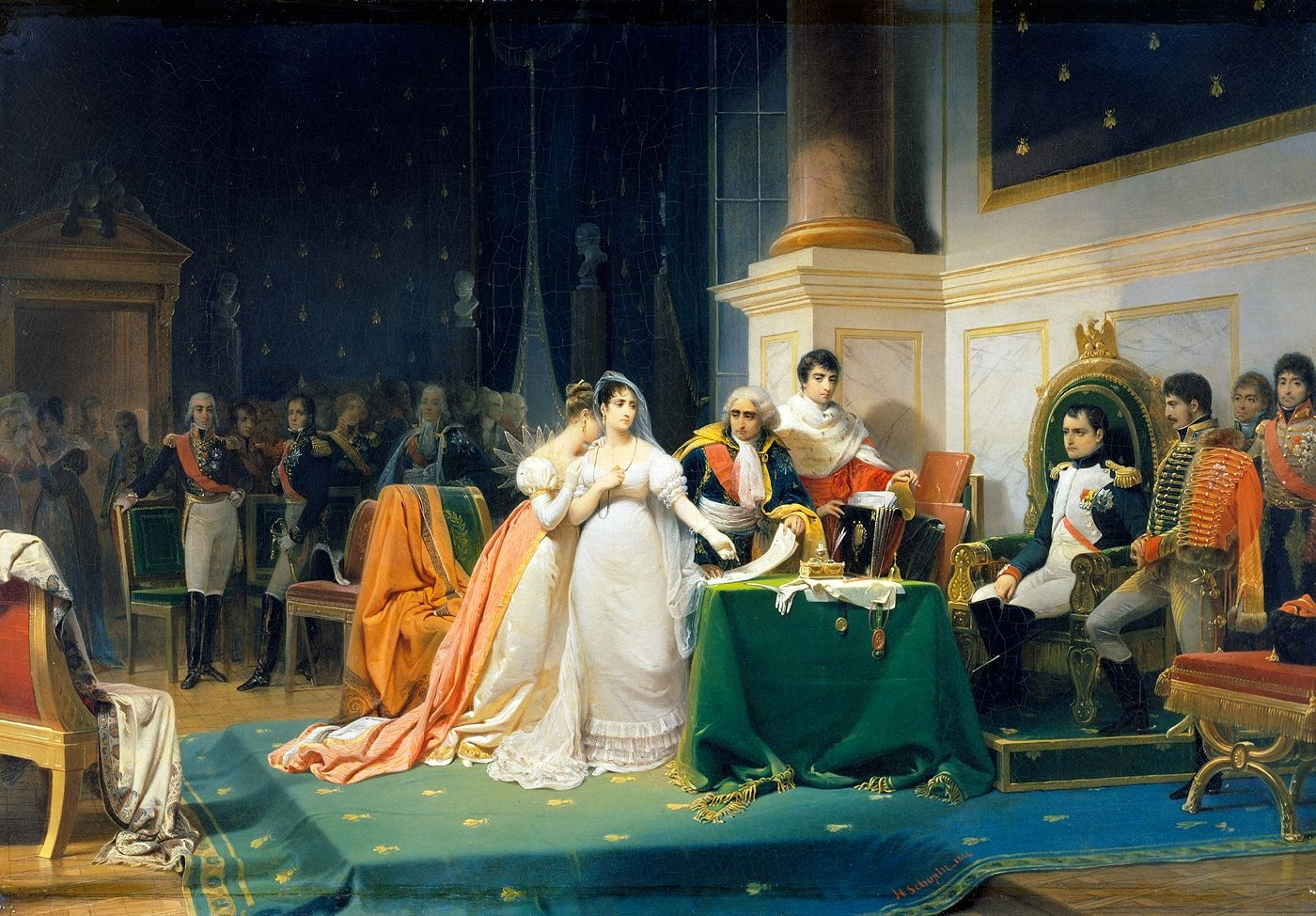
The Divorce of the Empress Josephine by Henri Frédéric Schopin

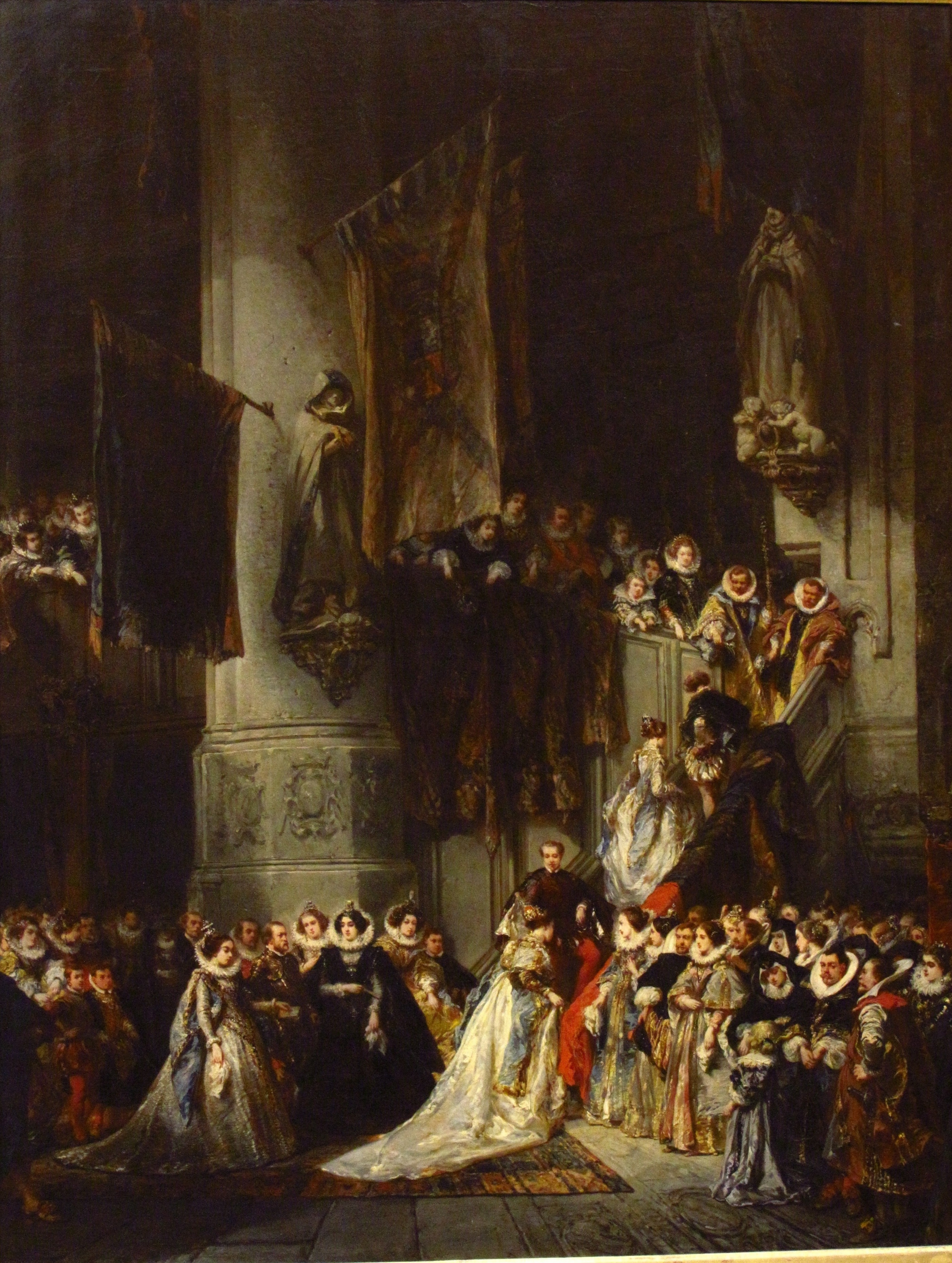
A Ceremony in the Church of Delft by Eugène Isabey

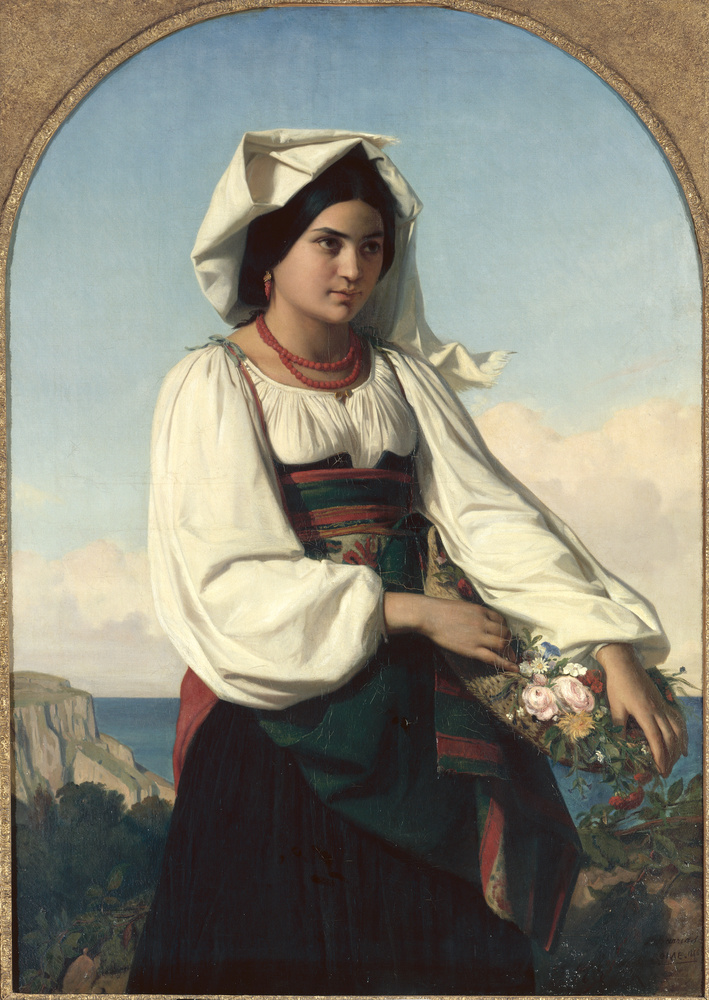
Young Girl Carrying Flowers by Félix-Joseph Barrias

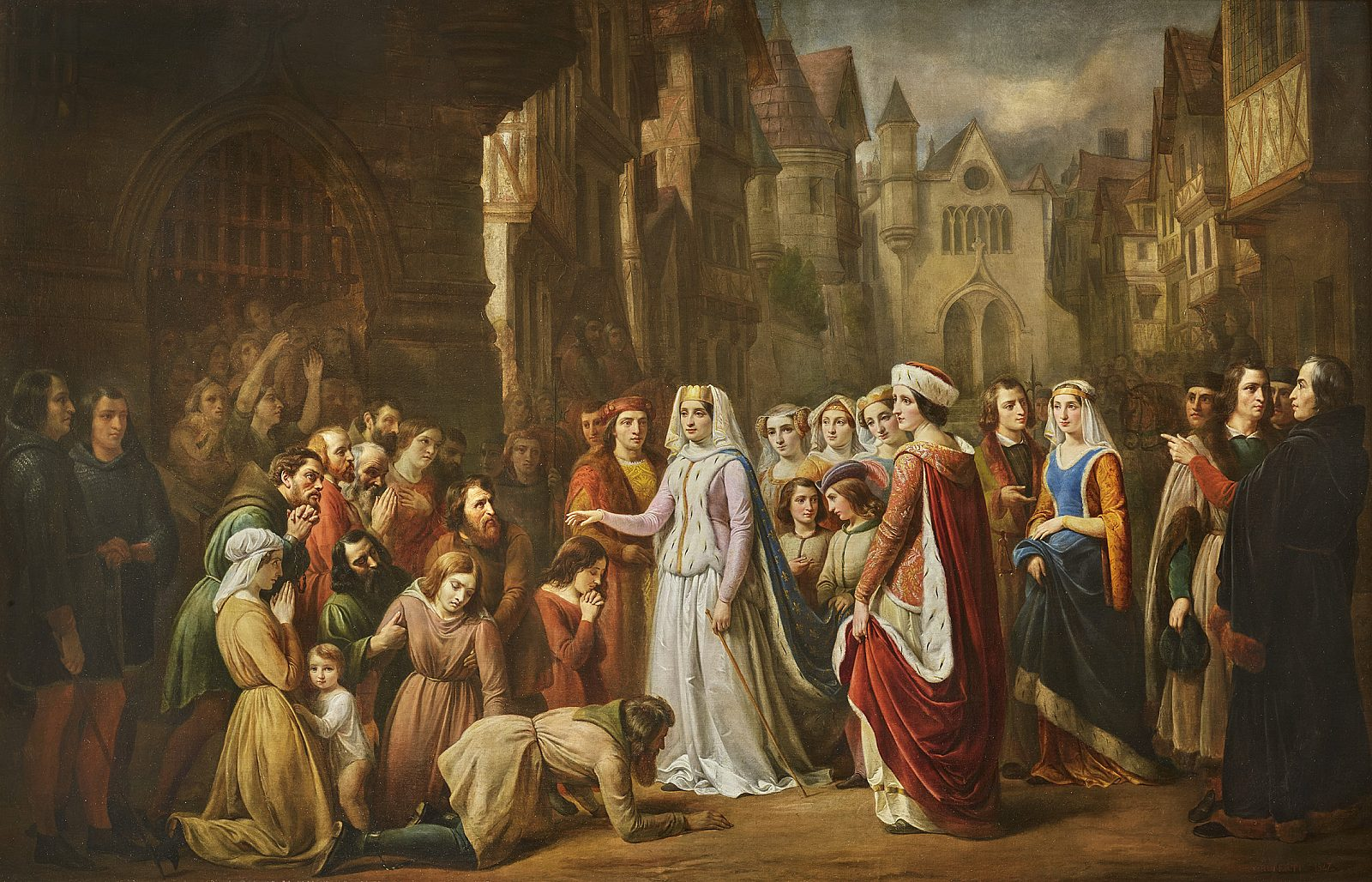
Queen Blanche of Castile, Regent of France, Freeing Prisoners by Albert Roberti

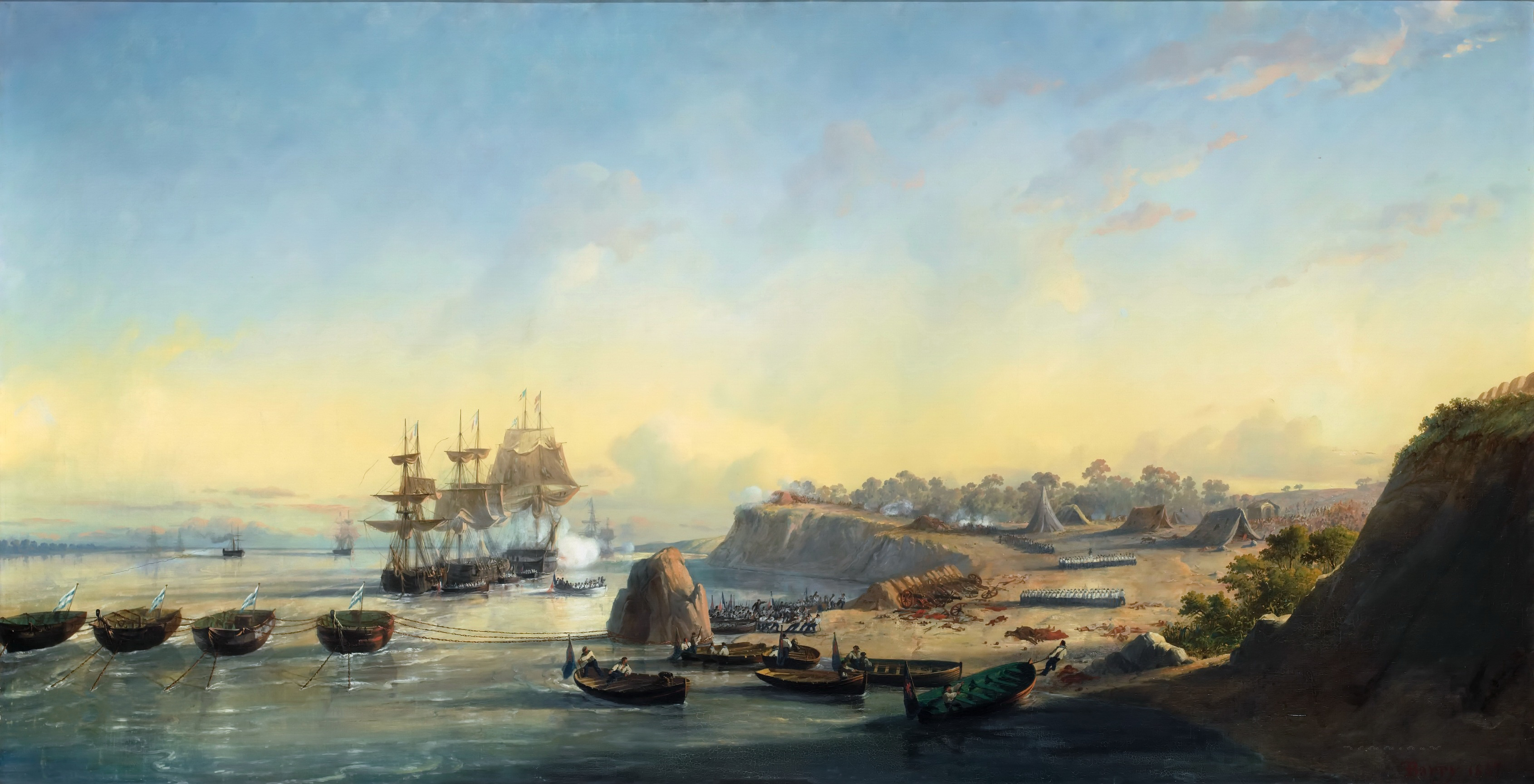
Attack on the Batteries of Ponto Obligado by François Pierre Barry

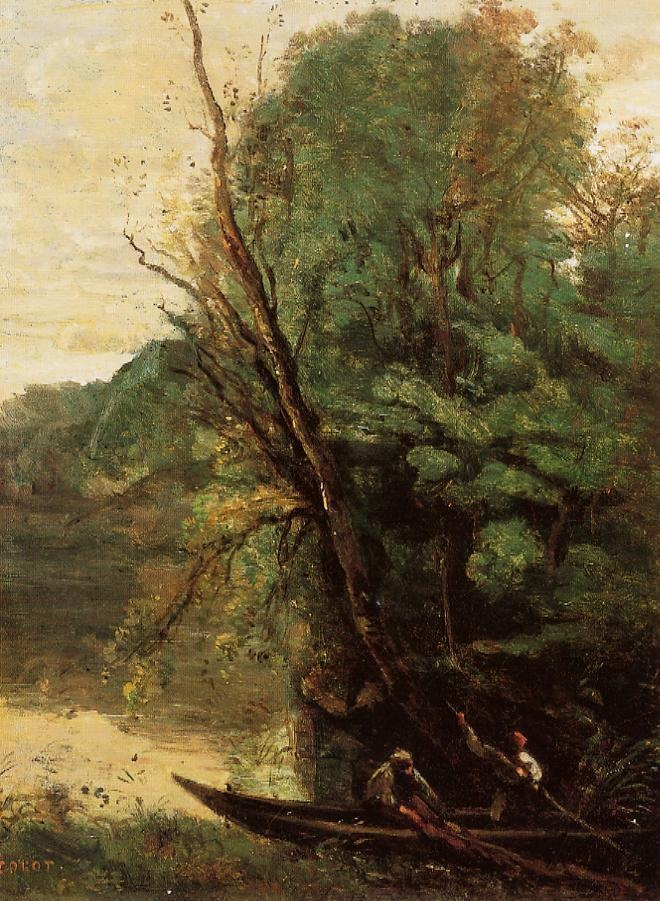
Fishing with Nets, Evening by Jean-Baptiste-Camille Corot

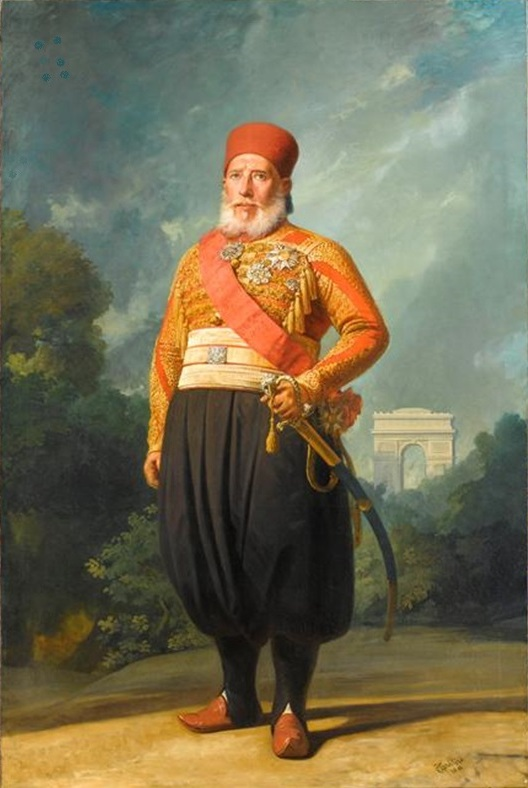
Portrait of Ibrahim Pasha of Egypt by Charles-Philippe Larivière

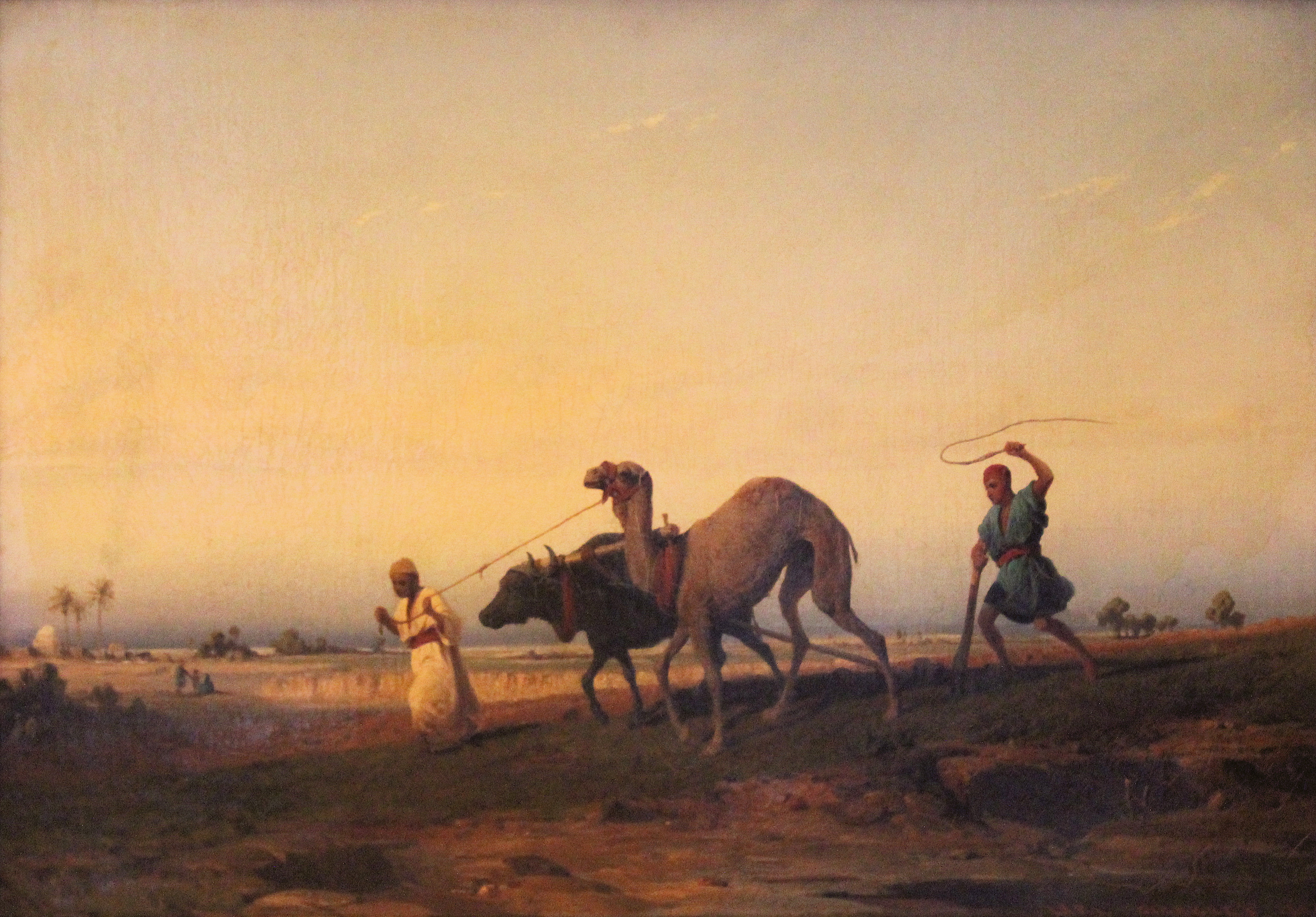
Le Labour en Afrique by Karl Girardet

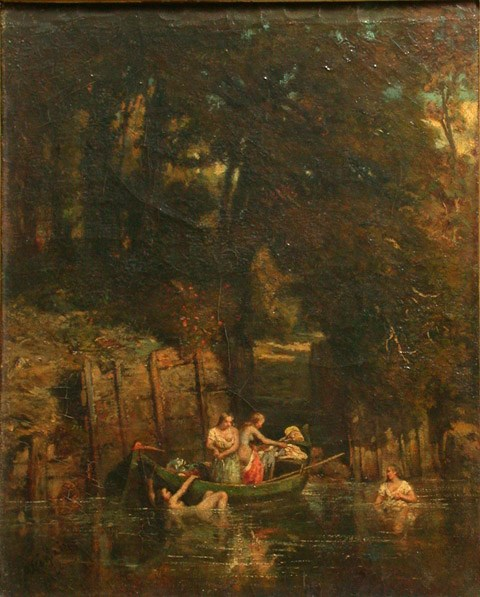
The Bathers: A Souvenir from Charenton by Alexandre-Victor Fontaine

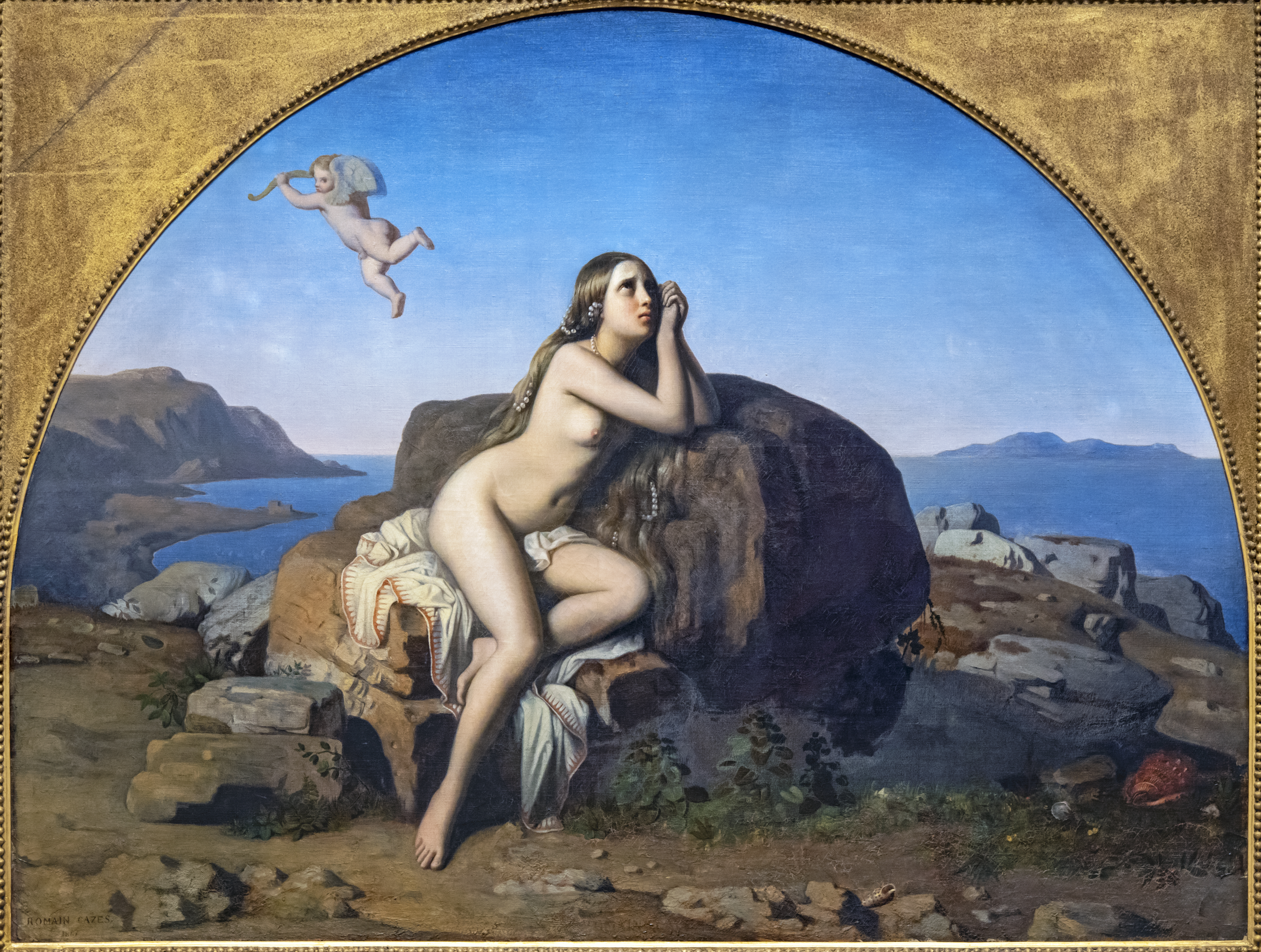
Ariadne Abandoned by Psyche by Romain Cazes.

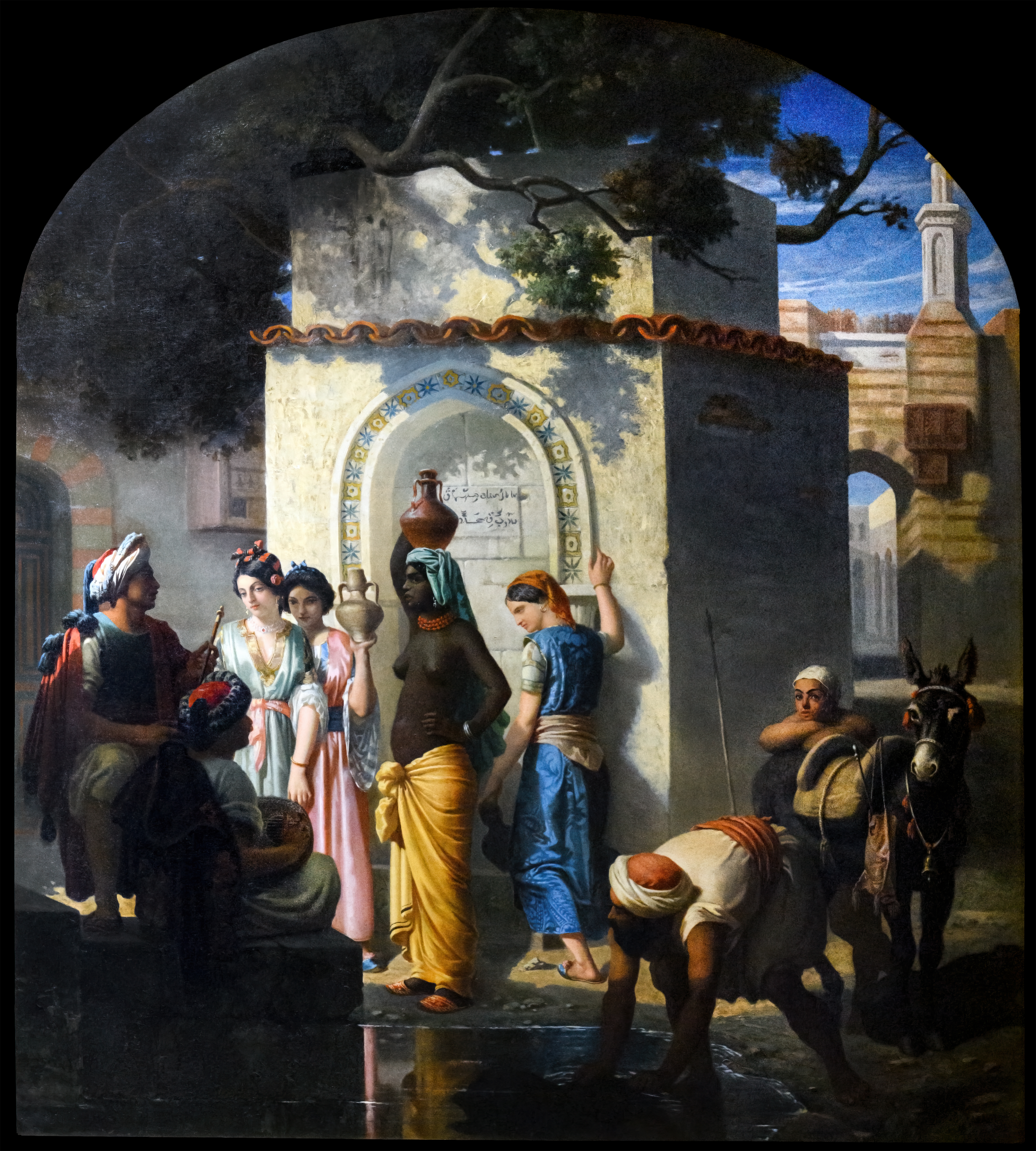
Jewish Women at a Fountain by Charles Gaugiran Nanteuil

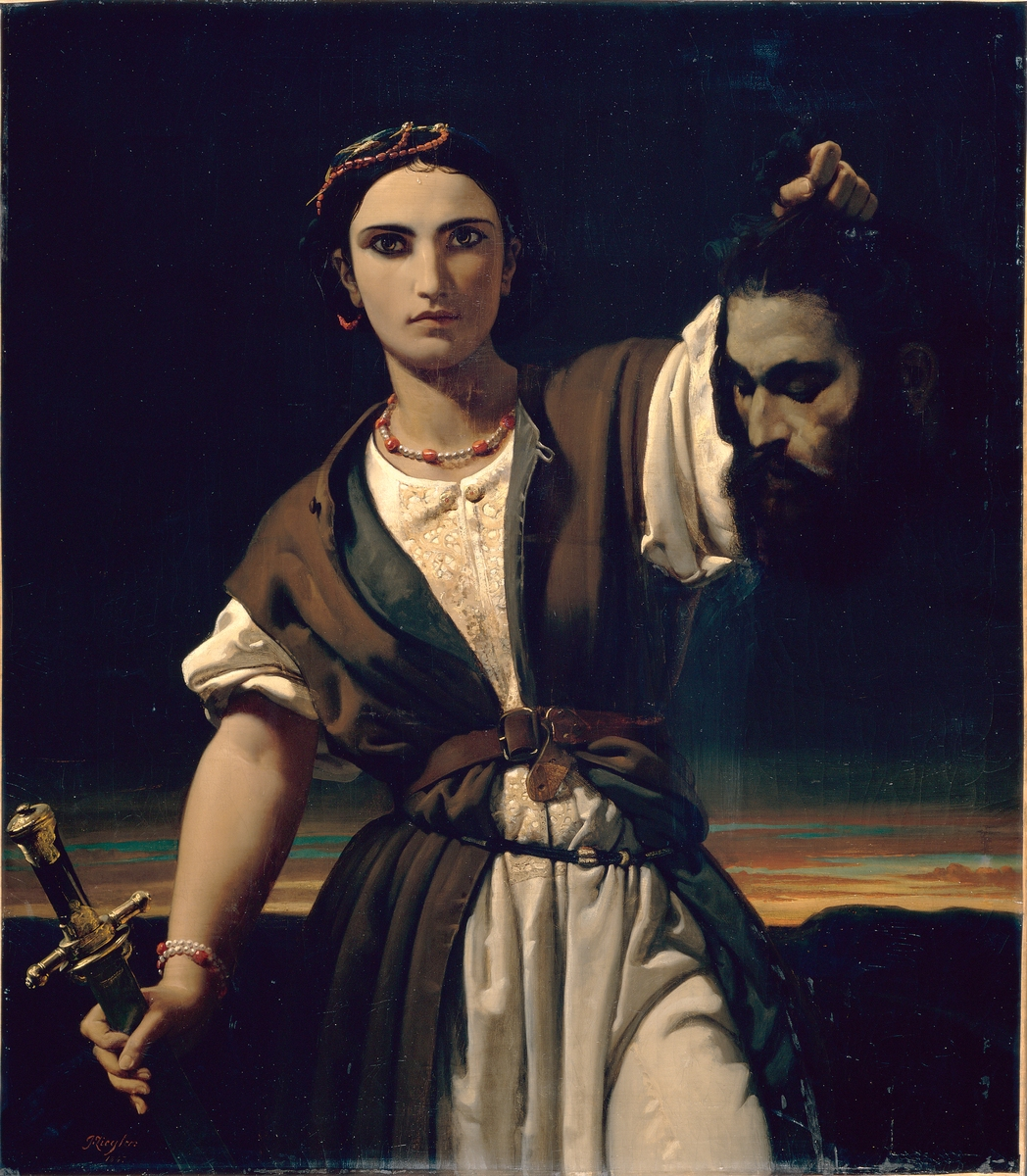
Judith at the Gates of Bethulia by Jules-Claude Ziegler

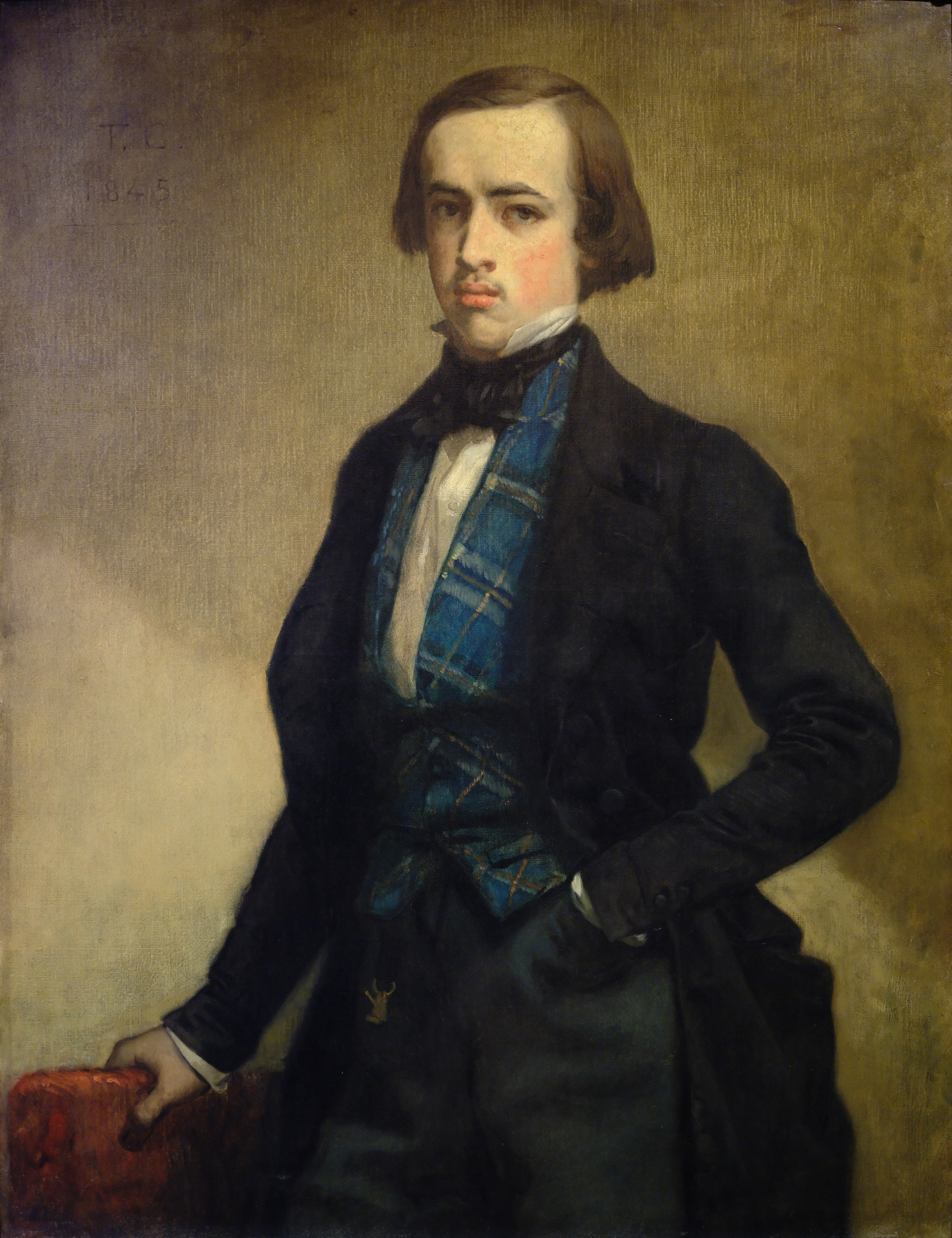
Portrait of Adolphe Moreau by Thomas Couture

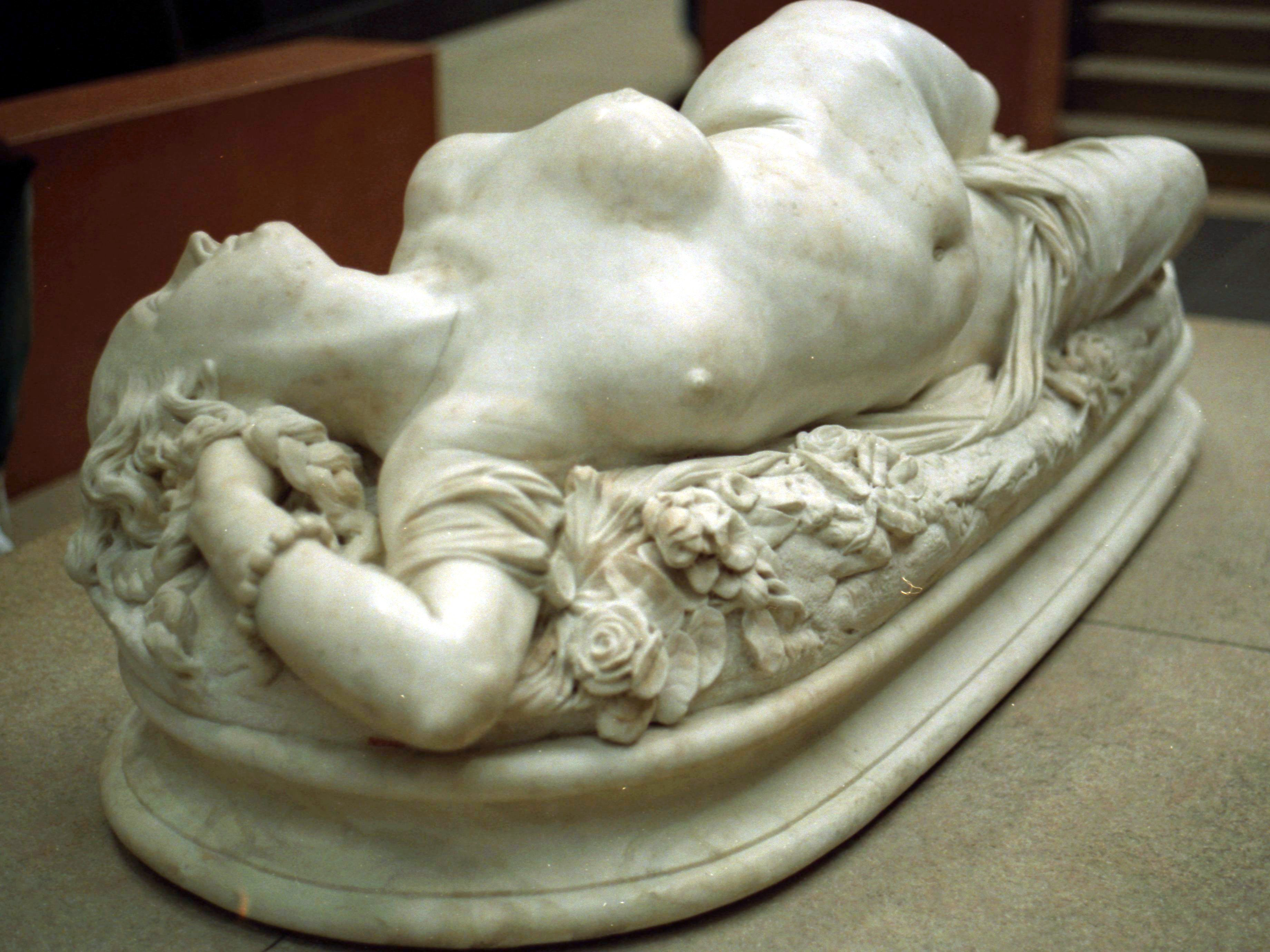
Woman Bitten by a Serpent by Auguste Clésinger

== See also ==
- Royal Academy Exhibition of 1847, a contemporary exhibition held at the National Gallery in London
- Category:Artworks exhibited at the Salon of 1847

== Bibliography ==
- Boime, Albert. Art in an Age of Counterrevolution, 1815-1848. University of Chicago Press, 2004.
- Facos, Michelle. An Introduction to Nineteenth-Century Art. Taylor & Francis, 2011.
