= The Peace of Amiens (painting) =

Painting by Jules-Claude Ziegler

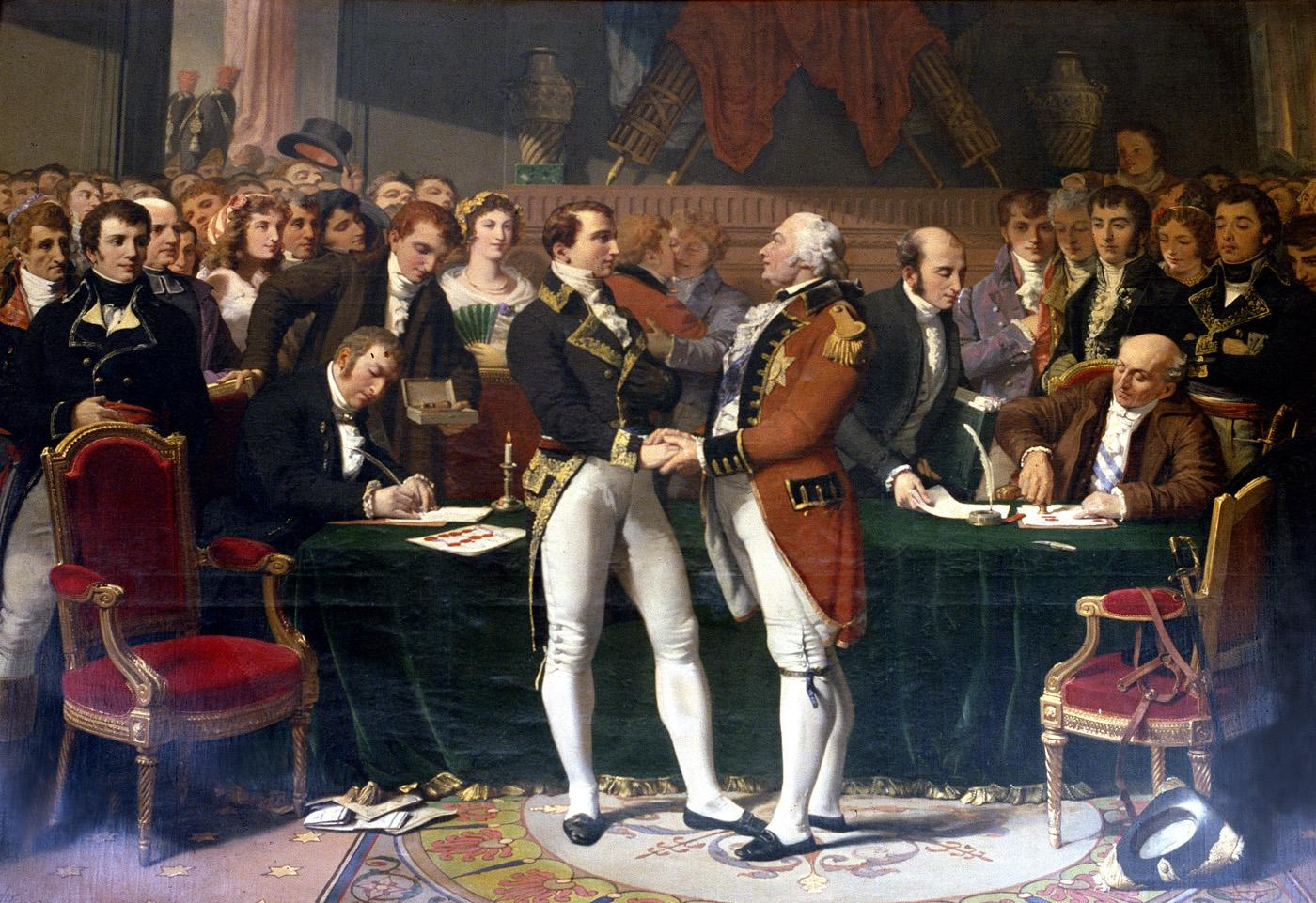
- Artist: Jules-Claude Ziegler
- Year: 1853
- Type: Oil on canvas, history painting
- Dimensions: 280 cm × 400 cm (110 in × 160 in)
- Location: Musée de Picardie, Amiens

The Peace of Amiens (French: La Paix d'Amiens) is an oil on canvas history painting by the French artist Jules-Claude Ziegler, from 1853. It depicts the signing of the Treaty of Amiens on 25 March 1802. It is held in the Musée de Picardie, in Amiens.

== History and description ==
The agreement, negotiated in the French city of Amiens, brought an end to the French Revolutionary Wars, including the war between Britain and France that had begun on 1 February 1793. In the evening the peace was short-lived with the Napoleonic Wars breaking out on 25 May 1803. The painting shows the scene in the Hôtel de Ville, Amiens and depicts the two principal signatories, Joseph Bonaparte, the older brother of First Consul Napoleon, and Lord Cornwallis, acting on behalf of the Addington ministry. The work was painted in early 1853 at a time when Anglo-French relations were improving; the two nations would enter into the Crimean War in October of that year as allies. It was exhibited at the Salon of 1853.

== Bibliography ==
- Crook, Keith. The Imprisoned Traveler: Joseph Forsyth and Napoleon's Italy. Rutgers University Press, 2020.
- Grainger, John D. The Amiens Truce: Britain and Bonaparte, 1801-1803. Boydell Press, 2004.
- Janson, H.W. Paris Salon de 1853. Garland Publishing, 1977.
- Viardot, Louis. The Masterpieces of French Art Illustrated: Being a Biographical History of Art in France, from the Earliest Period to and Including the Salon of 1882. Gebbie, 1883.
