= Musée de l'Histoire de France (Versailles) =

Museum in the Palace of Versailles

Coordinates: 48.8044°N 2.1219°E

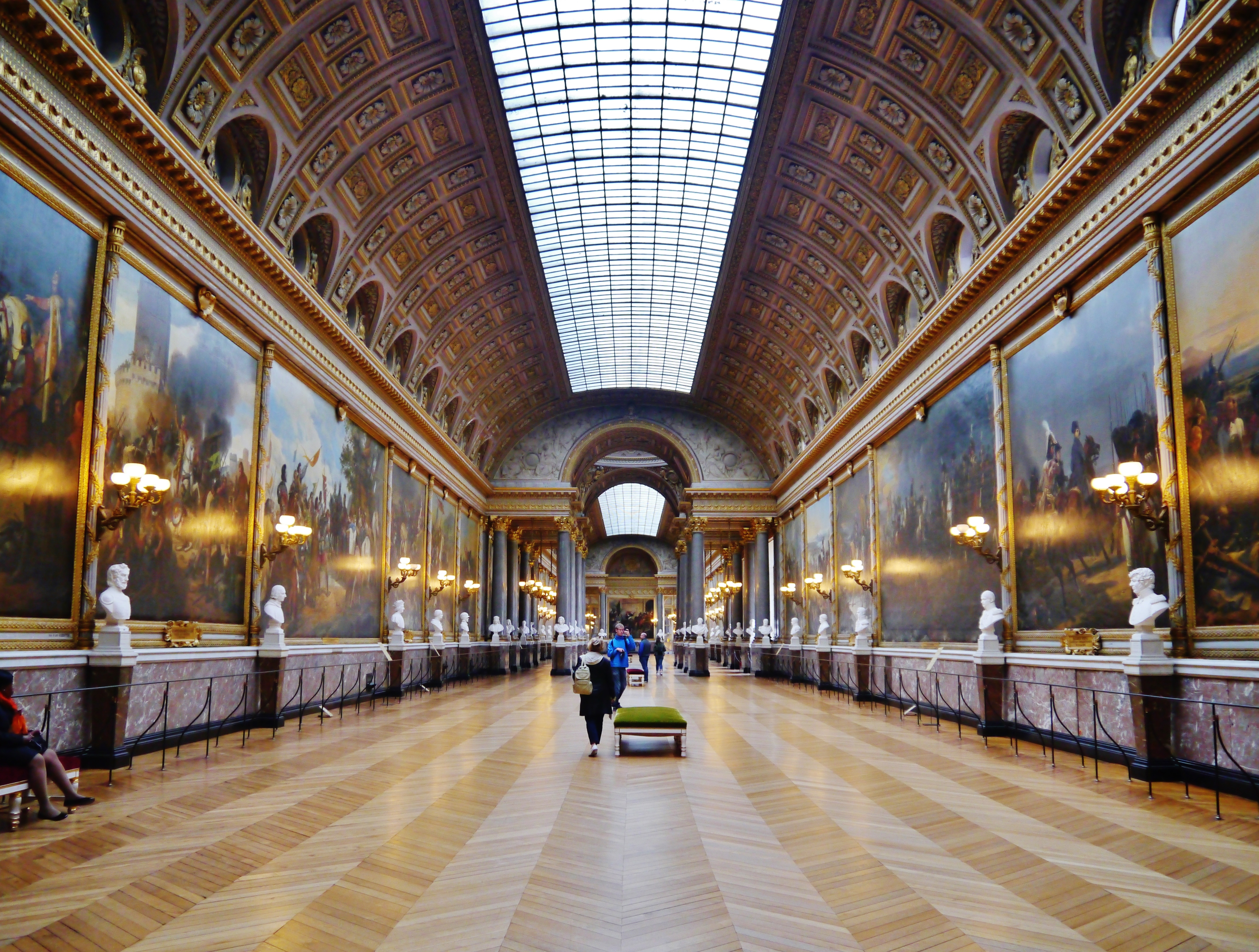
The Galerie des Batailles

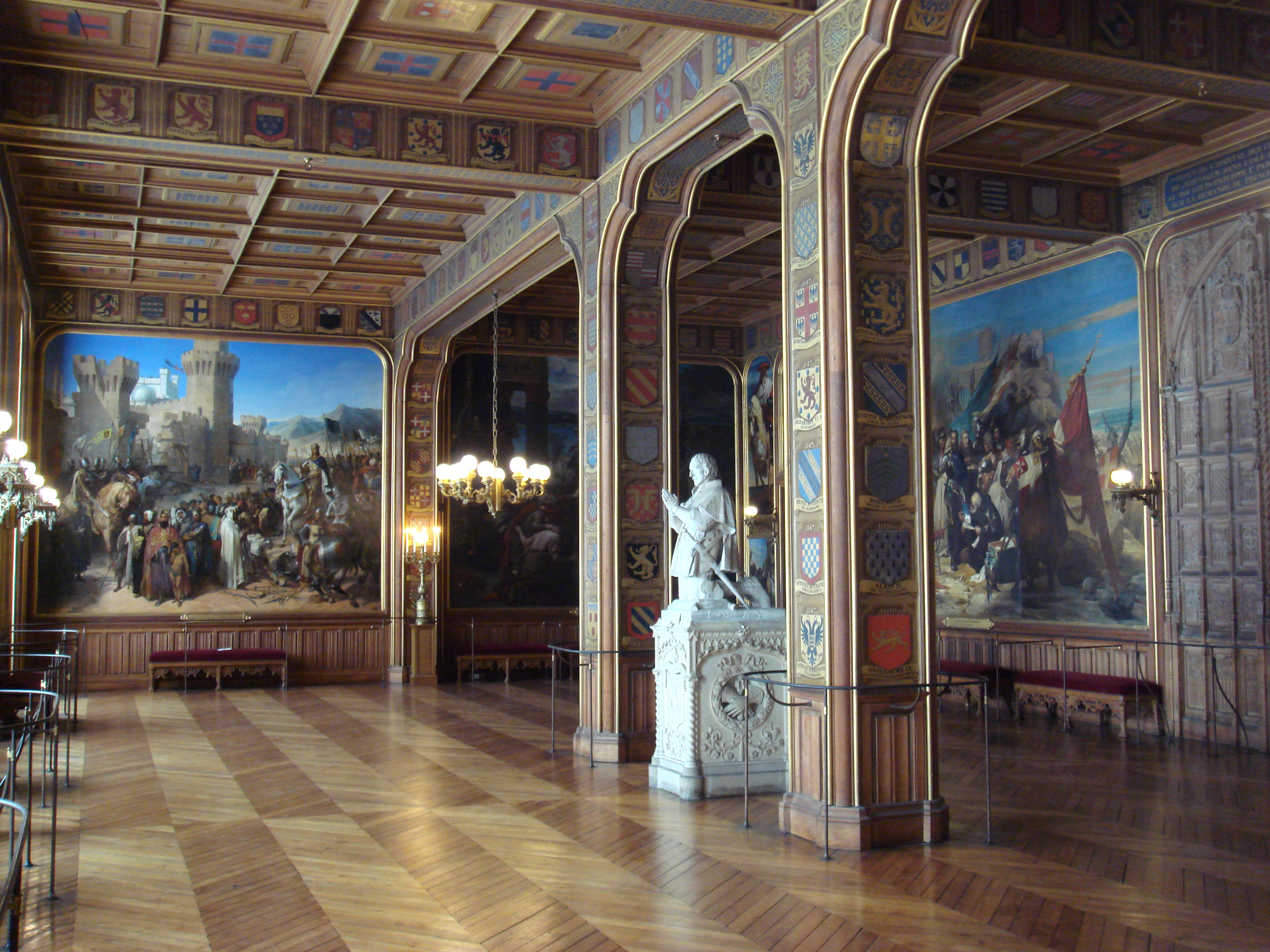
One of the Salles des Croisades

The Musée de l'Histoire de France (French pronunciation: [myze d(ə) listwaʁ də fʁɑ̃s]; lit. 'Museum of the History of France') is a museum which was created by King Louis Philippe I in the Palace of Versailles and opened in 1837. At the time, it represented an ambitious project of national reconciliation between the hitherto competing narratives of the French monarchy and the French Revolution, to which Louis-Philippe devoted significant personal attention. Whereas it gradually faded in importance as a museum in the later 19th century, its lavish historicist decoration remains a major exemplar of the art of France's July Monarchy.

== History ==
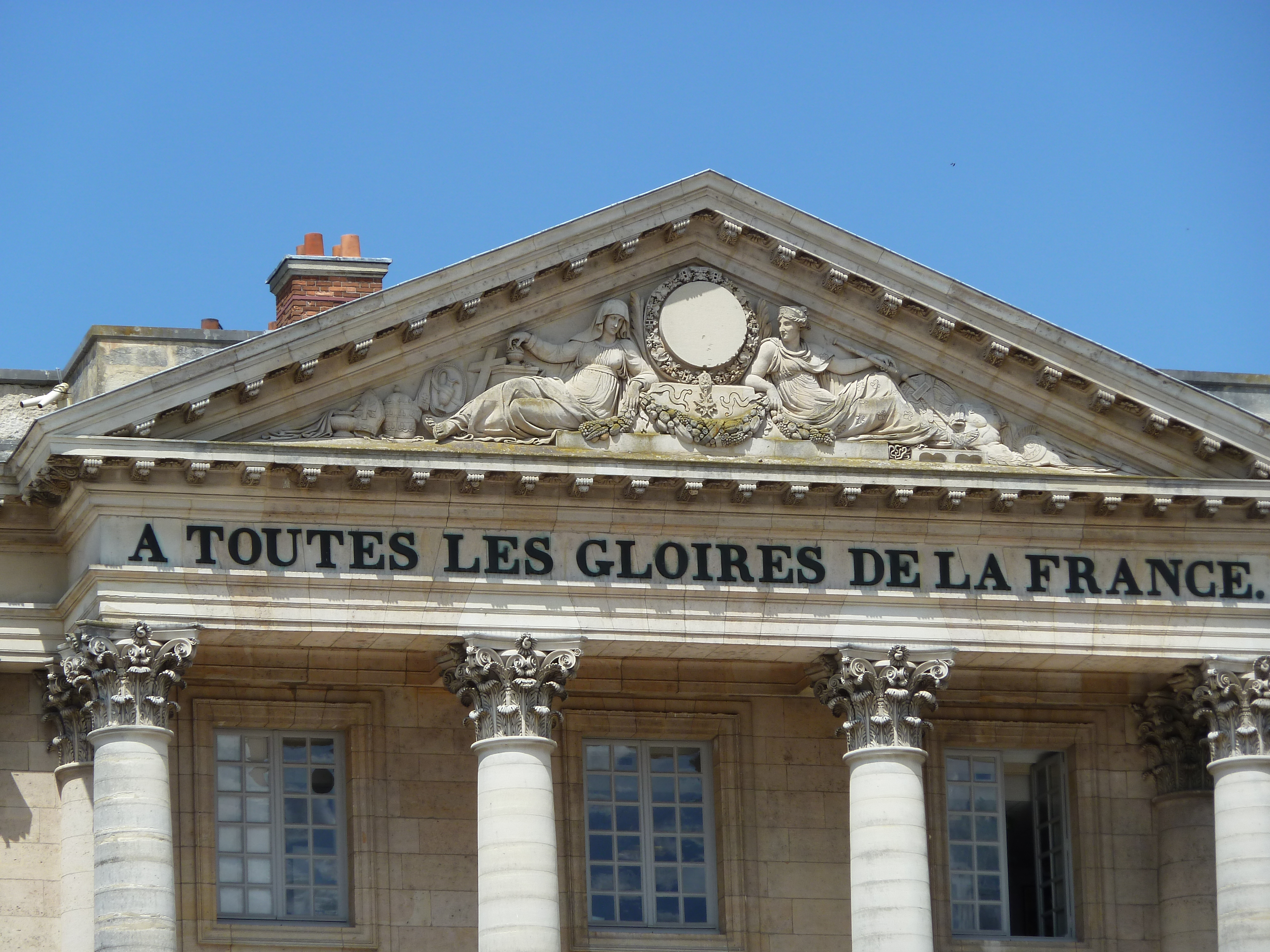
The museum was dedicated "to all France's glories" in a spirit of national reconciliation

When Louis-Philippe became king in 1830 following the July Revolution, the Palace of Versailles had been mostly unoccupied for more than 40 years and had fallen into disrepair. Louis-Philippe, who had a personal interest in history, decided in 1833 to repurpose the massive building for a non-residential use. His minister Marthe Camille Bachasson, Count of Montalivet was instrumental in the development of the museum project.

A number of new rooms and galleries were created by restructuring the palace's interior spaces and destroying a number of pre-existing apartments. The design was coordinated by architect Frédéric Nepveu, with assistance from Pierre Fontaine for the concept of zenithal lighting of the Galerie des Batailles. The museum was inaugurated on 10 June 1837 with a lavish opening ceremony. The museum displayed artefacts formerly in other national collections, especially portraits of past monarchs and other historically significant individuals, as well as works specifically commissioned for it.

Victor Hugo, who attended the inauguration, was appreciative of the project in his personal notes:

What King Louis-Philippe has done in Versailles is good. By completing this work he has been a great king and an impartial philosopher, made a national monument from a monarchical one, put an immense idea in a gigantic edifice; installed the present in the past, 1789 face-to-face with 1688, the Emperor in the royal house, Napoleon in Louis XIV's home; in sum, bound that magnificent book known as French history into this magnificent binding known as Versailles.

— Victor Hugo, Feuilles paginées III

Further work was carried out to expand the museum under the Second French Empire in the 1850s and 1860s and in the early years of the Third Republic. In the late 19th century, however, Versailles curator Pierre de Nolhac put emphasis on the restoration of the pre-revolutionary state of the palace, and dismantled some of the museum's arrangements.

The museum's rooms and collection are now managed by the Public Establishment of the Palace, Museum and National Estate of Versailles together with the rest of the palace and domains. Most of the corresponding galleries and exhibition spaces are not permanently open to the public.

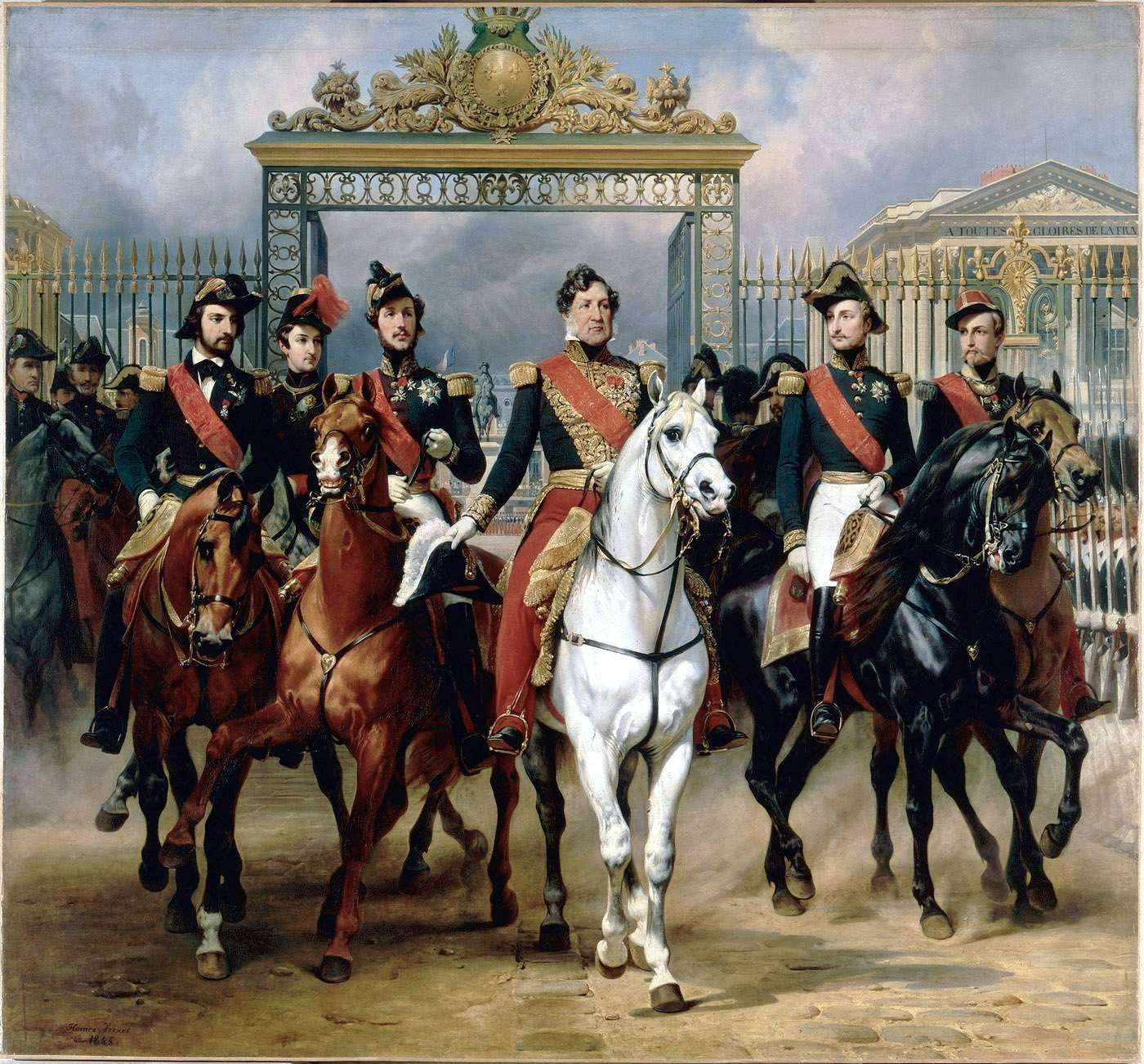
Louis-Philippe and his sons at the inauguration of the Musée de l'Histoire de France on 10 June 1837, by Horace Vernet (1846), Palace of Versailles

== Galleries and collections ==
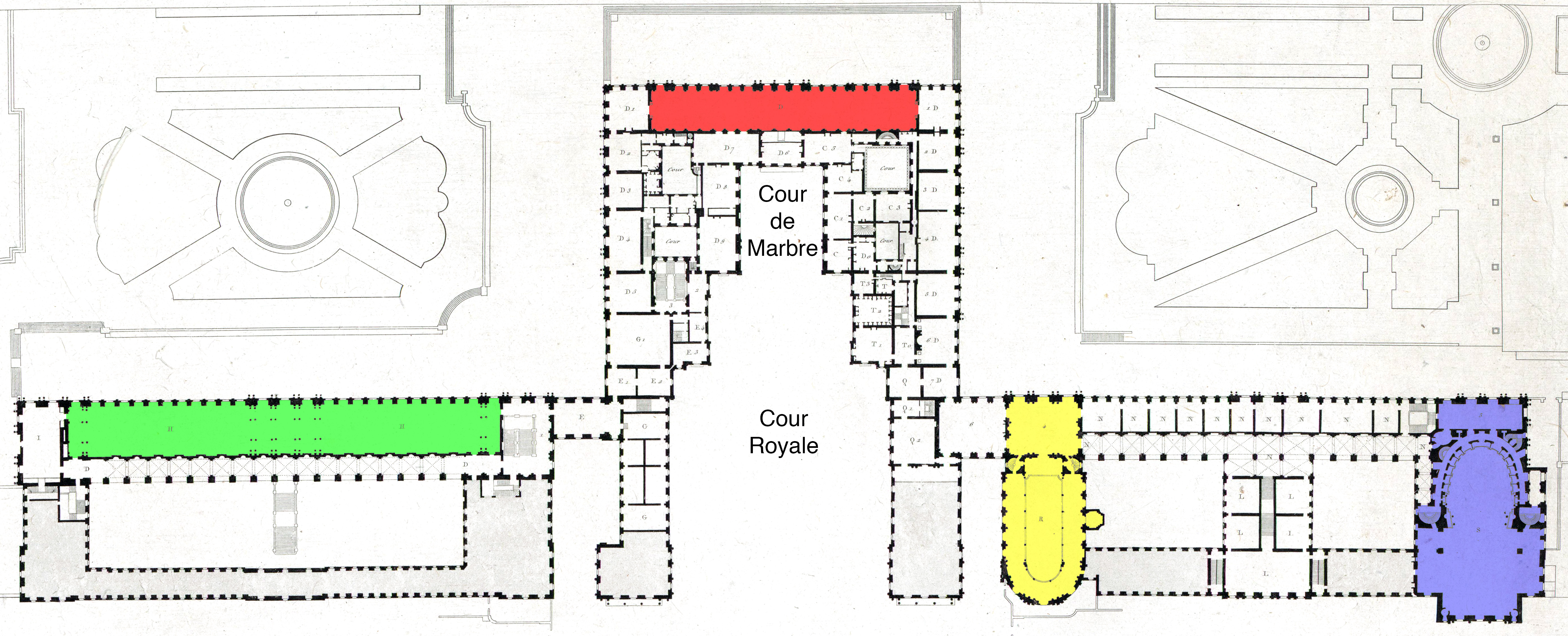
Plan of the Palace's first floor, with the galerie des Batailles highlighted in green. The other highlights are the Hall of Mirrors (red), the Palace Chapel (yellow), and the Royal Opera (blue)

Most of the paintings are kept in the attics of the palace's North and South Wings. These exhibition spaces are complemented by several prestige galleries:

- the monumental galerie des Batailles, occupying most of the South Wing's first floor on the garden (West) side, with 36 large-scale historical paintings and 82 busts of French military leaders who died in battle;
- the five salles des Croisades, opened in 1843 in the middle section of the North Wing's ground floor, celebrating the crusades as a specifically French endeavour (including Eugène Delacroix's Entry of the Crusaders in Constantinople, transferred to the Louvre in 1885 and replaced by a copy);
- the salle de 1792 connecting to the South Wing on the first floor, sole surviving one of several rooms dedicated to the French Revolution;
- the Consulate and Empire Rooms on the South Wing's ground floor below the galerie des Batailles, on Napoleon and his military victories;
- the salle de 1830 to the South of the galerie des Batailles, commemorating the July Revolution;
- the galleries of Africa, Crimea and Italy on the North Wing's first floor above the salles des Croisades, glorifying the French involvement under Louis-Philippe in the conquest of Algeria, the siege of Antwerp (1832) and the "Pastry War" with Mexico, as well as the later Second Empire's campaigns in the Crimean War and the Second Italian War of Independence;
- the galeries de pierre, four long corridors (on the ground floor and first floor, in the palace's North and South wings) decorated with numerous sculptures of French historical figures.

With over 6,000 paintings and 3,000 sculptures, the museum's collections are the premier source of iconography on French history.

== See also ==
- Musée des Souverains
