= Judith at the Gates of Bethulia =

Painting by Jules-Claude Ziegler

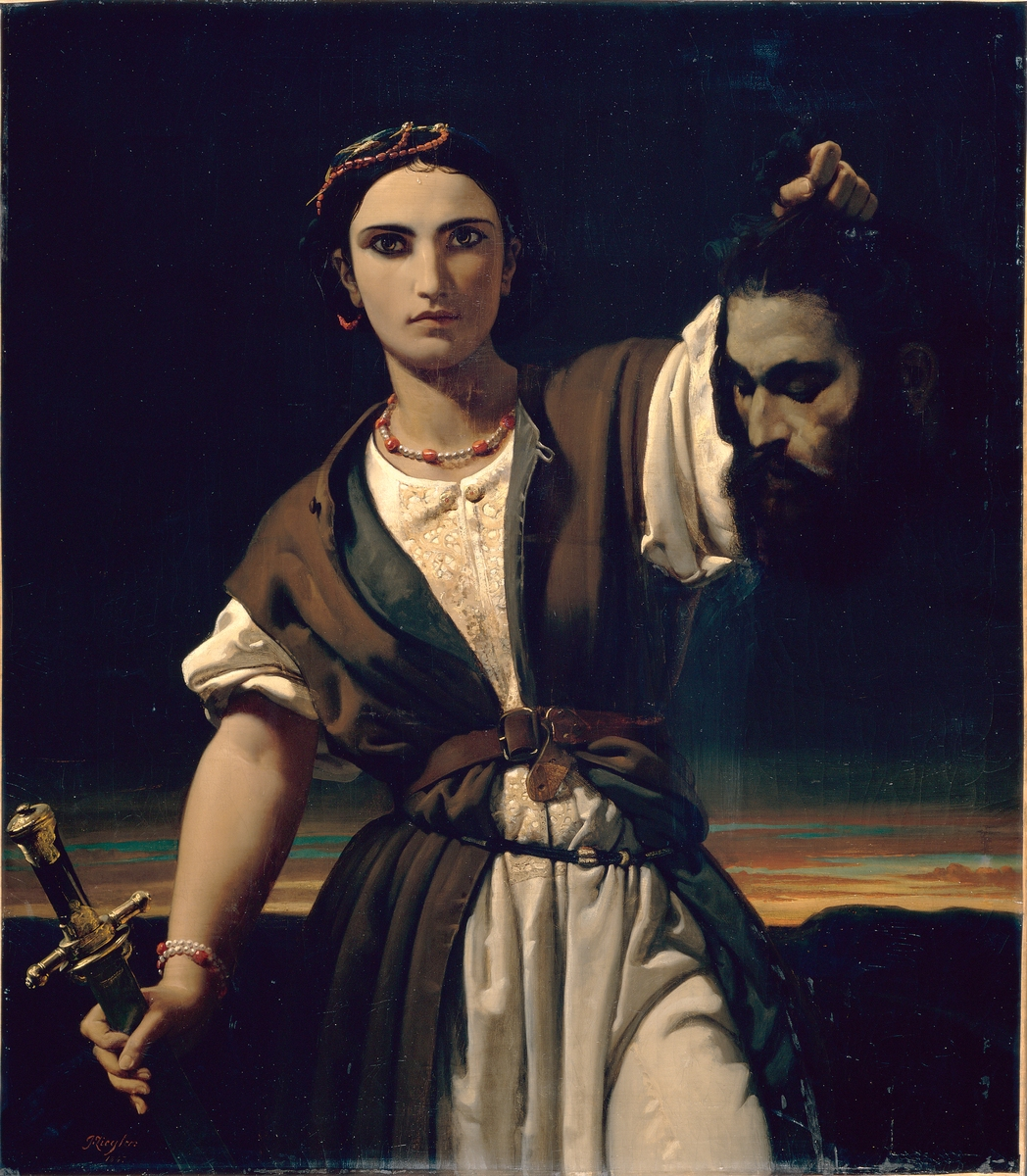
Judith at the Gates of Bethulia (1847) by Jules-Claude Ziegler

Judith at the Gates of Bethulia is an 1847 painting by French artist Jules-Claude Ziegler, now in the Museum of Fine Arts of Lyon. It shows Judith holding the head of Holofernes. The painting was displayed at the Salon of 1847 at the Louvre.
