= Louis Philippe and His Sons =

Painting by Horace Vernet

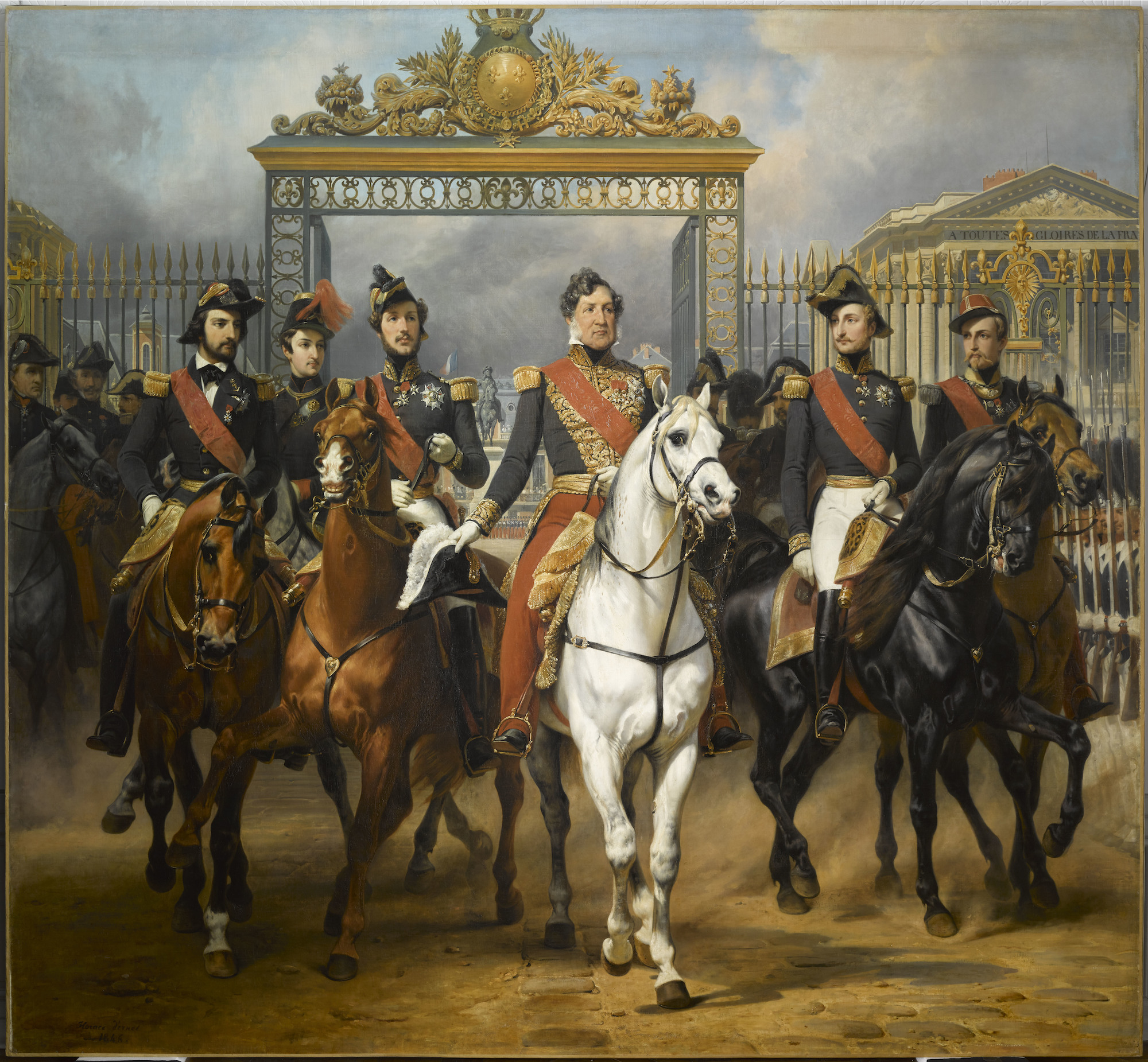
- Artist: Horace Vernet
- Year: 1846
- Type: Oil on canvas, history painting
- Dimensions: 368 cm × 397.5 cm (145 in × 156.5 in)
- Location: Palace of Versailles, Versailles

Louis-Philippe and His Sons Riding Out from Versailles is an 1846 oil-on-canvas painting by the French artist Horace Vernet.

== History and description ==
It features a group portrait of Louis Philippe I and his sons riding out from the Palace of Versailles. Versailles, once the residence of the House of Bourbon during the Ancien régime before the French Revolution, had been abandoned for several decades. During the July Monarchy Louis Philippe oversaw its restoration as a national museum. Vernet's painting commemorates its inauguration on 10 June 1837. The king rides out through the gates accompanied by his five sons the Duke of Orléans, the Duke of Nemours, the Prince of Joinville, the Duke of Aumale and the Duke of Montpensier. Orléans, the king's eldest son and heir, had subsequently died in a carriage accident in 1842.

It was exhibited at the Salon of 1847. The painting was commissioned by the king to hang in Versailles, where it remains. Vernet received 25,000 francs for producing the work. Two years later Louis Philipe was overthrown by the French Revolution of 1848.

== Bibliography ==
- Boime, Albert. A Social History of Modern Art, Volume 3: Art in Age of Counterrevolution. University of Chicago Press, 2004.
- Harkett, Daniel & Hornstein, Katie (ed.) Horace Vernet and the Thresholds of Nineteenth-Century Visual Culture. Dartmouth College Press, 2017.
- Müller, Frank Lorenz Royal Heirs: Succession and the Future of Monarchy in Nineteenth-Century Europe. Cambridge University Press, 2023
- Price, Munro. The Perilous Crown: France Between Revolutions, 1814-1848. Pan Macmillan, 2010.
- Tinterow, Gary & Lacambre, Geneviève. Manet/Velázquez: The French Taste for Spanish Painting. Metropolitan Museum of Art, 2003.
