= Hôtel de Ville, Amiens =

Town hall in Amiens, France

Hôtel de Ville
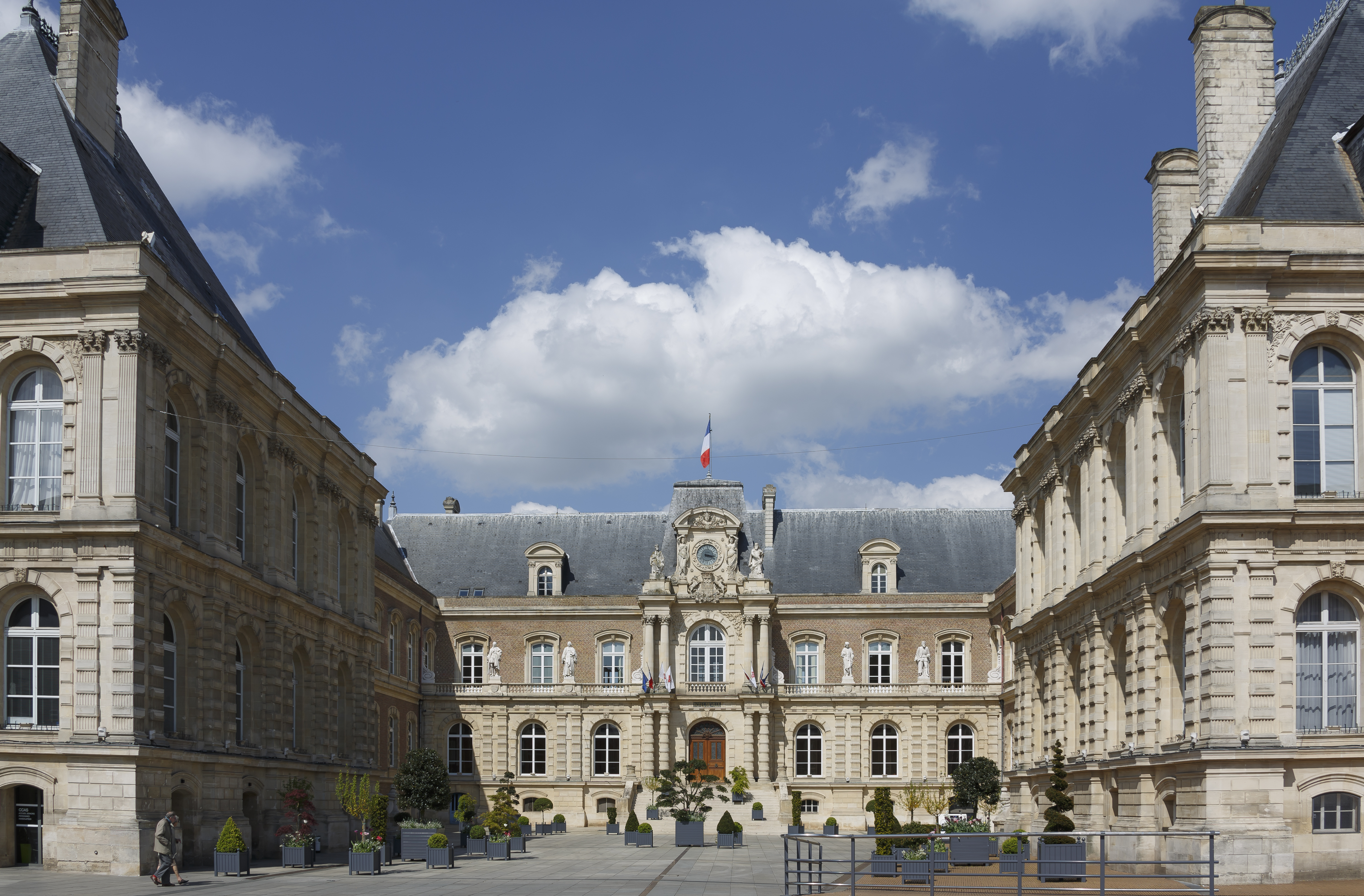
- The main frontage of the Hôtel de Ville in April 2014
- Interactive map of the Hôtel de Ville area

General information
- Type: City hall
- Architectural style: Neoclassical style
- Location: Amiens, France
- Coordinates: 49.8941°N 2.2957°E
- Completed: 1760

Design and construction
- Architects: Pierre-Louis Beffara and Jean-Jacques Jumel-Riquier

The Hôtel de Ville (French pronunciation: [otɛl də vil], City Hall; in Picard: Heutel ed ville) is a municipal building in Amiens, Somme, northern France, standing on the Place de l'Hôtel de Ville. It has been included on the Inventaire général des monuments by the French Ministry of Culture since 1998.

== History ==
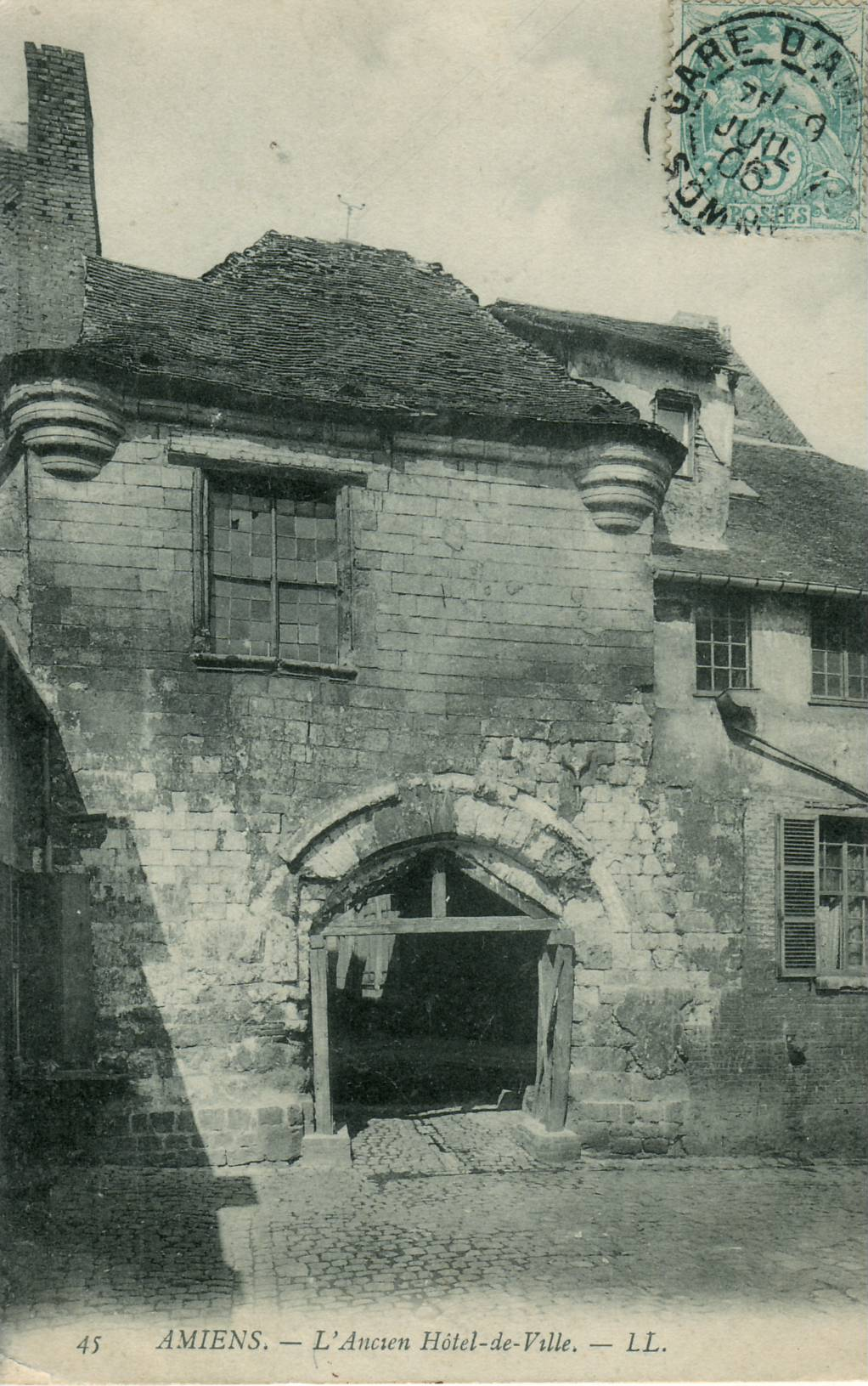
The ancient town hall

An ancient town hall, referred to as La Malmaison, was in existence on the current site, which was occupied amphitheatre in Roman times, in the 13th century. The local council relocated to the Hôtel des Cloquiers, which was at the corner of the Place Saint-Martin and Rue des Sergents, in 1316. After finding this arrangement inadequate, the council decided to commission a purpose-built town hall. The site they selected was close to the market hall. Construction started in 1550. It was designed in the neoclassical style, built in brick and stone but, because of the intervention of the French Wars of Religion, it was not completed until around 1600. The ground floor was arcaded and the first floor was fenestrated by cross-windows flanked by Ionic order pilasters supporting the roof.

During the siege of Amiens in summer 1597, the Spanish general, Hernán Tello de Portocarrero, used the partly-built town hall as his headquarters. After recovering control of the city later that year, Henry IV received his citizens in the Grand Salle (Great Hall) of the same building. Louis XIII attended a banquet in his honour in the town hall in December 1620 and Henrietta Maria, the future Queen of Great Britain, attended a function there in May 1625.

In the mid-18th century, the council decided to commission a new town hall. The site they selected was again adjacent to Rue de la Malmaison i.e. close to the ancient town hall. The new building was designed by Pierre-Louis Beffara and Jean-Jacques Jumel-Riquier in the neoclassical style, built in stone and was completed in 1760. The building initially consisted of just one block, the northern block of the current complex. The central bay featured a round headed doorway flanked by pairs of banded Doric order columns, and a round headed French door flanked by pairs of Corinthian order columns on the first floor. The central bay was surmounted by a pediment containing a clock. The other bays were fenestrated by round headed windows on the ground floor and by segmental headed windows on the first floor. Internally, the principal rooms included the Salle du Congrès (council chamber).

The building contained a fine sculpture, depicting the Virgin Mary, created by Nicolas Blasset in the mid-17th century. During the French Revolution, this statue was converted into a depiction of Liberté by the sculptor, Julie Charpentier.

The town hall was the venue for the signing, in March 1802, of the Treaty of Amiens which brought a temporary end to the war between France, Spain and the United Kingdom. A painting depicting the event was created by Jules-Claude Ziegler and installed in the Salle du Congrès in 1853. The building was extended to create a courtyard in the second half of the 19th century: the west wing was completed to a design by Louis Victor Amédée Vigreux in 1859 and the east wing was completed to a design by Louis Leullier in 1880.

In the late 19th century, four statues, representing the aldermen who resisted the Spanish soldiers during siege of Amiens in summer 1597, were installed on a gallery above the ground floor windows. Another two statues created by the sculptor, Athanase Fossé, were installed on either side of the clock: they depicted the founders of the commune: Bishop Godfrey of Amiens and Louis VI.

In April 1918, during the German spring offensive of the First World War, the east wing was badly damaged by German shelling. Repairs were completed after the war. Following the liberation of Amiens by troops of the British Second Army, commanded by Lieutenant General Miles Dempsey, on 31 August 1944, during the Second World War, the French tricolour flag was once again hoisted on the flagpole above the town hall. As part of a project to pedestrianise the Place de l'Hôtel de Ville, the cast iron gates were removed and re-erected at the Parc de La Hotoie in 1992.

== Sources ==
- Goze, Antoine; Dusevel, François Hyacinthe G. (1847). Nouvelle description de la cathédrale d'Amiens. Suivie des descriptions du beffroi et de l'hôtel de ville. Alfred Caron. p. 4.
