= Jules-Claude Ziegler =

French artist (1804–1856)

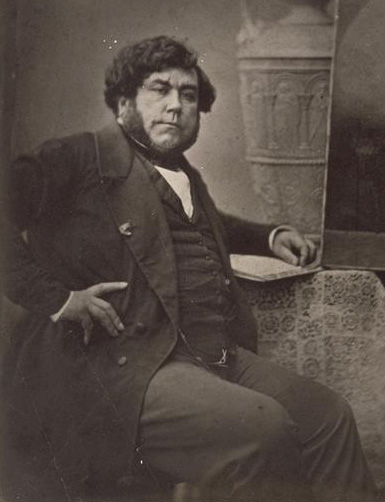
Jules-Claude Ziegler by Nadar

Jules-Claude Ziegler (1804-1856) was a French painter, ceramicist and photographer of the French school.

Ziegler was born in 1804 in Langres, Haute-Marne. He was appointed knight of the Légion d'Honneur in 1825. He was the pupil of Dominique Ingres and began to participate exhibitions at the Salon in 1832.

The half-dome above the altar in the Église de la Madeleine is frescoed by Jules-Claude Ziegler.

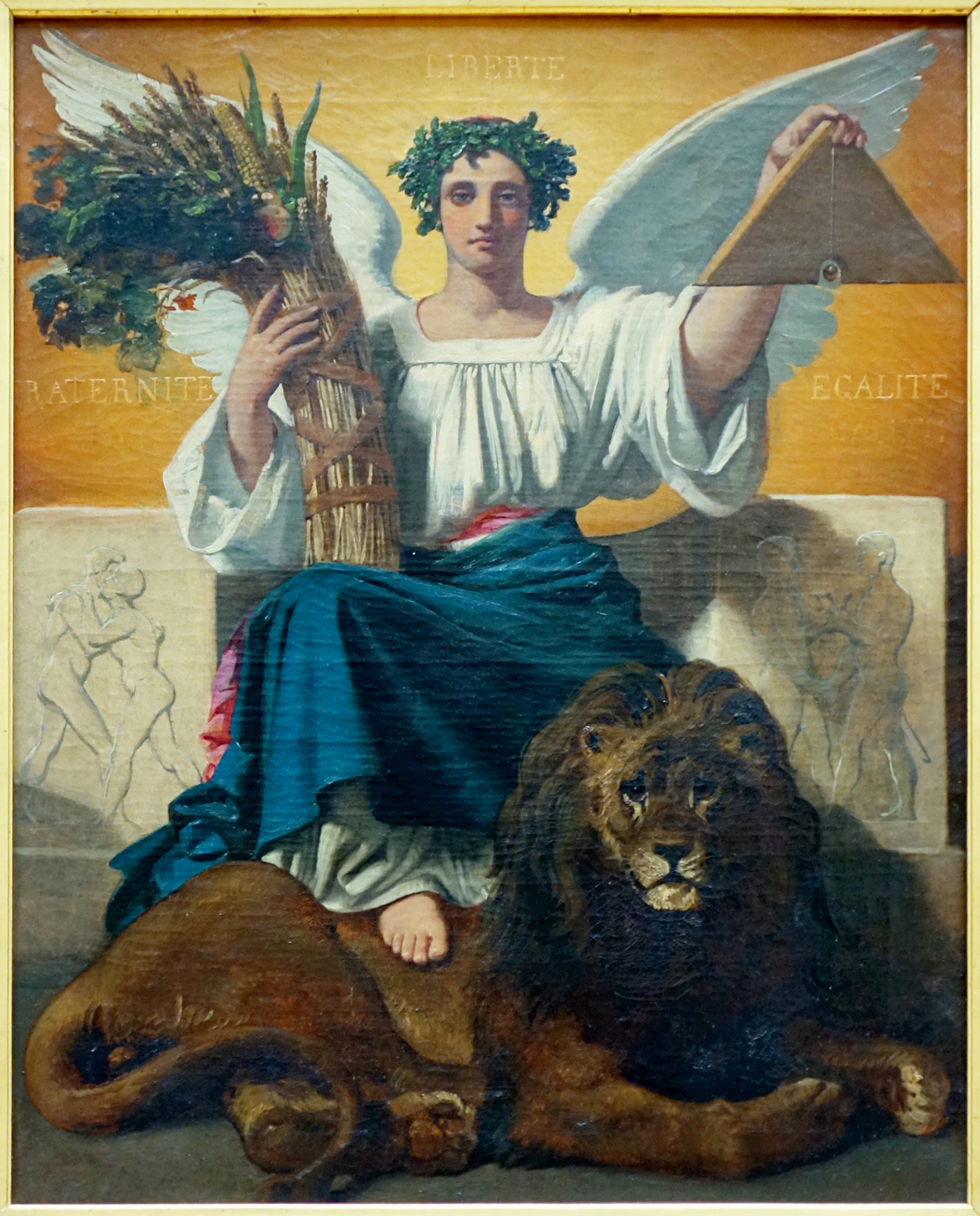
La République (1848), musée des Beaux-Arts de Lille

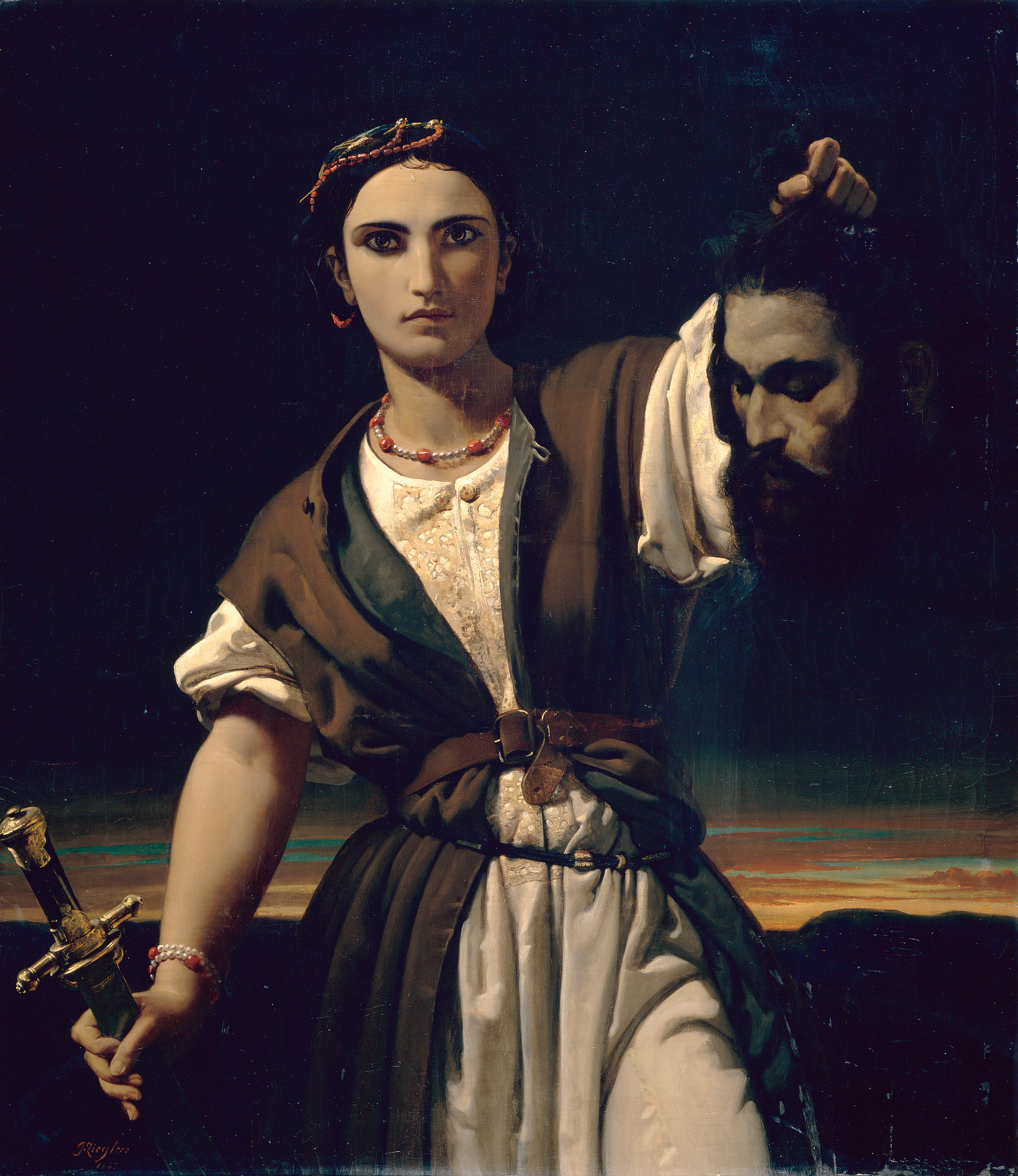
Judith aux portes de Béthulie

== Works ==
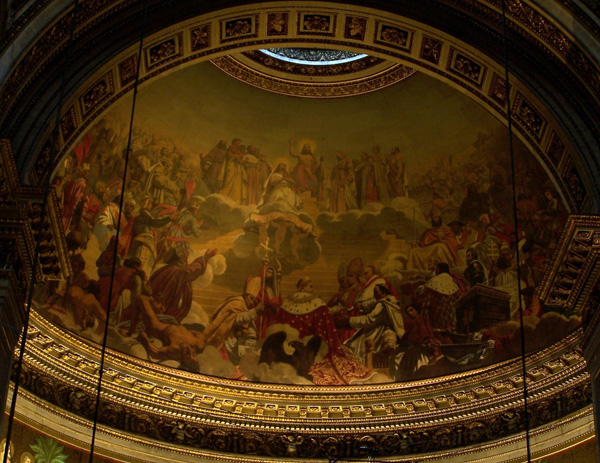
Half-dome in the Église de la Madeleine

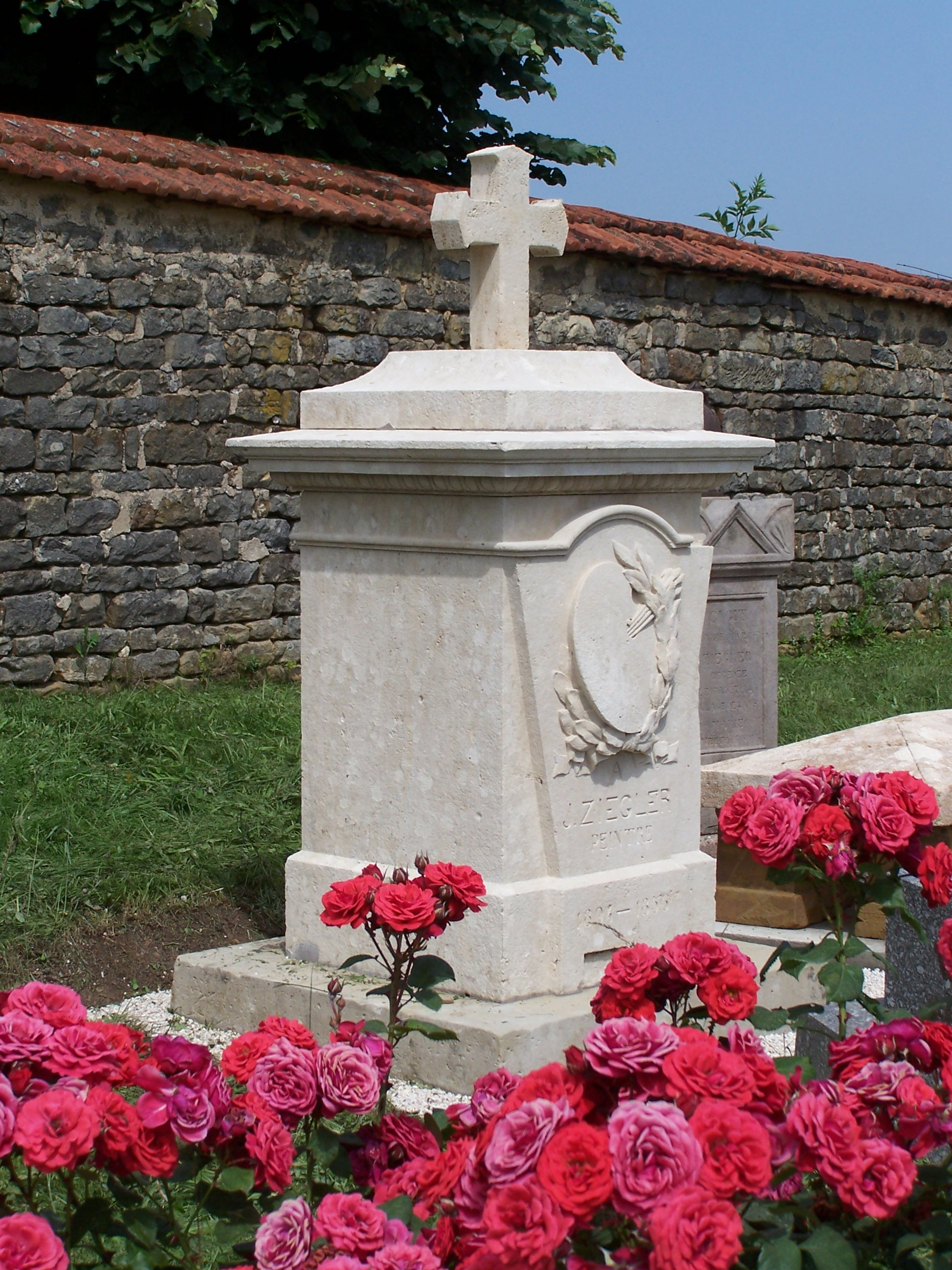
Tomb of Jules-Claude Ziegler, in the cemetery of Soyers

- Vue de Venise la nuit (1832) bought by Louis-Philippe Ier
- Venise vue de nuit (1833), sketch, musée des Beaux-Arts de Nantes
- Portrait of the Cardinal Montalte (1833)
- Le Doge Foscari rentrant dans son palais après son abdication (1833), Arras, museum
- Giotto chez Cimabue (1833), musée des Beaux-Arts de Bordeaux
- Saint Matthieu (1834), Condom Cathedral
- Saint Georges terrassant le dragon (1834), Saint-Omer, église Notre-Dame, a replica at the musée des Beaux-Arts de Nancy
- Louis de Champagne, comte de Sancerre, Maréchal de France en 1368, Connétable en 1397 (1835) - Château de Versailles
- Maréchal Kellerman (1835), Paris, Sénat
- Le prophète Daniel dans la fosse aux lions (1838), Musée de Nantes (a replica in Langres)
- L'Histoire du Christianisme (1836-1838), église de la Madeleine, Paris
- Saint Luc peignant la Vierge (1839), museum of Dunkerque, a copy at the Musée Magnin of Dijon
- L'Imagination (1839), Langres, museum (esquisse au Haggerty Museum of art, Marquette University, Milwaukee)
- Le Bon Pasteur (1839), Montpellier, musée Fabre
- La foi (stained glass), (1839) Eu, church
- Autoportrait
- Paysage d'hiver, Haute-Marne, personal collection
- Notre-Dame des Neiges (1844), museum of Bourbonne-les-Bains
- La Rosée répandant ses perles sur les fleurs (1844), Museum of Langres
- Femme à sa toilette, une Vénitienne, (1844), châteaux de Malmaison et Bois-Préau
- Judith aux portes de Béthulie (1847), musée des beaux-arts de Lyon
- Le Songe de Jacob (1847)
- La République (1848), musée des Beaux-Arts de Lille
- Les Pasteurs de la Bible, (1850) museum de Dijon
- Pluie d'été, 1850, museum of Saint-Dizier
- Charles Quint, devenu moine, renvoyant son portrait avec les insignes de l'empire, à Londres
- Henri II et Diane de Poitiers
- Agnès Sorel et Charles VII
- Le Cardinal Gighi faisant des excuses à Louis XIV, museum of Versailles (1834)
- Le Rosaire: Saint Dominique et Sainte Catherine, church of Ouge
- La Paix d'Amiens (1853), Amiens, Tribunal
- Portrait of Marquis de Coislin
- La Vierge de Bourgogne, museum of Langres
- Immaculée conception (1856), not finished, Museum of Langres

== Gallery ==
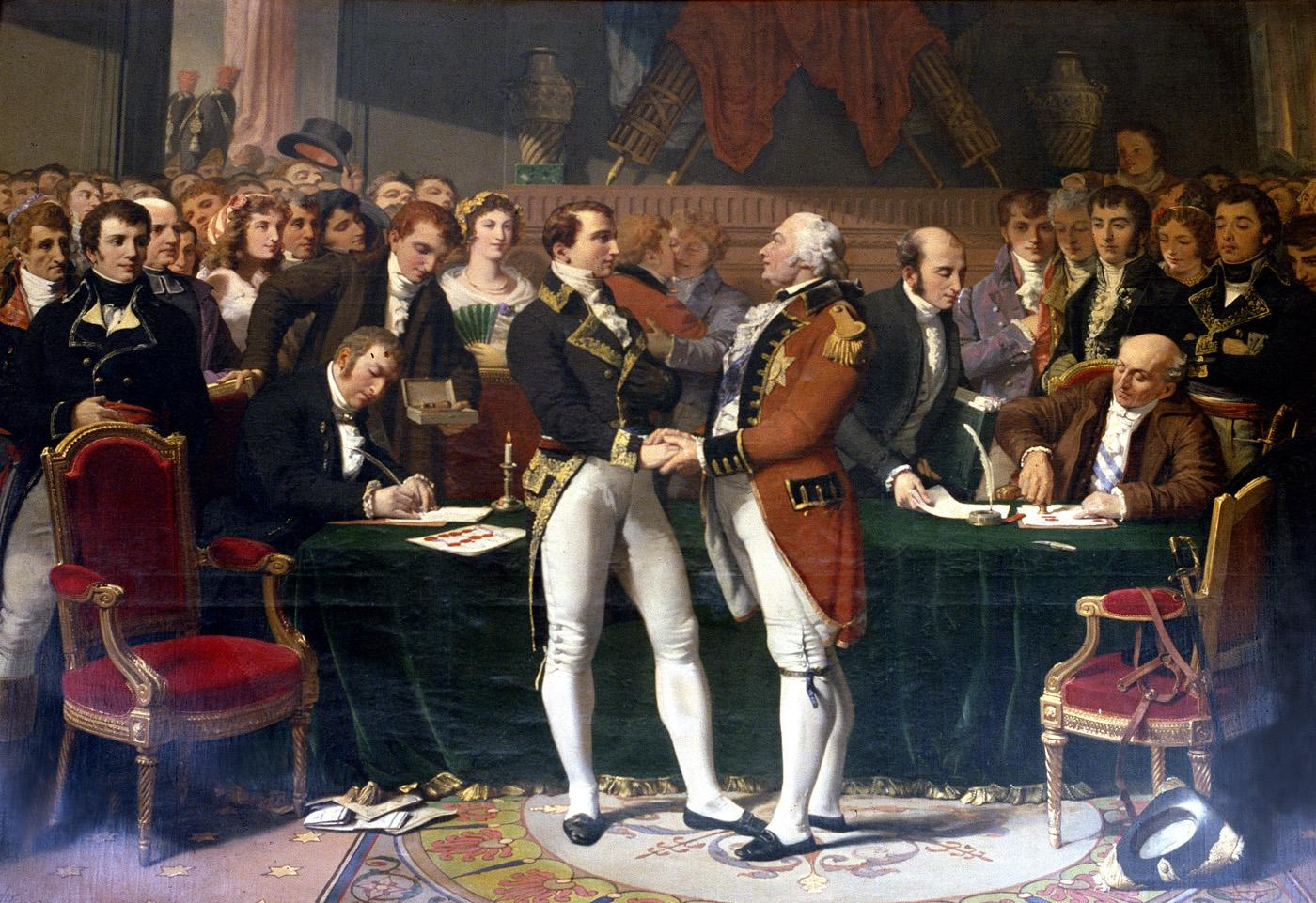
The Peace of Amiens, 1853
