= Gustave Courbet =

French realist painter (1819–1877)

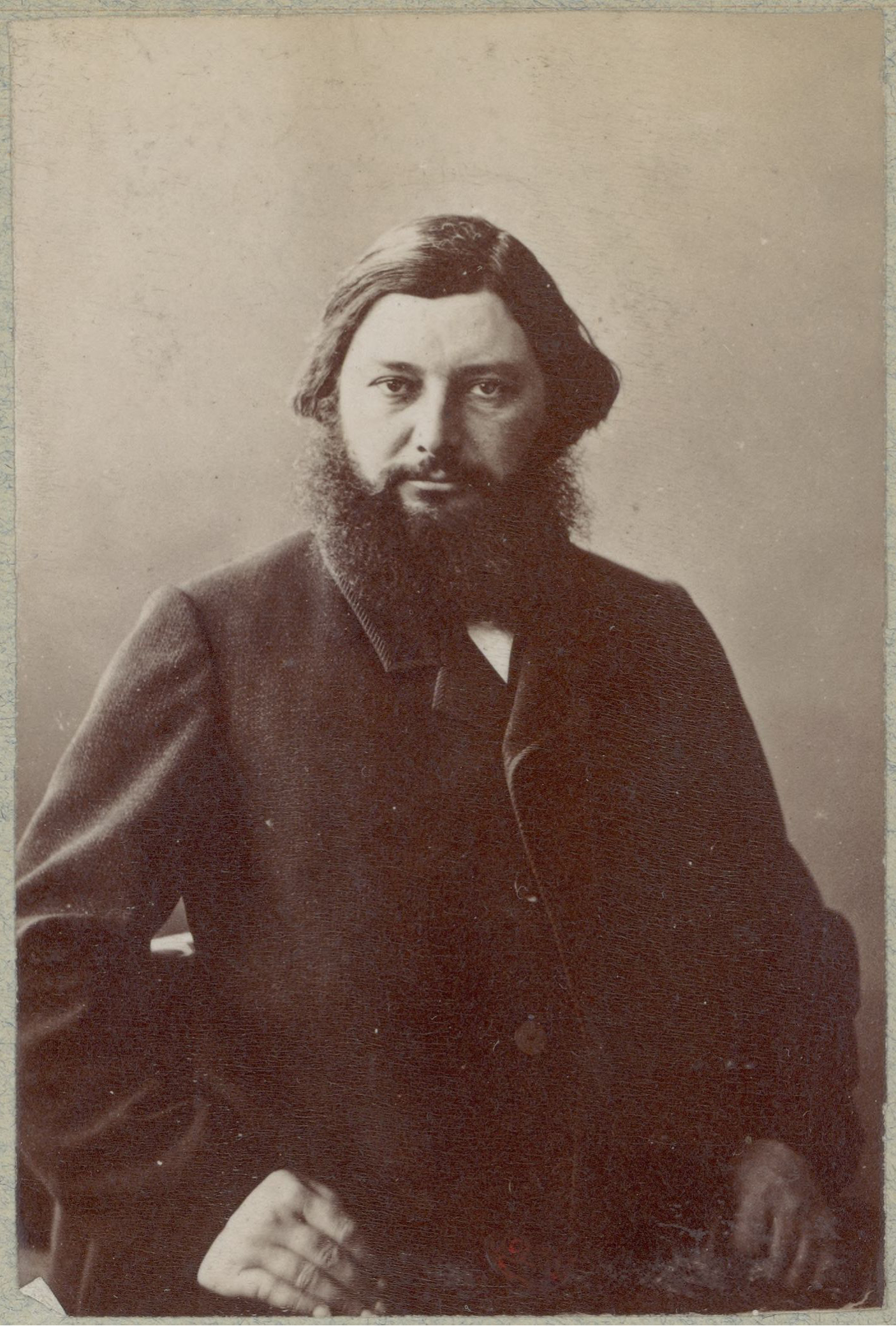
- Portrait photograph by Nadar, c. 1860s
- Born: Jean Désiré Gustave Courbet; 10 June 1819; Ornans, Doubs, France
- Died: 31 December 1877 (aged 58); La Tour-de-Peilz, Switzerland
- Known for: Painting; sculpting
- Notable work: The Stone Breakers (1849); A Burial at Ornans (1849–1850); The Painter's Studio (1855); L'Origine du monde (1866); Le Sommeil (1866)
- Movement: Realism
- Awards: Gold-Medal winner, Salon of 1848; Nominated to receive the French Legion of Honor in 1870 (refused)
- Patrons: Alfred Bruyas

Jean Désiré Gustave Courbet (UK: /ˈkʊərbeɪ/ KOOR-bay; US: /kʊərˈbeɪ/ koor-BAY; French: [ɡystav kuʁbɛ]; 10 June 1819 – 31 December 1877) was a French painter who led the Realism movement in 19th-century French painting. Committed to painting only what he could see, he rejected academic convention and the Romanticism of the previous generation of visual artists. His independence set an example that was important to later artists, such as the Impressionists and the Cubists. Courbet occupies an important place in 19th-century French painting as an innovator and as an artist willing to make bold social statements through his work.

Courbet's paintings of the late 1840s and early 1850s brought him his first recognition. They challenged convention by depicting unidealized peasants and workers, often on a grand scale traditionally reserved for paintings of religious or historical subjects. Courbet's subsequent paintings were mostly of a less overtly political character: landscapes, seascapes, hunting scenes, nudes, and still lifes. Courbet was imprisoned for six months in 1871 for his involvement with the Paris Commune and lived in exile in Switzerland from 1873 until his death four years later.

== Biography ==
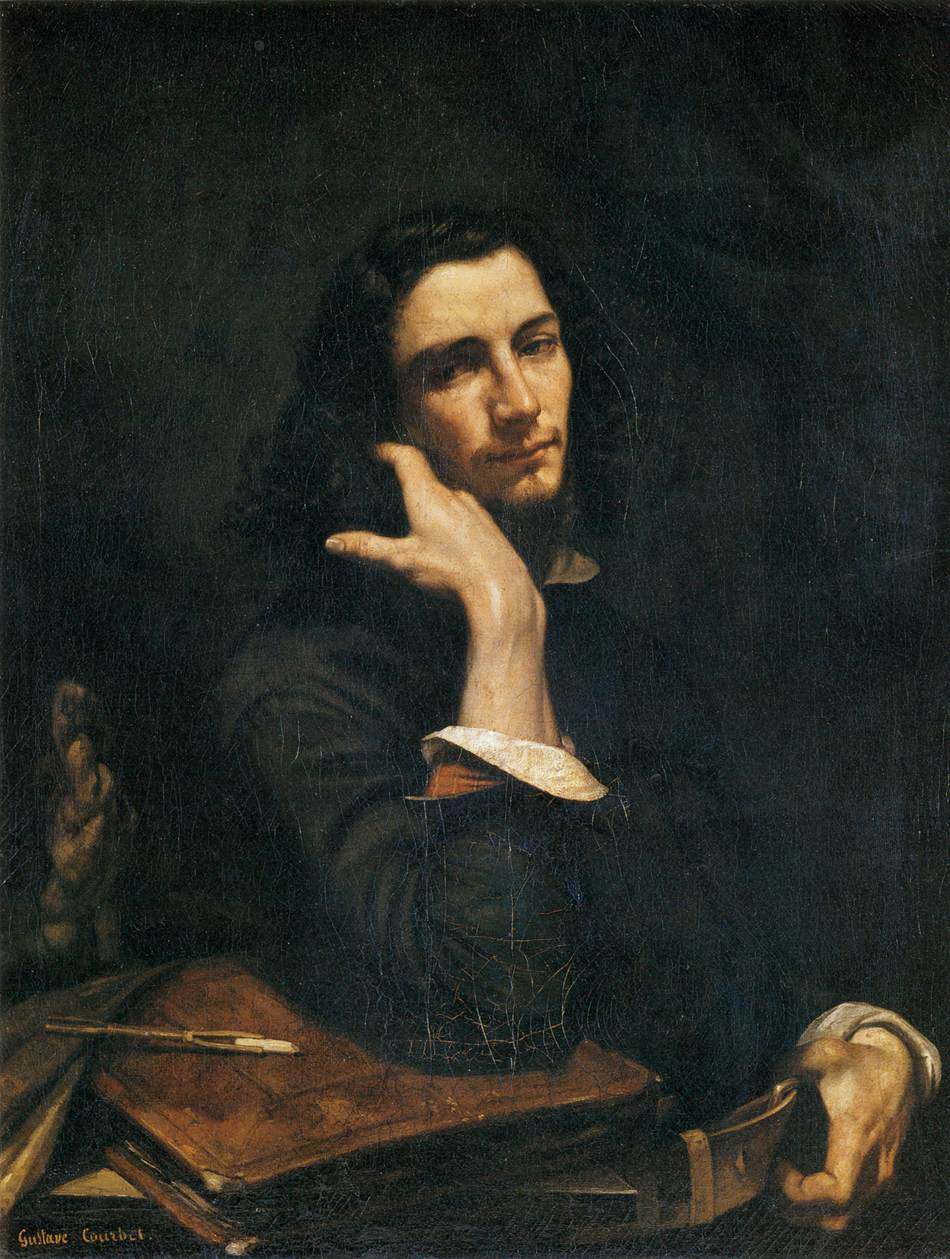
Self-Portrait (Man with Leather Belt), c. 1845

Gustave Courbet was born in 1819 to Régis and Sylvie Oudot Courbet in Ornans (department of Doubs). Anti-monarchical feelings prevailed in the household. (His maternal grandfather fought in the French Revolution.) Courbet's sisters, Zoé, Zélie, and Juliette were his first models for drawing and painting. After moving to Paris he often returned home to Ornans to hunt, fish, and find inspiration.

Courbet went to Paris in 1839 and worked at the studio of Steuben and Hesse. An independent spirit, he soon left, preferring to develop his own style by studying the paintings of Spanish, Flemish and French masters in the Louvre, and painting copies of their work.

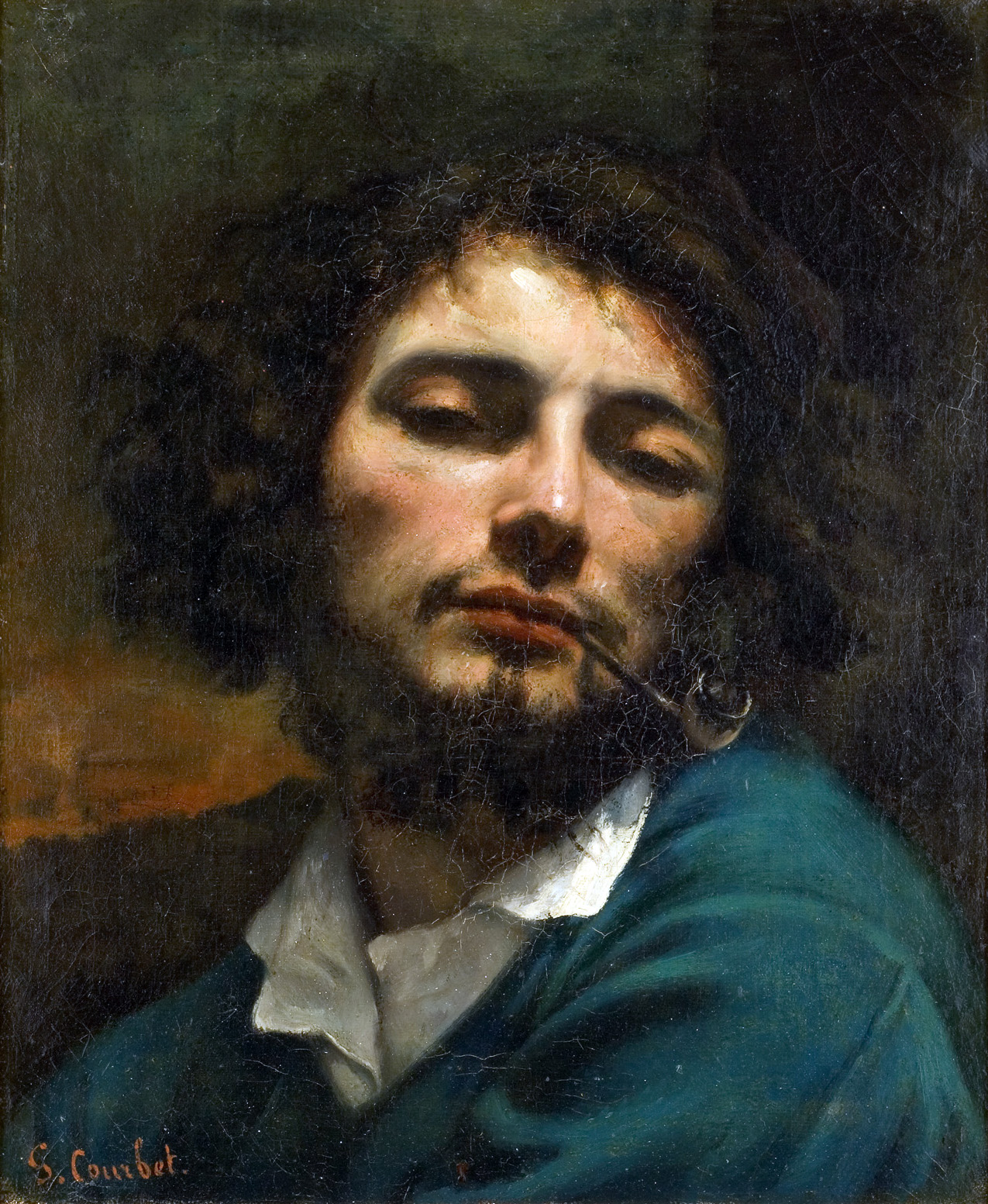
Self-Portrait with Pipe, 1849, Musée Fabre, Montpellier

Courbet's first works were an Odalisque inspired by the writing of Victor Hugo and a Lélia illustrating George Sand, but he soon abandoned literary influences, choosing instead to base his paintings on observed reality. Among his paintings of the early 1840s are several self-portraits, Romantic in conception, in which the artist portrayed himself in various roles. These include Self-Portrait with Black Dog (c. 1842–44, accepted for exhibition at the Salon of 1844), the theatrical Self-Portrait which is also known as Desperate Man (c. 1843–45), Lovers in the Countryside (1844, Musée des Beaux-Arts, Lyon), The Sculptor (1845), The Wounded Man (1844–54, Musée d'Orsay, Paris), The Cellist, Self-Portrait (1847, Nationalmuseum, Stockholm, shown at the 1848 Salon), and Man with a Pipe (1848–49, Musée Fabre, Montpellier).

Trips to the Netherlands and Belgium in 1846–47 strengthened Courbet's belief that painters should portray the life around them, as Rembrandt, Hals and other Dutch masters had. By 1848, he had gained supporters among the younger critics, the Neo-romantics and Realists, notably Champfleury.

Courbet achieved his first Salon success in the Salon of 1849 with his painting After Dinner at Ornans. The work, reminiscent of Chardin and Le Nain, earned Courbet a gold medal and was purchased by the state. The gold medal meant that his works would no longer require jury approval for exhibition at the Salon—an exemption Courbet enjoyed until 1857 (when the rule changed).

In 1849–50, Courbet painted The Stone Breakers (destroyed in the Allied Bombing of Dresden in 1945), which Proudhon admired as an icon of peasant life; it has been called "the first of his great works". The painting was inspired by a scene Courbet witnessed on the roadside. He later explained to Champfleury and the writer Francis Wey: "It is not often that one encounters so complete an expression of poverty and so, right then and there I got the idea for a painting. I told them to come to my studio the next morning."

== Realism ==
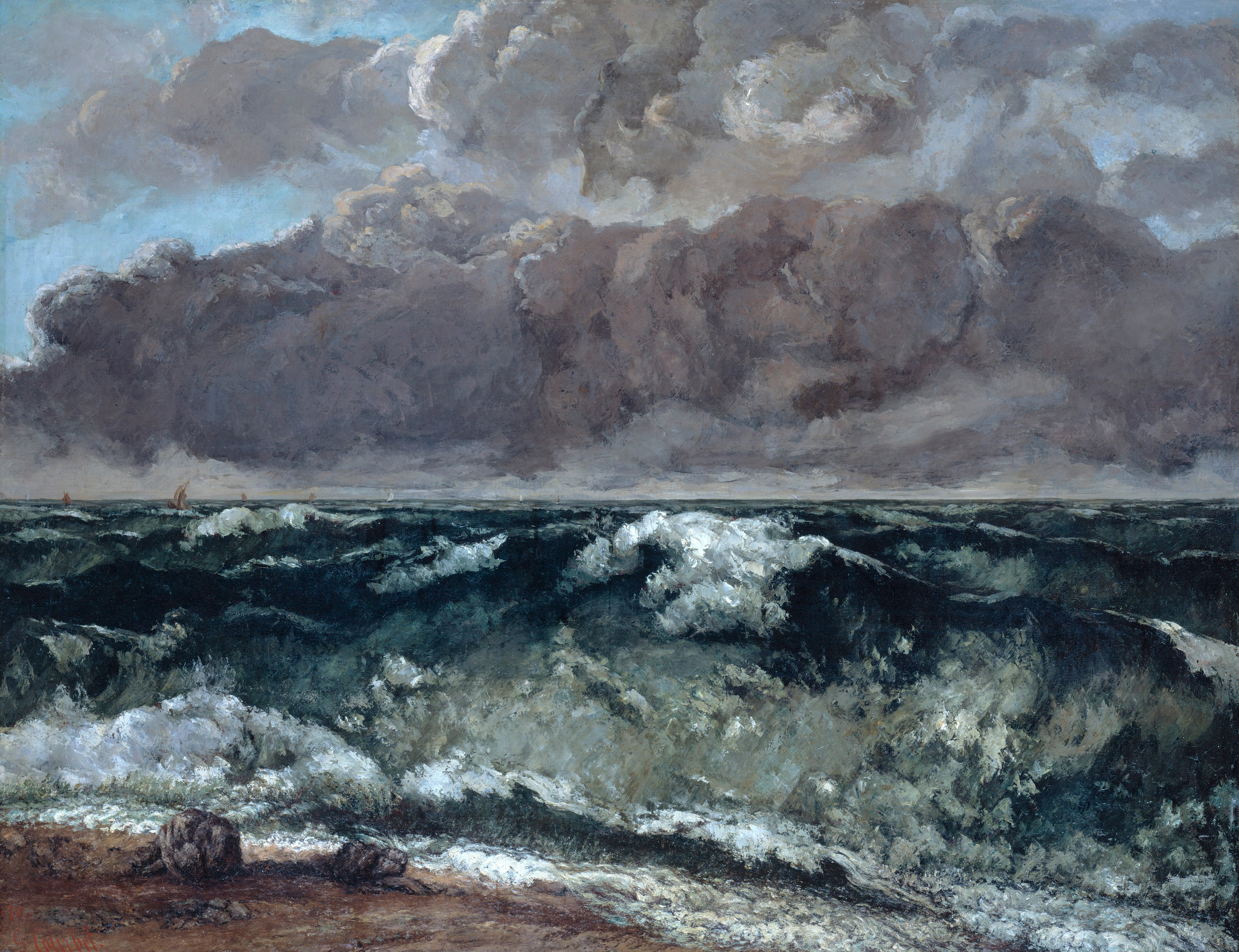
The Wave (La Vague), 1869, oil on canvas, 66 cm × 90 cm (26 in × 35 in), Musée des beaux-arts de Lyon

Courbet's work belonged neither to the predominant Romantic nor Neoclassical schools. History painting, which the Paris Salon esteemed as a painter's highest calling, did not interest him, for he believed that "the artists of one century [are] basically incapable of reproducing the aspect of a past or future century ..." Instead, he maintained that the only possible source for living art is the artist's own experience. He and Jean-François Millet would find inspiration painting the life of peasants and workers.

Courbet painted figurative compositions, landscapes, seascapes, and still lifes. He courted controversy by addressing social issues in his work, and by painting subjects that were considered vulgar, such as the rural bourgeoisie, peasants, and working conditions of the poor. His work, along with that of Honoré Daumier and Jean-François Millet, became known as Realism. For Courbet realism dealt not with the perfection of line and form, but entailed spontaneous and rough handling of paint, suggesting direct observation by the artist while portraying the irregularities in nature. He depicted the harshness of life, and in doing so challenged contemporary academic ideas of art. One of the distinctive features of Courbet's Realism was his lifelong attachment to his native province, the Franche-Comté, and of his birthplace, Ornans.

=== The Stone Breakers ===
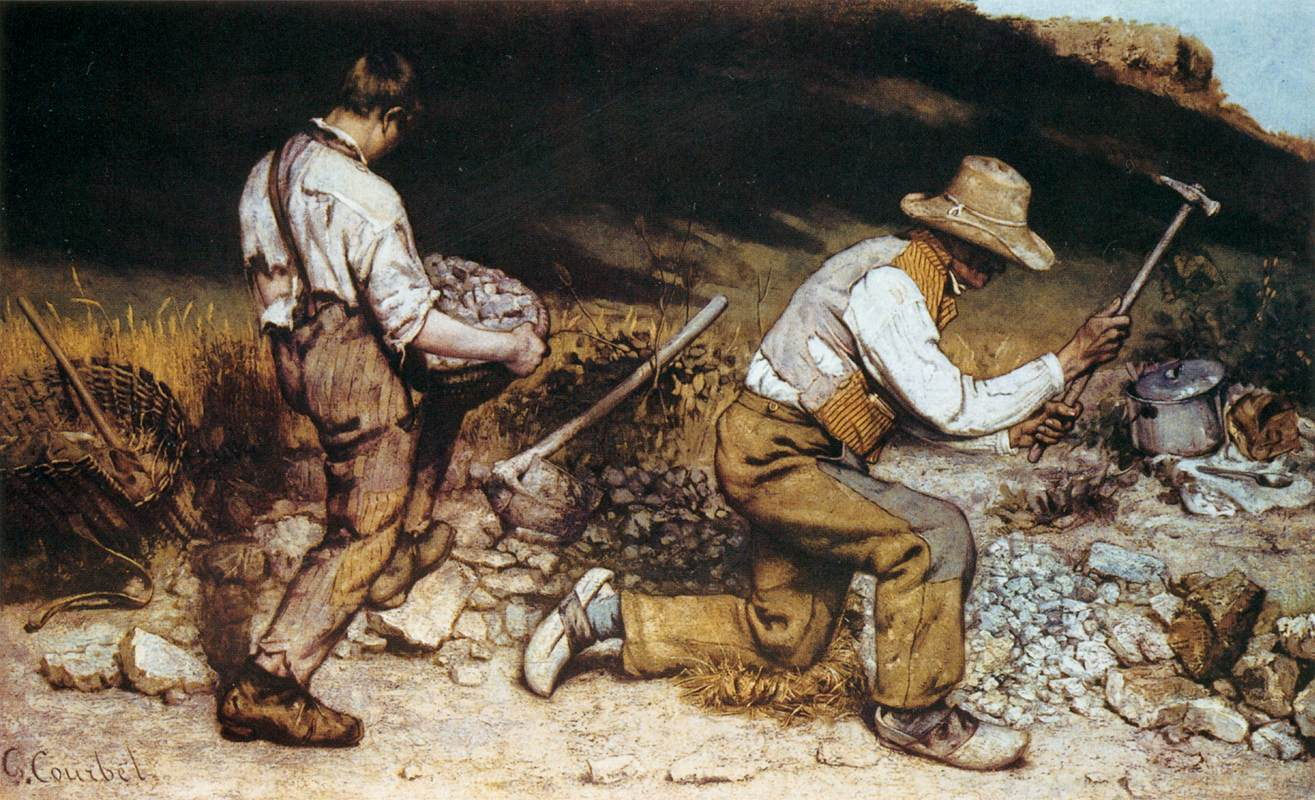
Gustave Courbet, The Stone Breakers 1849, oil on canvas, first exhibited at the Paris Salon of 1850, destroyed during World War II.

Considered to be the first of Courbet's great works, The Stone Breakers of 1849 is an example of social realism that caused a sensation when it was first exhibited at the Paris Salon of 1850. The work was based on two men, one young and one old, whom Courbet discovered engaged in backbreaking labor on the side of the road when he returned to Ornans for an eight-month visit in October 1848. On his inspiration, Courbet told his friends and art critics Francis Wey and Jules Champfleury, "It is not often that one encounters so complete an expression of poverty and so, right then and there I got the idea for a painting."

While other artists had depicted the plight of the rural poor, Courbet's peasants are not idealized like those in works such as Breton's 1854 painting, The Gleaners.

During World War II, from 13 to 15 February 1945, the Allies continuously bombed the city of Dresden, Germany. German troops hastily loaded artworks from Dresden's galleries and museums onto trucks. The Stone Breakers was destroyed, along with 153 other paintings, when a transport vehicle moving the pictures to the Königstein Fortress, near Dresden, was bombed by Allied forces.

=== A Burial at Ornans ===
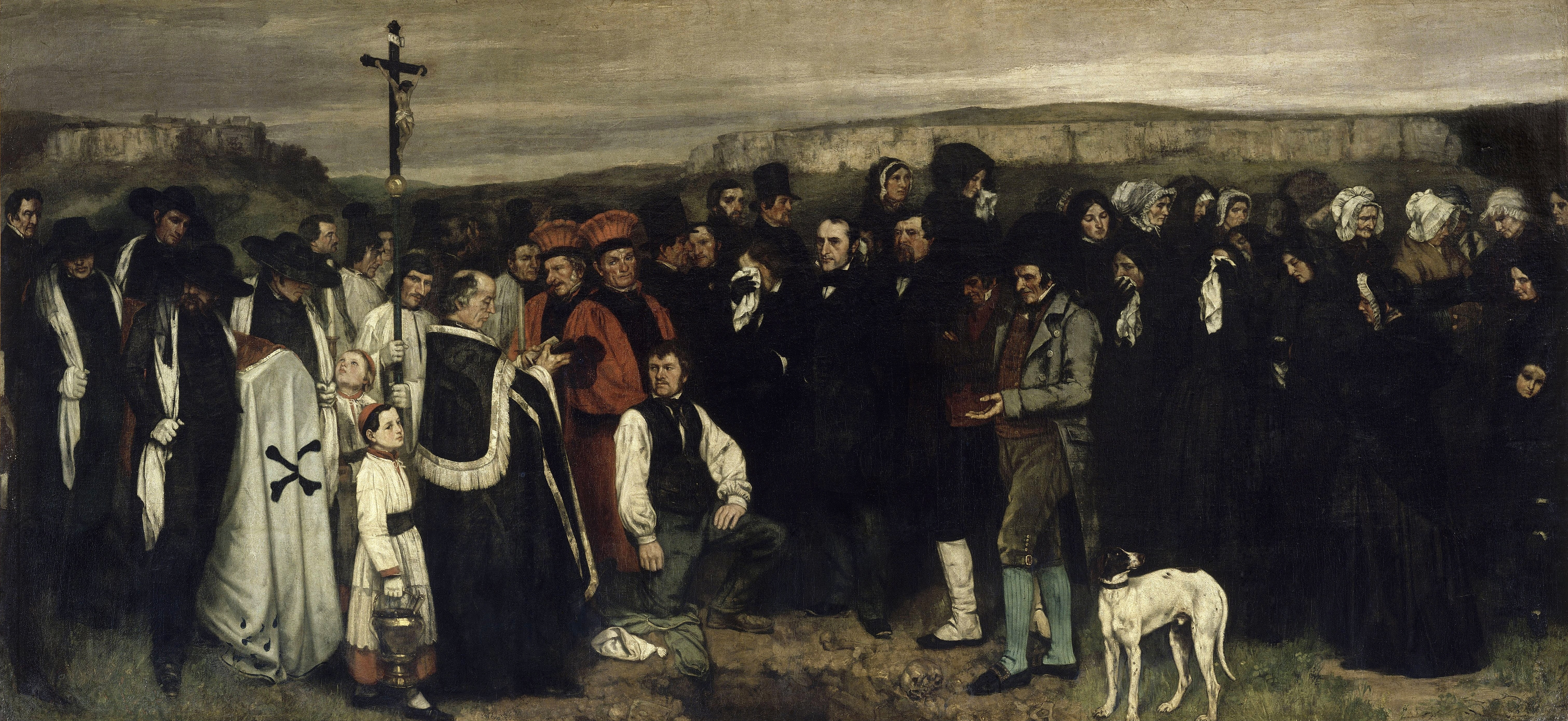
Gustave Courbet, A Burial At Ornans, 1849–50, oil on canvas, 314 cm × 663 cm (124 in × 261 in), Musée d'Orsay, Paris. Exhibition at the 1850–1851 Paris Salon created an "explosive reaction" and brought Courbet instant fame.

The Salon of 1850–1851 (Note: Political turmoil delayed the opening of the Salon of 1850 until 30 December 1850.) found him triumphant with The Stone Breakers, the Peasants of Flagey and A Burial at Ornans. The Burial, one of Courbet's most important works, records the funeral of his grand uncle which he attended in September 1848. People who attended the funeral were the models for the painting. Previously, models had been used as actors in historical narratives, but in Burial Courbet said he "painted the very people who had been present at the interment, all the townspeople". The result is a realistic presentation of them and life in Ornans.

The vast painting, measuring 10 by 22 feet (3.0 by 6.7 meters), drew both praise and fierce denunciations from critics and the public, in part because it upset convention by depicting a prosaic ritual on a scale which would previously have been reserved for a religious or royal subject.

According to art historian Sarah Faunce, "In Paris, the Burial was judged as a work that had thrust itself into the grand tradition of history painting, like an upstart in dirty boots crashing a genteel party, and in terms of that tradition it was, of course, found wanting." The painting lacks the sentimental rhetoric that was expected in a genre work: Courbet's mourners make no theatrical gestures of grief, and their faces seemed more caricatured than ennobled. The critics accused Courbet of a deliberate pursuit of ugliness.

Eventually, the public grew more interested in the new Realist approach, and the lavish, decadent fantasy of Romanticism lost popularity. Courbet well understood the importance of the painting, and said of it, "Burial at Ornans was in reality the burial of romanticism."

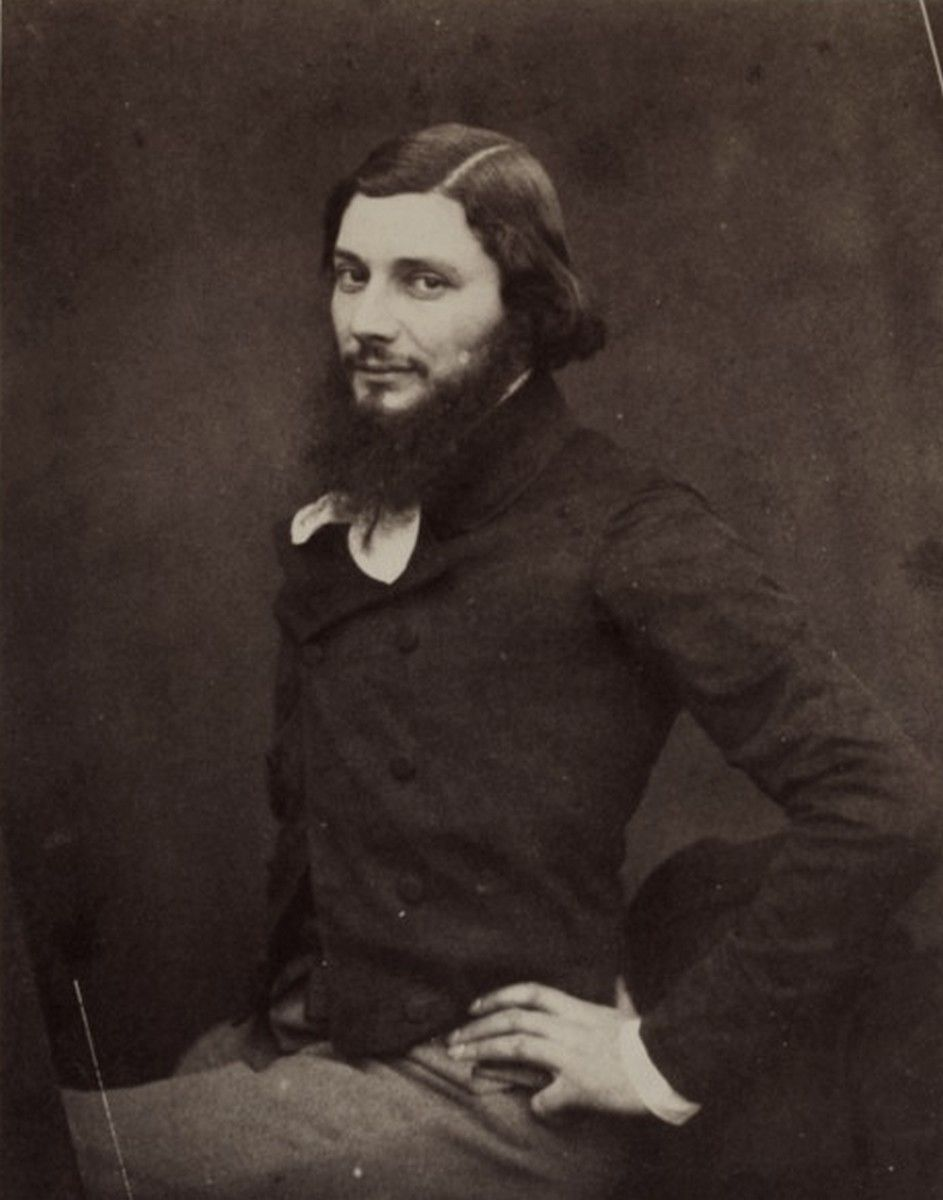
Courbet, about 1850

Courbet became a celebrity and was spoken of as a genius, a "terrible socialist" and a "savage". He actively encouraged the public's perception of him as an unschooled peasant, while his ambition, his bold pronouncements to journalists, and his insistence on depicting his own life in his art gave him a reputation for unbridled vanity.

Courbet associated his ideas of realism in art with political anarchism, and, having gained an audience, he promoted political ideas by writing politically motivated essays and dissertations. His familiar visage was the object of frequent caricature in the popular French press.

In 1850, Courbet wrote to a friend:

...in our so very civilized society it is necessary for me to live the life of a savage. I must be free even of governments. The people have my sympathies, I must address myself to them directly.

During the 1850s, Courbet painted numerous figurative works using common folk and friends as his subjects, such as Village Damsels (1852), The Wrestlers (1853), The Bathers (1853), The Sleeping Spinner (1853), and The Wheat Sifters (1854).

=== The Artist's Studio ===
The Artist's Studio (L'Atelier du peintre): A Real Allegory of a Seven Year Phase in my Artistic and Moral Life, 1855, 359 cm × 598 cm (141 in × 235 in), oil on canvas, Musée d'Orsay, Paris

In 1855, Courbet submitted fourteen paintings for exhibition at the Salon of 1855, part of the Exposition Universelle. Three were rejected for lack of space, including A Burial at Ornans and his other monumental canvas The Artist's Studio. Refusing to be denied, Courbet took matters into his own hands. He displayed forty of his paintings, including The Artist's Studio, in his gallery called The Pavilion of Realism (Pavillon du Réalisme) which was a temporary structure that he erected next door to the official Salon-like Exposition Universelle.

The work is an allegory of Courbet's life as a painter, seen as a heroic venture, in which he is flanked by friends and admirers on the right, and challenges and opposition to the left. Friends on the right include the art critics Champfleury, and Charles Baudelaire, and art collector Alfred Bruyas. On the left are figures (priest, prostitute, grave digger, merchant, and others) who represent what Courbet described in a letter to Champfleury as "the other world of trivial life, the people, misery, poverty, wealth, the exploited and the exploiters, the people who live off death."

In the foreground of the left-hand side is a man with dogs, who was not mentioned in Courbet's letter to Champfleury. X-rays show he was painted later, but his role in the painting is important: he is an allegory of the then-current French Emperor, Napoleon III, identified by his famous hunting dogs and iconic twirled mustache. By placing him on the left, Courbet publicly shows his disdain for the emperor and depicts him as a criminal, suggesting that his "ownership" of France is an illegal one.

Although artists like Eugène Delacroix were ardent champions of his effort, the public went to the show mostly out of curiosity and to deride him. Attendance and sales were disappointing, but Courbet's status as a hero to the French avant-garde became assured. He was admired by the American James Abbott McNeill Whistler, and he became an inspiration to the younger generation of French artists including Édouard Manet and the Impressionist painters. The Artist's Studio was recognized as a masterpiece by Delacroix, Baudelaire, and Champfleury, if not by the public.

=== Seascapes ===
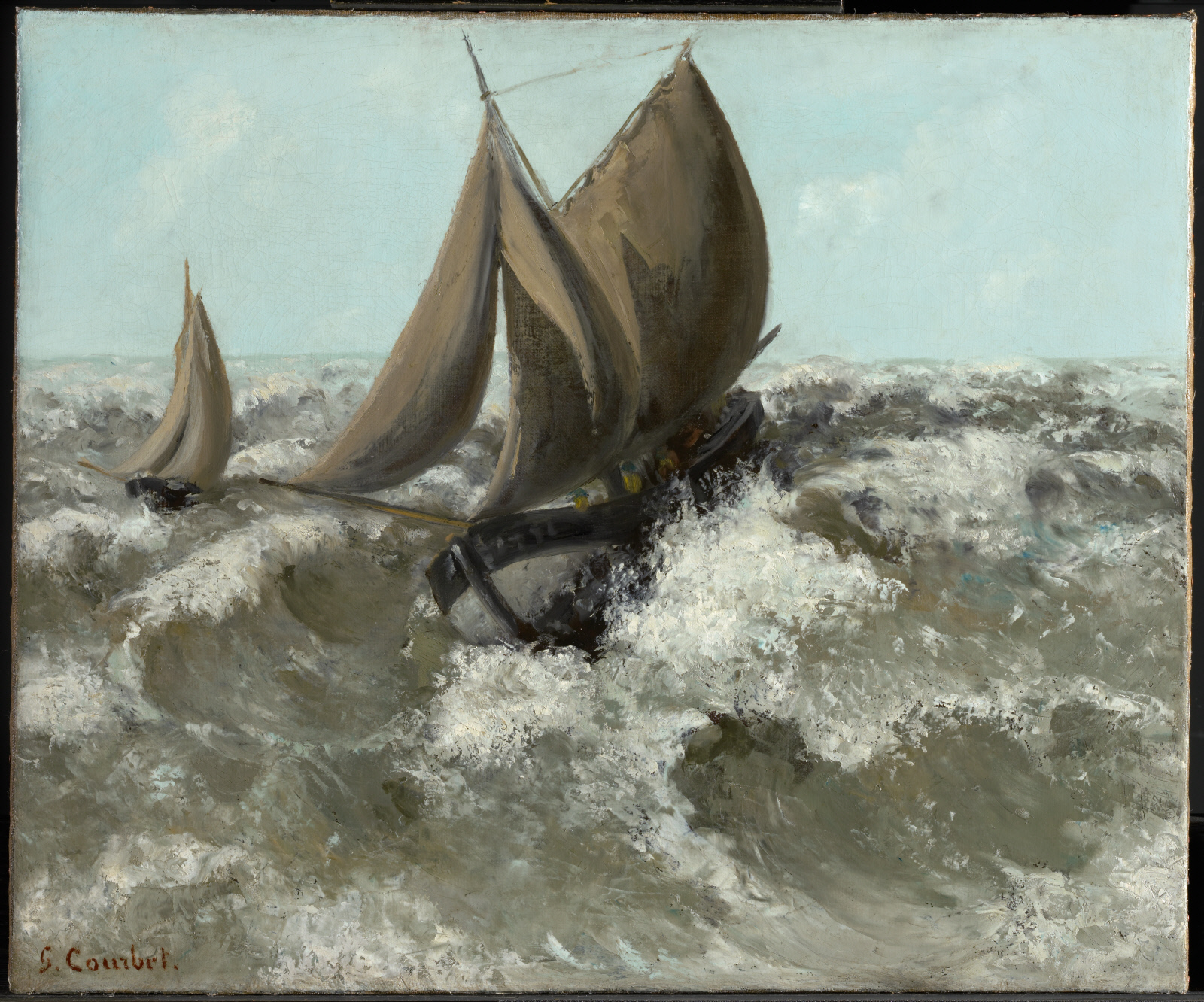
Gustave Courbet, The Sailboat (Seascape), c. 1869, oil on canvas, Clark Art Institute

While Courbet's seascapes, painted during his many visits to the northern coast of France in the late 1860s, were decidedly less controversial than his salon submissions, they furthered his contributions (willing or otherwise) to realism with their emphasis on both the beauty and danger of the natural world. There is a distinct range in the tones of this period with The Calm Sea (1869) depicting the serenity of the receded tide, and The Sailboat (c. 1869) showing a sailboat wrestling with violent tides.

=== Realist manifesto ===
Courbet wrote a Realist manifesto for the introduction to the catalogue of this independent, personal exhibition, echoing the tone of the period's political manifestos. In it, he asserts his goal as an artist is "to translate the customs, the ideas, the appearance of my epoch according to my own estimation."

The title of Realist was thrust upon me just as the title of Romantic was imposed upon the men of 1830. Titles have never given a true idea of things: if it were otherwise, the works would be unnecessary.

Without expanding on the greater or lesser accuracy of a name that nobody, I should hope, can really be expected to understand, I will limit myself to a few words of elucidation in order to cut short the misunderstandings.

I have studied the art of the ancients and the art of the moderns, avoiding any preconceived system and without prejudice. I no longer wanted to imitate the one than to copy the other; nor, furthermore, was it my intention to attain the trivial goal of "art for art's sake". No! I simply wanted to draw forth, from a complete acquaintance with tradition, the reasoned and independent consciousness of my own individuality.

To know in order to do, that was my idea. To be in a position to translate the customs, the ideas, the appearance of my time, according to my own estimation; to be not only a painter but a man as well; in short, to create living art – this is my goal. (Gustave Courbet, 1855)

== Notoriety ==
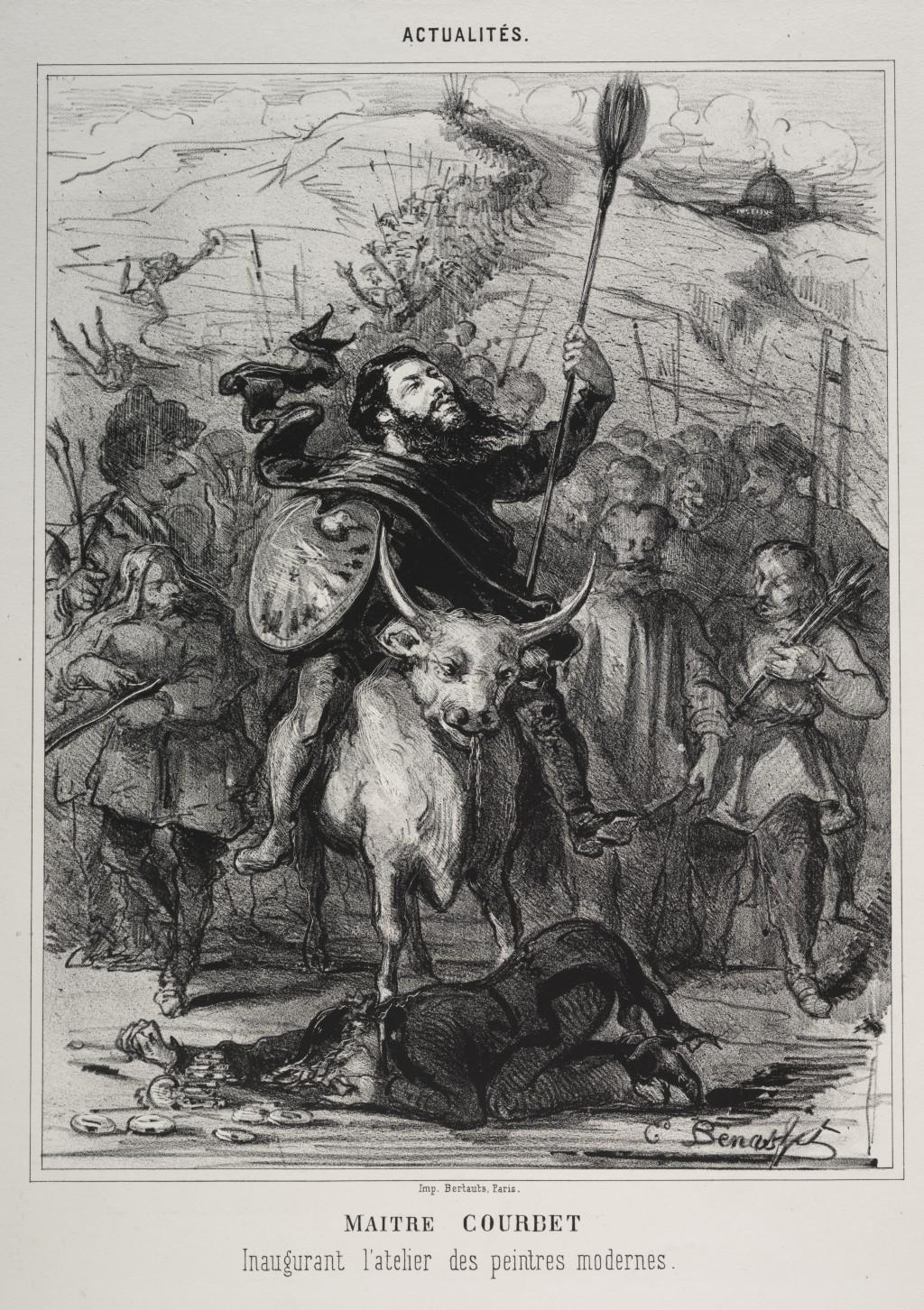
"Maitre Courbet Inaugurant l'atelier des peintres modernes, caricature by Émile Benassit from Le Boulevard, issue 1, 1861

In the Salon of 1857, Courbet showed six paintings. These included Young Ladies on the Banks of the Seine (Summer), depicting two women relaxing under a tree, as well as the first of many hunting scenes Courbet was to paint during the remainder of his life: Hind at Bay in the Snow and The Quarry.

Young Ladies on the Banks of the Seine, painted in 1856, provoked a scandal. Art critics accustomed to conventional, "timeless" nude women in landscapes were shocked by Courbet's depiction of modern women casually displaying their undergarments.

By exhibiting sensational works alongside hunting scenes, of the sort that had brought popular success to the English painter Edwin Landseer, Courbet guaranteed himself "both notoriety and sales".

During the 1860s, Courbet painted a series of increasingly erotic works such as Femme nue couchée, culminating in The Origin of the World (L'Origine du monde) (1866), which depicts female genitalia and was not publicly exhibited until 1988, and Sleep (1866), featuring two women in bed. The latter painting became the subject of a police report when it was exhibited by a picture dealer in 1872.

Until about 1861, Napoléon's regime had exhibited authoritarian characteristics, using press censorship to prevent the spread of opposition, manipulating elections, and depriving Parliament of the right to free debate or any real power. In the 1860s, however, Napoléon III made more concessions to placate his liberal opponents. This change began by allowing free debates in Parliament and public reports of parliamentary debates. Press censorship, too, was relaxed and culminated in the appointment of the Liberal Émile Ollivier, previously a leader of the opposition to Napoléon's regime, as the de facto Prime Minister in 1870. As a sign of appeasement to the Liberals who admired Courbet, Napoleon III nominated him to the Legion of Honour in 1870. His refusal of the cross of the Legion of Honour angered those in power but made him immensely popular with those who opposed the prevailing regime.

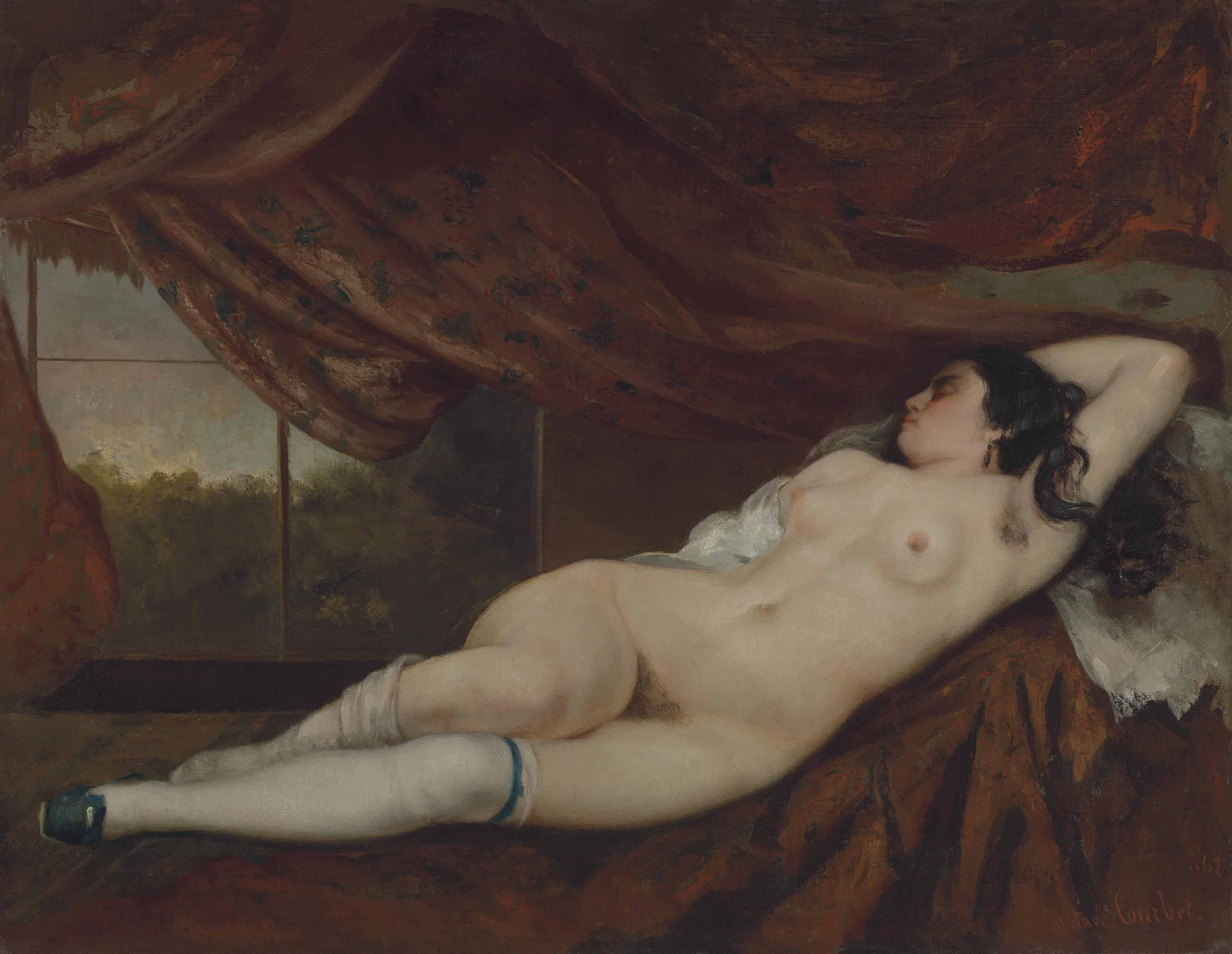
Femme nue couchée, 1862

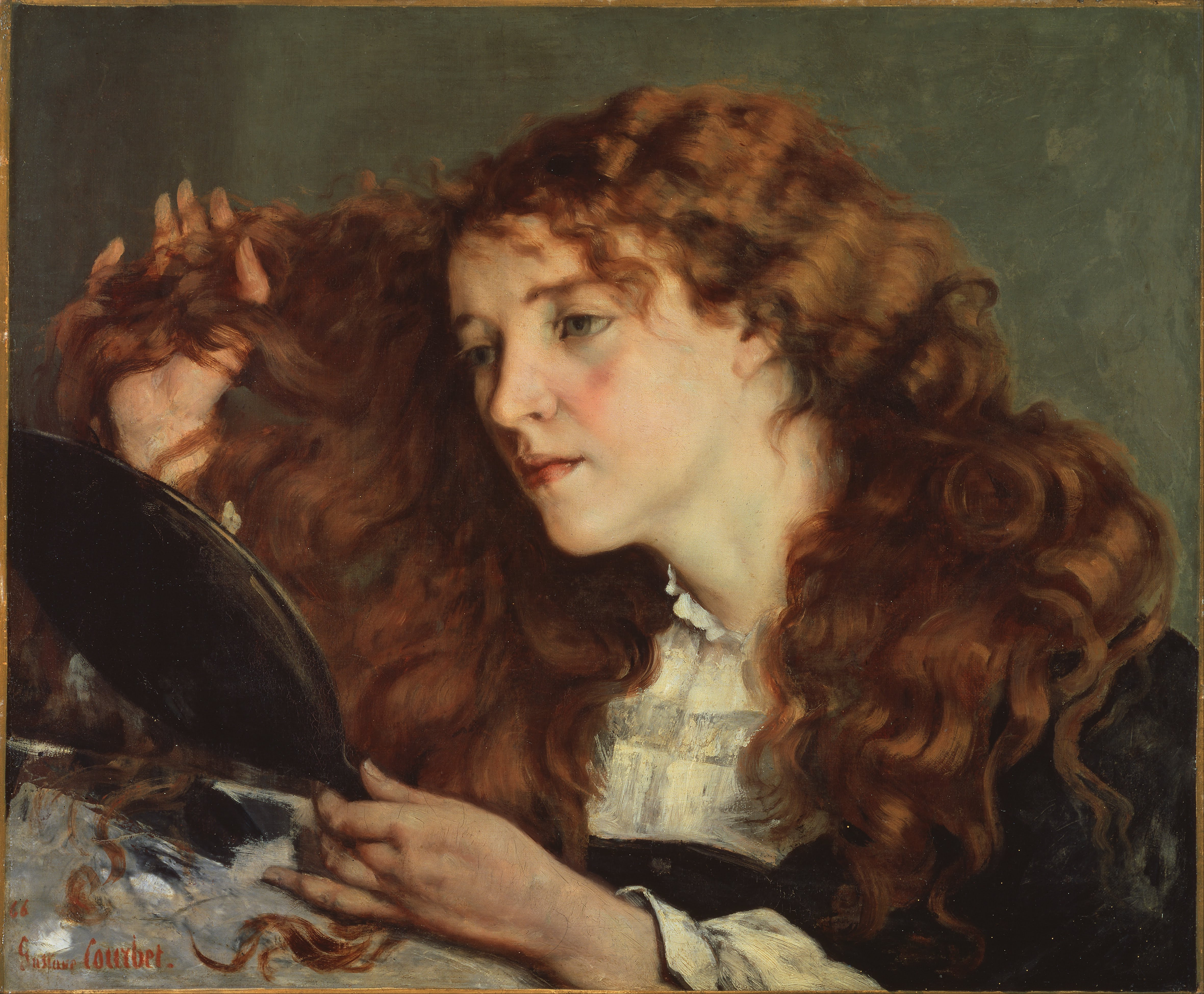
Portrait of Jo (La belle Irlandaise), 1865–66, Metropolitan Museum of Art, a painting of Joanna Hiffernan, the probable model for Sleep

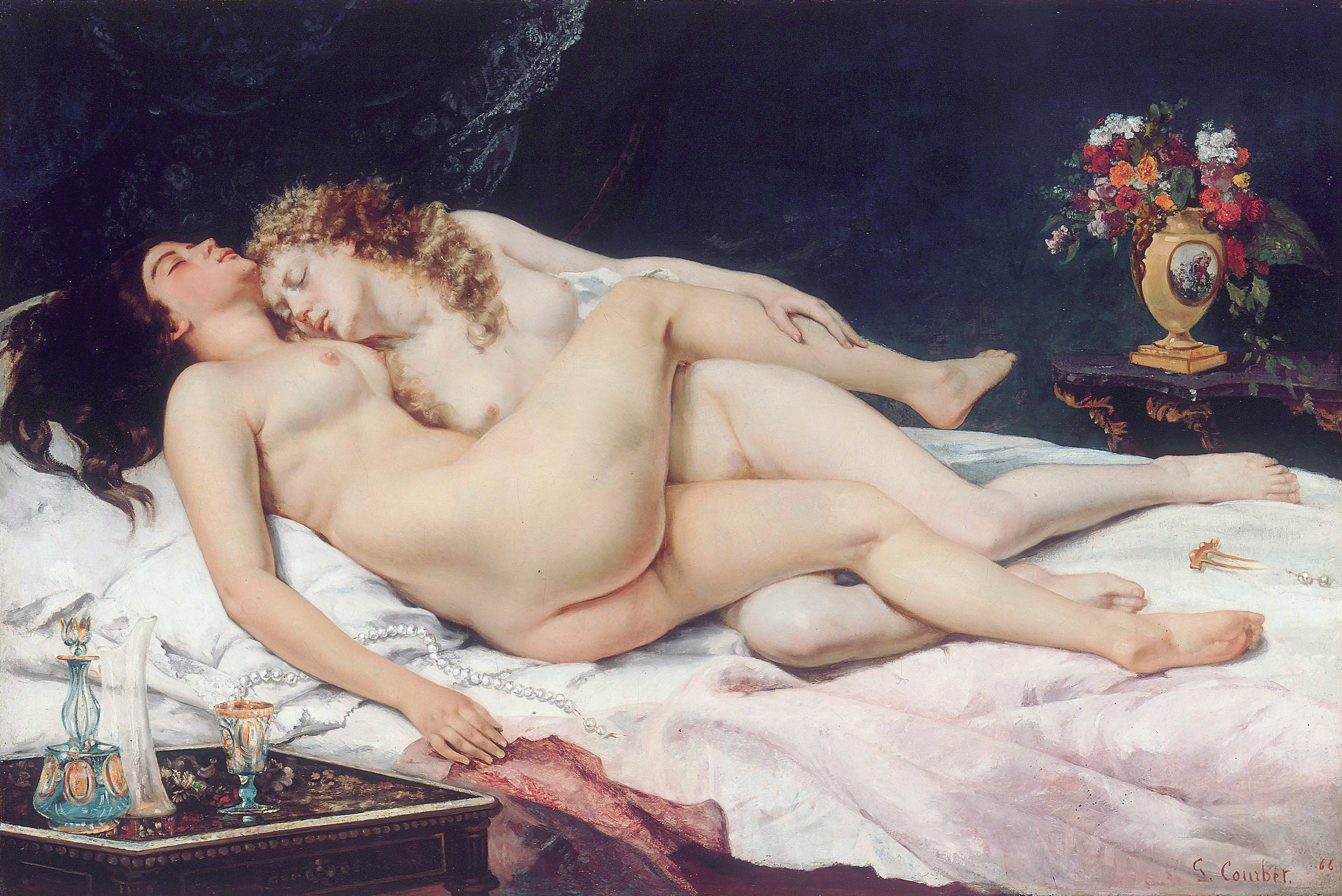
Le Sommeil (Sleep), 1866, Petit Palais, Musée des Beaux-Arts de la Ville de Paris

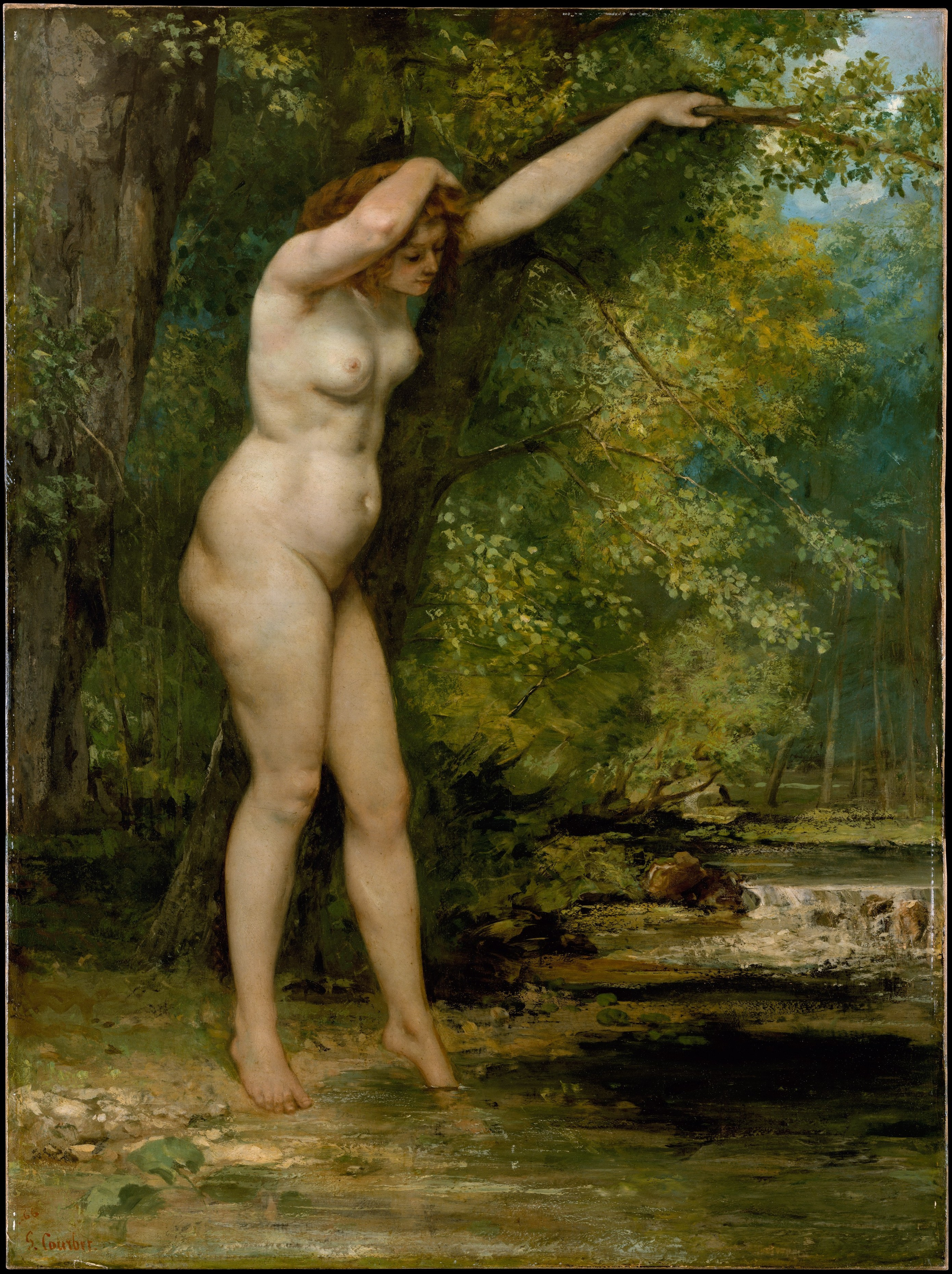
Young Bather, 1866

The Origin of the World (L'Origine du monde), 1866, Musée d'Orsay, Paris

== Courbet and the Paris Commune ==
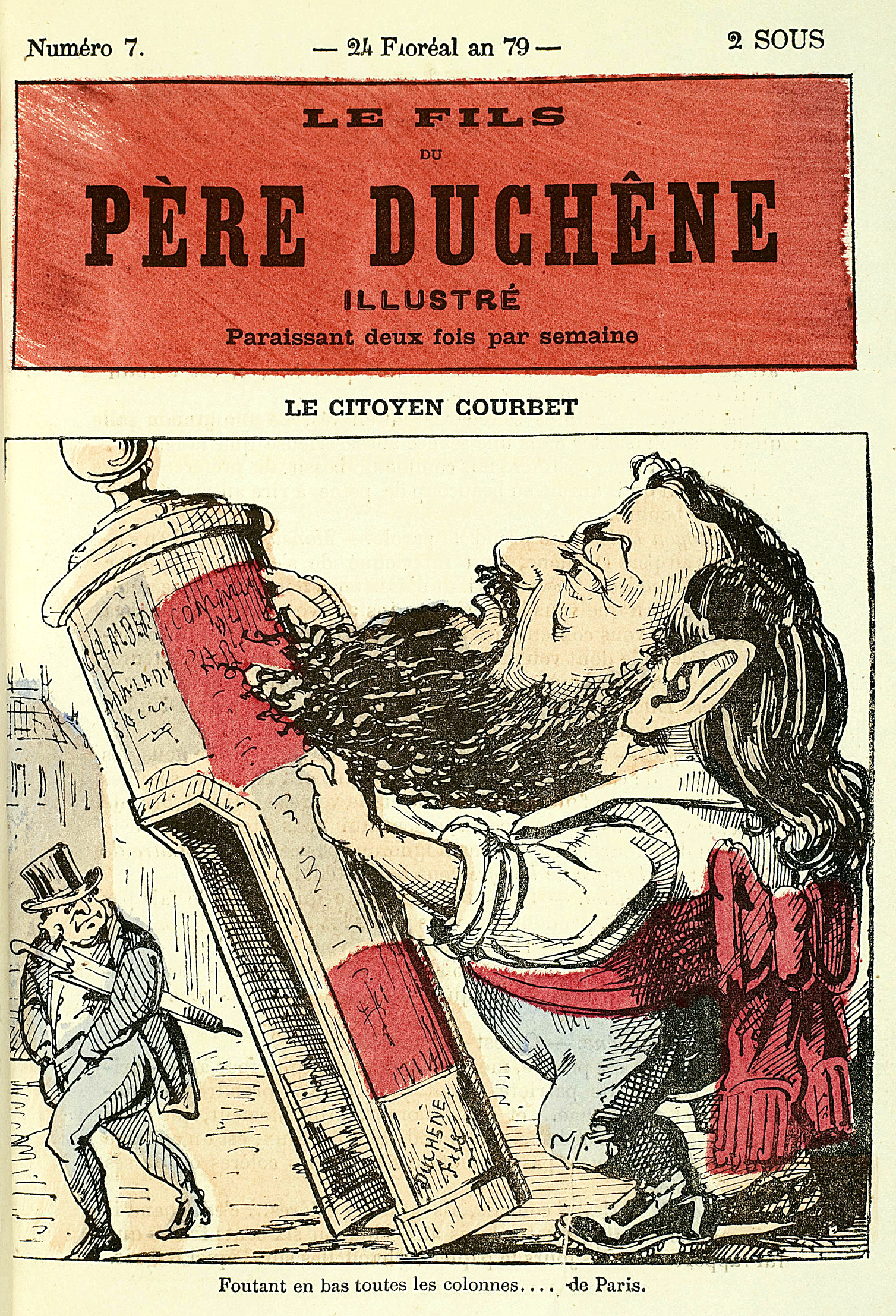
A satirical sketch of Gustave Courbet taking down a "Rambuteau column" (a urinal), caricature published by a popular Commune newspaper, the Le Fils du Père Duchêne

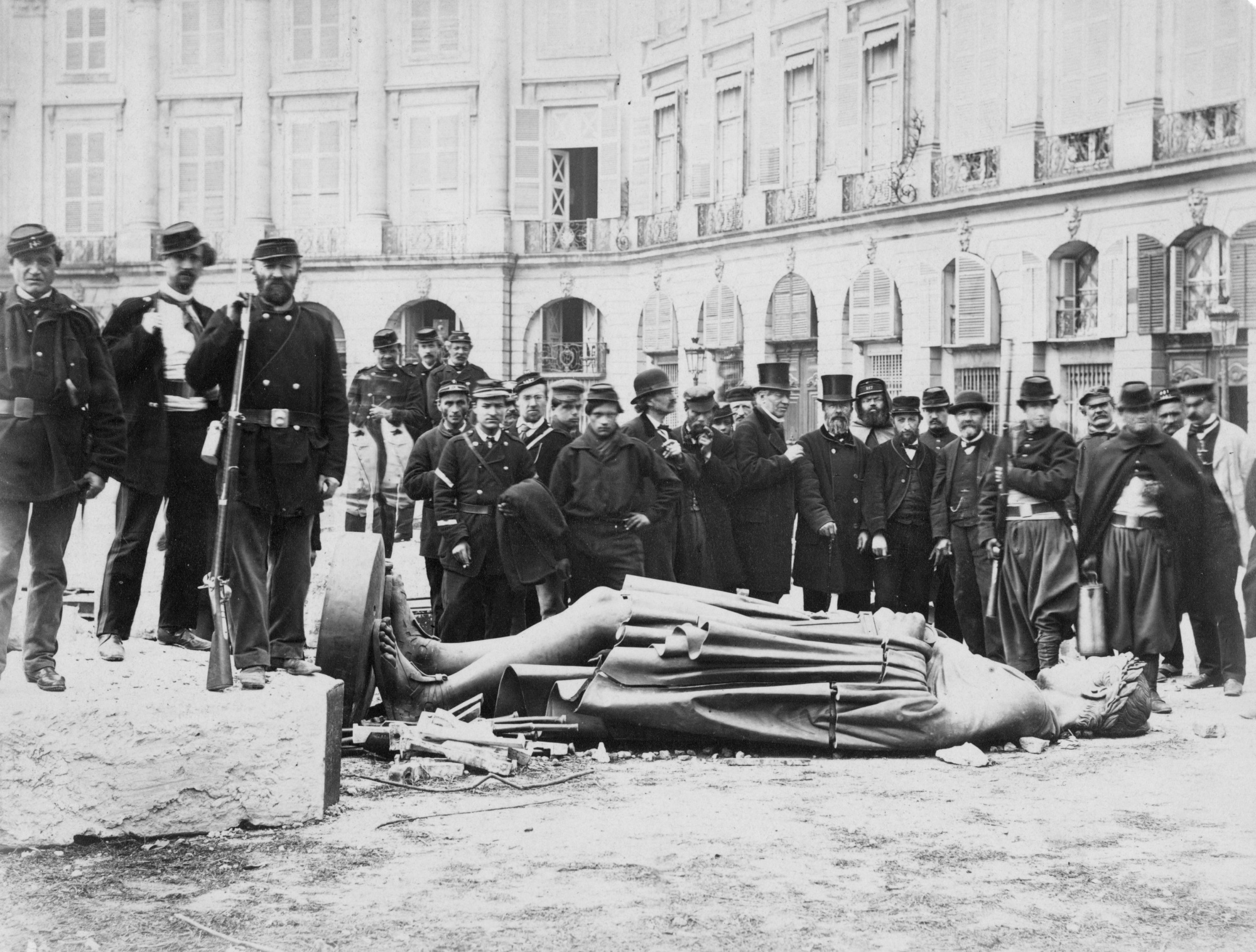
Commune officials pose with the wreckage of the Vendôme column, pulled down based on a suggestion of Courbet. After the fall of the Commune, he was ordered to pay the cost of putting the column back up.

On 4 September 1870, during the Franco-Prussian War, Courbet made a proposal that later came back to haunt him. He wrote a letter to the Government of National Defense, proposing that the column in the Place Vendôme, erected by Napoleon I to honour the victories of the French Army, be taken down. He wrote:

In as much as the Vendôme Column is a monument devoid of all artistic value, tending to perpetuate by its expression the ideas of war and conquest of the past imperial dynasty, which are reproved by a republican nation's sentiment, citizen Courbet expresses the wish that the National Defense government will authorize him to disassemble this column."

Courbet proposed that the Column be moved to a more appropriate place, such as the Hotel des Invalides, a military hospital. He also wrote an open letter addressed to the German Army and to German artists, proposing that German and French cannons should be melted down and crowned with a liberty cap, and made into a new monument on Place Vendôme, dedicated to the federation of the German and French people. The Government of National Defense did nothing about his suggestion to tear down the column, but it was not forgotten.

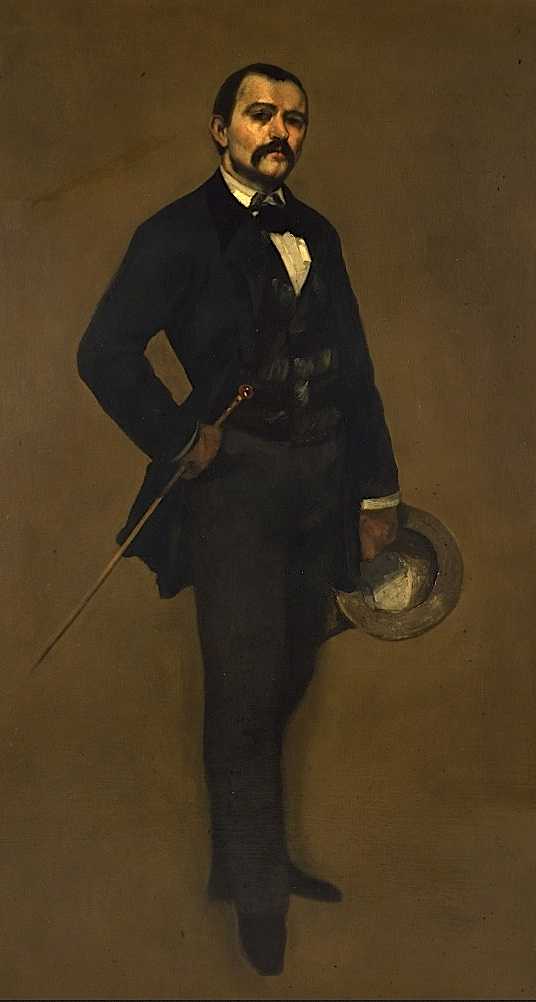
Portrait of poet Max Buchon by Courbet: the two were lifelong friends.

On 18 March, in the aftermath of the French defeat in the Franco-Prussian War, a revolutionary government called the Paris Commune briefly took power in the city. Courbet played an active part and organized a Federation of Artists, which held its first meeting on 5 April in the Grand Amphitheater of the School of Medicine. Some three hundred to four hundred painters, sculptors, architects, and decorators attended. There were some famous names on the list of members, including André Gill, Honoré Daumier, Jean-Baptiste-Camille Corot, Eugène Pottier, Jules Dalou, and Édouard Manet. Manet was not in Paris during the Commune and did not attend, and Corot, who was seventy-five years old, stayed in a country house and his studio during the Commune, not taking part in the political events.

Courbet chaired the meeting and proposed that the Louvre and the Musée du Luxembourg, the two major art museums of Paris, closed during the uprising, be reopened as soon as possible and that the traditional annual exhibit called the Salon be held as in years past, but with radical differences. He proposed that the Salon should be free of any government interference or rewards to preferred artists; no medals or government commissions would be given. Furthermore, he called for the abolition of the most famous state institutions of French art; the École des Beaux-Arts, the French Academy in Rome, the French School at Athens, and the Fine Arts section of the Institute of France.

On 12 April, the executive committee of the Commune gave Courbet, though he was not yet officially a member of the Commune, the assignment of opening the museums and organizing the Salon. They issued the following decree at the same meeting: "The Column of the Place Vendôme will be demolished." On 16 April, special elections were held to replace more moderate members of the Commune who had resigned their seats, and Courbet was elected as a delegate for the 6th arrondissement of Paris. He was given the title of Delegate of Fine Arts, and on 21 April he was also made a member of the Commission on Education. At the meeting of the commission on 27 April, the minutes reported that Courbet requested the demolition of the Vendôme column be carried out and that the column would be replaced by an allegorical figure representing the taking of power of the Commune on 18 March.

Nonetheless, Courbet was a dissident by nature, and he was soon in opposition with the majority of the Commune members on some of its measures. He was one of a minority of Commune Members who opposed the creation of a Committee on Public Safety, modeled on the committee of the same name which carried out the Reign of Terror during the French Revolution.

Courbet opposed the Commune on another more serious matter: the arrest of his friend Gustave Chaudey, a prominent socialist, magistrate, and journalist, whose portrait Courbet had painted. The popular Commune newspaper, Le Fils du Père Duchêne, accused Chaudey, when he was briefly deputy mayor of the 9th arrondissement before the Commune was formed, of ordering soldiers to fire on a crowd that had surrounded the Hôtel de Ville. Courbet's opposition was of no use; on 23 May 1871, in the final days of the Commune, Chaudey was shot by a Commune firing squad. According to some sources Courbet resigned from the Commune in protest.

On 13 May, on the proposal of Courbet, the Paris house of Adolphe Thiers, the chief executive of the French government, was demolished, and his art collection confiscated. Courbet proposed that the confiscated art be given to the Louvre and other museums, but the director of the Louvre refused to accept it. On 16 May, just nine days before the fall of the Commune, in a large ceremony with military bands and photographers, the Vendôme column was pulled down and broke into pieces. Some witnesses said Courbet was there, others denied it. The following day, the Federation of Artists debated dismissing directors of the Louvre and of the Luxembourg museums, suspected by some in the Commune of having secret contacts with the French government, and appointed new heads of the museums.

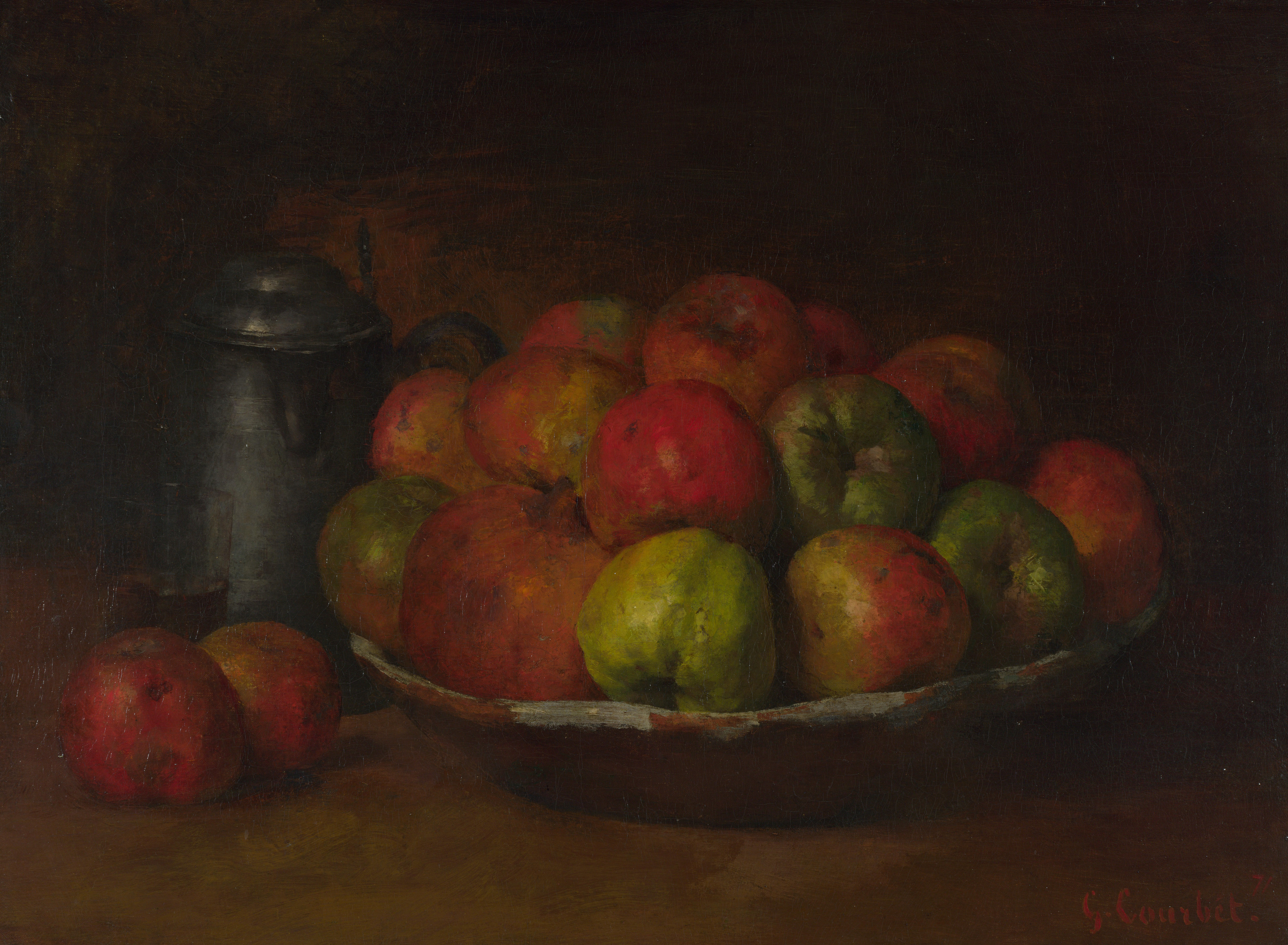
One of a series of still-life paintings Courbet made while in prison for his role in the Commune (1871). He was allowed an easel and paints, but he could not have models pose for him.

According to one legend, Courbet defended the Louvre and other museums against "looting mobs", but there are no records of any such attacks on the museums. The only real threat to the Louvre came during "Bloody Week", 21–28 May 1871, when a unit of Communards, led by a Commune general, Jules Bergeret, set fire to the Tuileries Palace, next to the Louvre. The fire spread to the library of the Louvre, which was destroyed, but the efforts of museum curators and firemen saved the art gallery.

After the final suppression of the Commune by the French army on 28 May, Courbet went into hiding in the apartments of different friends. He was arrested on 7 June. At his trial before a military tribunal on 14 August, Courbet argued that he had only joined the Commune to pacify it and that he had wanted to move the Vendôme Column, not destroy it. He said he had only belonged to the Commune for a short period, and rarely attended its meetings. He was convicted, but given a lighter sentence than other Commune leaders: six months in prison and a fine of five hundred francs. Serving part of his sentence in the Sainte-Pélagie Prison in Paris, he was allowed an easel and paints, but he could not have models pose for him. He did a famous series of still-life paintings of flowers and fruit during his confinement.

== Exile and death ==
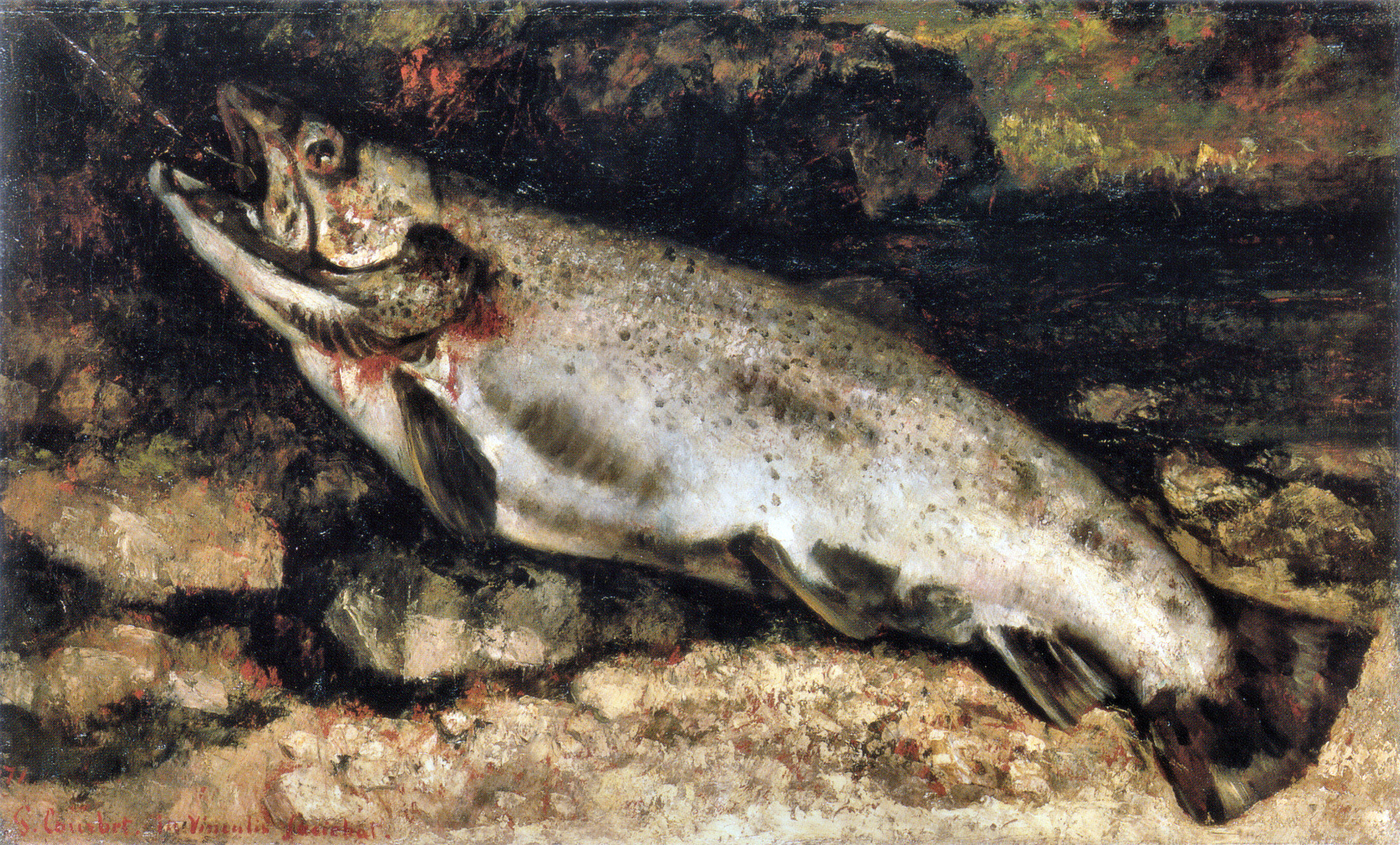
The Trout, 1871

Courbet completed his prison sentence on 2 March 1872, but his problems caused by the destruction of the Vendôme Column were still not over. In 1873, the newly elected president of the Republic, Patrice de MacMahon, announced plans to rebuild the column, with the cost to be paid by Courbet. Unable to pay, Courbet went into a self-imposed exile in Switzerland to avoid bankruptcy. In the following years, he participated in Swiss regional and national exhibitions. Surveilled by the Swiss intelligence service, he enjoyed in the small Swiss art world the reputation as head of the "realist school" and inspired younger artists such as Auguste Baud-Bovy and Ferdinand Hodler.

Important works from this period include several paintings of trout, "hooked and bleeding from the gills", that have been interpreted as allegorical self-portraits of the exiled artist. In his final years, Courbet painted landscapes, including several scenes of water mysteriously emerging from the depths of the earth in the Jura Mountains of the France–Switzerland border. Courbet also worked on sculpture during his exile. Previously, in the early 1860s, he had produced a few sculptures, one of which – the Fisherman of Chavots (1862) – he donated to Ornans for a public fountain, but it was removed after Courbet's arrest.

In May 1877, the state set the final cost of reconstructing the Vendôme Column at 323,000 francs for Courbet to repay in annual installments of 10,000 francs for the next 33 years. On 31 December 1877, a day before the first installment was due, Courbet died, aged 58, in La Tour-de-Peilz, Switzerland, of a liver disease aggravated by consumption of alcoholic beverages.

== Gallery ==
Self-portraits

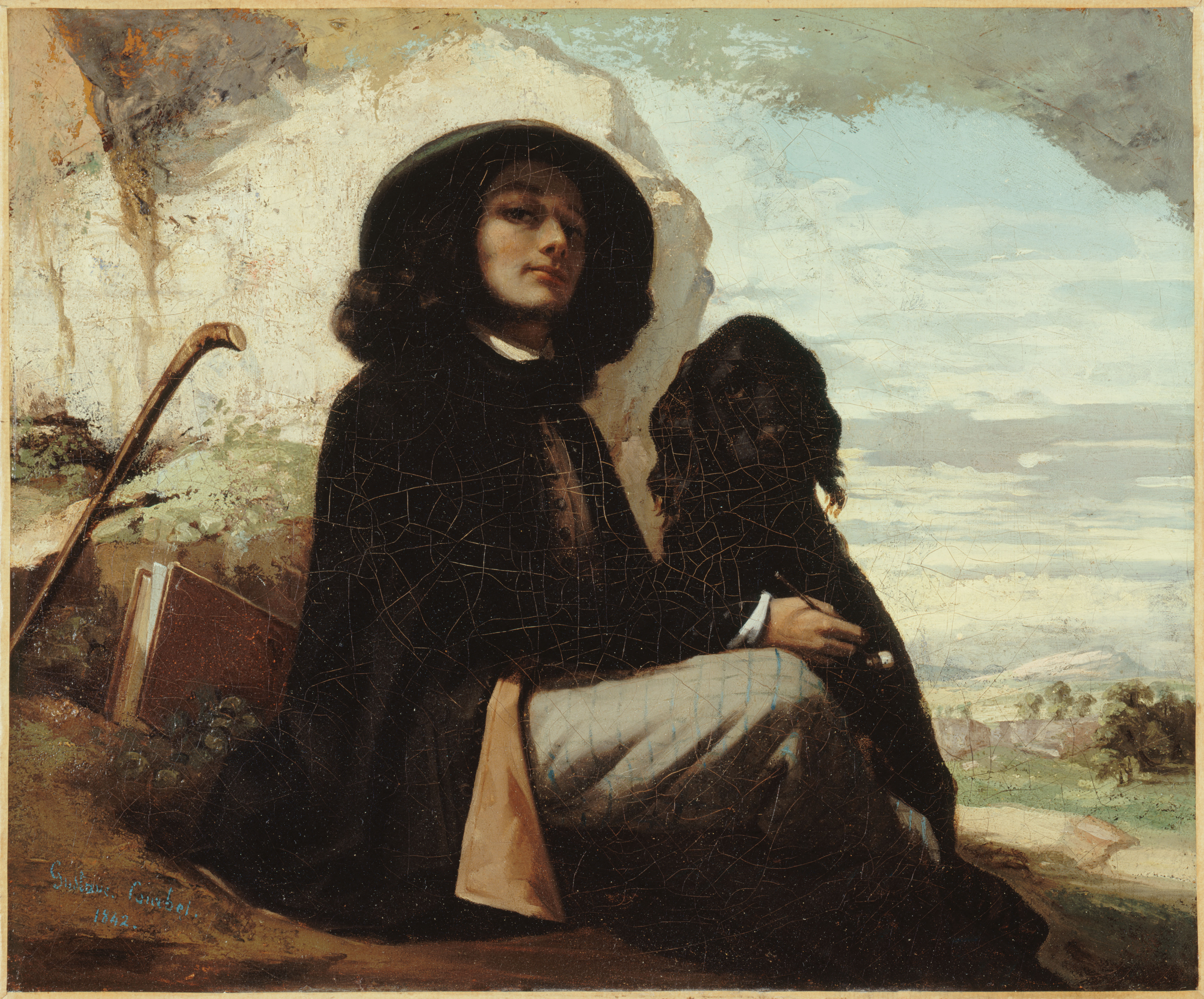
Self-Portrait with a Black Dog, 1842

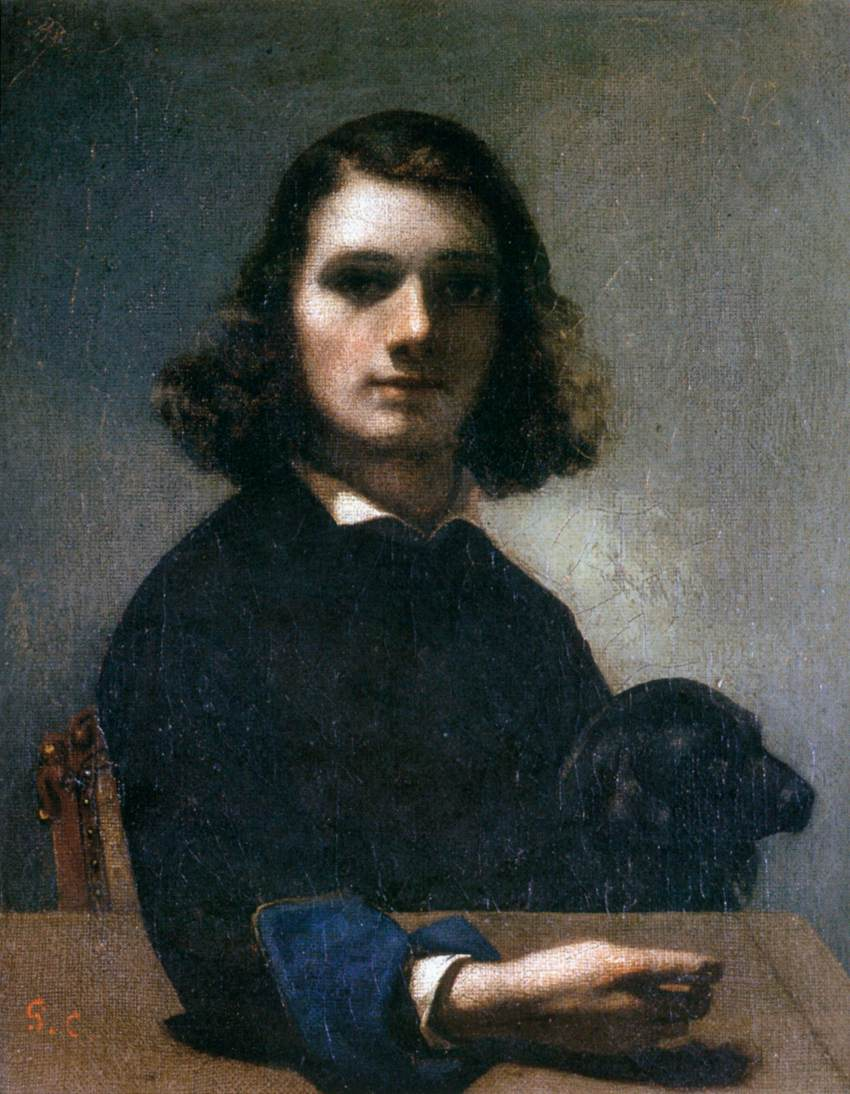
Self-portrait, 1842

Self-portrait (The Desperate Man), c. 1843–1845

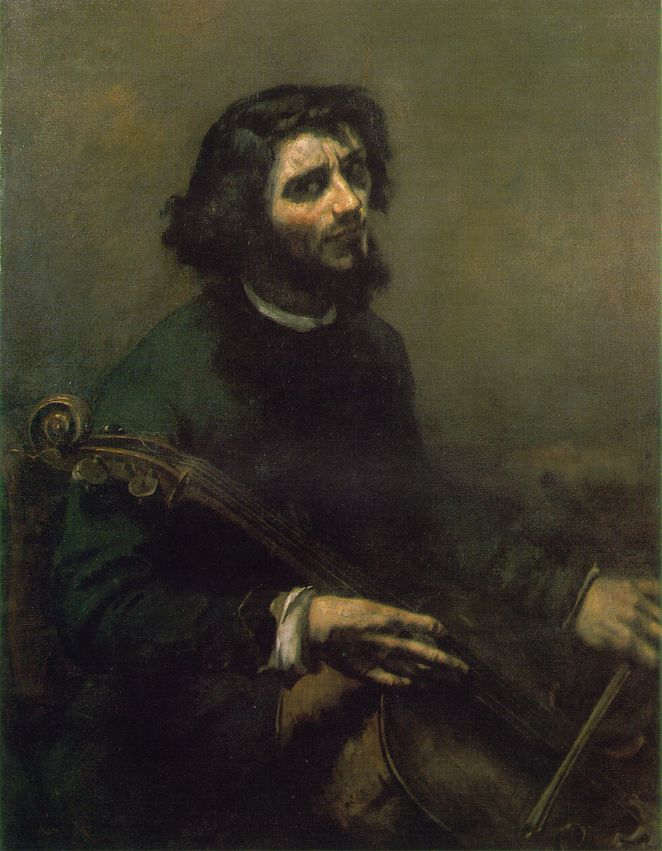
The Cellist, Self-portrait, 1847, Nationalmuseum, Stockholm

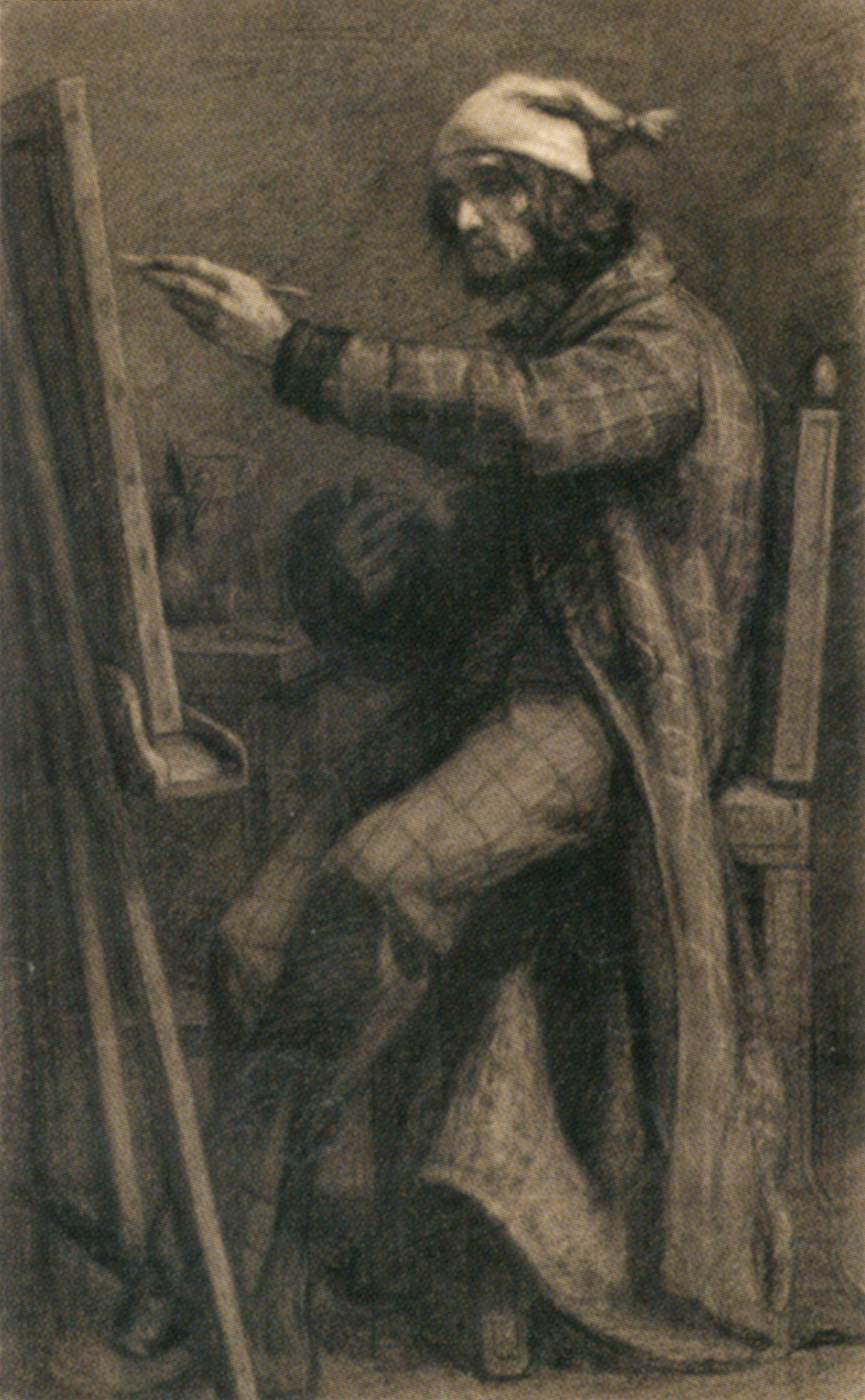
Artist at His Easel, c. 1847–48, charcoal on paper
Portraits

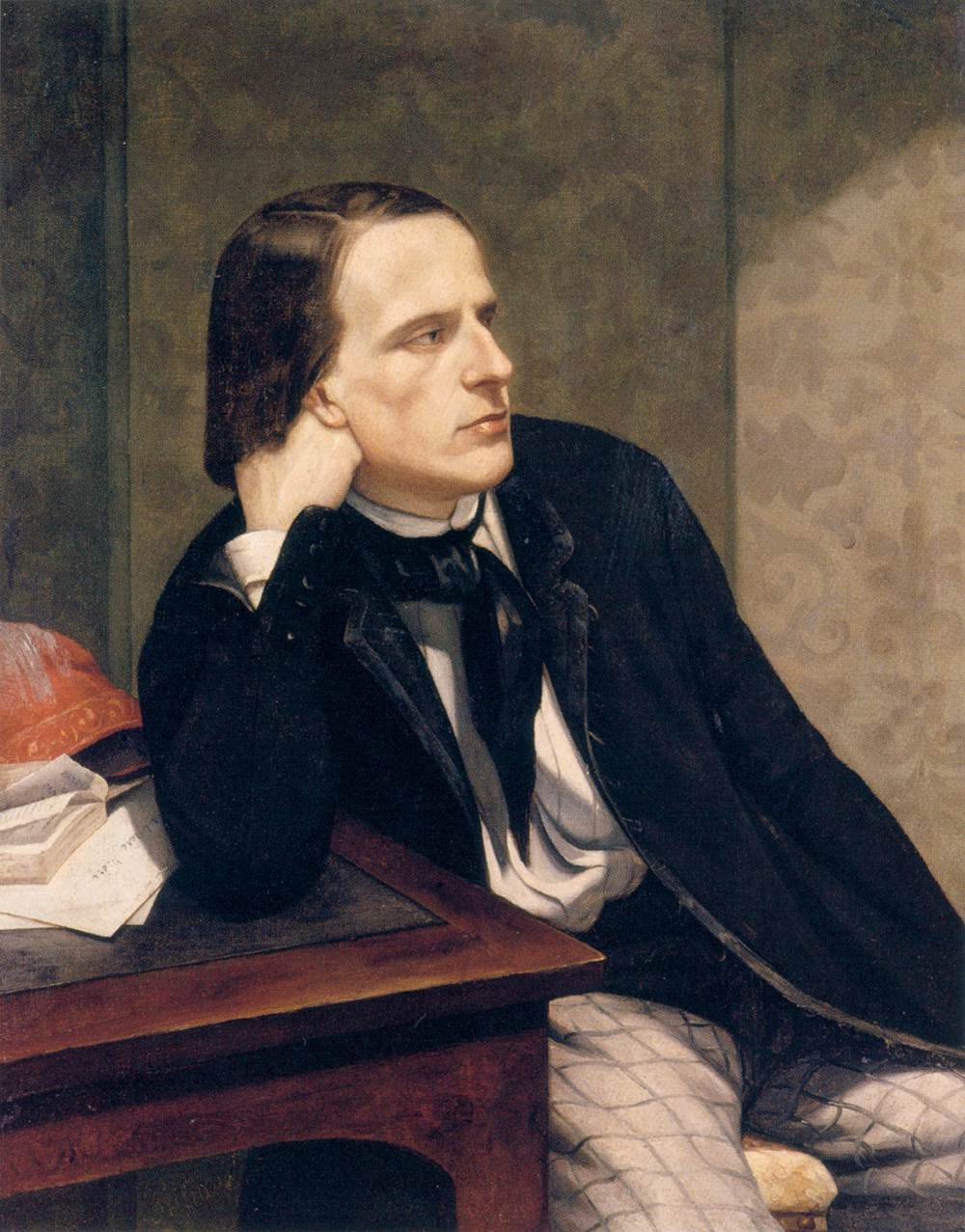
Portrait of Paul Ansout, c. 1842–43

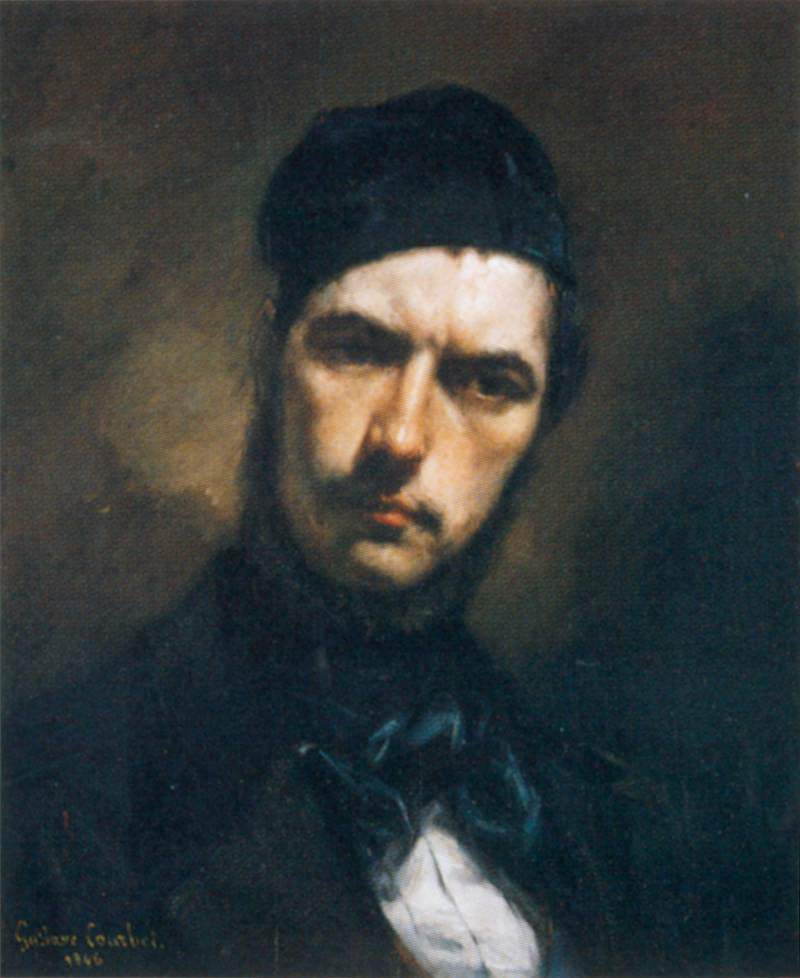
Portrait of H. J. van Wisselingh, 1846

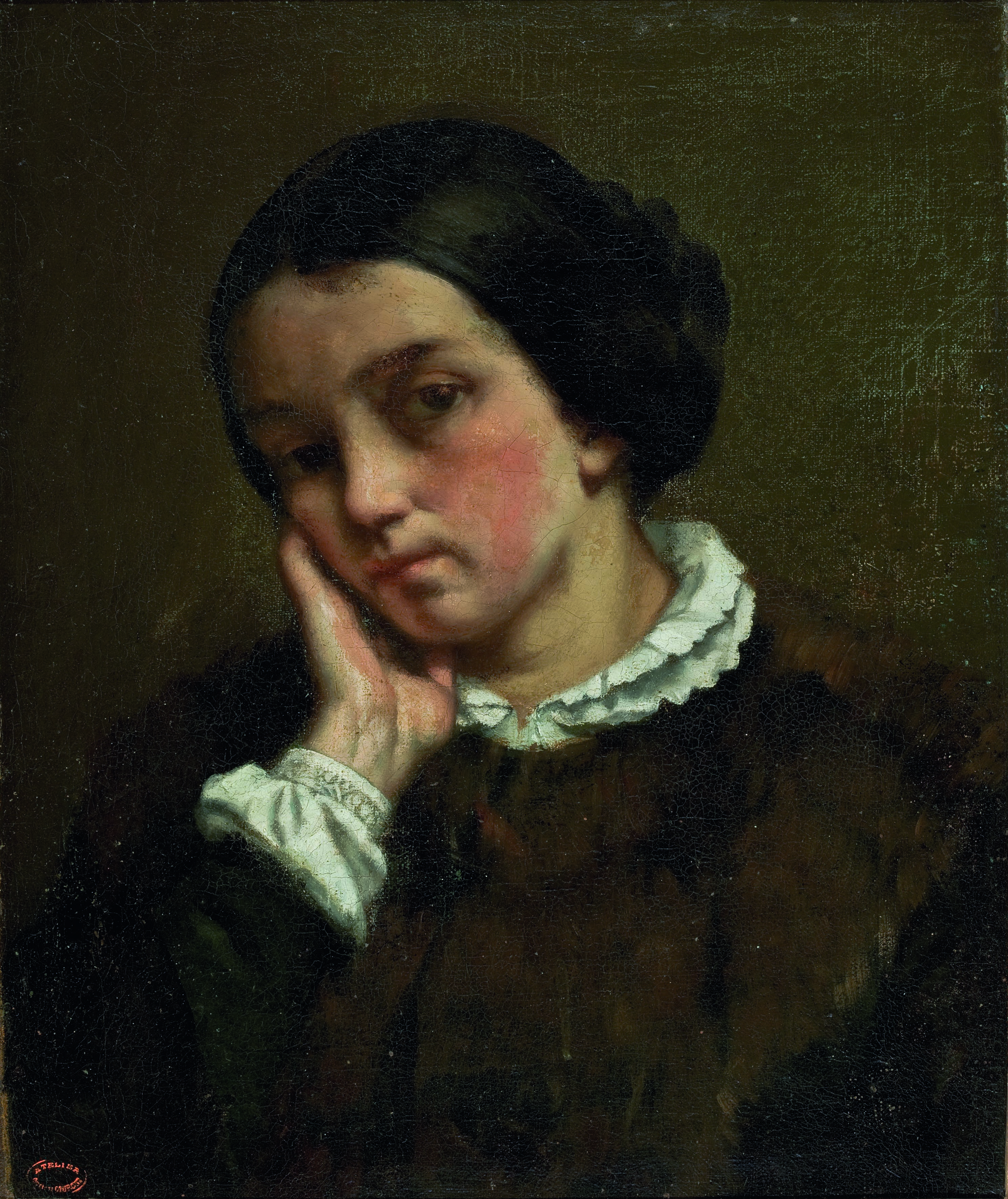
Zélie Courbet, 1847

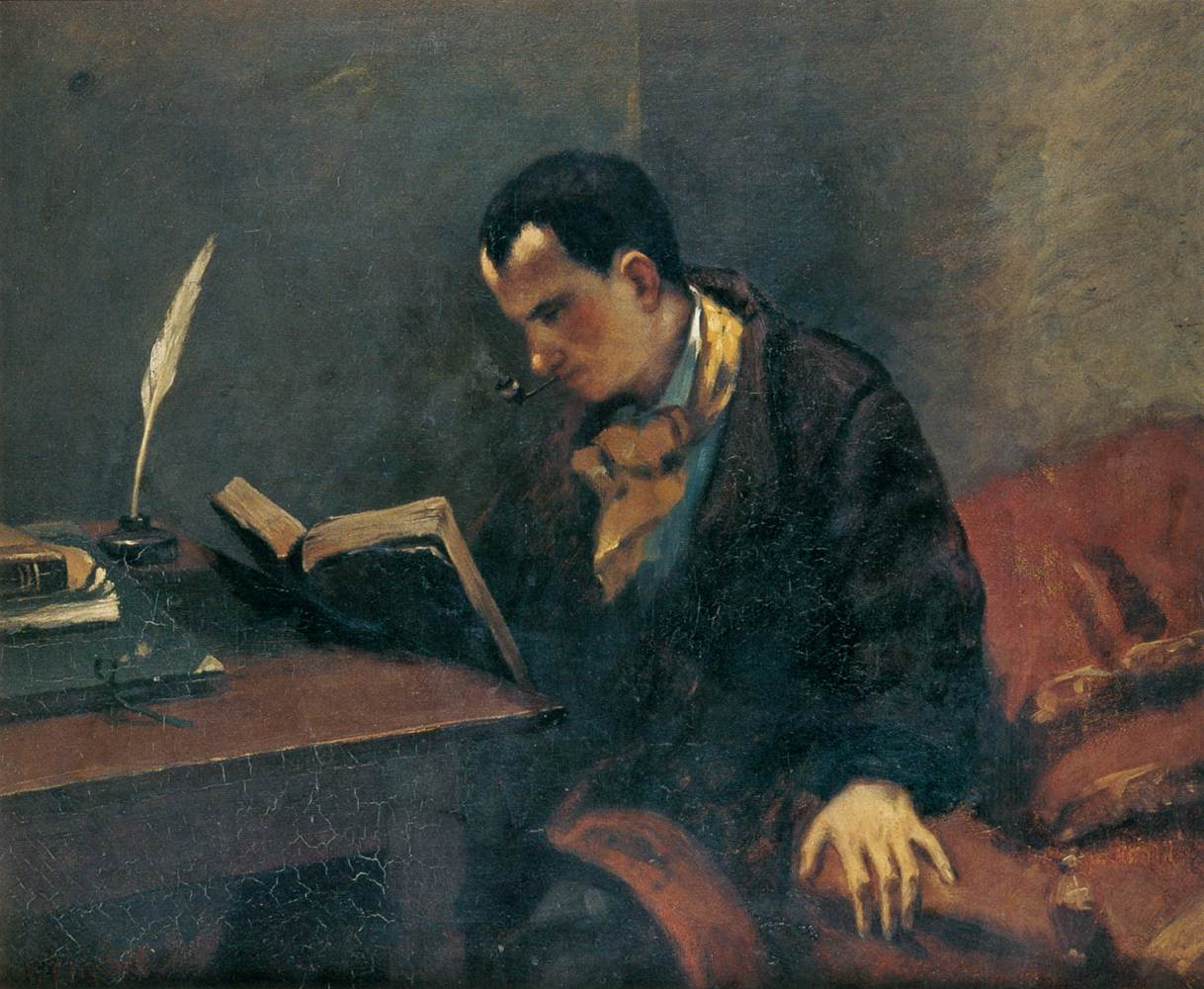
Portrait of Baudelaire, 1848

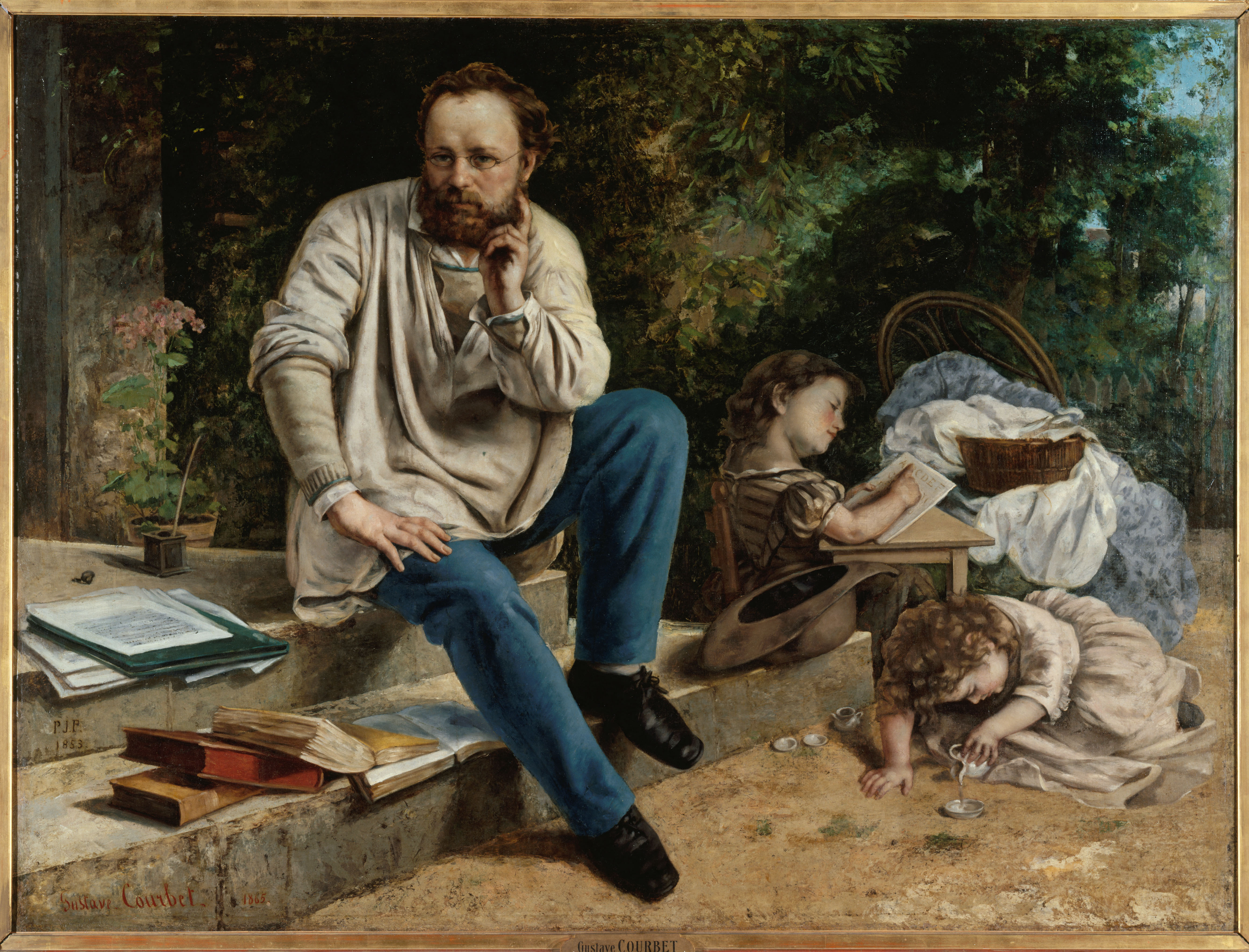
Proudhon and His Children, 1865

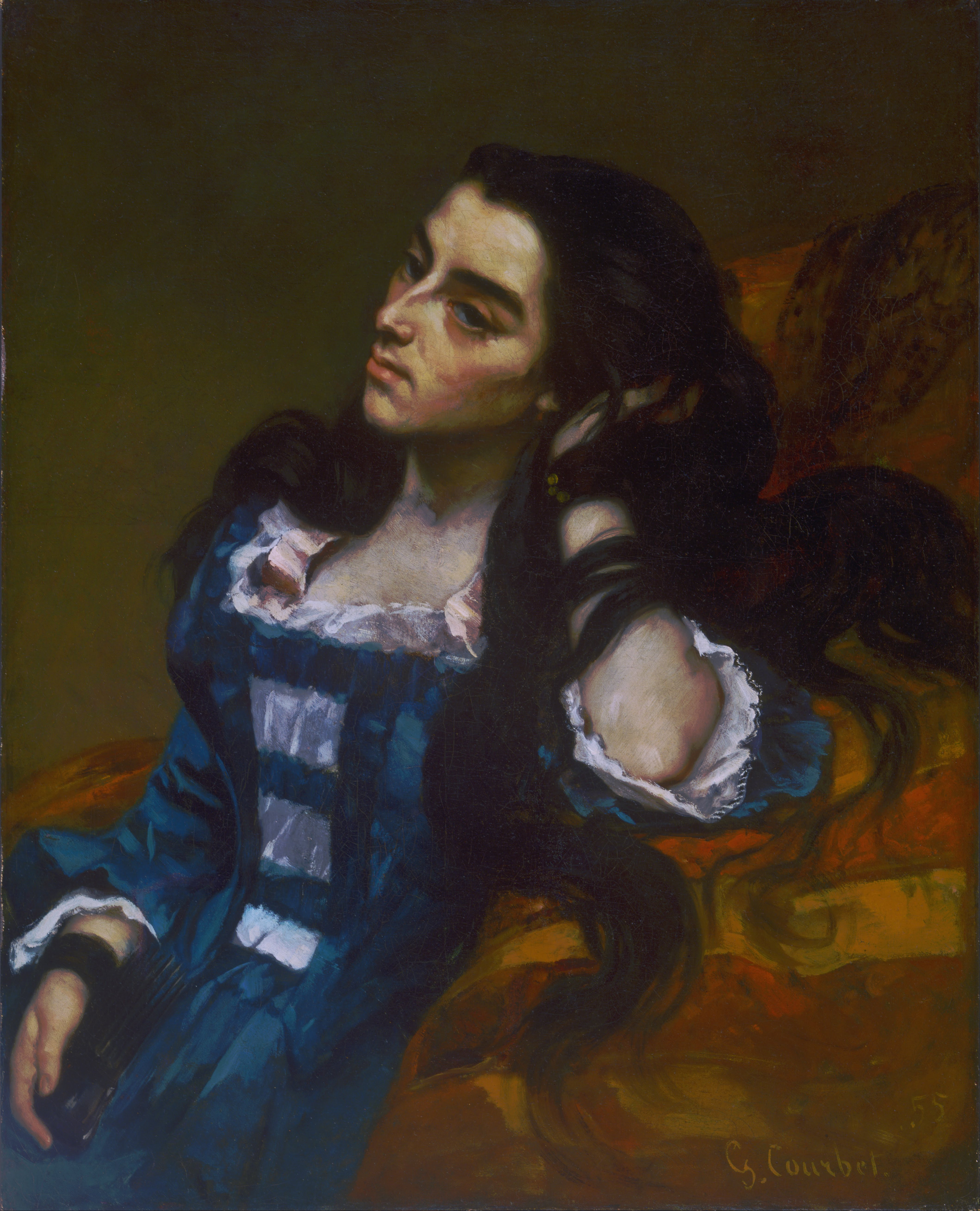
Spanish Woman, 1854

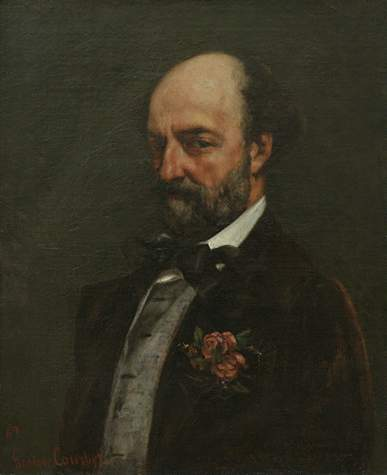
Gustave Mathieu, 1869, Sammlung Oskar Reinhart Am Römerholz, Winterthur
Landscapes

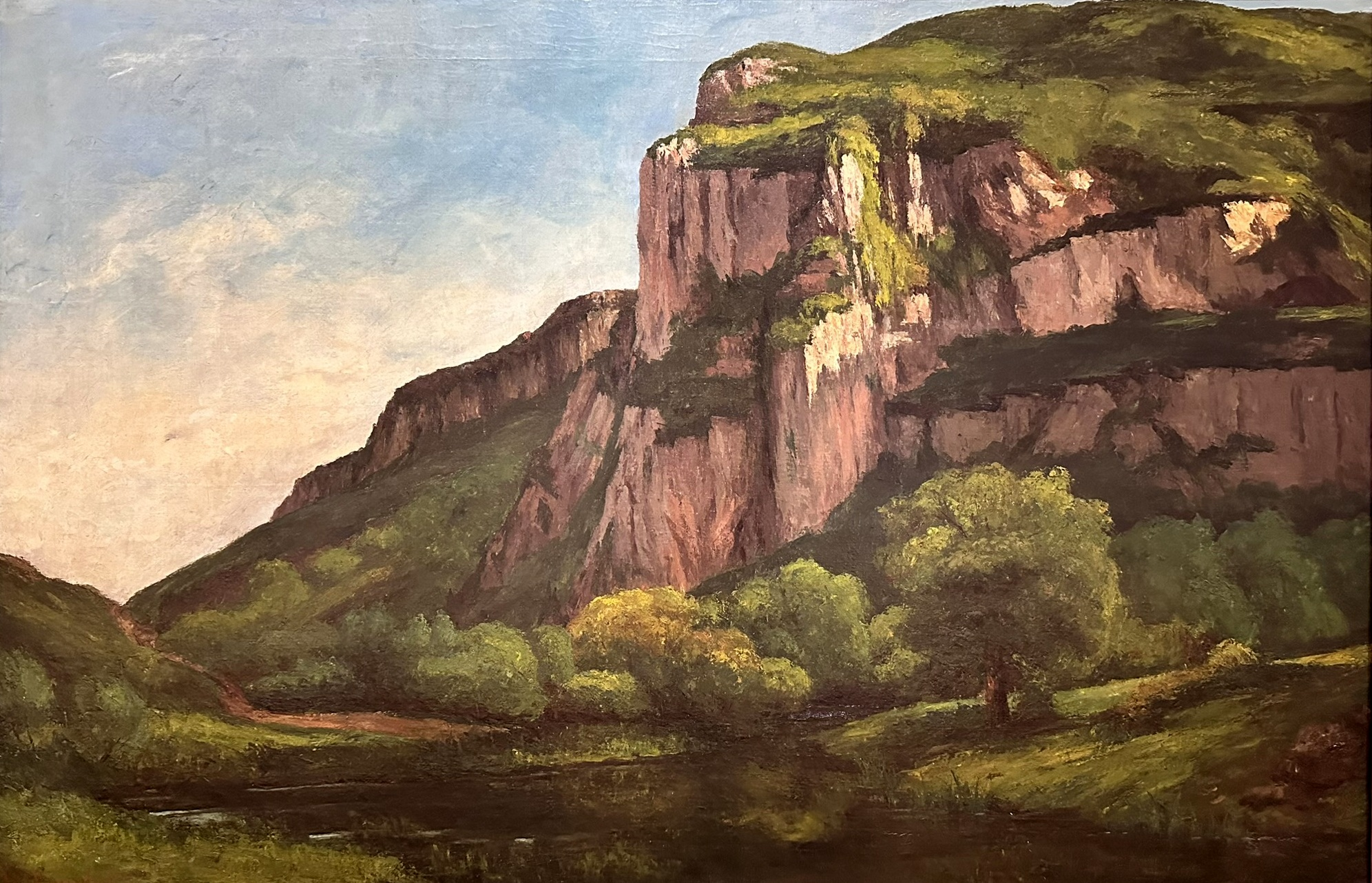
Rocks at Mouthier, 1855

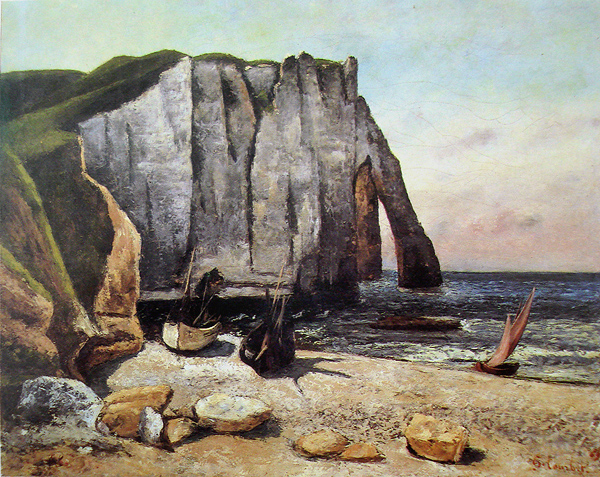
Cliffs at Etretat, After the Storm, 1870

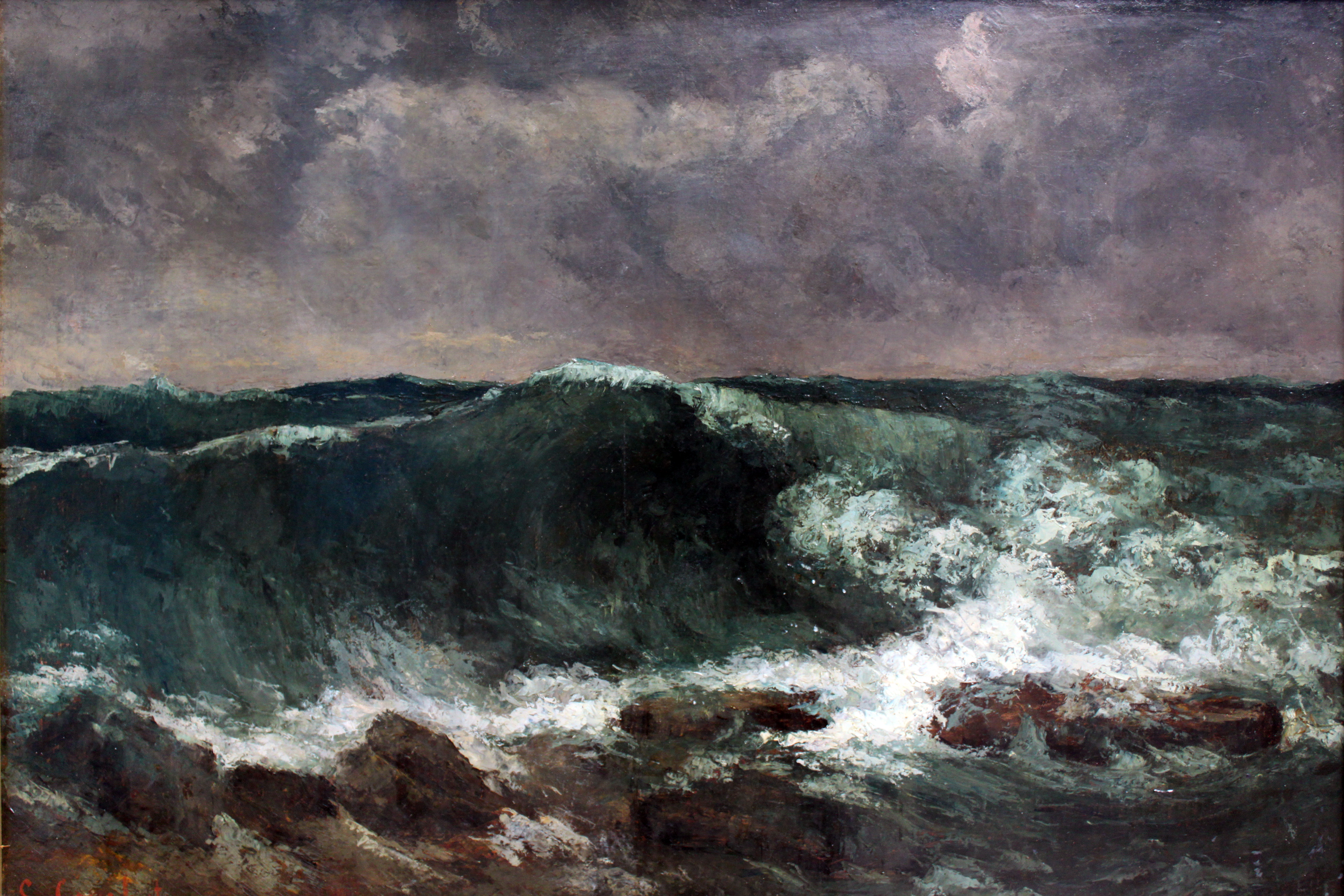
The Wave, 1870

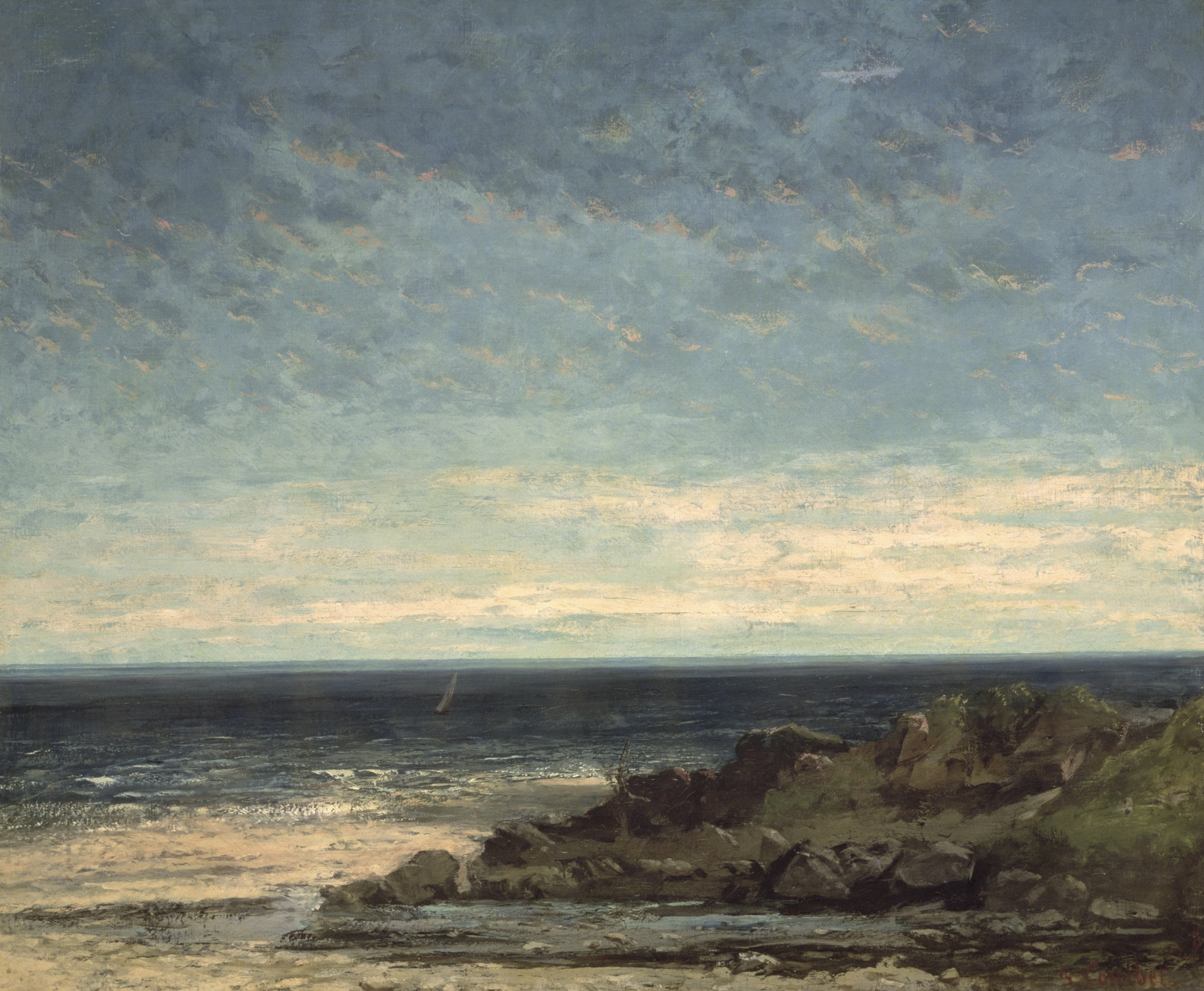
Sea Coast in Normandy, 1867

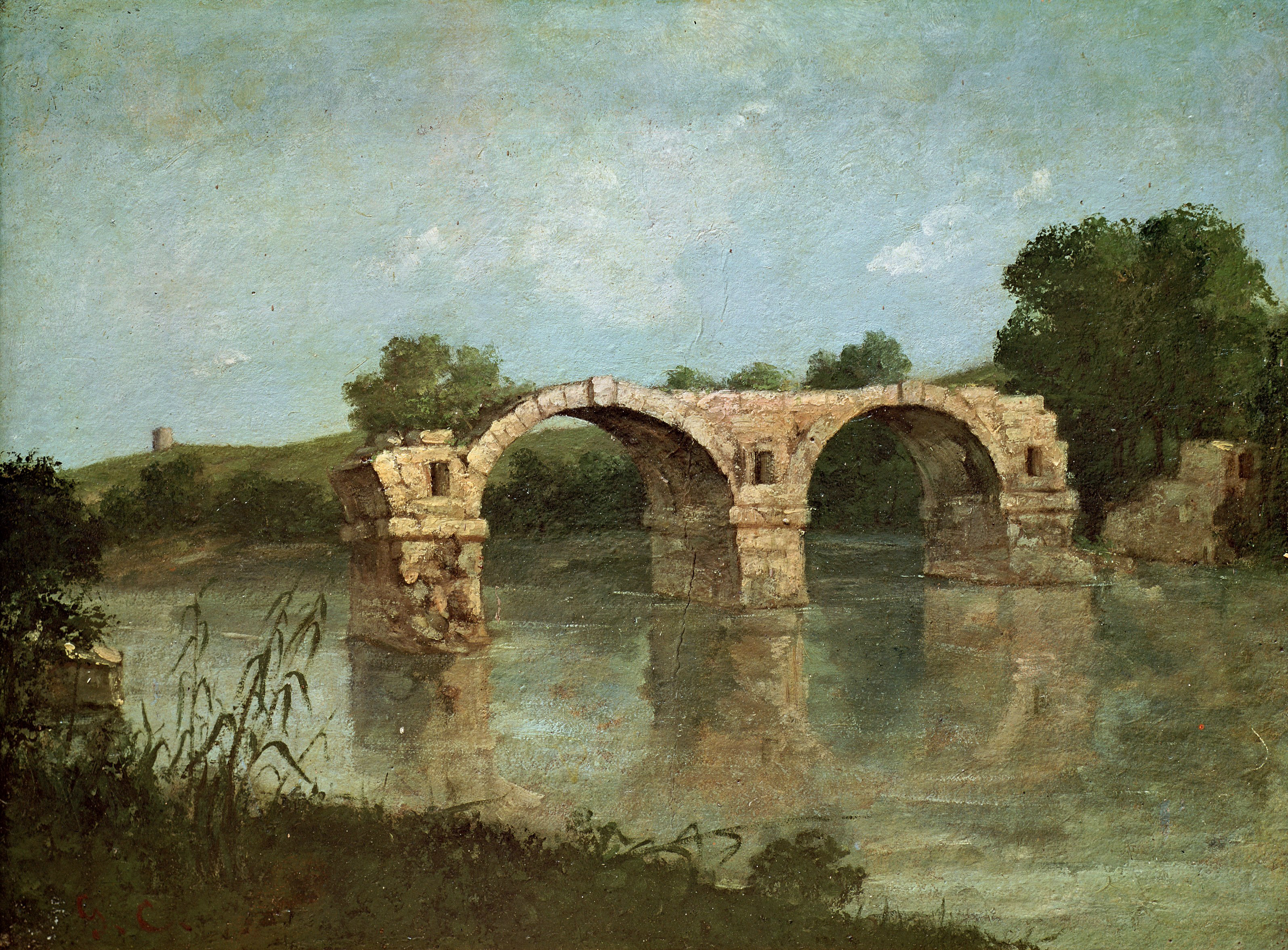
The Pont Ambroix Languedoc, 1857

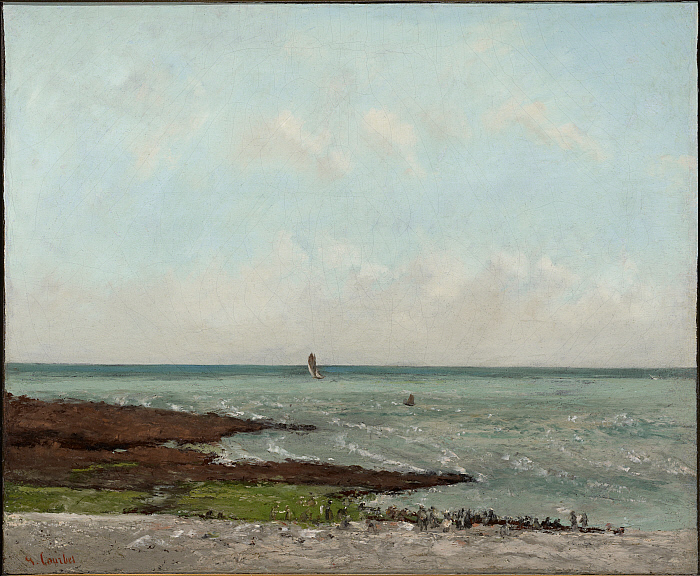
Laundresses at Low Tide, Étretat (1866 or 1869), oil on canvas, 21 3/8 × 25 7/8 in. (54.3 × 65.7 cm), Clark Art Institute

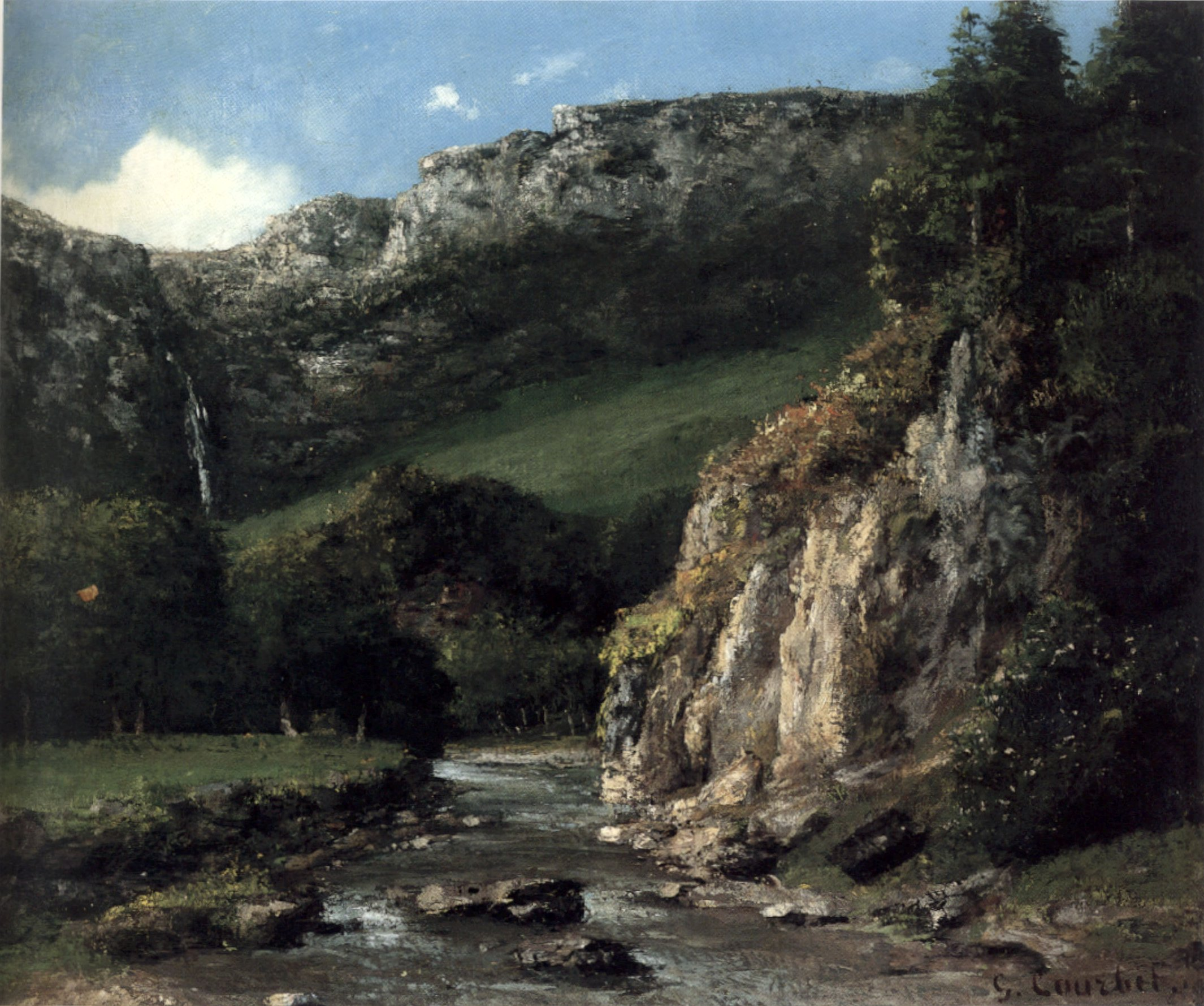
Stream in the Jura Mountains (The Torrent), 1872–73, Honolulu Museum of Art

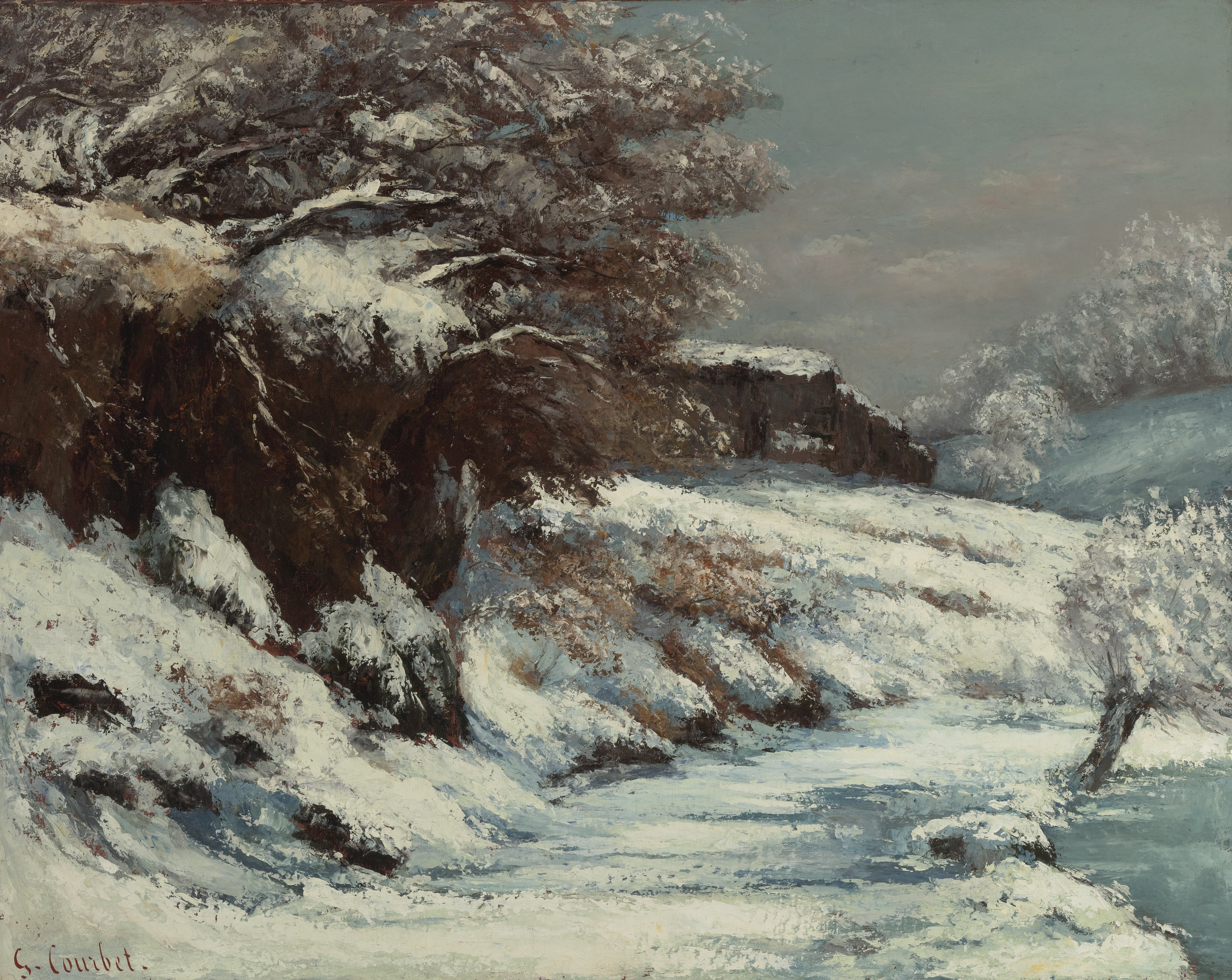
Snow effect, c. 1860s

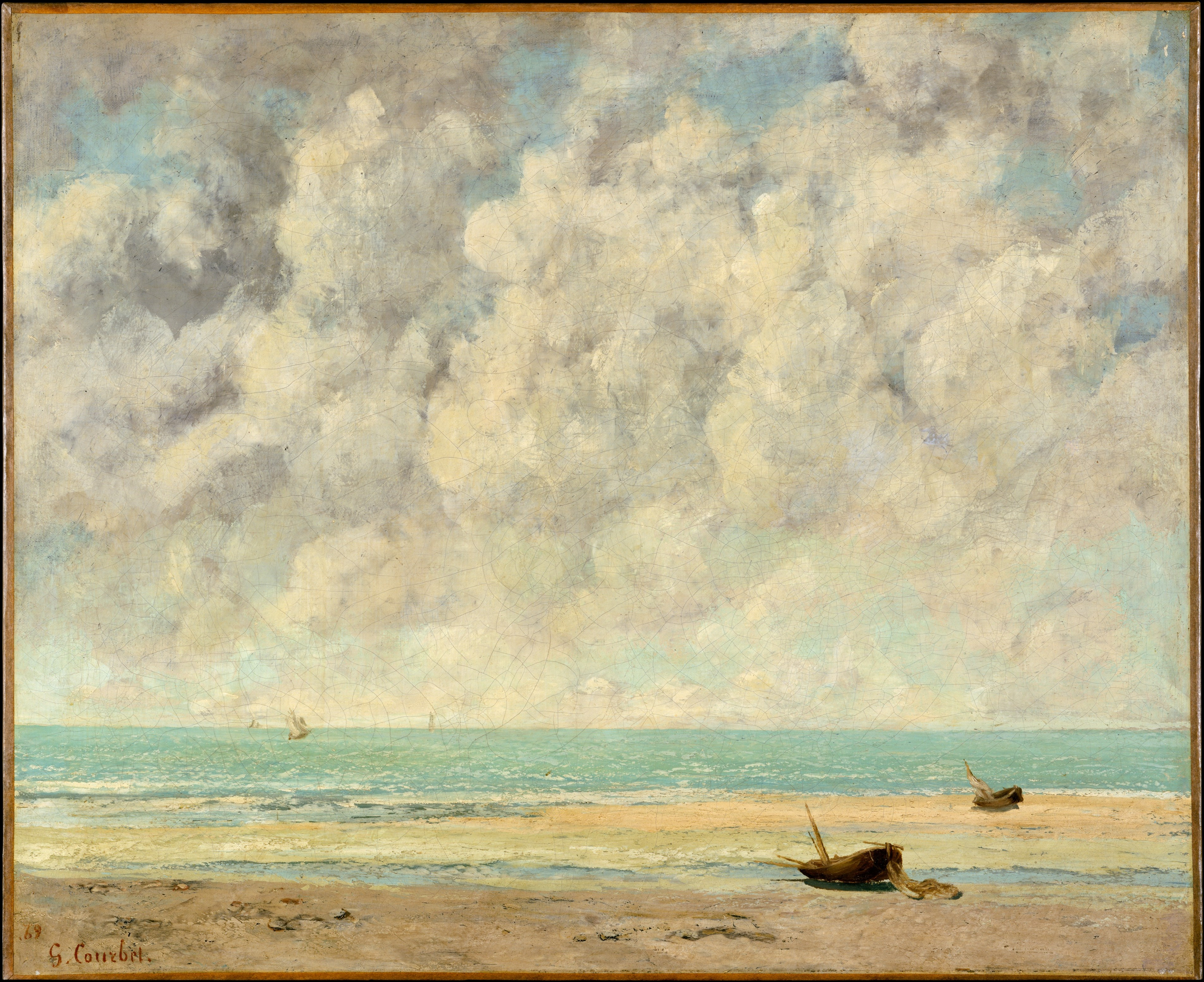
The Calm Sea, 1869, Metropolitan Museum of Art

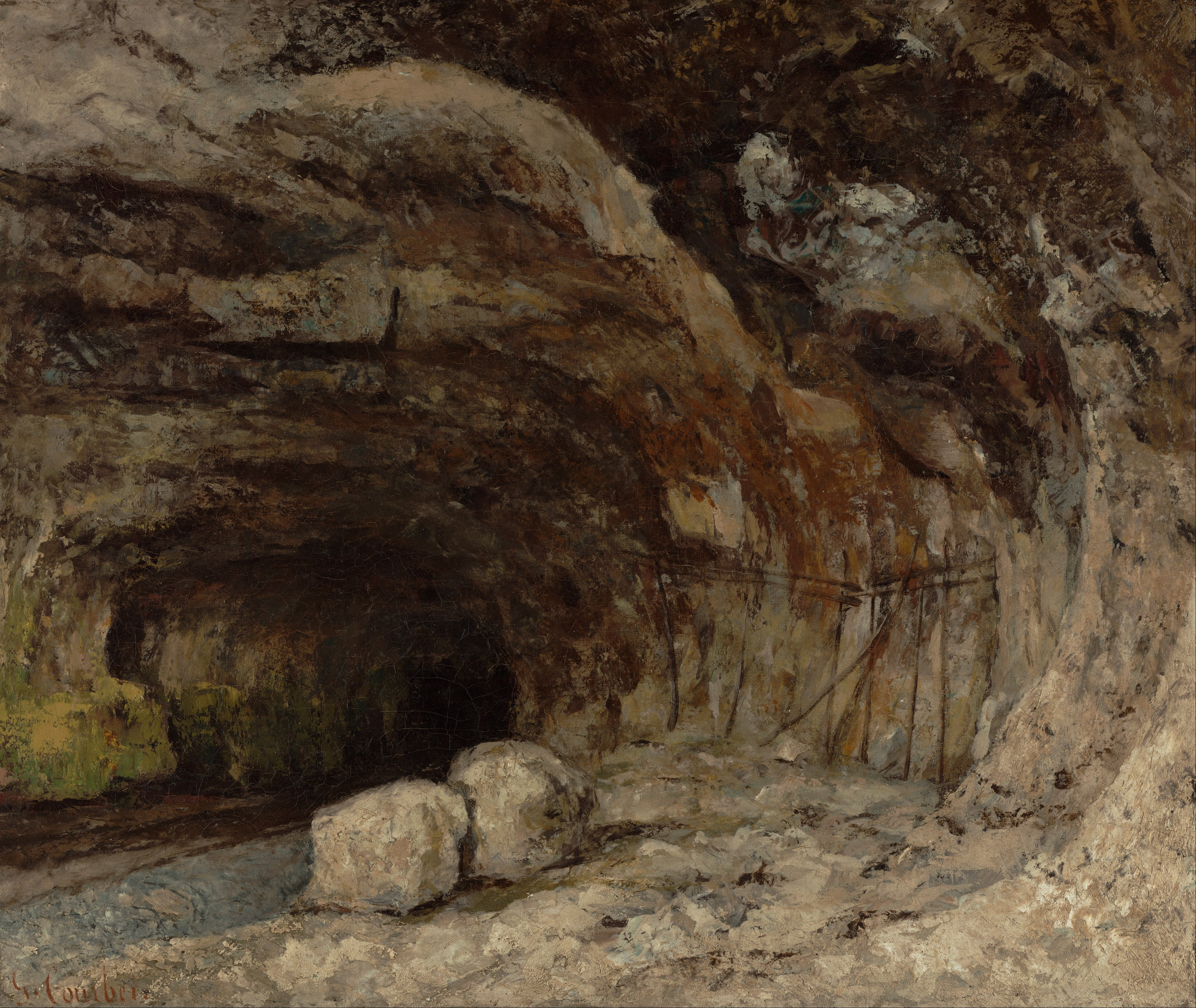
Grotto of Sarrazine near Nans-sous-Sainte-Anne, c. 1875

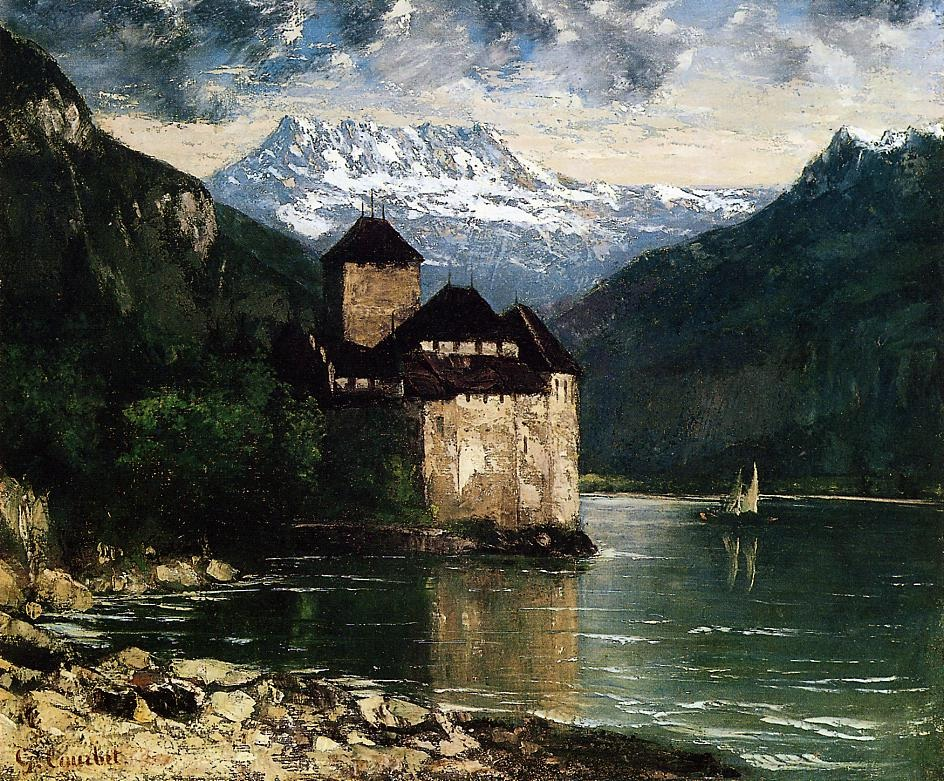
The Castle of Chillon, 1874
Nudes

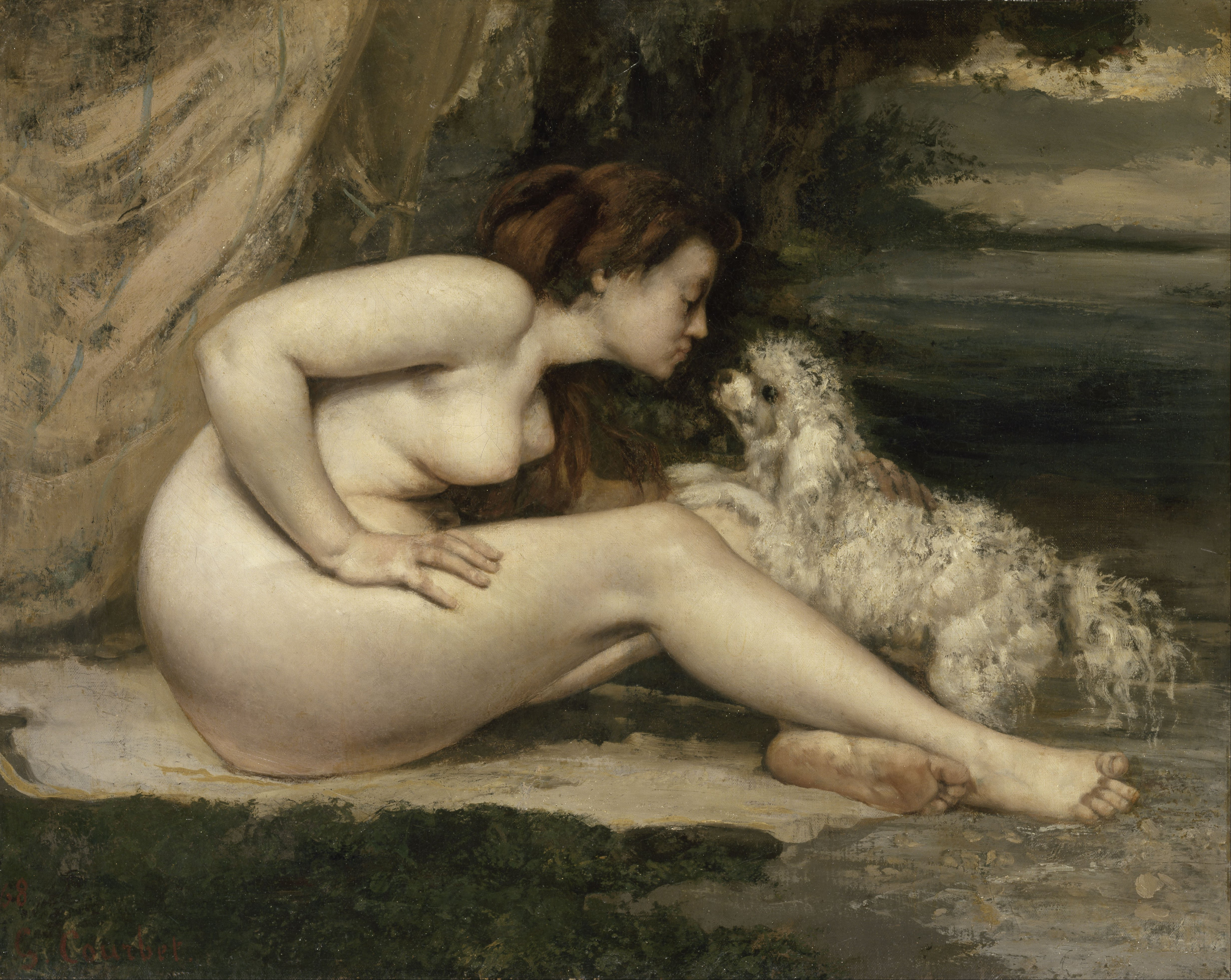
Nude Woman with a Dog (Femme nue au chien)), c. 1861–62, Musée d'Orsay, Paris

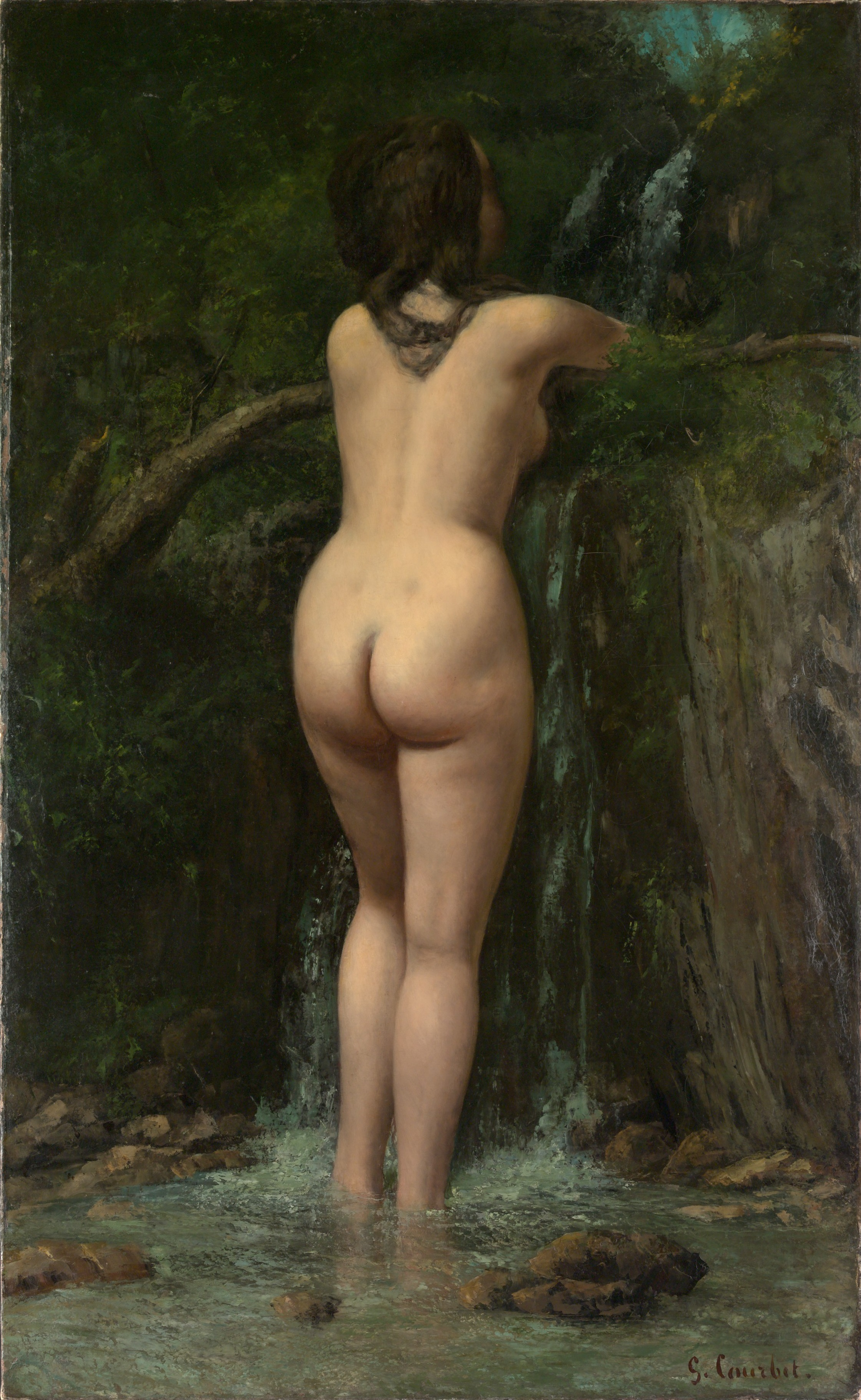
La Font (The Source), 1862, Metropolitan Museum of Art

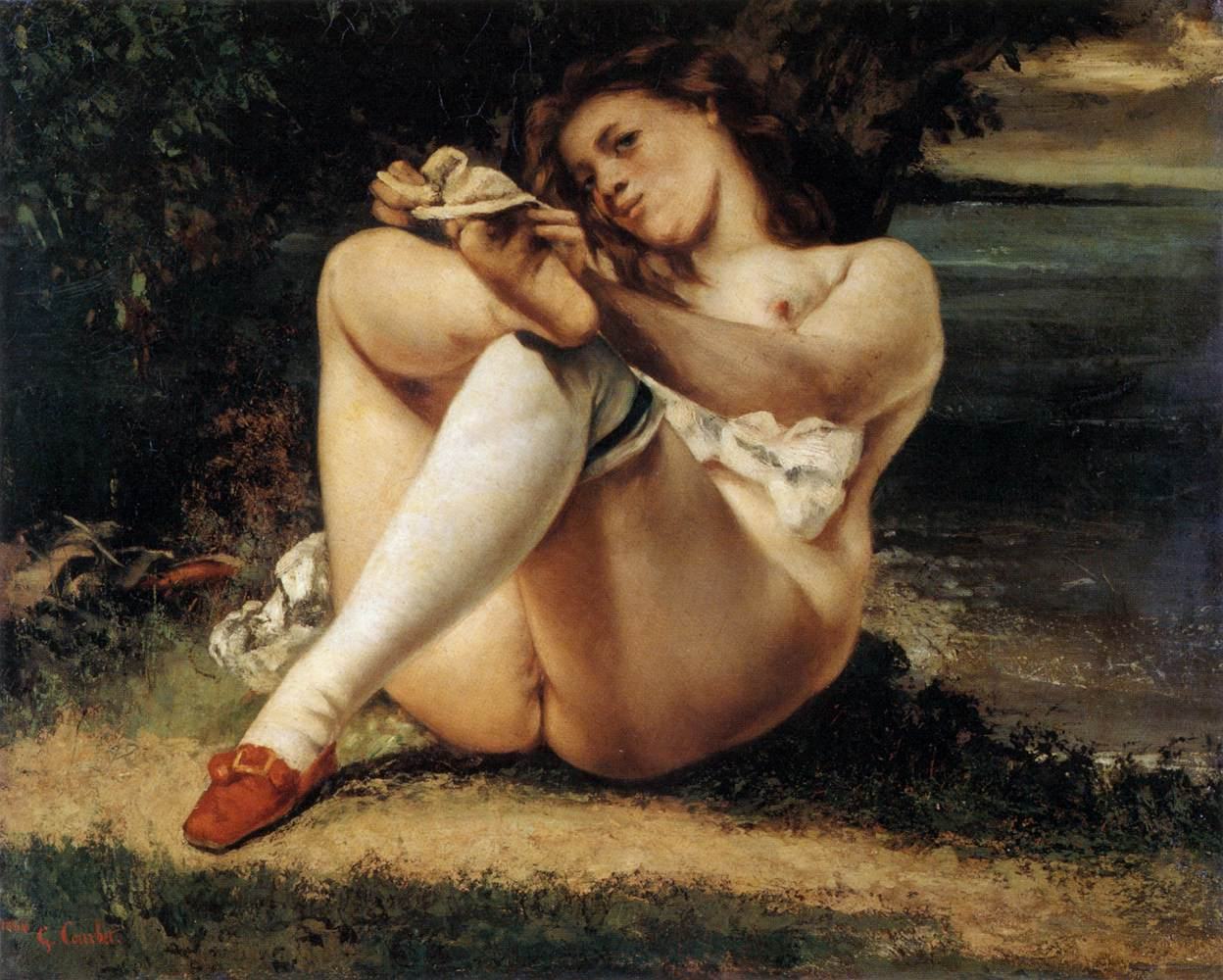
Les Bas Blancs (Woman with White Stockings), 1864, Barnes Foundation

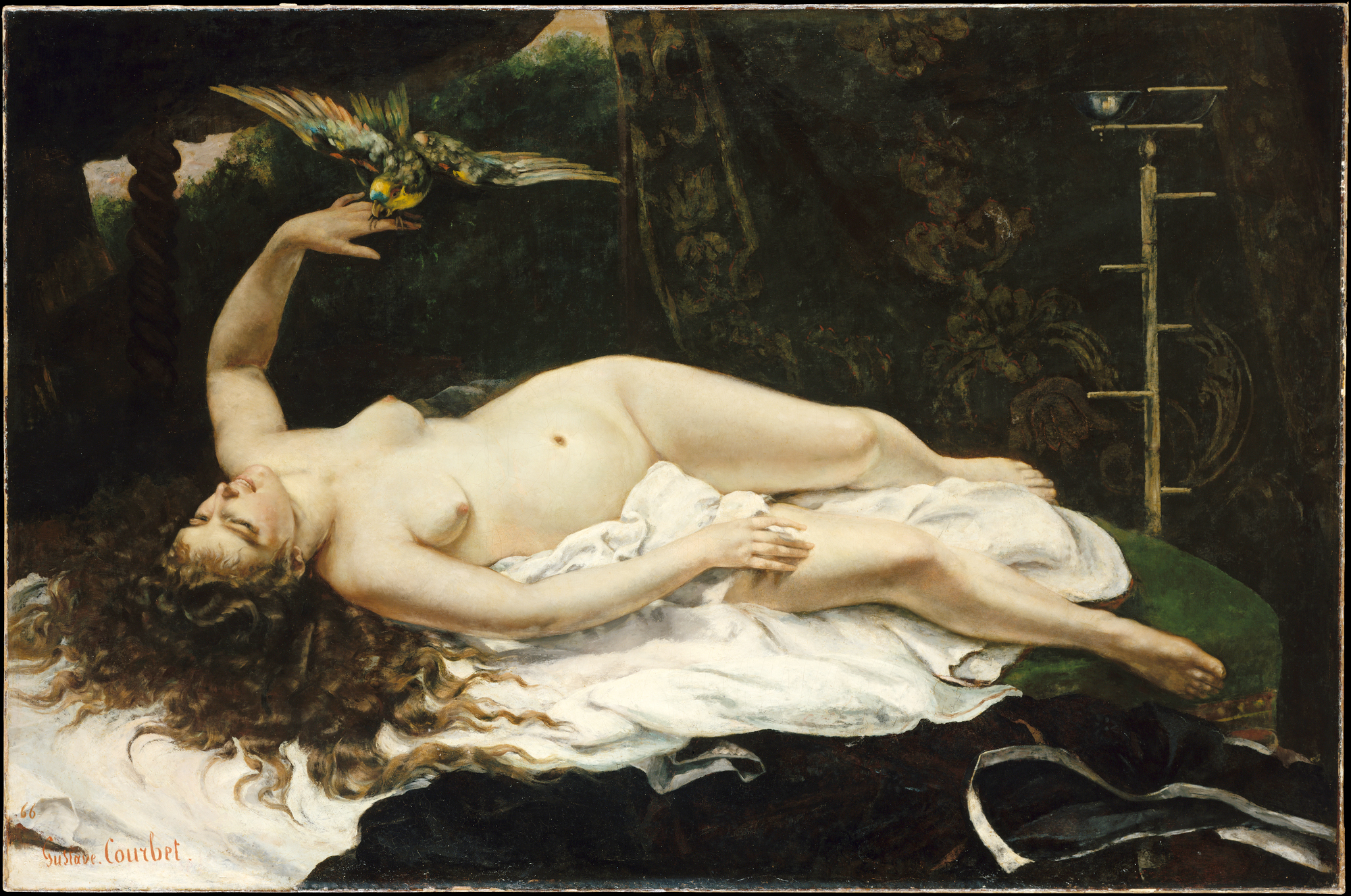
Woman with a Parrot, 1866, Metropolitan Museum of Art, New York

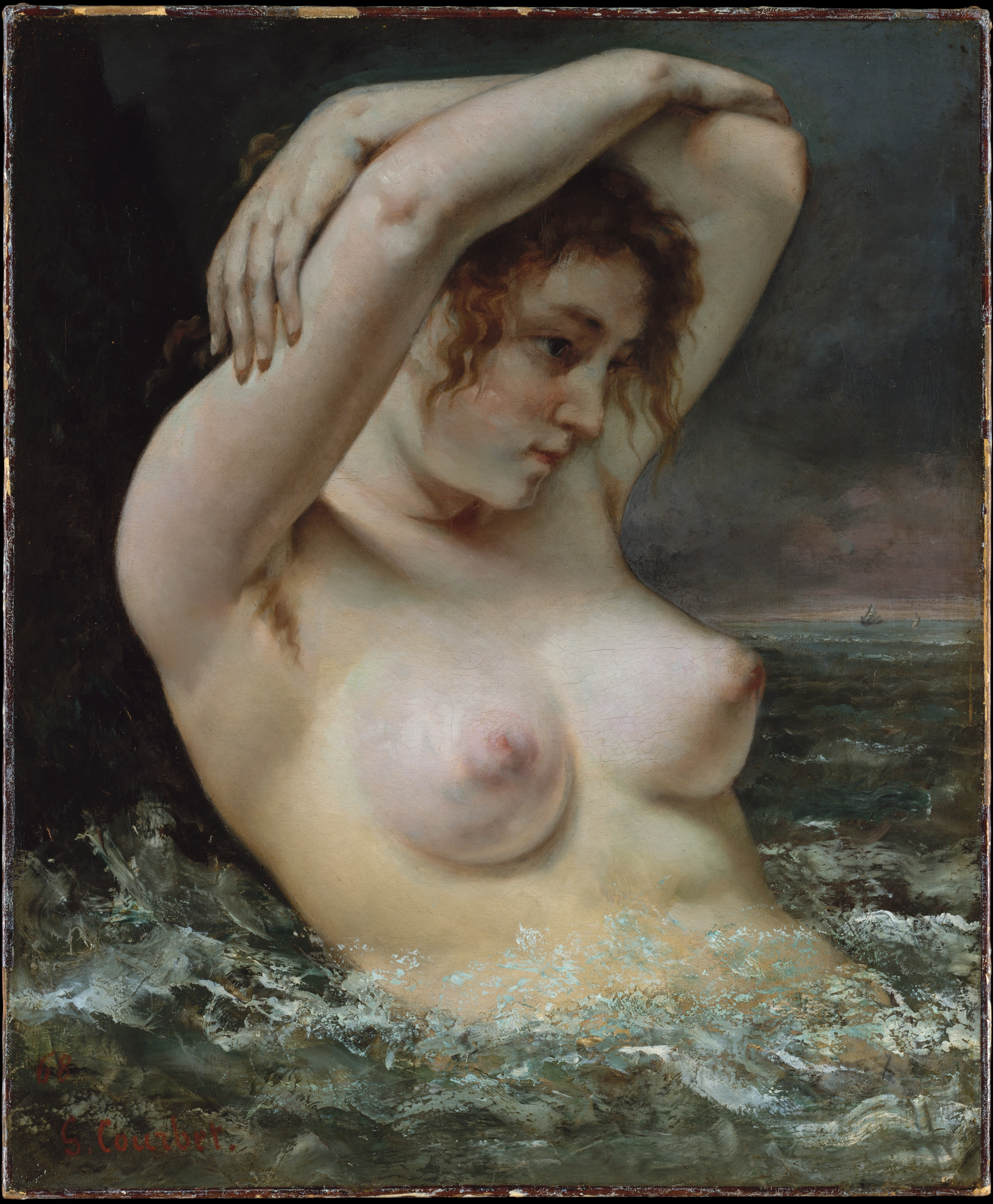
The Woman in the Waves, 1868, Metropolitan Museum of Art, New York

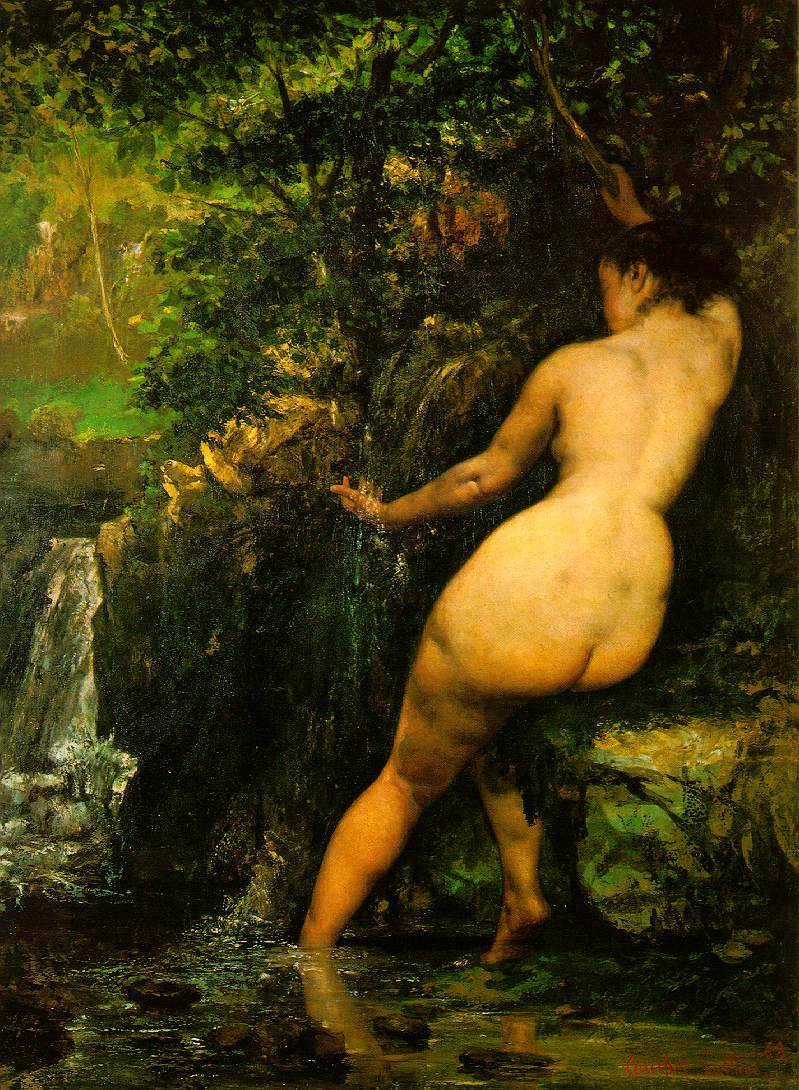
The Source, 1868, Musée d'Orsay
Other

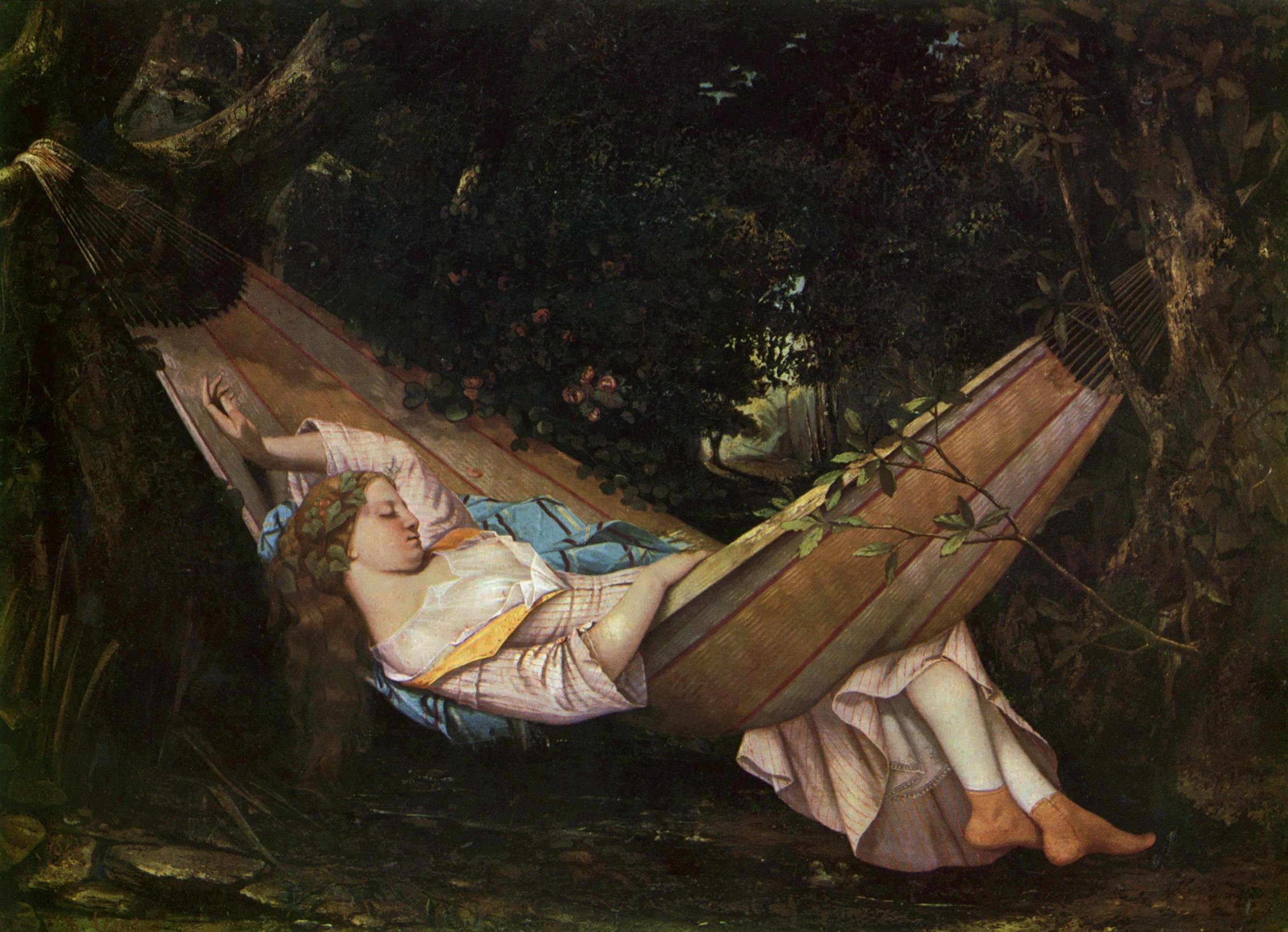
The Hammock, 1844

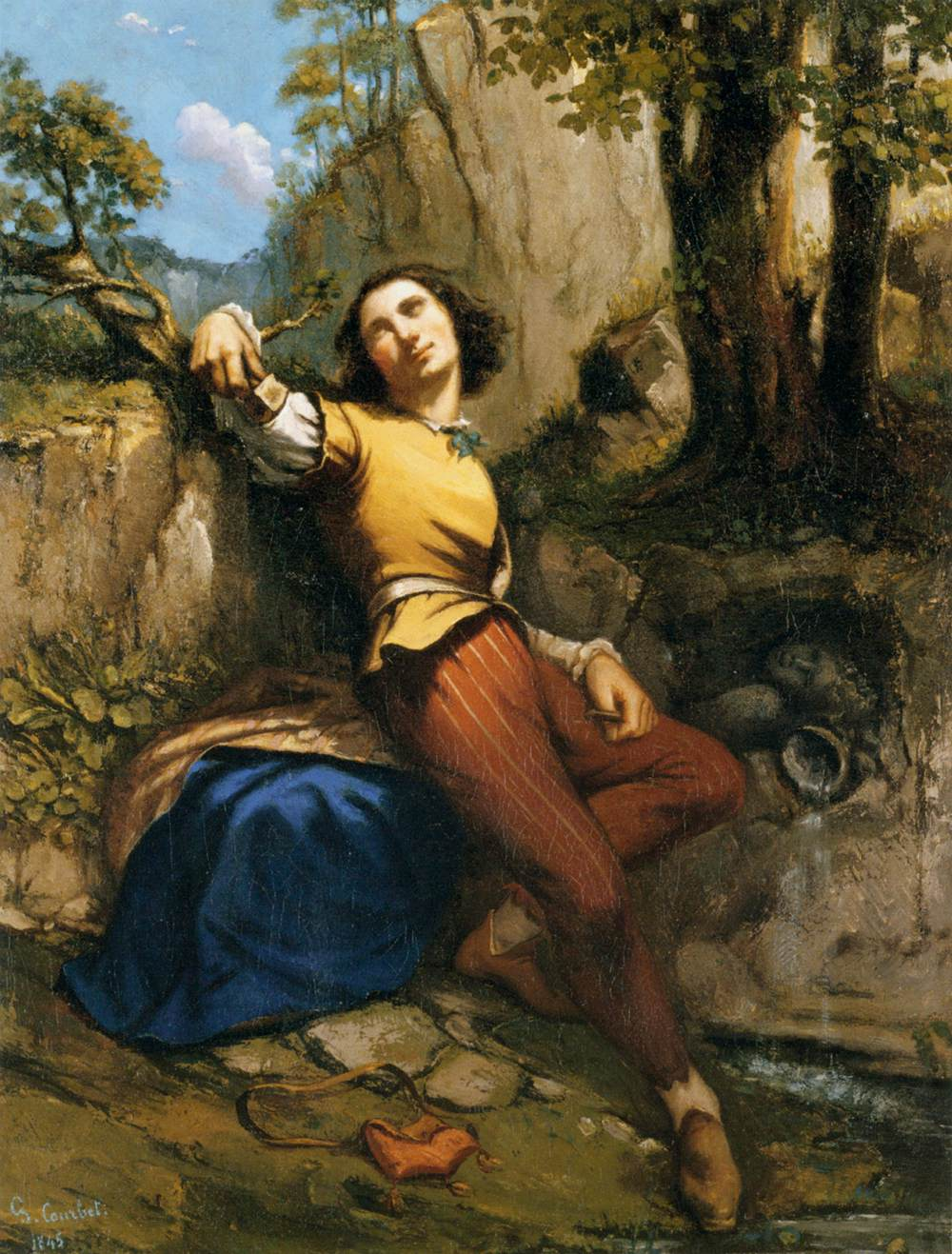
The Sculptor, 1845

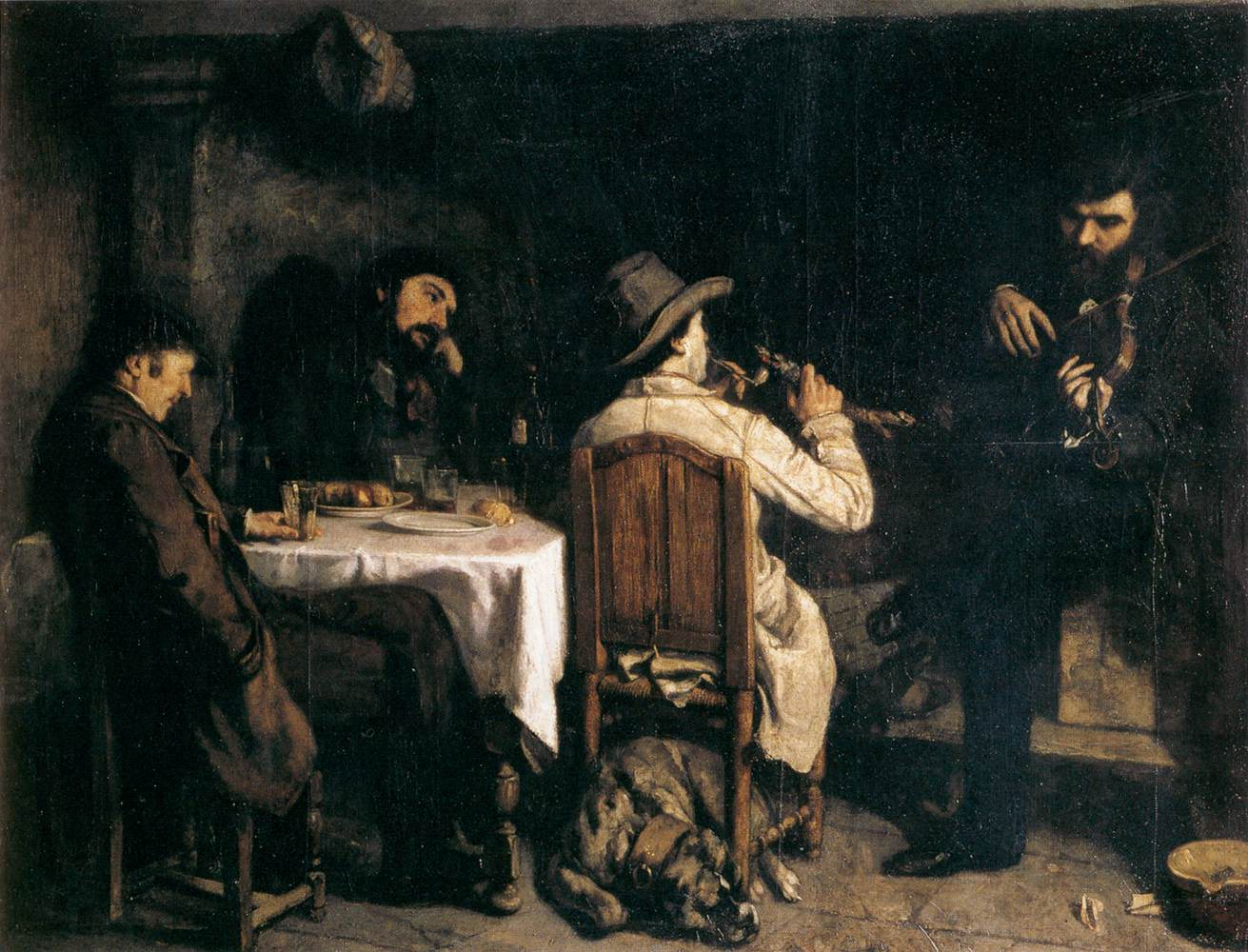
After Dinner at Ornans, 1849

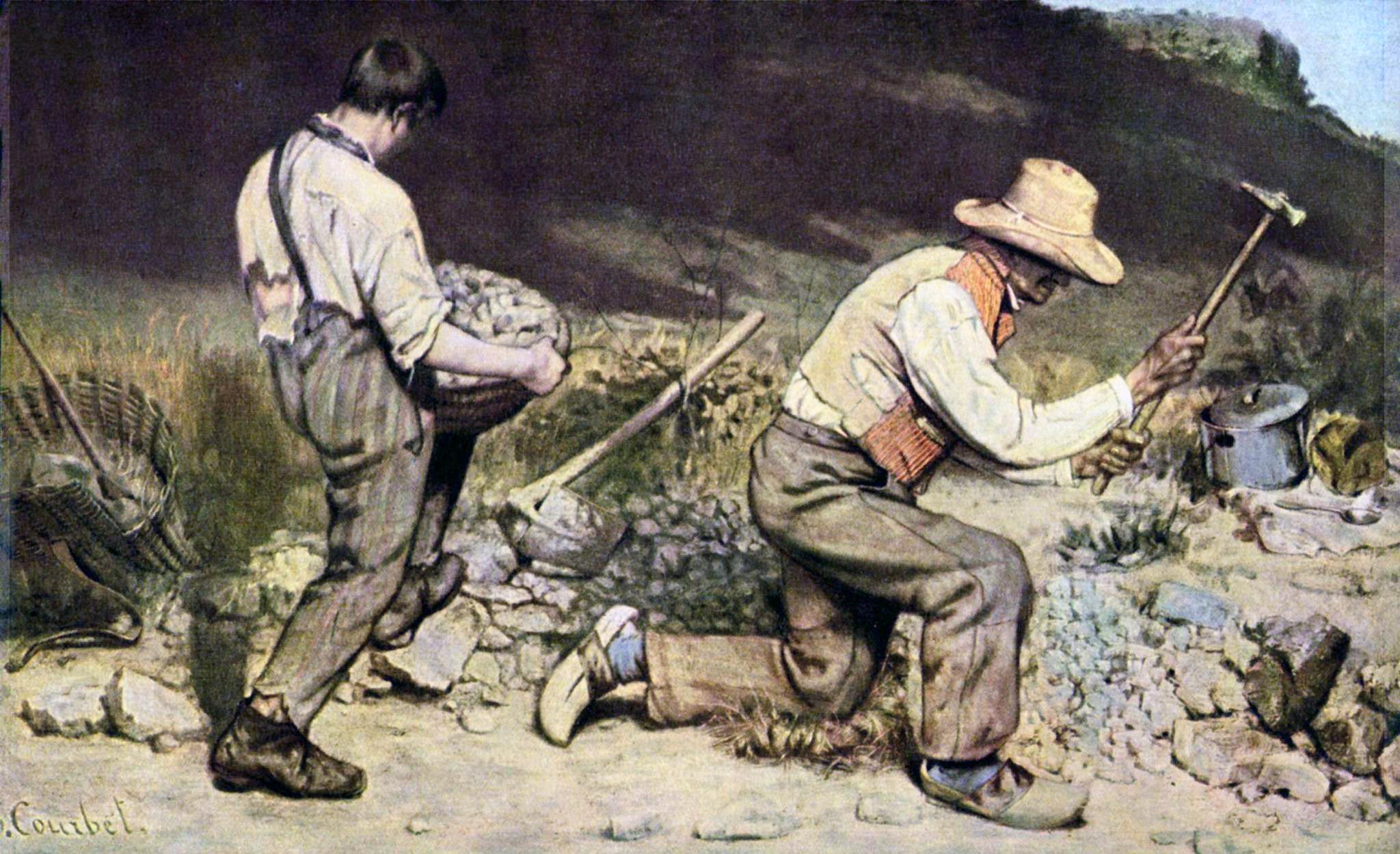
The Stone Breakers, 1849

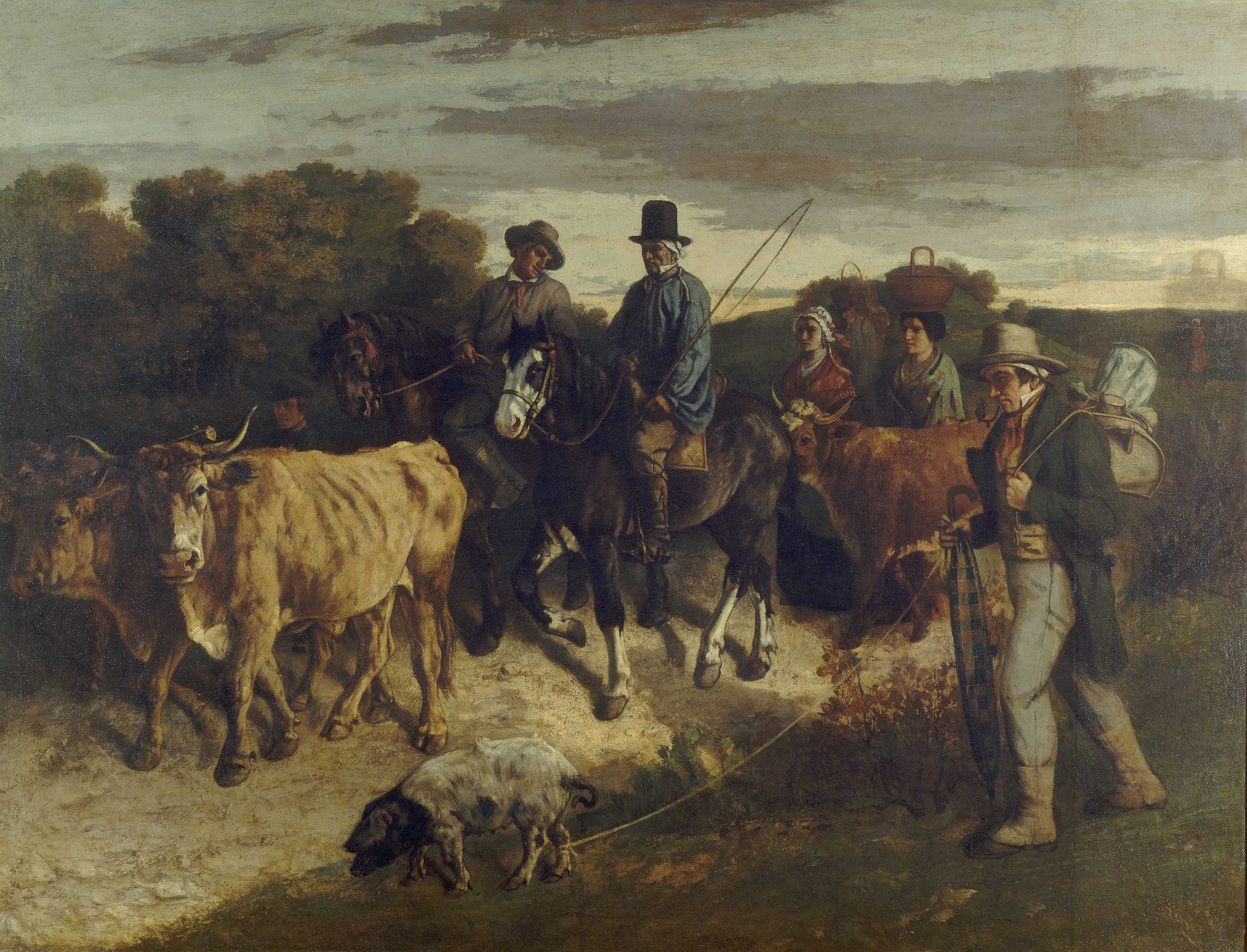
Farmers of Flagey on the Return From the Market, 1850, Museum of Art, Besançon

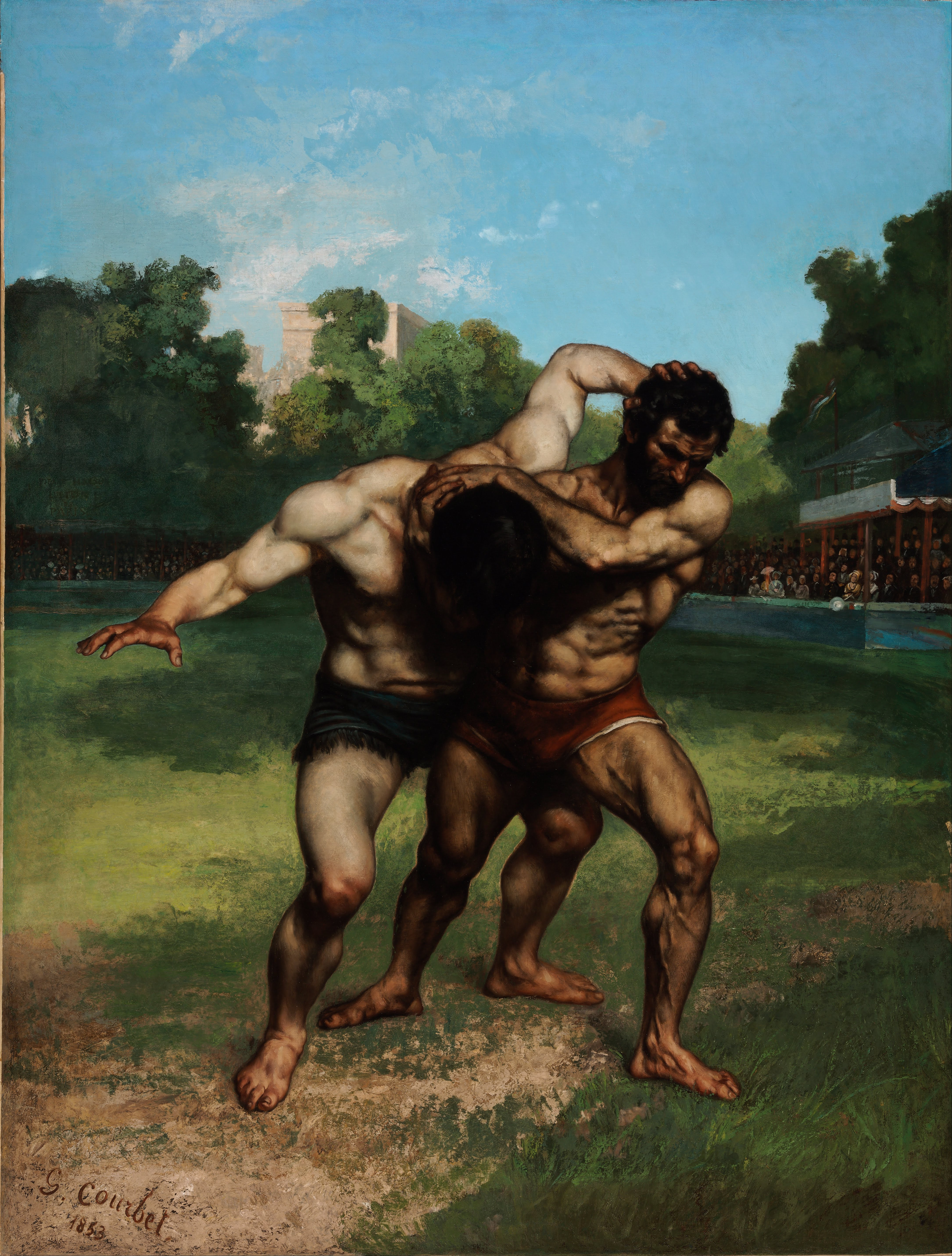
The Wrestlers, 1853, Museum of Fine Arts, Budapest

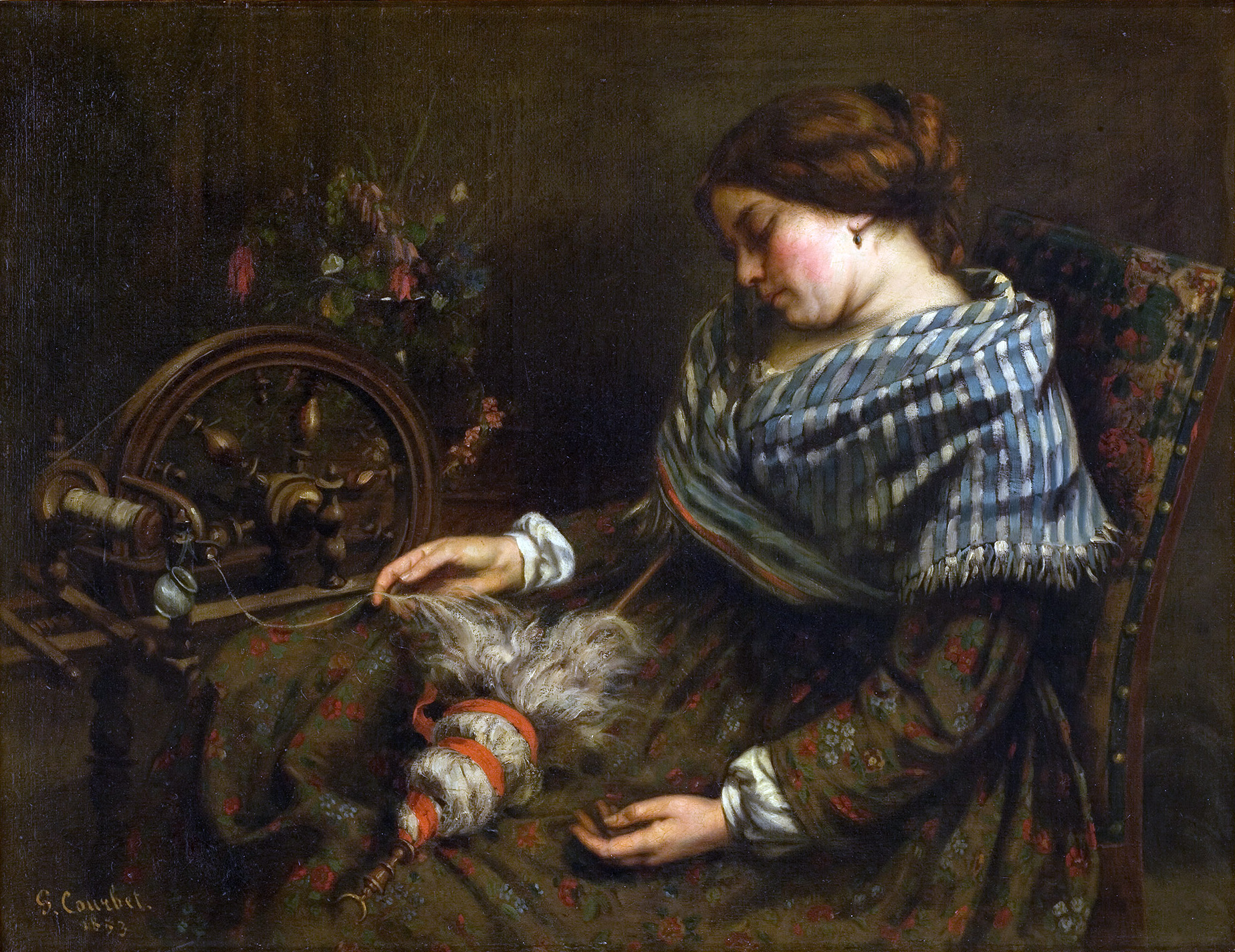
The Sleeping Spinner, 1853

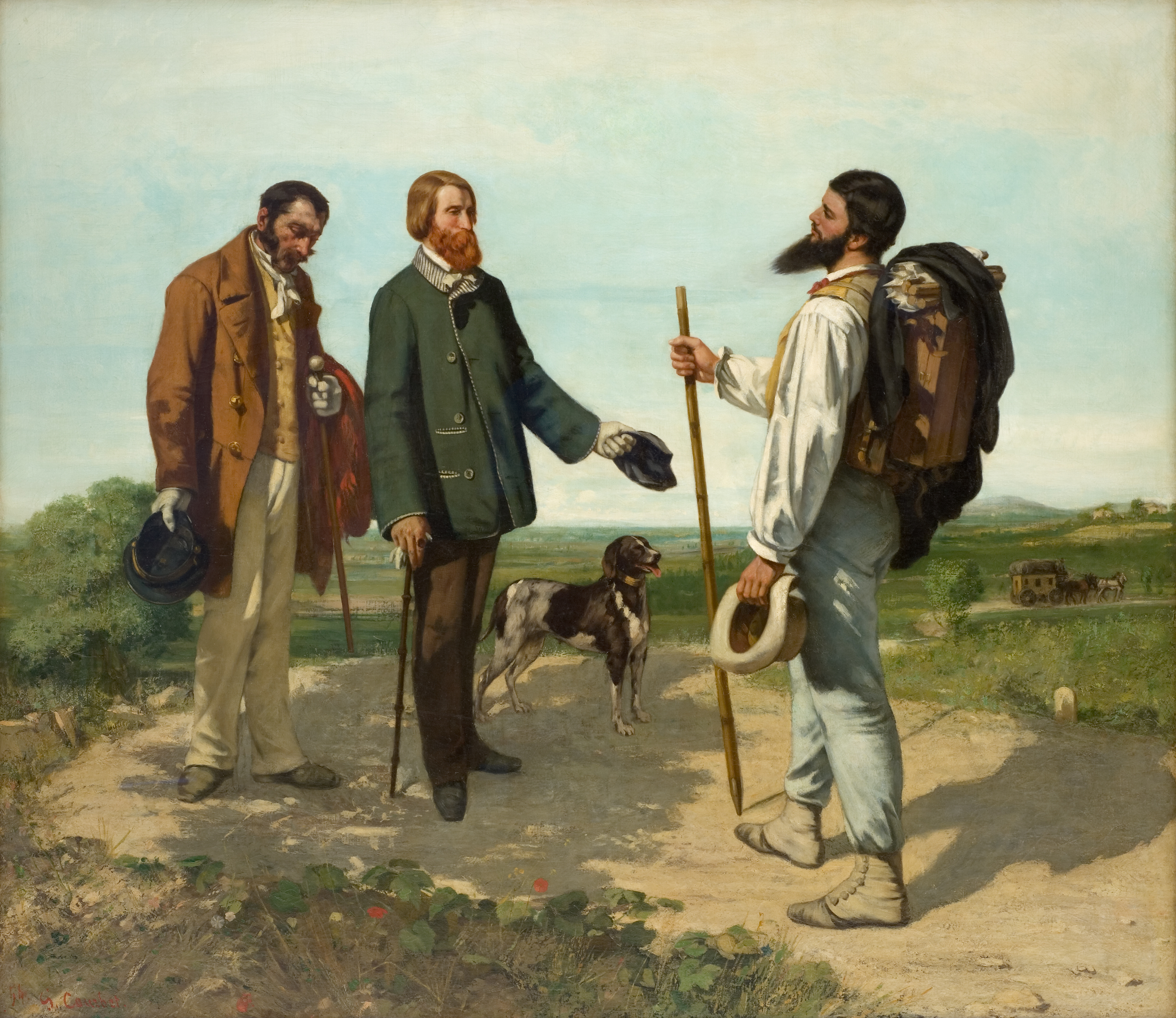
The Meeting ("Bonjour, Monsieur Courbet"), 1854, Musée Fabre, Montpellier

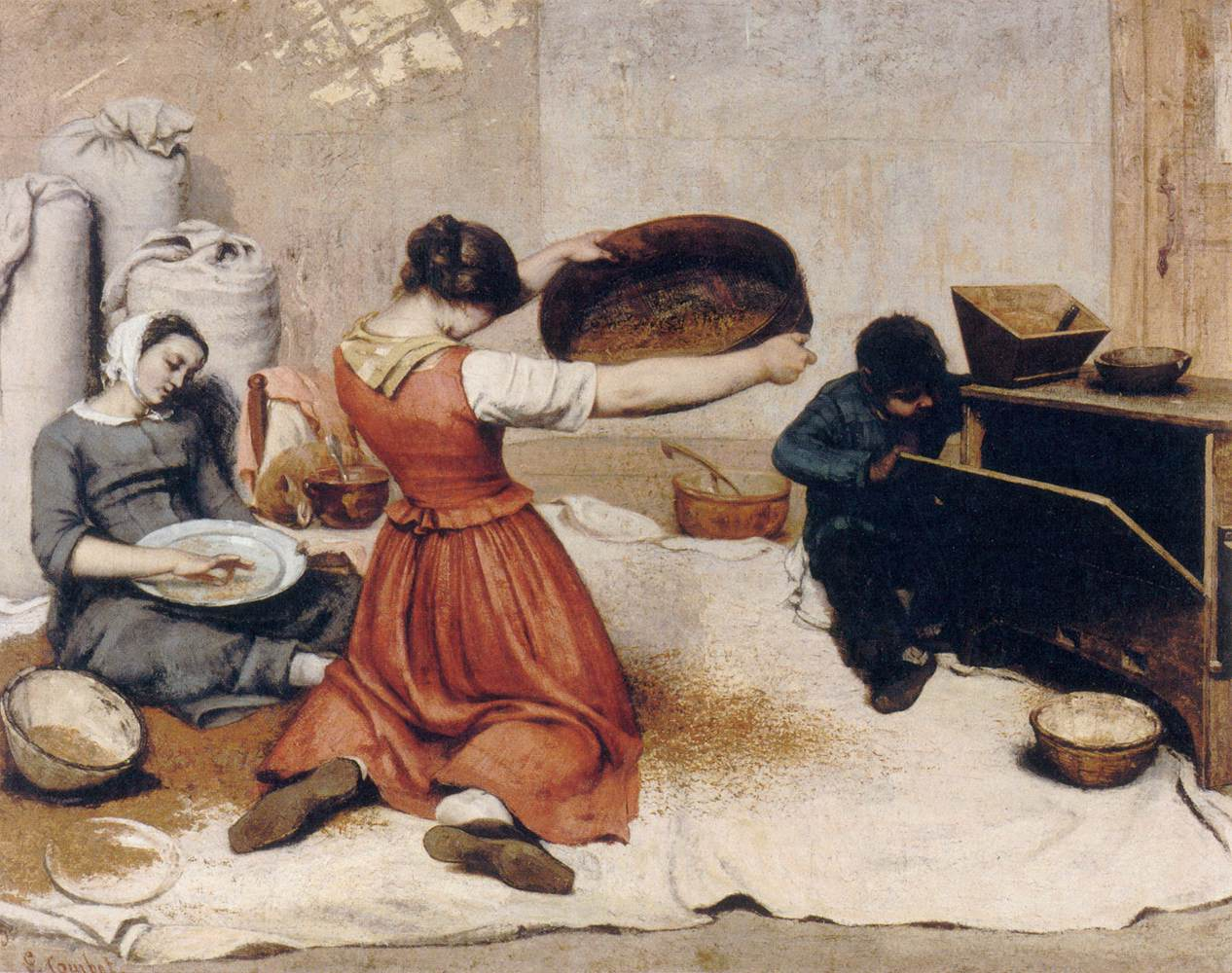
The Wheat Sifters (Les Cribleuses de blé), 1854

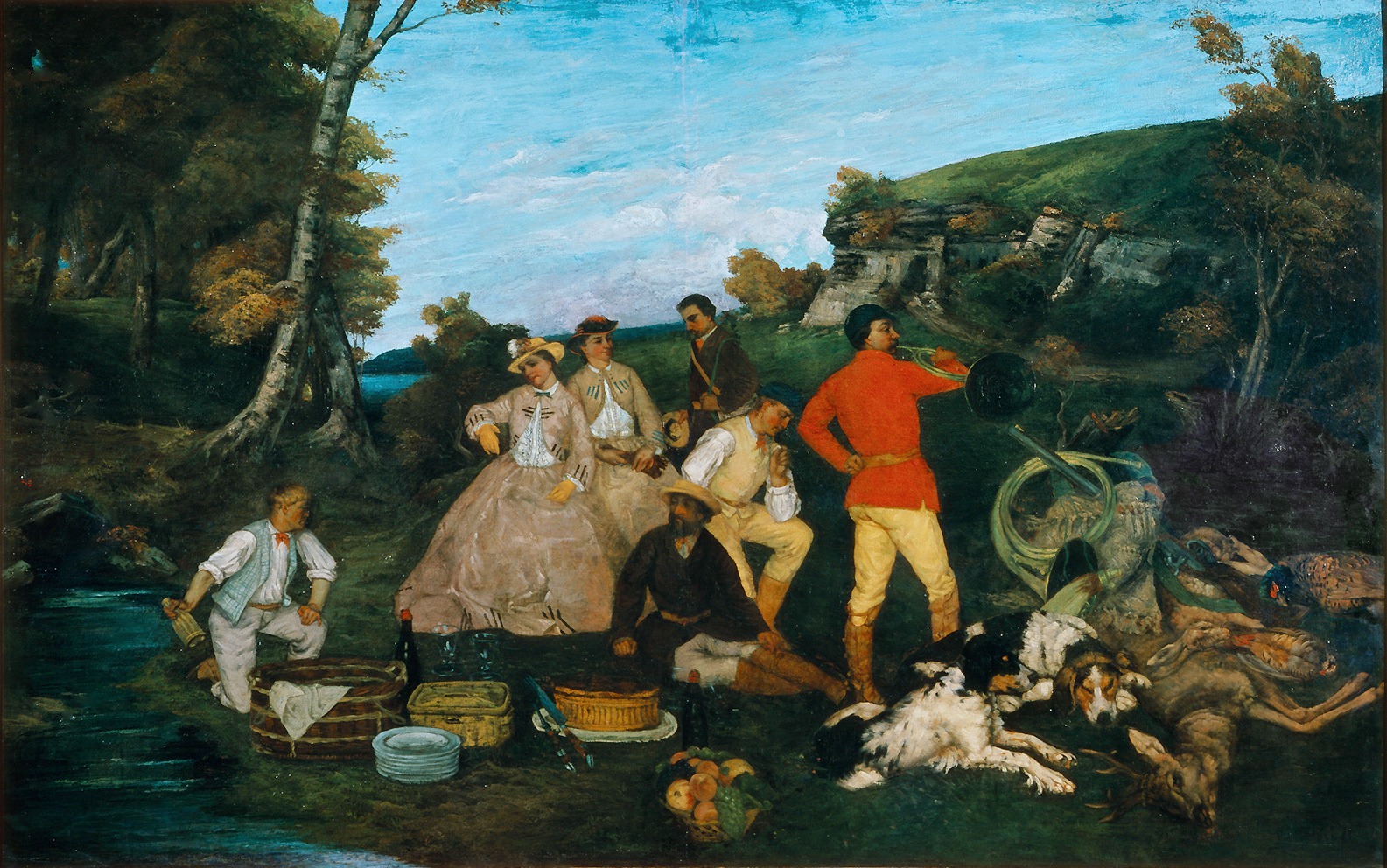
The Hunt Breakfast, 1858, Wallraf–Richartz Museum, Cologne

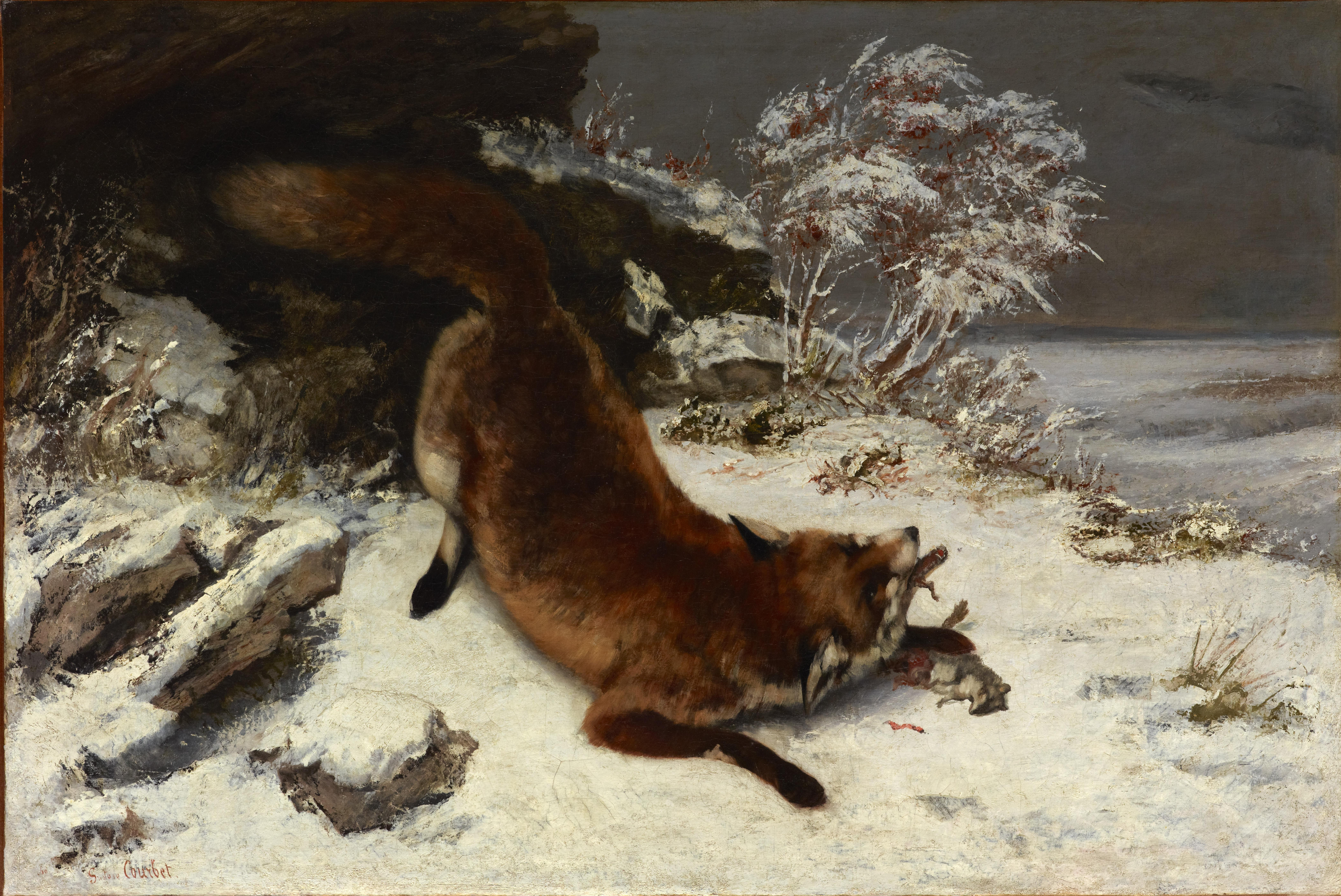
Fox in the Snow, 1860, Dallas Museum of Art

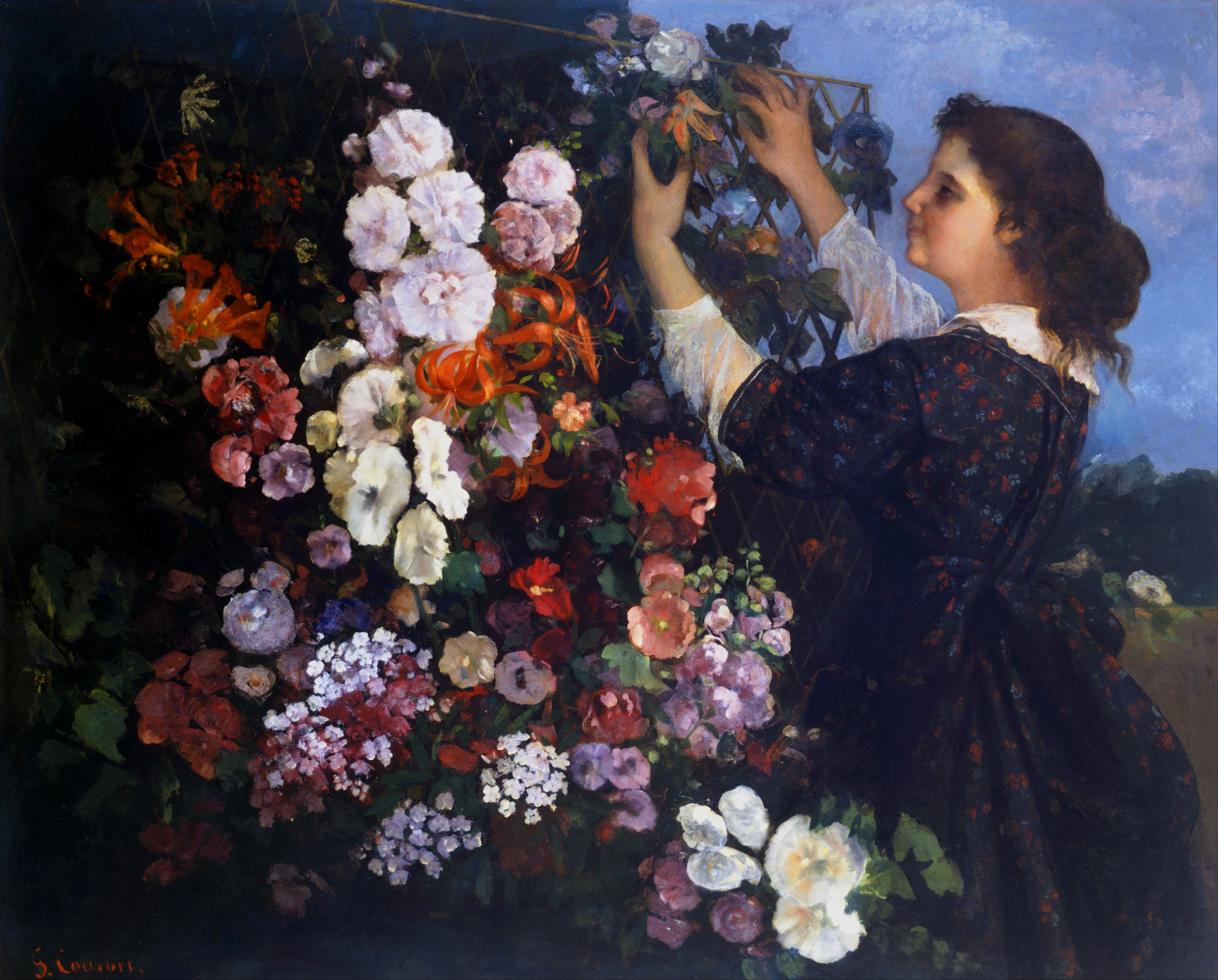
The Trellis, 1862, Toledo Museum of Art, Toledo, Ohio

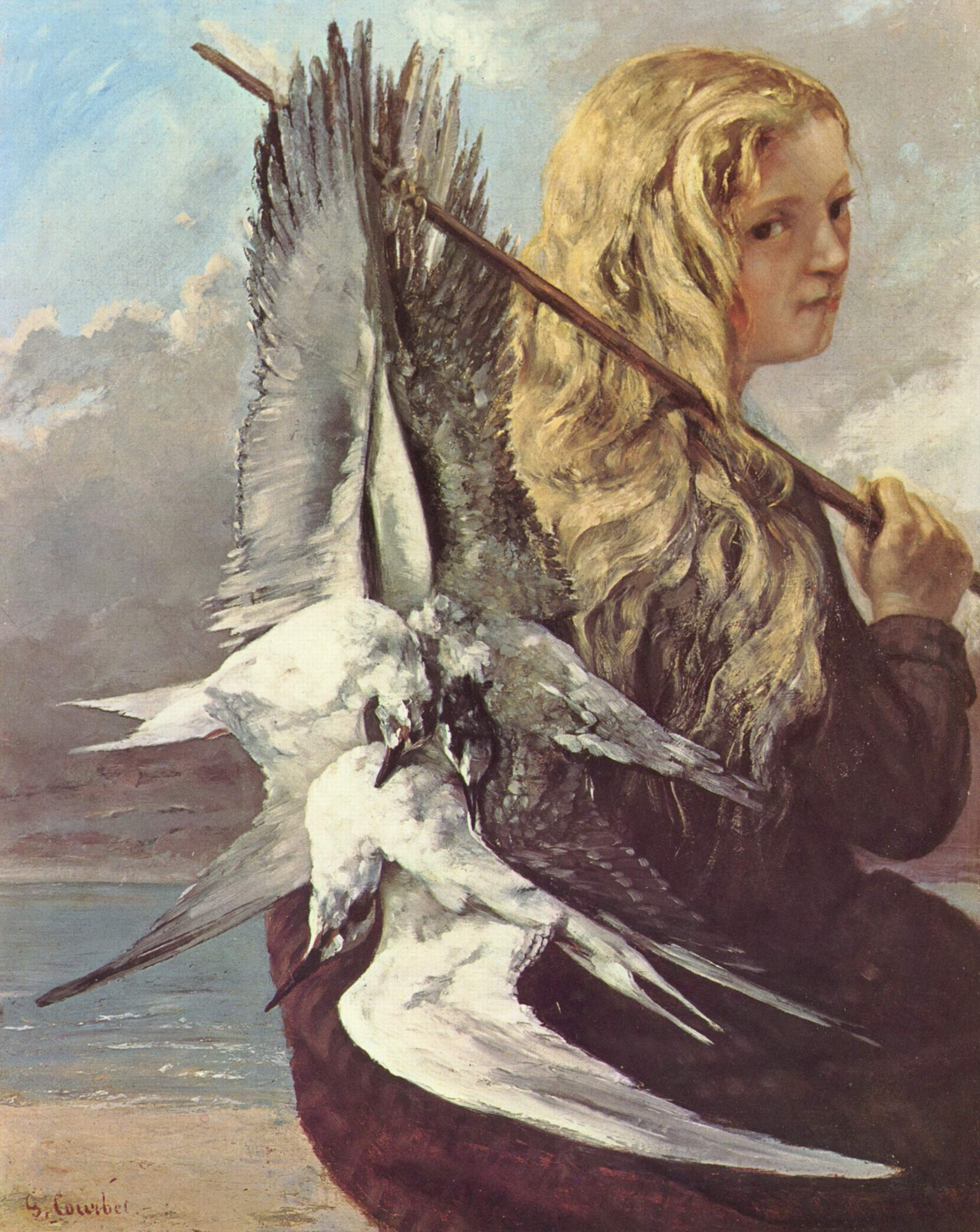
Girl with Seagulls, 1865

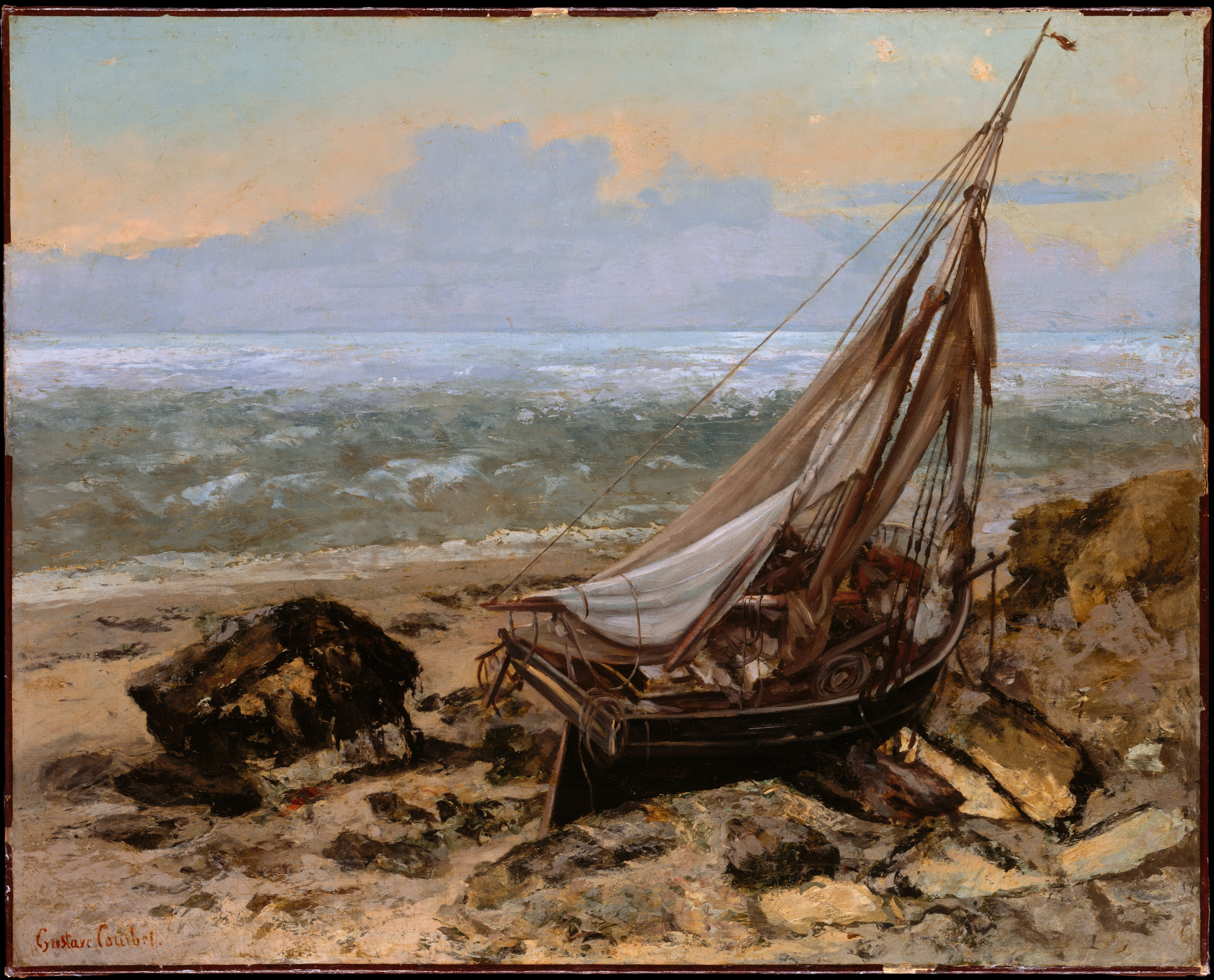
The Fishing Boat, 1865, Metropolitan Museum of Art

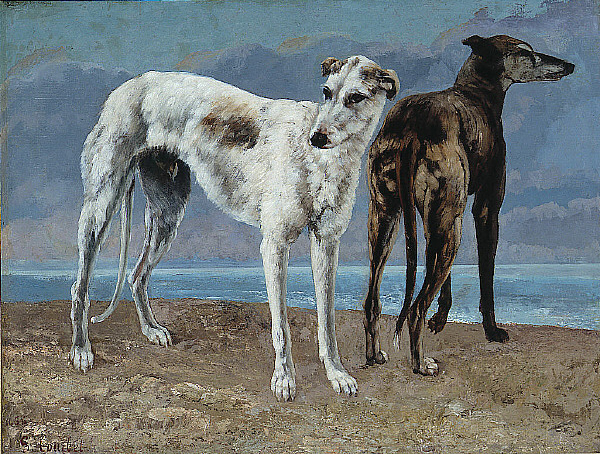
The Greyhounds of the Comte de Choiseul, 1866, Saint Louis Art Museum

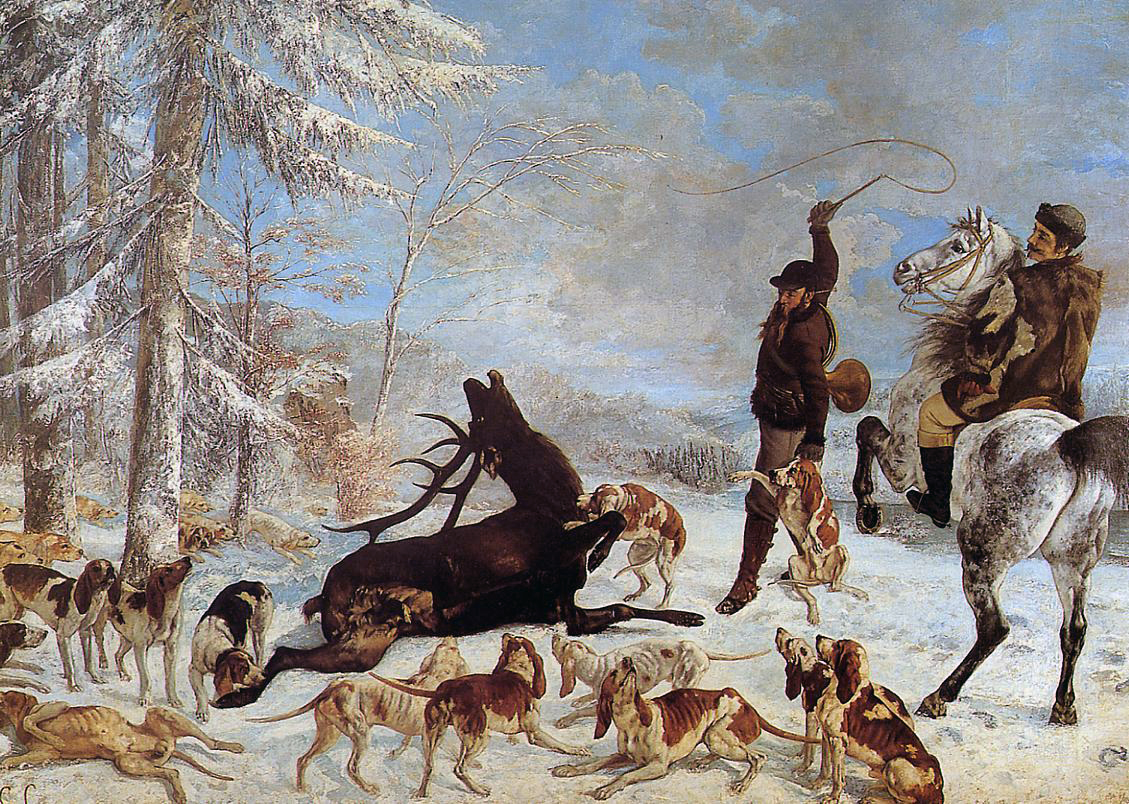
Killing a Deer, 1867, Museum of Art, Besançon

== Legacy ==
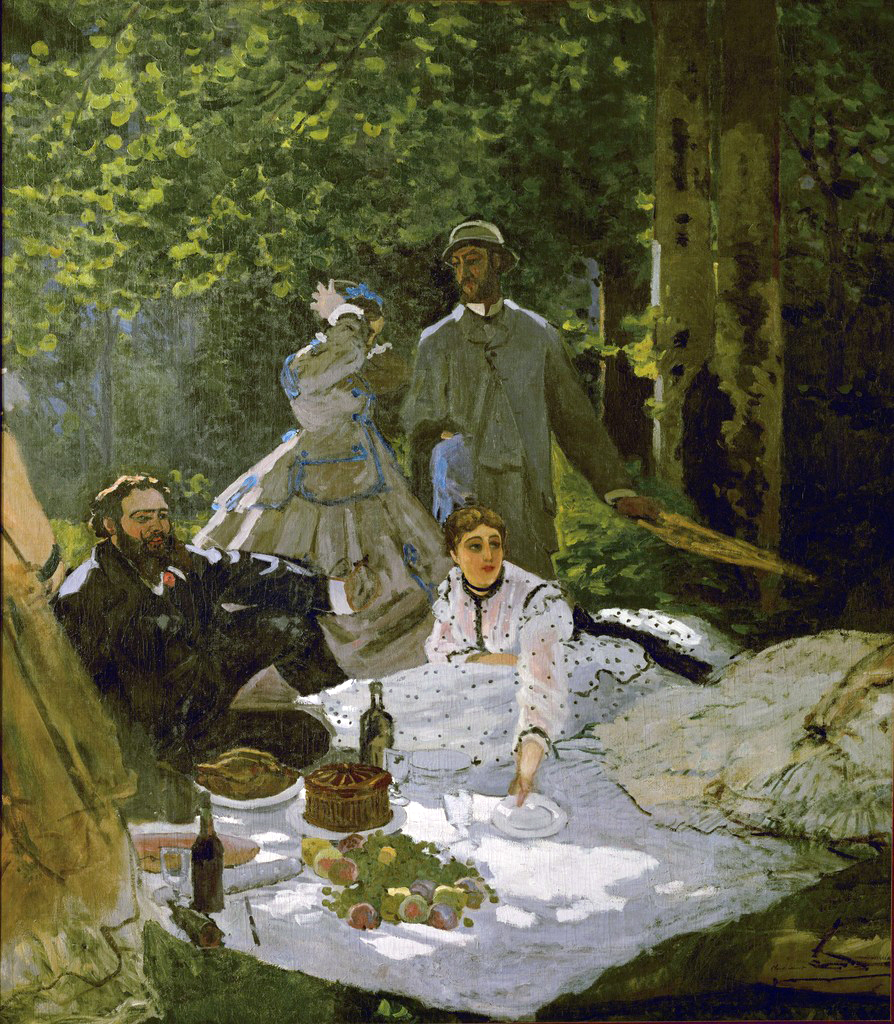
Claude Monet, Le Déjeuner sur l'herbe (right section), with Gustave Courbet, 1865–66, Musée d'Orsay, Paris

Courbet was admired by many artists. Claude Monet included a portrait of Courbet in his own version of Le Déjeuner sur l'herbe from 1865 to 1866 (Musée d'Orsay, Paris). Courbet's particular kind of realism influenced many artists to follow, notably among them the German painters of the Leibl circle, James McNeill Whistler, and Paul Cézanne. Courbet's influence can also be seen in the work of Edward Hopper, whose Bridge in Paris (1906) and Approaching a City (1946) have been described as Freudian echoes of Courbet's The Source of the Loue and The Origin of the World. His pupils included Henri Fantin-Latour, Hector Hanoteau and Olaf Isaachsen.

Courbet once wrote this in a letter:

I have always lived in freedom; let me end my life free; when I am dead let this be said of me: 'He belonged to no school, to no church, to no institution, to no academy, least of all to any régime except the régime of liberty.'

=== Courbet and Cubism ===
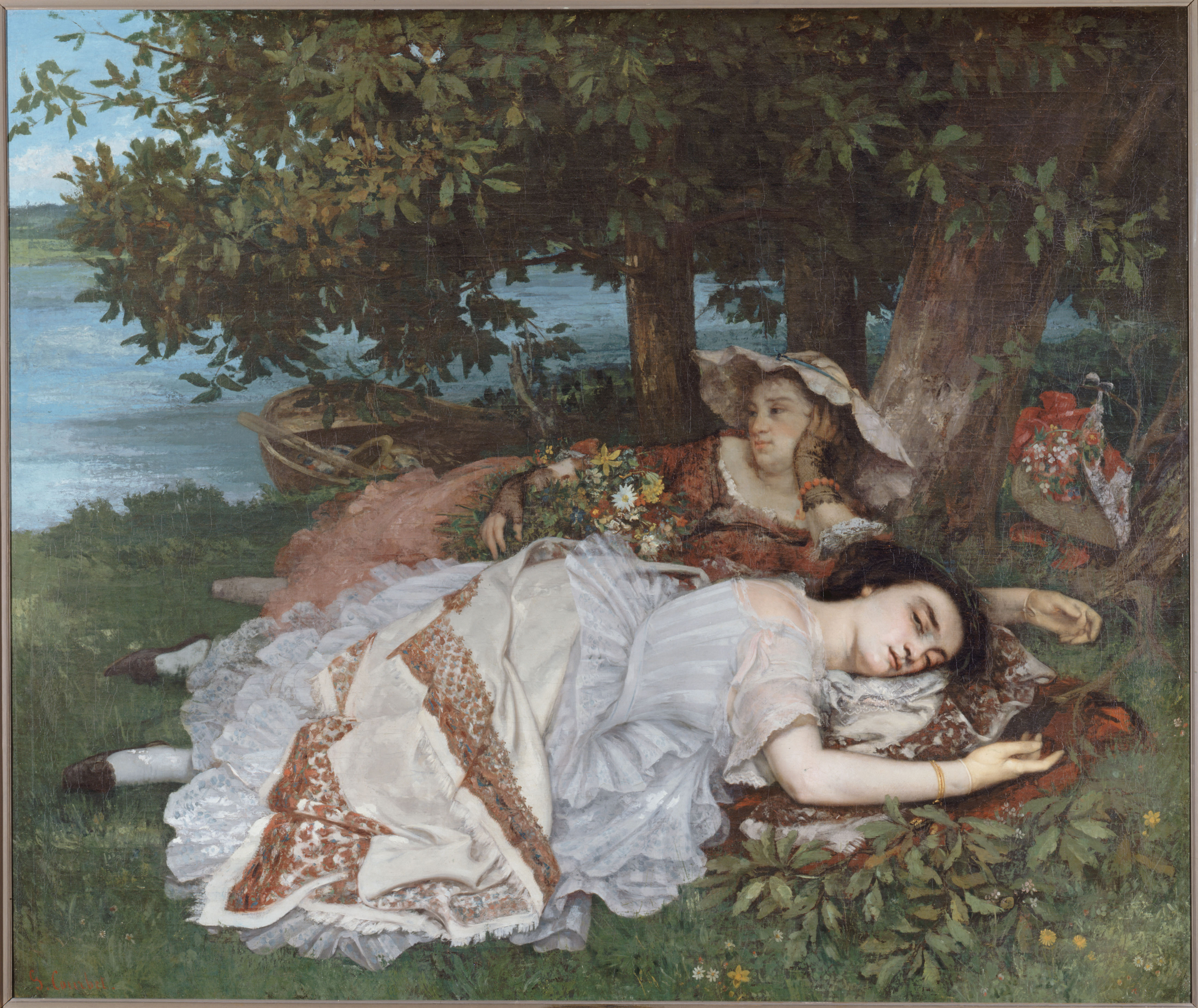
Young Ladies Beside the Seine (Summer), 1856, Petit Palais, Paris: one of Courbet's best-known paintings, exemplifying his "uncompromising emphasis on density and weight"

Two 19th-century artists prepared the way for the emergence of Cubism in the 20th century: Courbet and Cézanne. Cézanne's contributions are well-known. Courbet's importance was announced by Guillaume Apollinaire, poet-spokesperson for the Cubists. Writing in Les Peintres Cubistes, Méditations Esthétiques (1913) he declared, "Courbet is the father of the new painters." Jean Metzinger and Albert Gleizes often portrayed Courbet as the father of all modern art.

Both artists sought to transcend the conventional methods of rendering nature; Cézanne through a dialectical method revealing the process of seeing, Courbet by his materialism. The Cubists would combine these two approaches in developing a revolution in art.

On a formal level, Courbet wished to convey the physical characteristics of what he was painting: its density, weight, and texture. Art critic John Berger said: "No painter before Courbet was ever able to emphasize so uncompromisingly the density and weight of what he was painting." This emphasis on material reality endowed his subjects with dignity. Berger observed that the Cubist painters "were at great pains to establish the physical presence of what they were representing. And in this, they are the heirs of Courbet."

== Nazi-looted art ==
During the Third Reich (1933–1945) Jewish art collectors throughout Europe had their property seized as part of the Holocaust. Many artworks created by Courbet were looted by Nazis and their agents during this period and have only recently been reclaimed by the families of the previous owners.

Courbet's La Falaise d'Etretat was owned by the Jewish collector Marc Wolfson and his wife Erna, who both were murdered in Auschwitz. After disappearing during the Nazi occupation of France, it reappeared years later at the Musée d'Orsay. Gustav Courbet's paintings Village Girl With Goat, The Father, and Landscape With Rocks were discovered in the Gurlitt Trove of art stashed in Munich. It is not known to whom they belonged. The French Database of Art Objects at the Jeu de Paume (Cultural Plunder by the Einsatzstab Reichsleiter Rosenberg) has 41 entries for Courbet. In 2023, the University of Cambridge returned Courbet's painting La Ronde Enfantine, which was stolen in 1941 by the Nazis in Paris.

The great Hungarian Jewish collector Baron Mor Lipot Herzog owned several Courbet artworks, including Le Chateau de Blonay (Neige) (c. 1875, "The Chateau of Blonay (Snow)", now at the Budapest Museum of Fine Arts), and Courbet's most infamous work — L'Origine du monde ("The Origin of the World"). His collection of 2000–2500 pieces was looted by Nazis and many are still missing.

== See also ==
- Léonce Bénédite
- Lost artworks
- Western painting
