= The Meeting (Courbet) =

Painting by Gustave Courbet

The Meeting or "Bonjour, Monsieur Courbet"
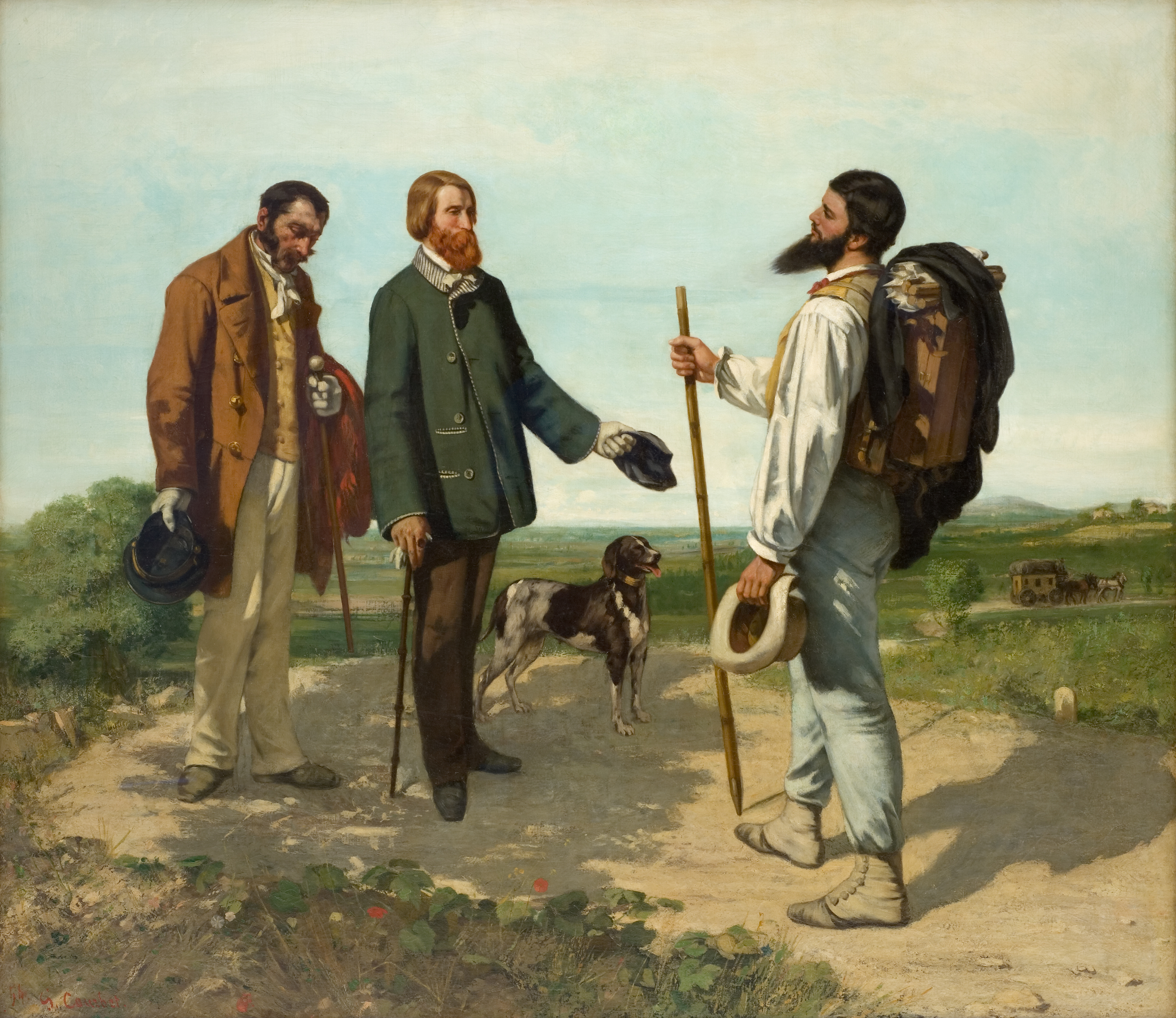
- Artist: Gustave Courbet
- Year: 1854
- Medium: Oil on canvas
- Dimensions: 129 cm × 149 cm (51 in × 59 in)
- Location: Musée Fabre, Montpellier

The Meeting or "Bonjour, Monsieur Courbet" (French: La rencontre, ou "Bonjour Monsieur Courbet") is an oil-on-canvas painting by Gustave Courbet, made in 1854. It depicts the artist on his way to Montpellier meeting his patron Alfred Bruyas, his servant Calas, and his dog Breton. One of Courbet's most popular works, it also serves as one of the artist's most emblematic contributions to the 19th-century movement of Realism. The composition is based on the myth of the Wandering Jew.

== Background ==
The Meeting was commissioned by Alfred Bruyas, the son of a Montpellier banker who chose to employ his wealth in art patronage. His relationship with Courbet first began with his purchases of The Bathers (1853) and The Sleeping Spinner (1853) at the Salon of 1853 in Paris. Bruyas viewed Courbet as the means of achieving his "Solution" in art. What Bruyas meant by his Solution is left vague; he defined it in an 1858 as "a Painting [sic] bringing all things together through its wonderful poetry". His writings also associated it with the realization of social progress through simple, natural depictions of reality.

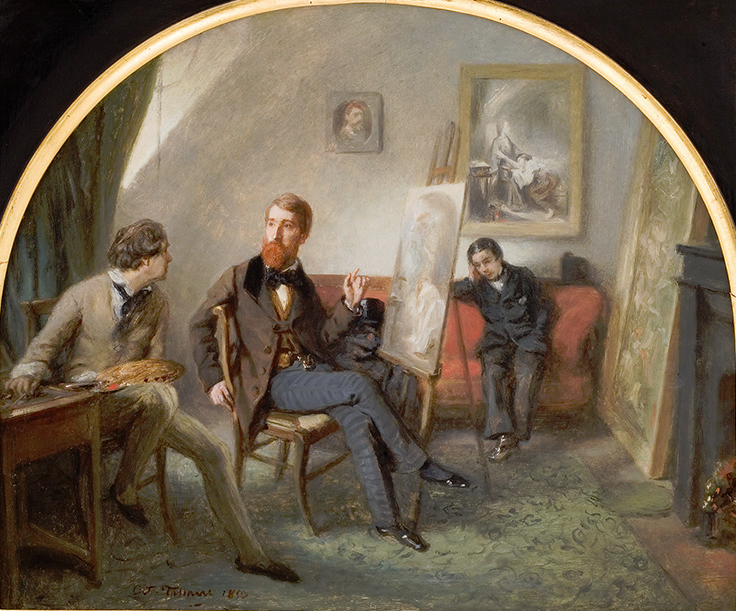
The Painter's Studio (1853), by Octave Tassaert. The work, commissioned by Bruyas and executed before The Meeting, presents the patron in a central role.

Bruyas invited Courbet to Montpellier following the 1853 Salon, and Courbet likely began planning The Meeting in anticipation of this visit. Bruyas, likely indicating how he hoped for Courbet to paint, sent the artist a photograph of The Painter's Studio (1853) by Octave Tassaert. In the painting, Tassaert portrays his patron in a central, authoritative role. Courbet's response, though not a rebuke of Bruyas, asserted his independence as an artist. He wrote back that he wished to live "without ever having to make a painting as big as a hand to please anyone, or to be sold". Nevertheless, Courbet recognized that Bruyas's patronage was essential to his pursuit of Realist art, writing on their relationship: "It was inevitable because it is not we who have encountered each other but our solutions".

Courbet completed The Meeting while in Montpellier that summer. Although the work purports to show Courbet's arrival, presumably fresh off the coach in the background, there is sufficient reason to doubt such a meeting occurred as represented. It is known, for example, that Courbet had initially arrived in Montpellier by train. An alternative interpretation is that Courbet, with his box of paints and a parasol strapped to his back, is met by Bruyas and his servant, Calas, upon returning from a day of plein air sketching in the countryside.

== Composition ==
=== Courbet's painting style ===
The painting signifies a departure from the darker, muted palette of color that was typical of Courbet's earlier work. The lighter tones adopted illustrate Courbet's effort to faithfully convey the bright, warm atmosphere of Montpellier, and more generally that of France's Mediterranean coastline. Courbet portrays the countryside in the background with great detail, likely working off of a previous plein air sketch of the scene. The setting can be located as the intersection of two roads, Sète and Saint-Jean-de-Védas near Lattes.

The figures within The Meeting are distinctly separated by Courbet's use of fine brushstrokes to create clear borders, rather than blending. All three men are made into stark silhouettes against the bright, light blue color that Courbet paints the sky with. The result is a fragmentation of the painting into parts, representing a stylistic departure from the traditional norms of composition, which called for a unified construction of a painting. While likely coming off as unpleasant to viewers at the time, Courbet's preference for individuating each element may have been in order to more faithfully illustrate reality as it is lived and experienced, that is, in a free, natural, and not always cohesive manner.

=== The Wandering Jew ===
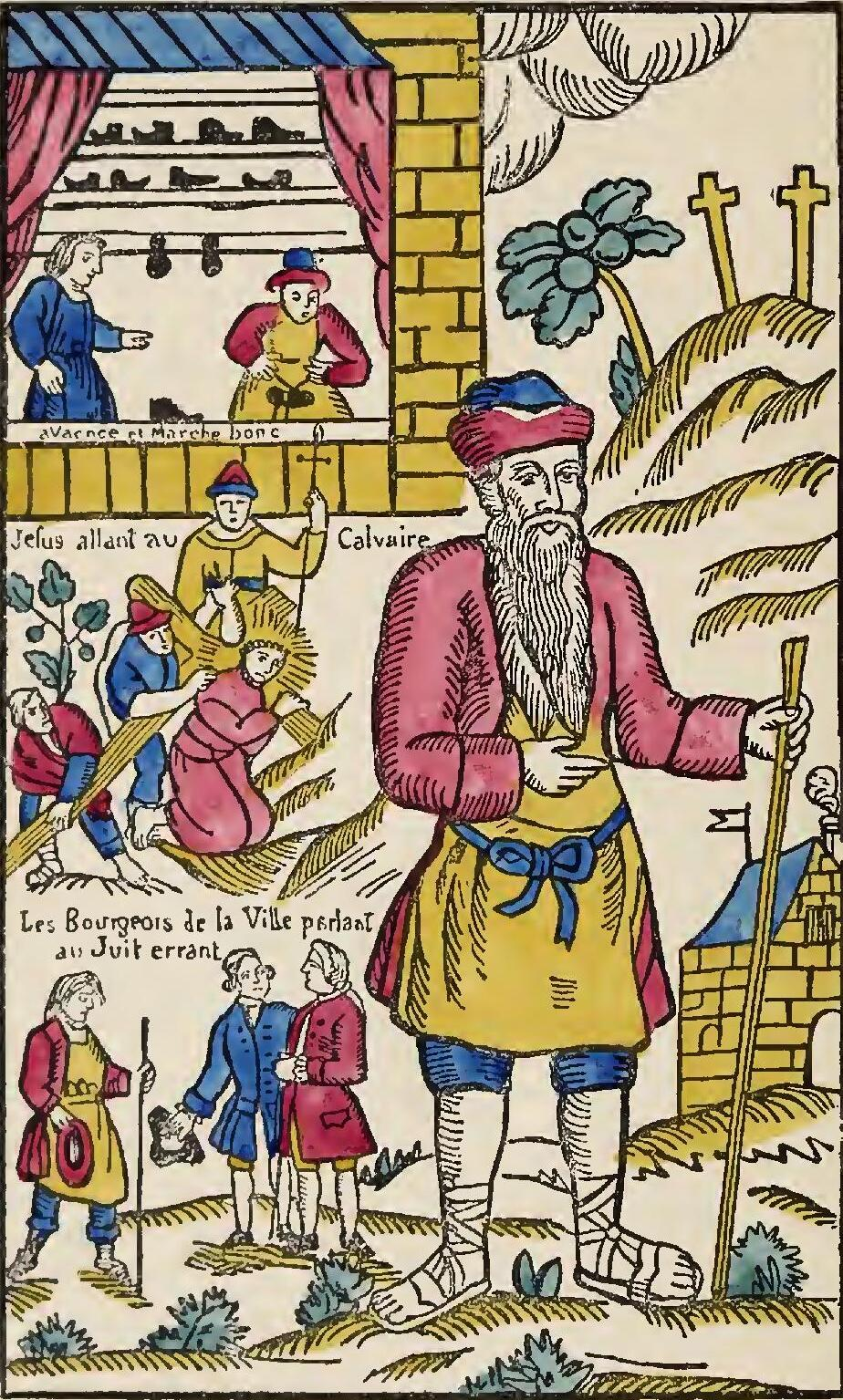
Frontispiece to Champfleury's Histoire de l'imagerie populaire. The depiction of the Wandering Jew used by Courbet is bottom left.

The Meeting's composition takes direct inspiration from the Wandering Jew, the popular legend of a wanderer bound to trek for eternity for condemning Christ. The image was well known in the 19th century, so much so that a common viewer of the painting would have likely picked up on Courbet's reference. Among art historians, the source was first identified in a 1967 article by Linda Nochlin, who suggested that Courbet probably took inspiration from a particular work made known to him through Champfleury, a French critic, friend of Courbet's, and advocate of realist art. The work would later appear as the cover of Champfleury's essay "Le Juif-errant", and depicts two burghers (bourgeois men) meeting the Wandering Jew alongside a country road. Courbet flips the orientation of the figures in The Meeting, such that the burghers are on the left rather than the right. Nochlin suggests Courbet did so to draw attention to himself, however, it remains possible that Courbet saw a reversed version of the print or even an entirely different image.

Courbet closely associated himself with many of the essential qualities of the Wandering Jew, who is both consigned to the margins of society and free to roam. As an artist, he built up a self-image as a voyager living in touch with the land and the countryside. Courbet wrote in 1850 that "[I] must even free myself from governments... I have, therefore, just started out on the great, wandering, and independent life of the gypsy." This lifestyle he sought to adopt was closely tied to how he viewed himself, as Nochlin would put it, as the "traveling apostle of realism."

Courbet incorporated the Wandering Jew into two other works: The Apostle, Jean Journet, Setting Off for the Conquest of Universal Harmony (1850) and A Beggar's Alms (1868).

=== Relationship between Courbet, Bruyas, Calas ===
The difference between the three men in The Meeting goes beyond the characters they represent from the Wandering Jew. Surprisingly, the artist represented himself on the same social level as Bruyas (center). Bruyas looks stiff, constrained by his green jacket, and older than the artist, despite the two being of similar age. Calas (left) has his head slightly bowed, as if in humble acknowledgement of Courbet's presence. Courbet, in contrast, appears taller, more assertive, and closer to the viewer, taking up as much of the composition as Bruyas, Calas, and the dog combined.

== Display and reception ==
The Meeting was first displayed to the public at the Paris Exposition Universelle of 1855. Courbet initially wrote to Bruyas, who remained in Montpellier, of the painting's success. The real reaction from critics had largely been one of ridicule. To many, Courbet's self-portrayal affirmed their perception of the artist as egotistical. The critic Edmond About referred to the painting as "Fortune bowing before genius," adding, "neither the master nor the valet cast their shadows on the ground; the shadow belong [sic] to M. Courbet who alone can stop the rays of the sun." Caricaturists focused on the same relationship; the illustrator Quillenbois exaggerated the length of Courbet's beard, while Bruyas, Calas, and Bruyas's dog kneeled before the artist.

Negative reviews of The Meeting were perceived by Bruyas as a slight to his reputation as a collector. Many reviews failed to even mention Bruyas by name. Bruyas did not exhibit the painting again until 1868 when he donated his collection to the Musée Fabre in Montpellier. The Meeting was placed centrally in the Musée Fabre's permanent collection, though this time in a manner that reoriented the depiction of Bruyas. By surrounding the piece with other works commissioned by him, across a range of subjects, Bruyas sought to reassert his image as an influential benefactor of the arts.

Bruyas's collection became well-known to artists outside of Montpellier. Those who visited the Musée Fabre would include Vincent van Gogh and Paul Signac, with The Meeting drawing praise from the latter as "an exquisite landscape... sharp and lively".
