= Adolphe Pierre Leleux =

French painter

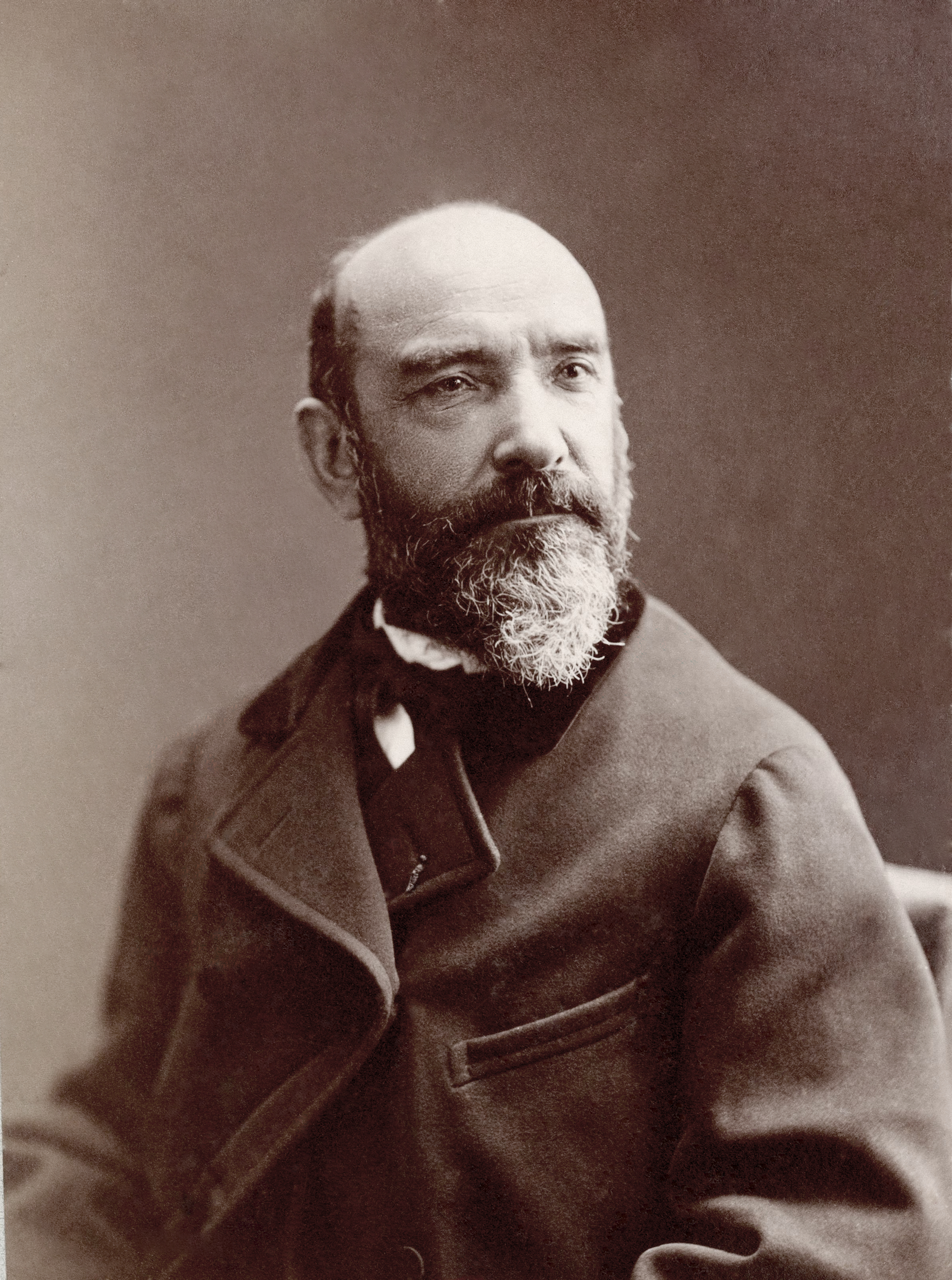
Adolphe Leleux picture

Adolphe Pierre Leleux (15 November 1812, in Paris – 27 July 1891) was a French painter and illustrator. His brother Armand Leleux was also a painter.

== Biography ==
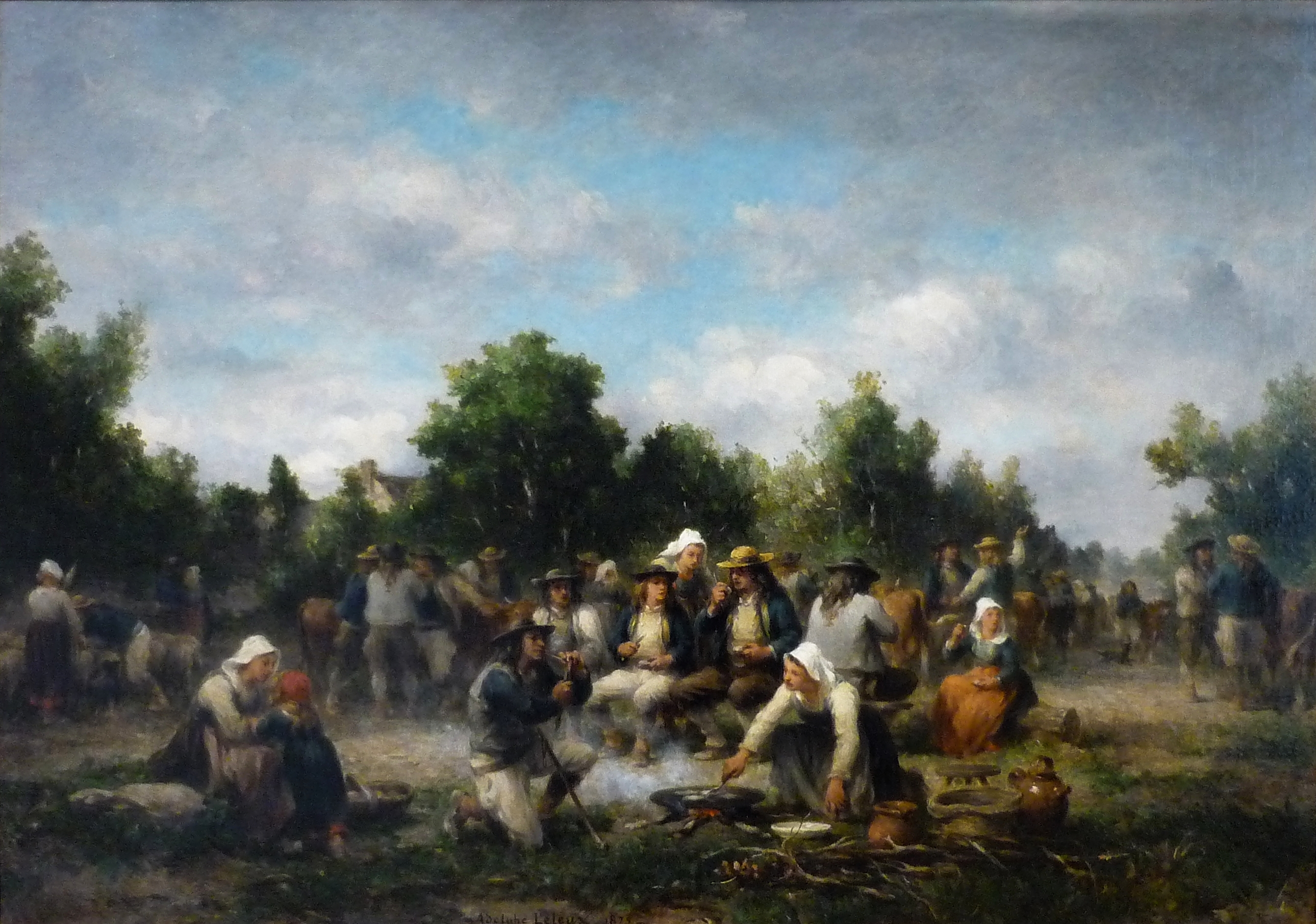
Jour de marché dans le Finistère. An 1875 painting held in Cognac's Musée d'art et d'histoire

Adolphe Leleux was self-taught, and exhibited work at the Paris Salon from 1835 onwards. Although he decided to concentrate on painting after 1837, he did study engraving in the studio of Alexandre Vincent Sixdeniers. It was in 1838 that he discovered Brittany, and painted many genre paintings inspired by the Breton countryside. He was given the nickname "Leleux le Breton".

Other works by Adolphe Pierre Leleux

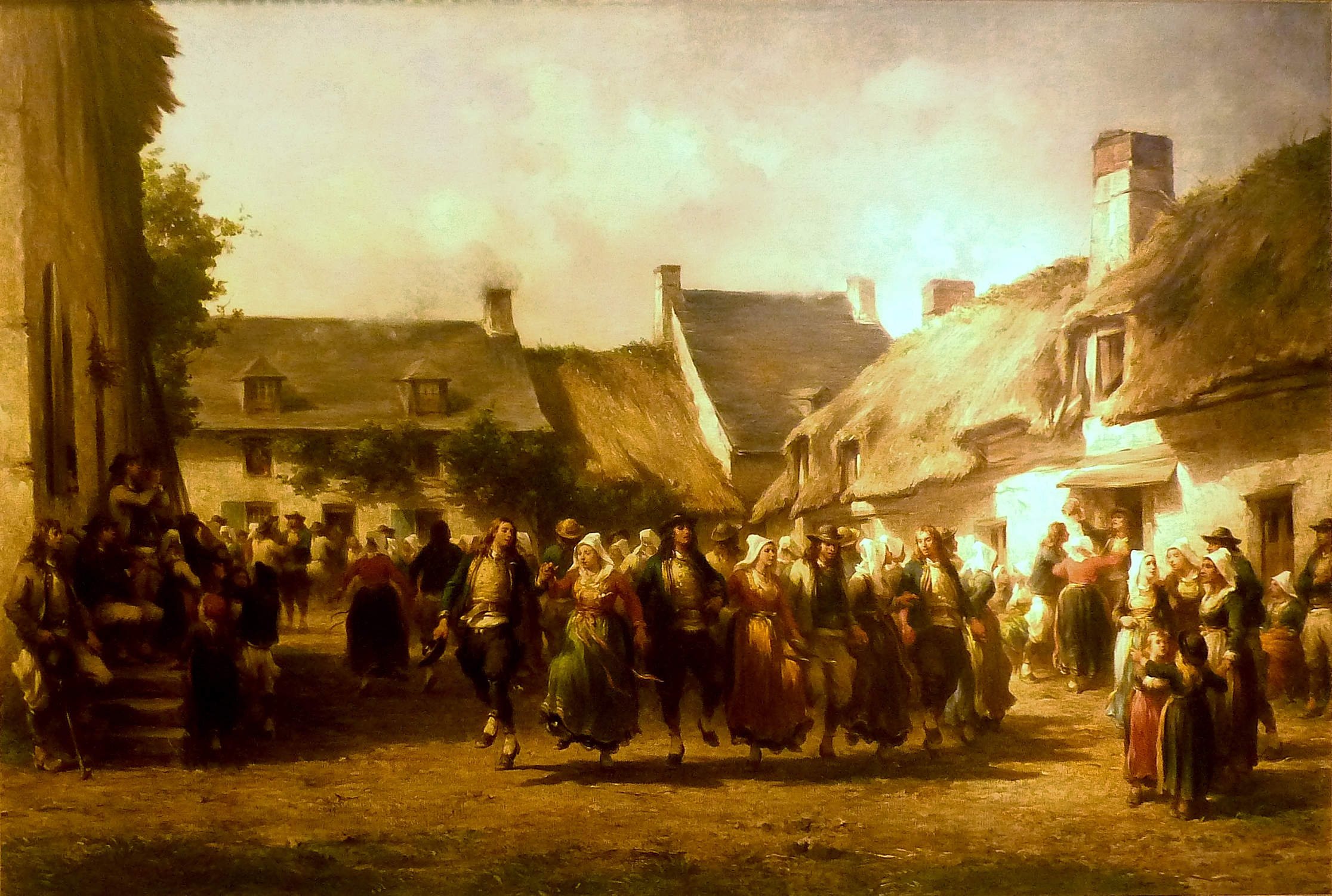
Une noce en Bretagne. This 1863 work, held in the Quimper Musée des beaux-arts, depicts a wedding.

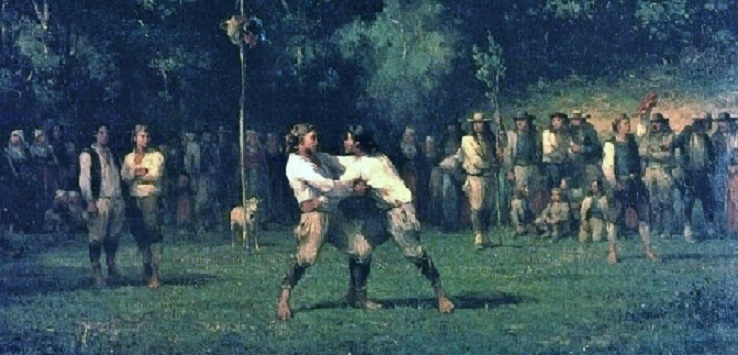
Adolphe Leleux; Jour de fête en Cornouaille or Lutteurs de Basse-Bretagne. This 1864 painting was thought to have been inspired by the wrestlers at the "pardon de Saint-Cadou" in Gouesnach.

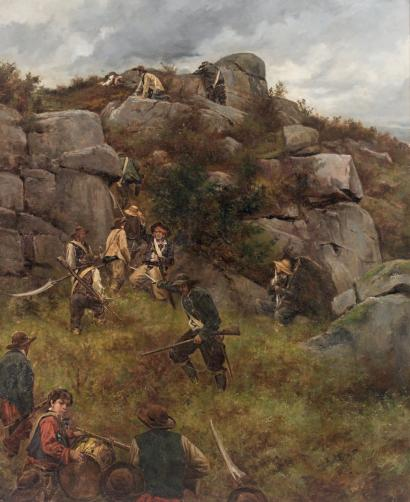
L'assaut des Chouans.

== Other works ==
- Bedouins attaques par des chiefs. This 1850 painting is held in Lyon's Musée des beaux-arts. It was exhibited at the Paris Salon of 1850.
- Bucherons Bretons. This 1845 work is held in Chantilly's Musée Condé.
- Depiquage des Bles en Algerie. This 1853 painting, one of many executed by Leleux whilst in Algeria, is held in Lille's Musée des beaux-arts. It was shown at the Paris Salon of 1853.
- Edmond Hedouin. A portrait of 1880. Held in Versailles' Musée national des châteaux de Versailles et de Trianon.
- Le Mot d'Ordre.24 Fevrier.1848. A painting dating to 1848 which is held in Versailles' Musée national des châteaux de Versailles et de Trianon.
