= Florinda (Winterhalter) =

Painting by Franz Xaver Winterhalter

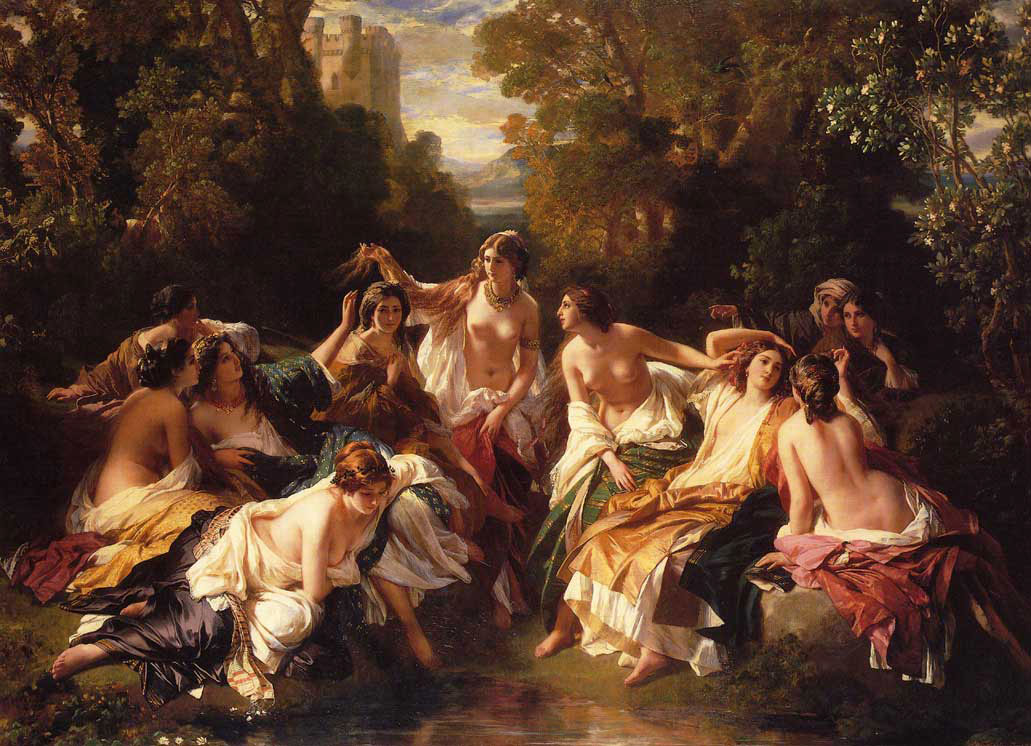
- Artist: Franz Xaver Winterhalter
- Year: 1853
- Medium: Oil on canvas
- Dimensions: 178.4 cm × 245.7 cm (70.2 in × 96.7 in)
- Location: Metropolitan Museum of Art, New York

Florinda is an oil-on-canvas painting by German painter and lithographer Franz Xaver Winterhalter. It was completed in 1853 and is now in the Metropolitan Museum of Art in New York, where it is not on display. It featured at the Salon of 1853 in Paris.

The picture depicts the legend of King Roderic of Spain spying on Florinda la Cava and the other palace girls while they bathe in a garden in Toledo, in order to decide the fairest. After Roderic selects and courts Florinda, her father takes revenge by inviting the Moors to invade and conquer Spain.

The painting is a replica of the one displayed at Osborne House which Queen Victoria gave as a birthday present to Prince Albert in 1852.
