= The Song of Songs (painting) =

Painting by Gustave Moreau

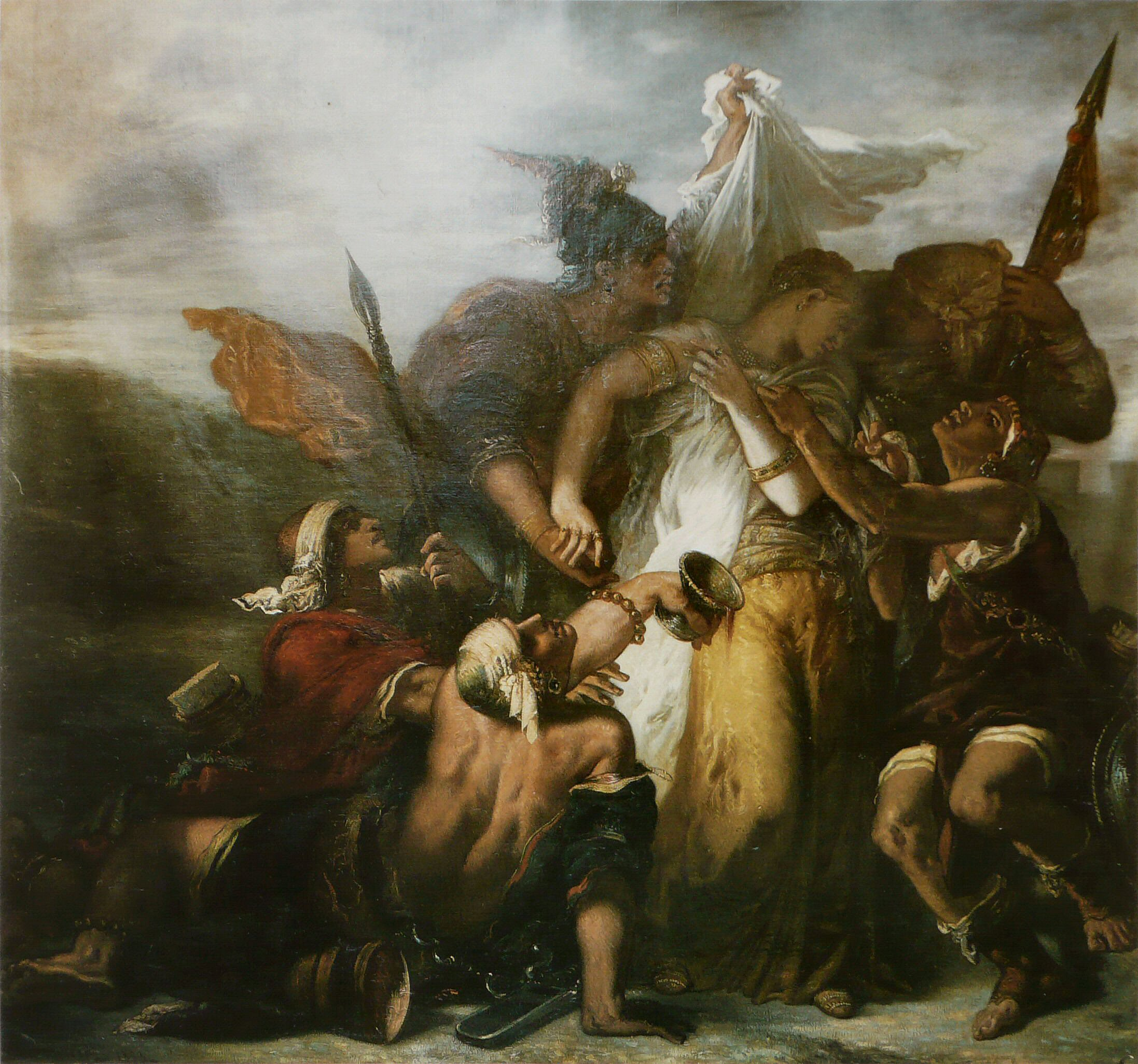
- Artist: Gustave Moreau
- Year: 1853
- Type: Oil on canvas, history painting
- Dimensions: 300 cm × 319 cm (120 in × 126 in)
- Location: Musée des Beaux-Arts; Dijon

The Song of Songs (French: Le Cantique des cantiques) is an 1853 oil painting by the French artist Gustave Moreau. It is inspired by a passage from the biblical Song of Songs. It depicts a scene where the Shulamite woman is attacked by the drunken city watchmen. It was exhibited at the Salon of 1853 held in Paris. It is now in the collection of the Musée des Beaux-Arts in Dijon.

== Bibliography ==
- Exum, J. Cheryl. Art as Biblical Commentary: Visual Criticism from Hagar the Wife of Abraham to Mary the Mother of Jesus. Bloomsbury Academic, 2021.
- Mathieu, Pierre-Louis & Lacambre, Geneviève. The Gustave Moreau Museum. Edition de la Réunion des musées nationaux, 1997.
