= The Idyll (Gérôme) =

Painting by Jean-Léon Gérôme

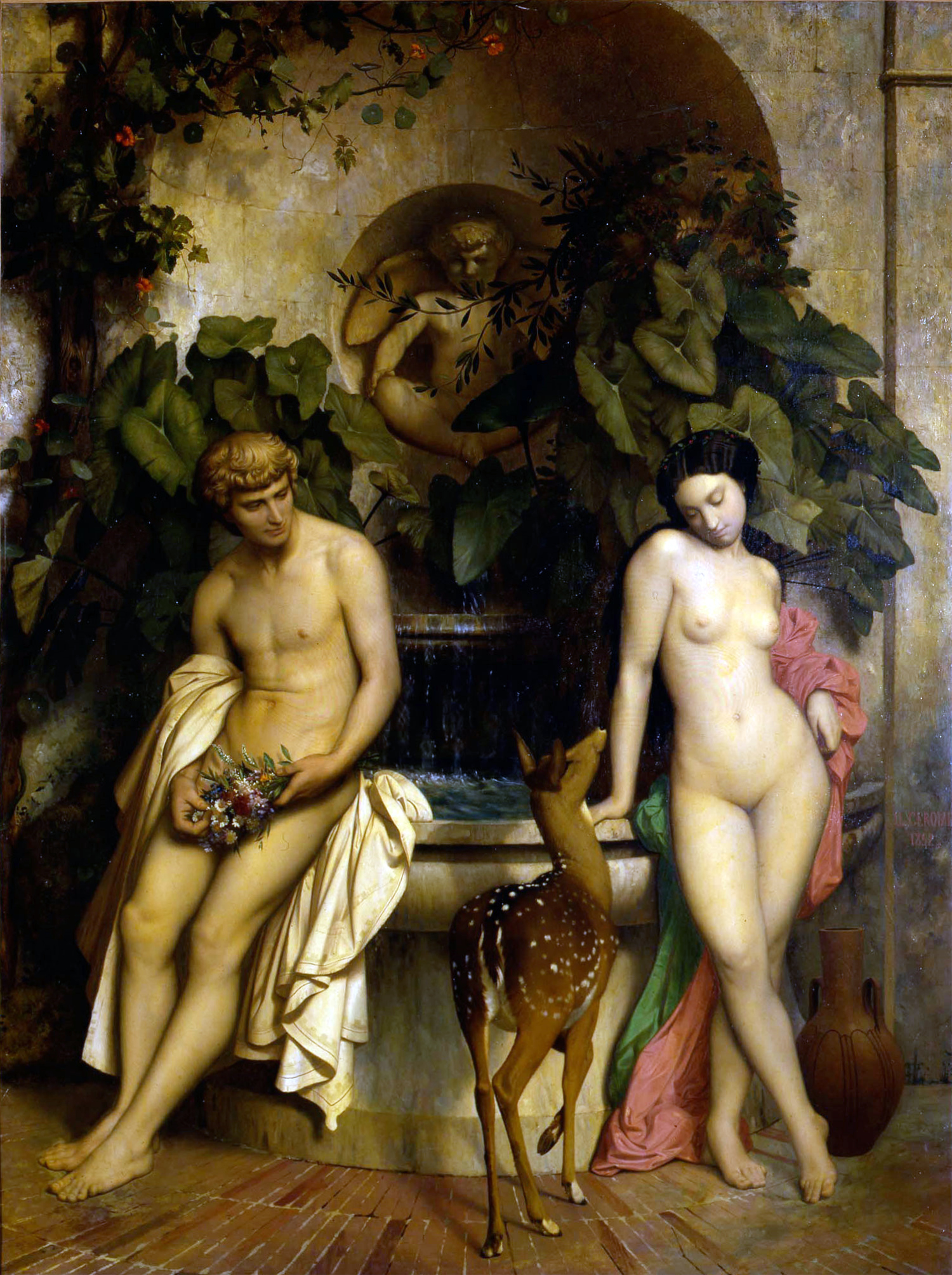
- Artist: Jean-Léon Gérôme
- Year: 1852
- Medium: Oil on canvas, academic art
- Dimensions: 212.1 cm × 155.9 cm (83.5 in × 61.4 in)
- Location: Musée Massey; Tarbes

The Idyll (French: L'Idylle) is an 1852 oil painting by the French artist Jean-Léon Gérôme. Produced in the Neo-Grec style, the art critic Théophile Gautier suggested it as inspired by the novel Daphnis and Chloe from the classical era. It is also known by the alternative title Daphnis and Chloe.

The painting was exhibited at the Salon of 1853 in Paris. It later featured in the Paris Exposition of 1900. Today it is in the collection of the Musée Massey in Tarbes.

== Bibliography ==
- Ackermann, Gerald M. Jean-Léon Gérôme: His Life, His Work. ACR Edition, 1997.
- De Font-Réaulx, Dominique, Des Cars, Laurence & Papet, Édouard. 'The Spectacular Art of Jean-Léon Gérôme". University of California Press, 2010
