= Salon of 1853 =

1853 art exhibition in Paris

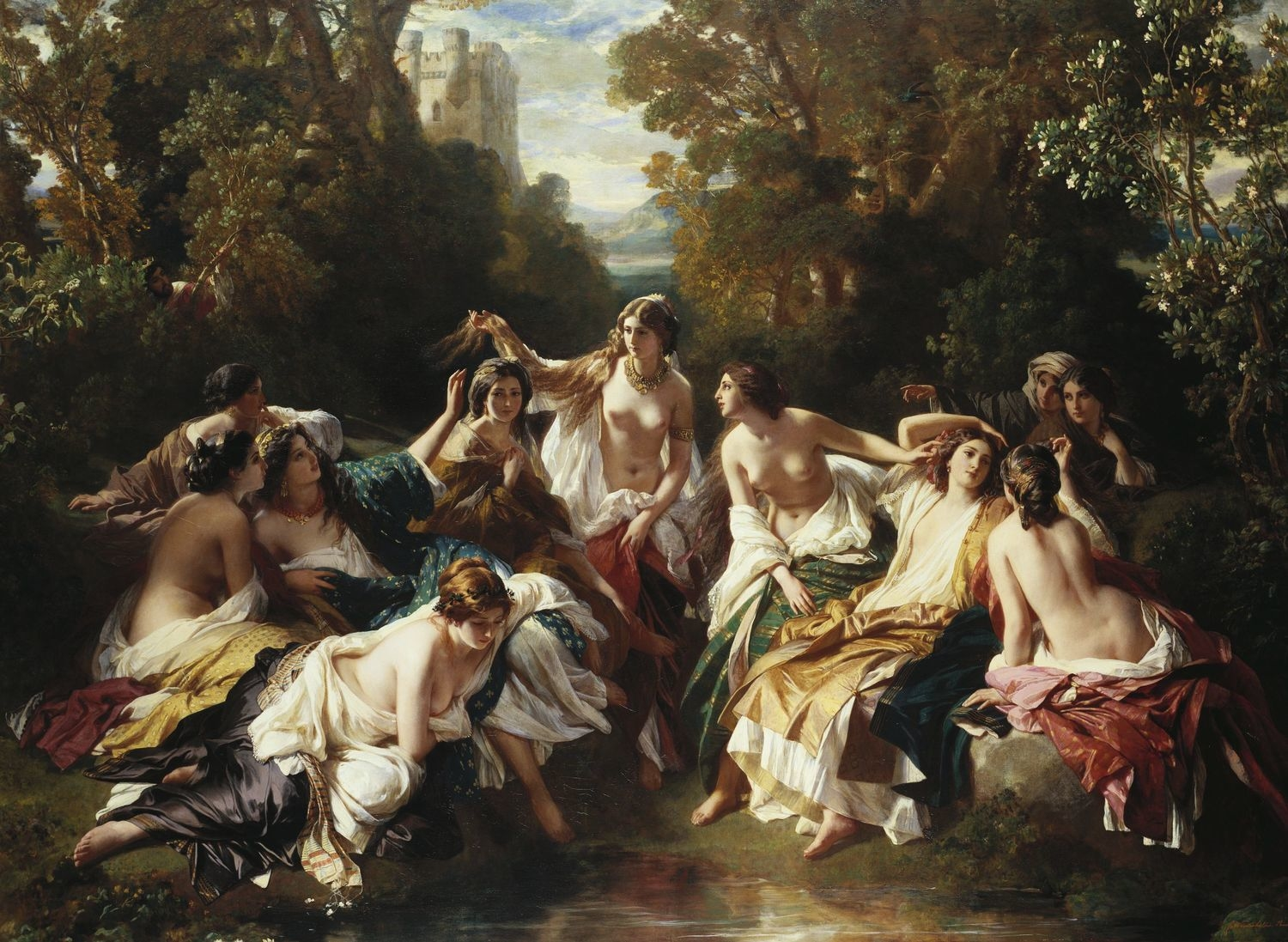
Florinda by Franz Xaver Winterhalter

The Salon of 1853 was an art exhibition held in Paris. An edition of the regular Salon it was organised by the Académie des Beaux-Arts and opened on 15 May 1853. It took place at the Hôtel des Menus-Plaisirs in Paris. Featuring submissions by leading painters, sculptors and architects, it was the first to take place following the formal establishment of the Second French Empire under Napoleon III. His new wife Empress Eugénie visited the Salon and acquired several works. A portrait of the Empress by Édouard Dubufe was featured in the exhibition.

Notable paintings on display included The Horse Fair by Rosa Bonheur. Although she had been exhibiting her animal paintings since the Salon of 1841 with measured success, this painting was an outstanding hit and became her best-known work touring across Europe. Jean-Baptiste-Camille Corot submitted a religious painting St Sebastian Succoured by Holy Women The German painter Franz Xaver Winterhalter, best known for his glamorous portraits of royalty, displayed a history painting Florinda which was a replica of one produced for Britain's Queen Victoria.

It was followed by the Salon of 1855 held at the Palace of Industry as part of the Universal Exposition.

== Gallery ==
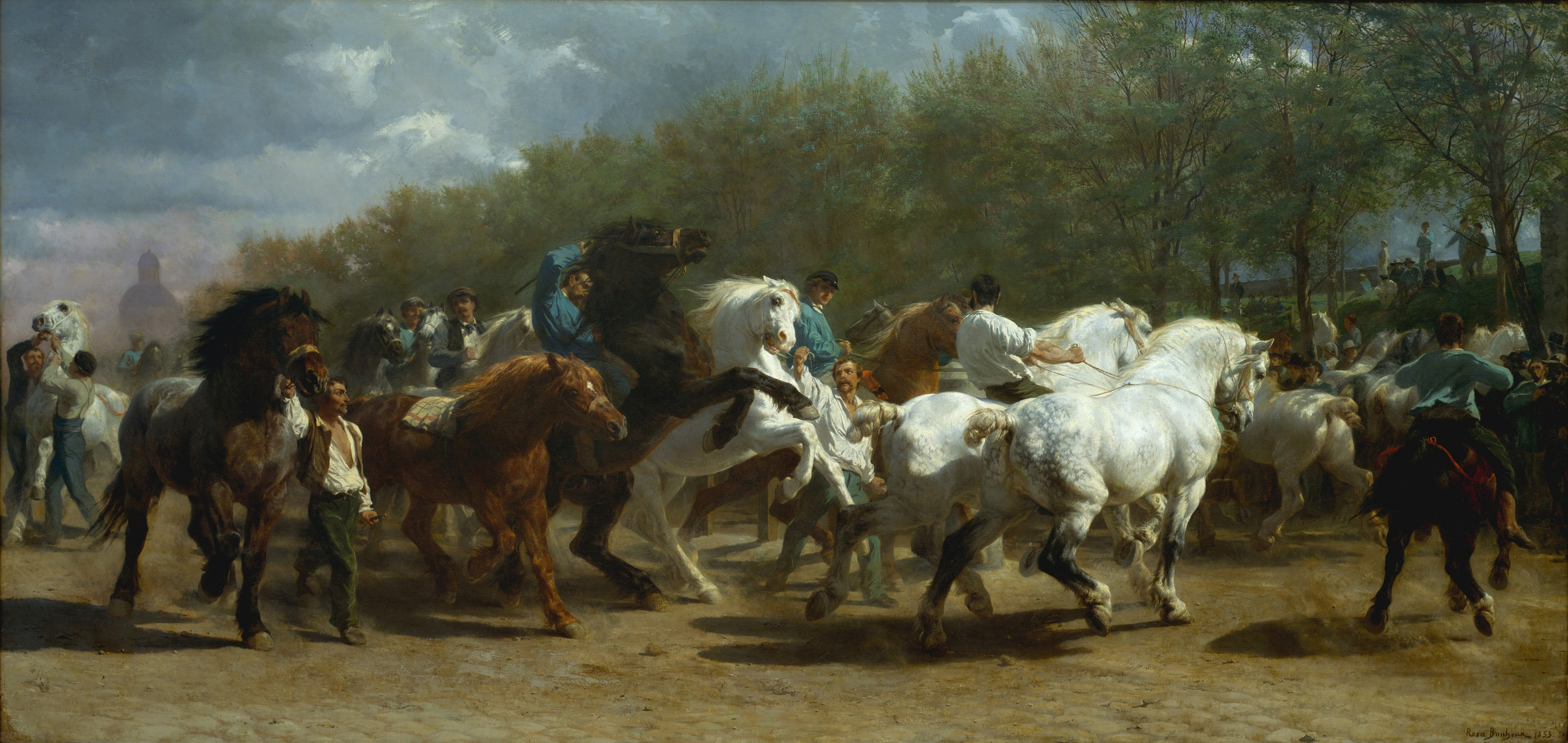
The Horse Fair by Rosa Bonheur

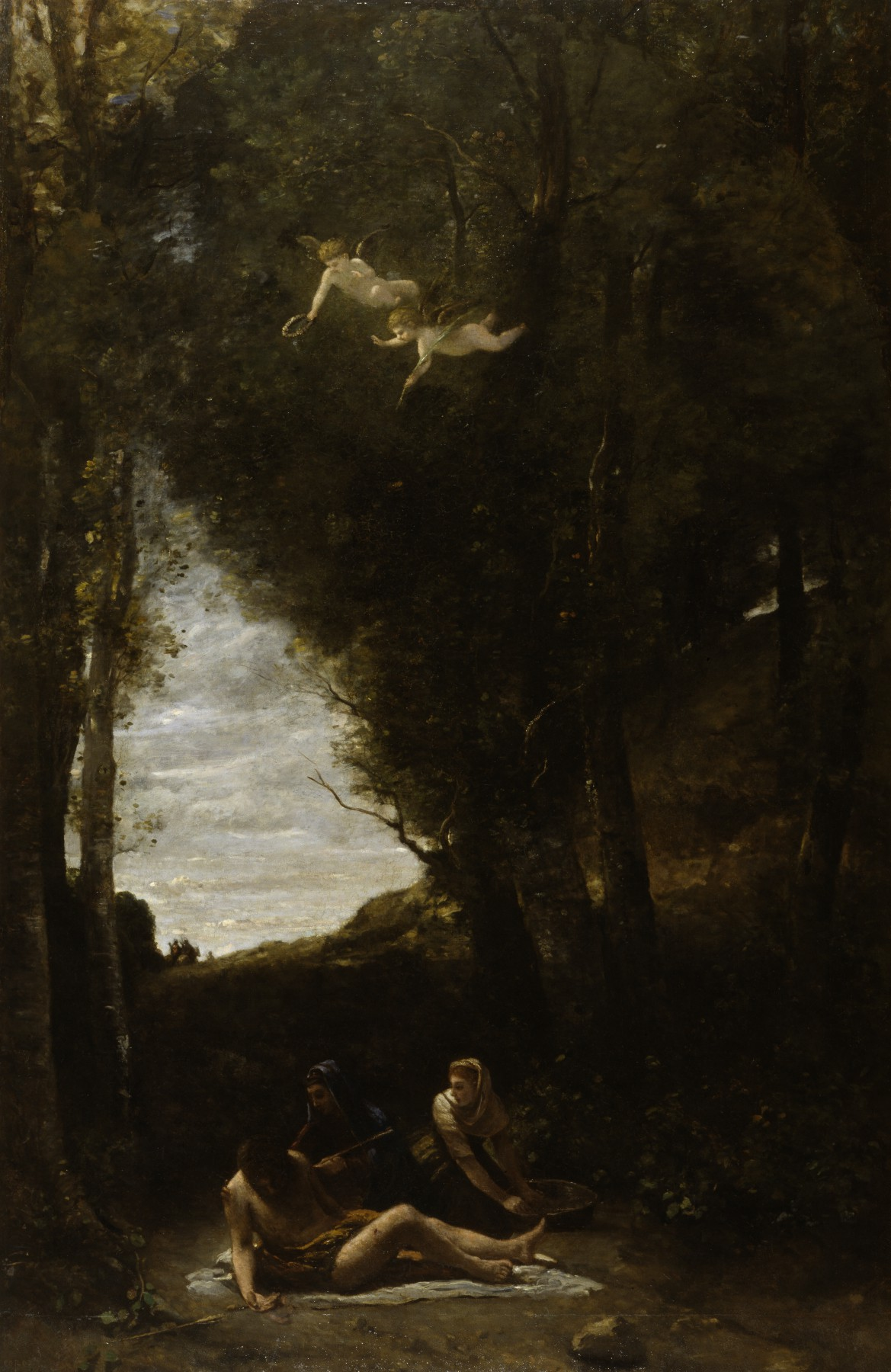
St Sebastian Succoured by Holy Women by Jean-Baptiste-Camille Corot

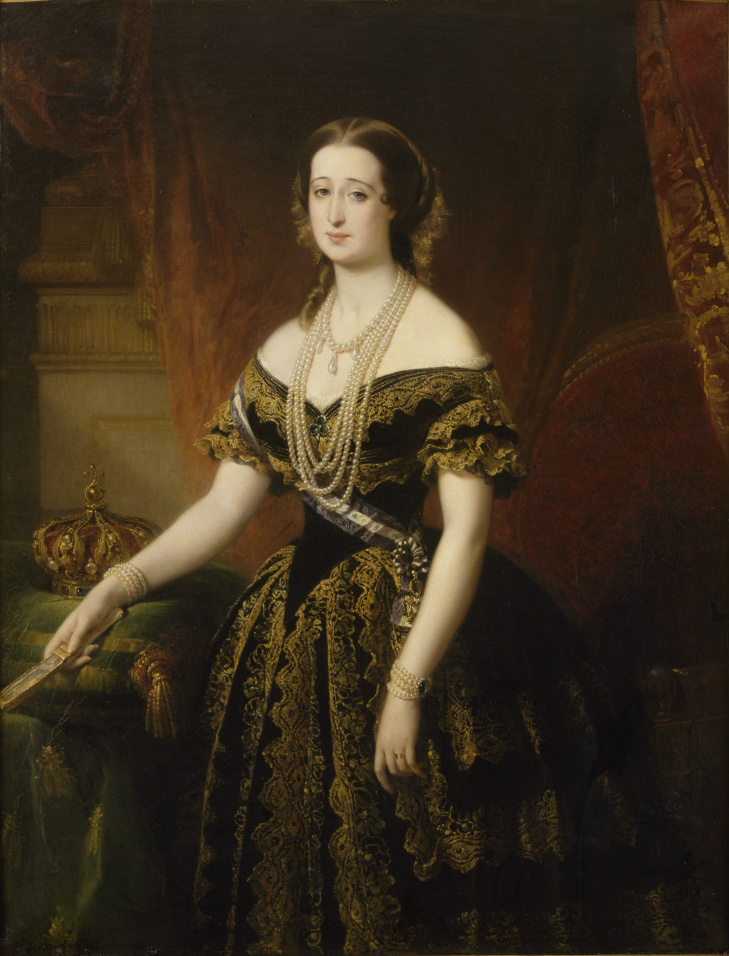
Portrait of Empress Eugénie by Édouard Dubufe

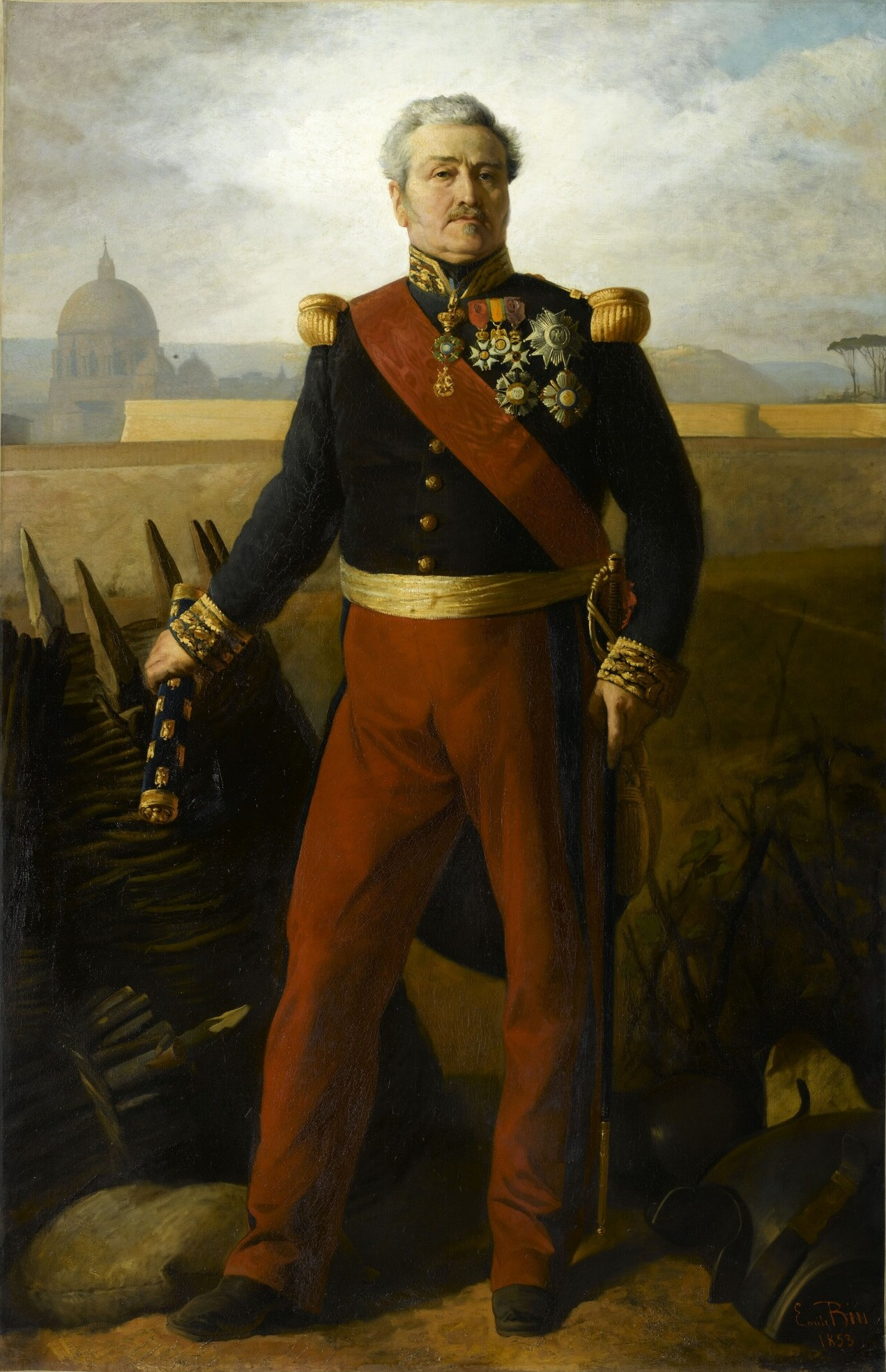
Portrait of Jean-Baptiste Philibert Vaillant by Émile Bin

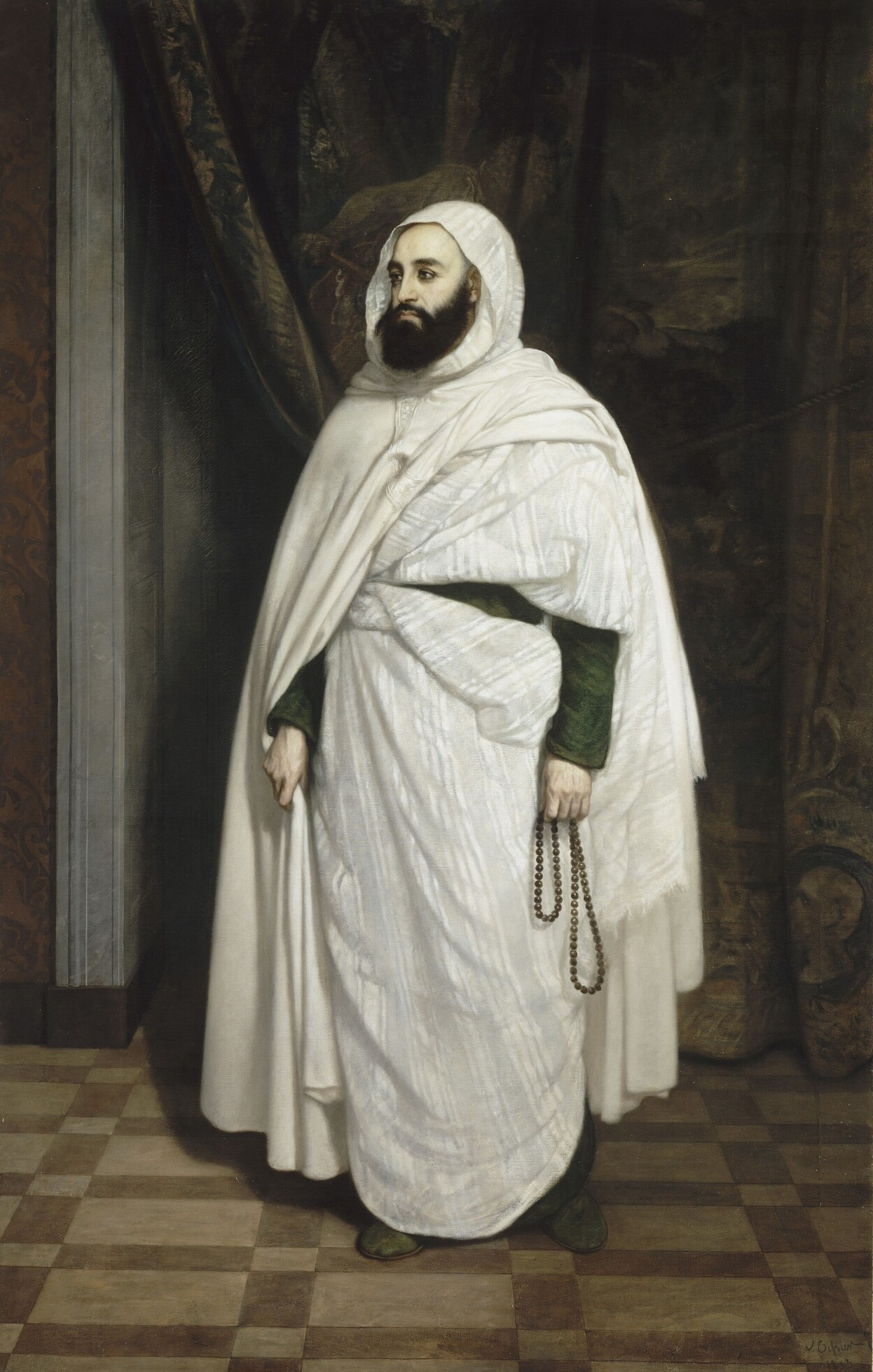
Portrait of Emir Abdelkader by Jean-Baptiste-Ange Tissier

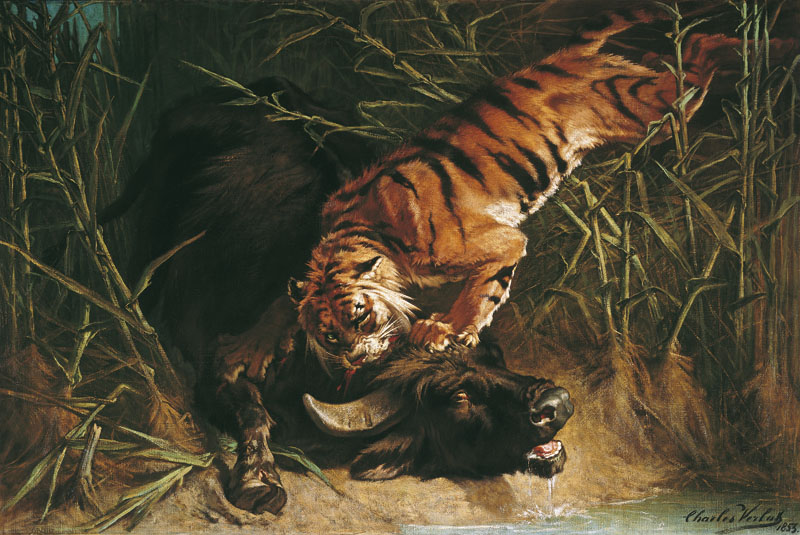
Buffalo Surprised by a Tiger by Charles Verlat

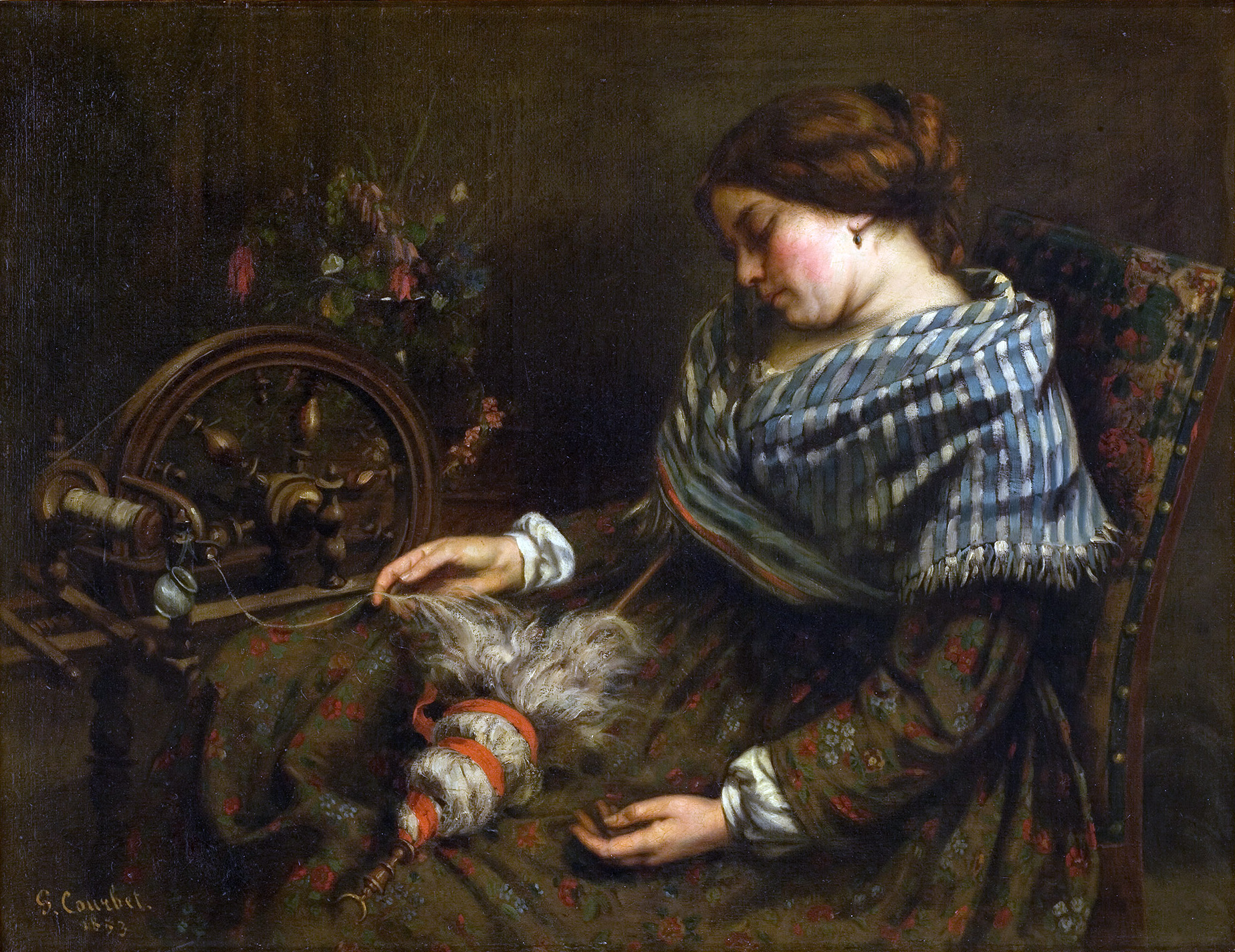
The Sleeping Spinner by Gustave Courbet

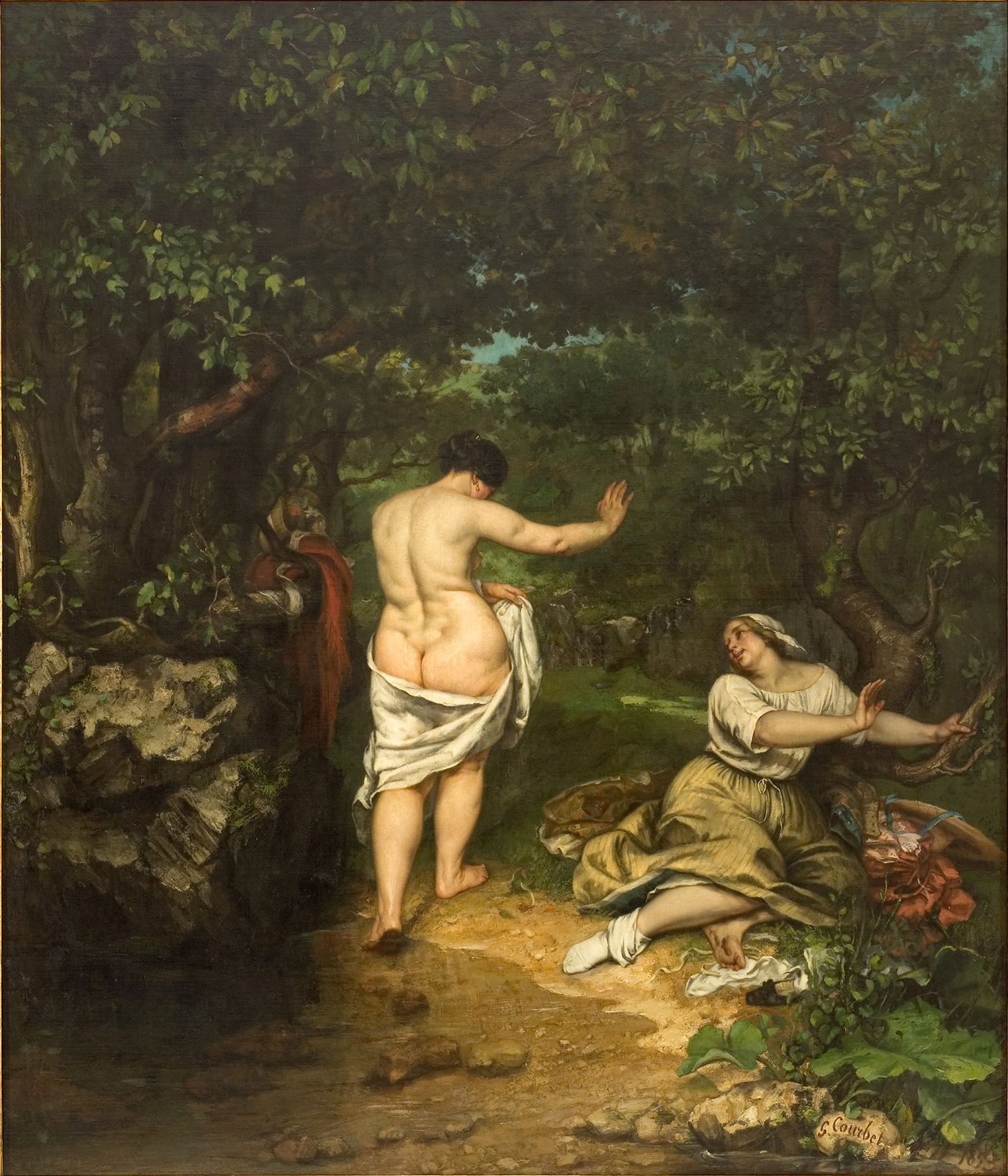
The Bathers by Gustave Courbet

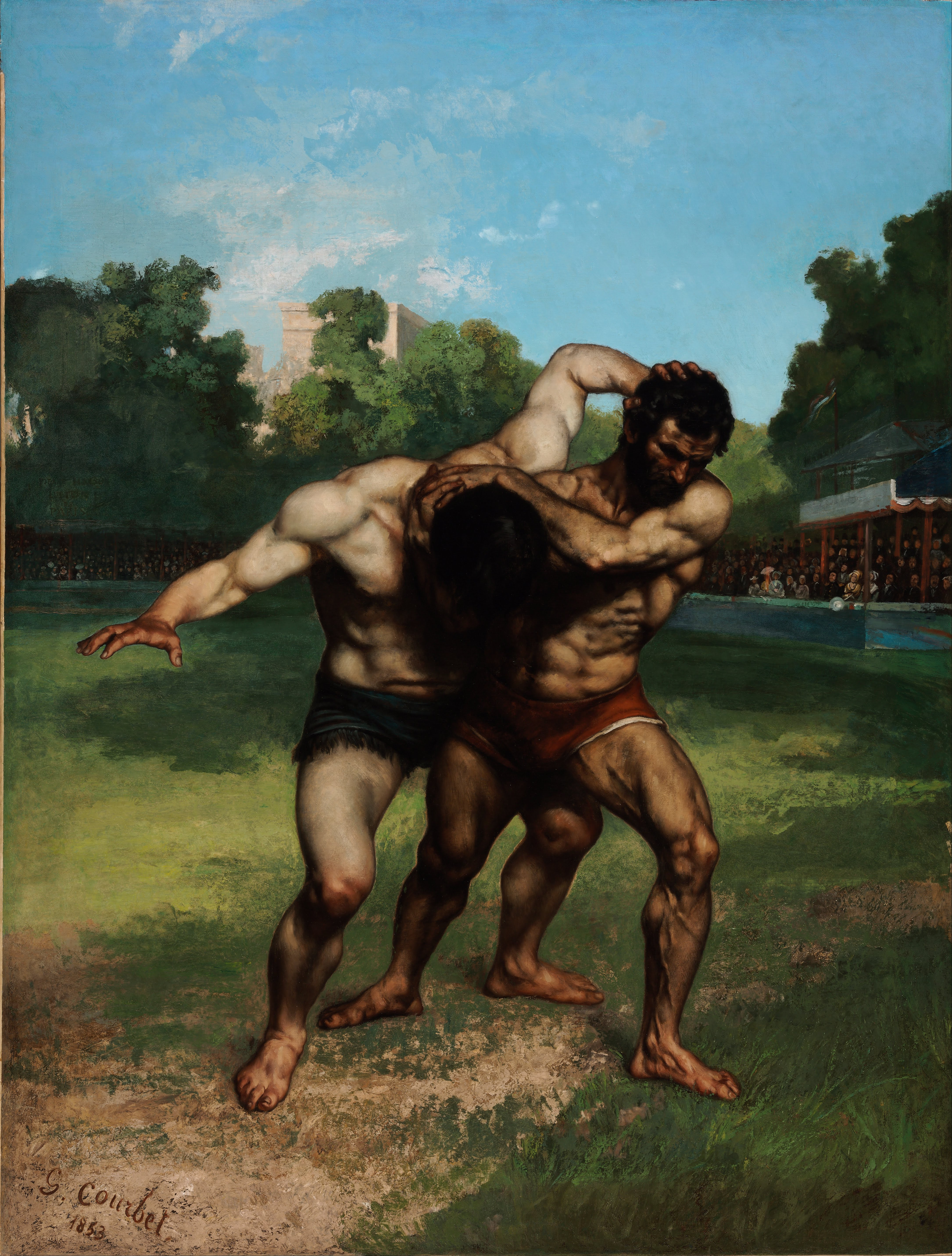
The Wrestlers by Gustave Courbet

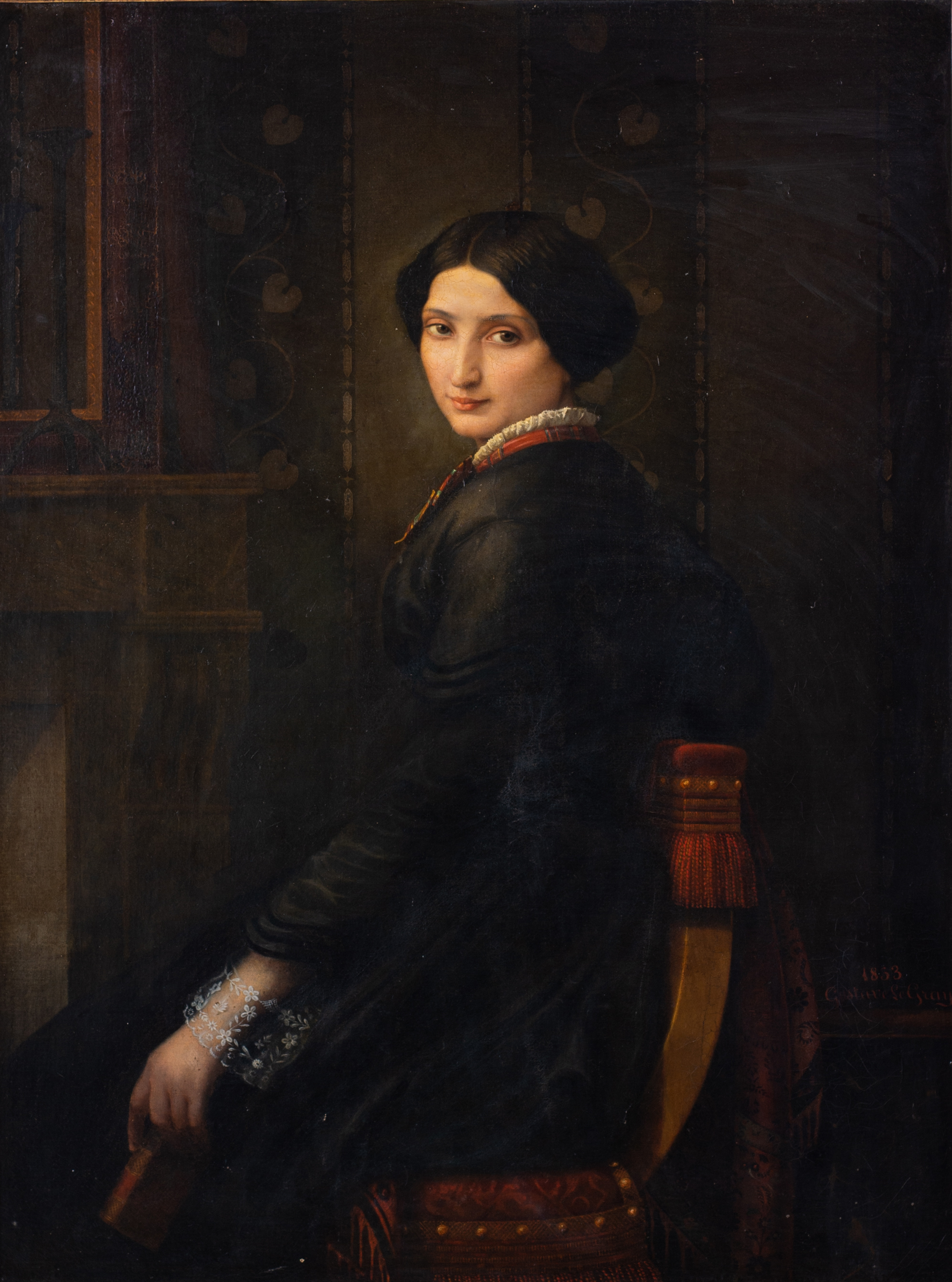
Portrait of Palmira Maddalena Gertrude Leonardi by Gustave Le Gray

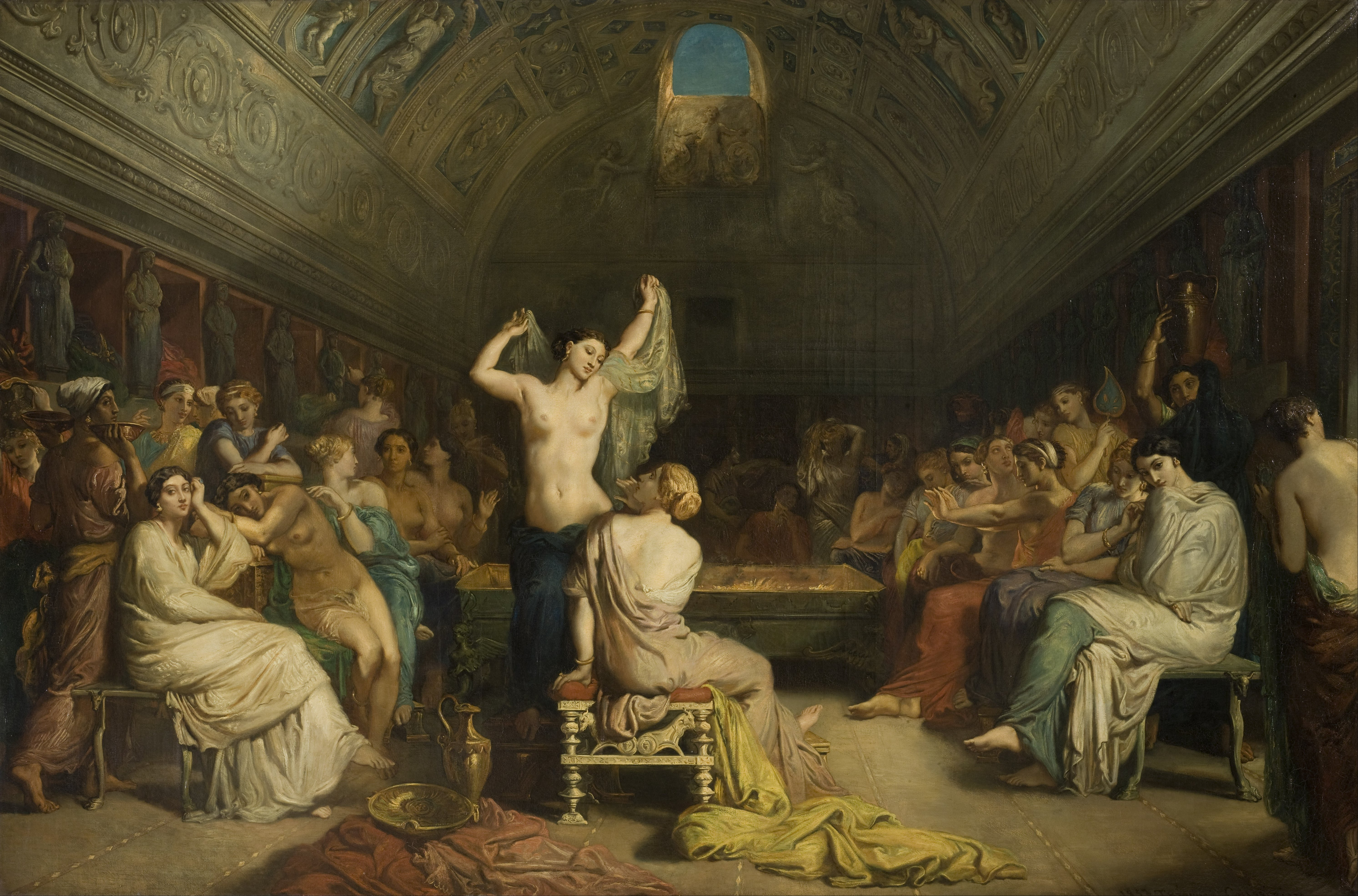
Tepidarium by Théodore Chassériau

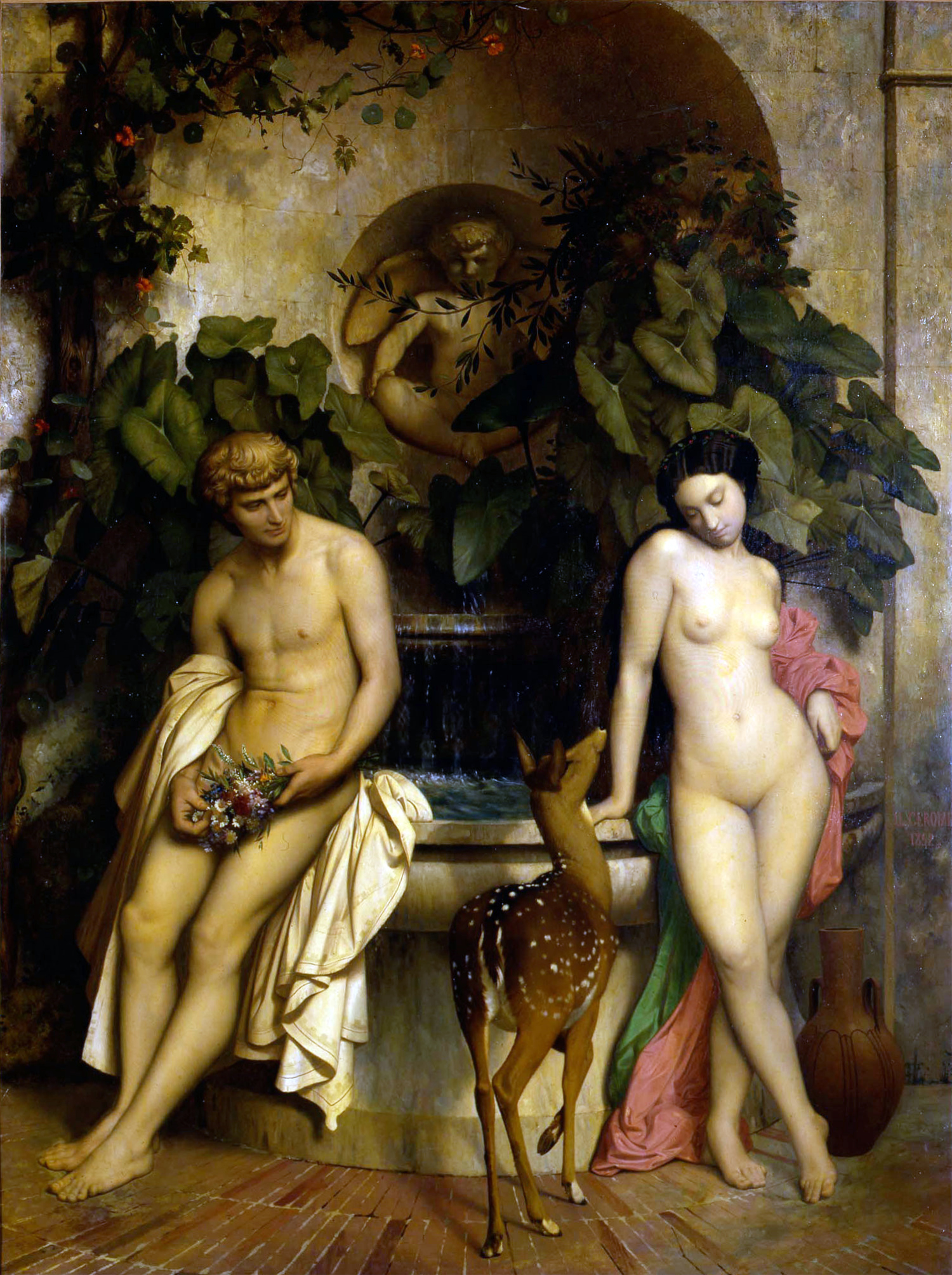
The Idyll by Jean-Léon Gérôme

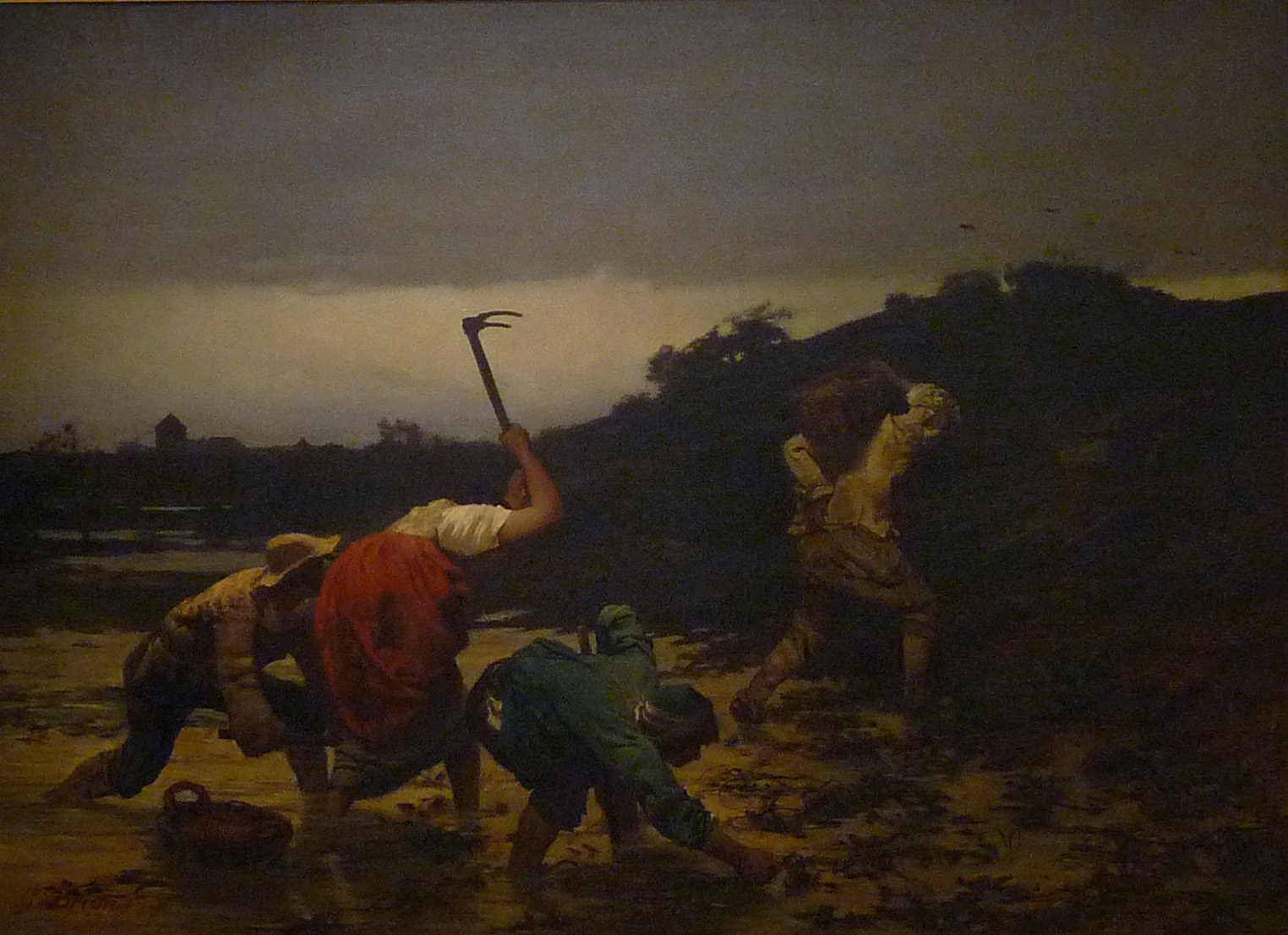
Harvesting Potatoes During the Rhine Flood of 1852 by Gustave Brion

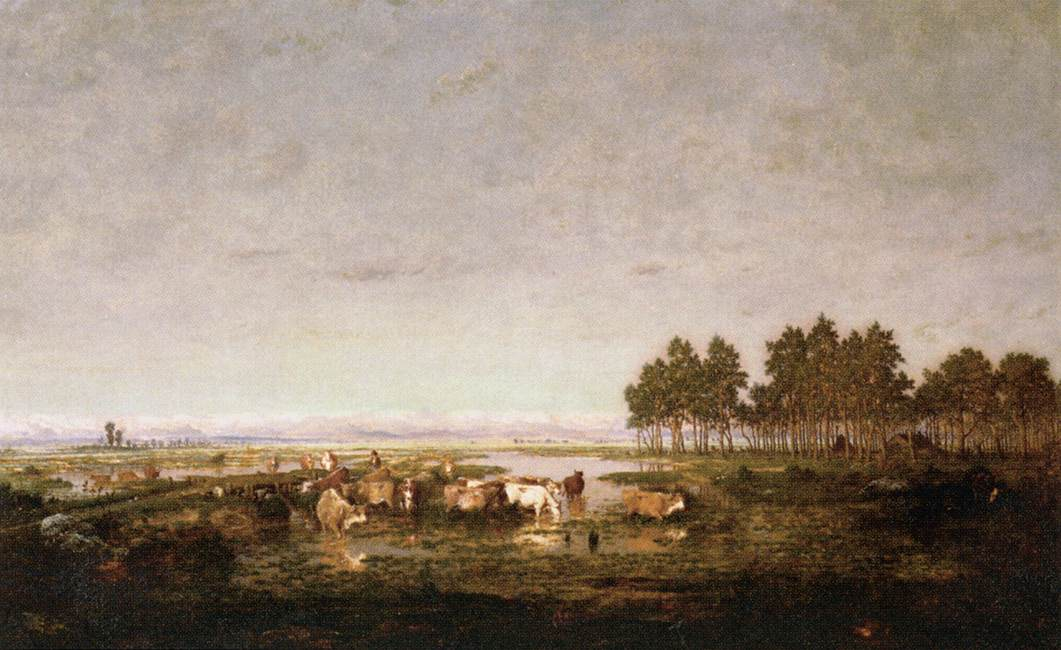
A Marsh in the Landes by Théodore Rousseau

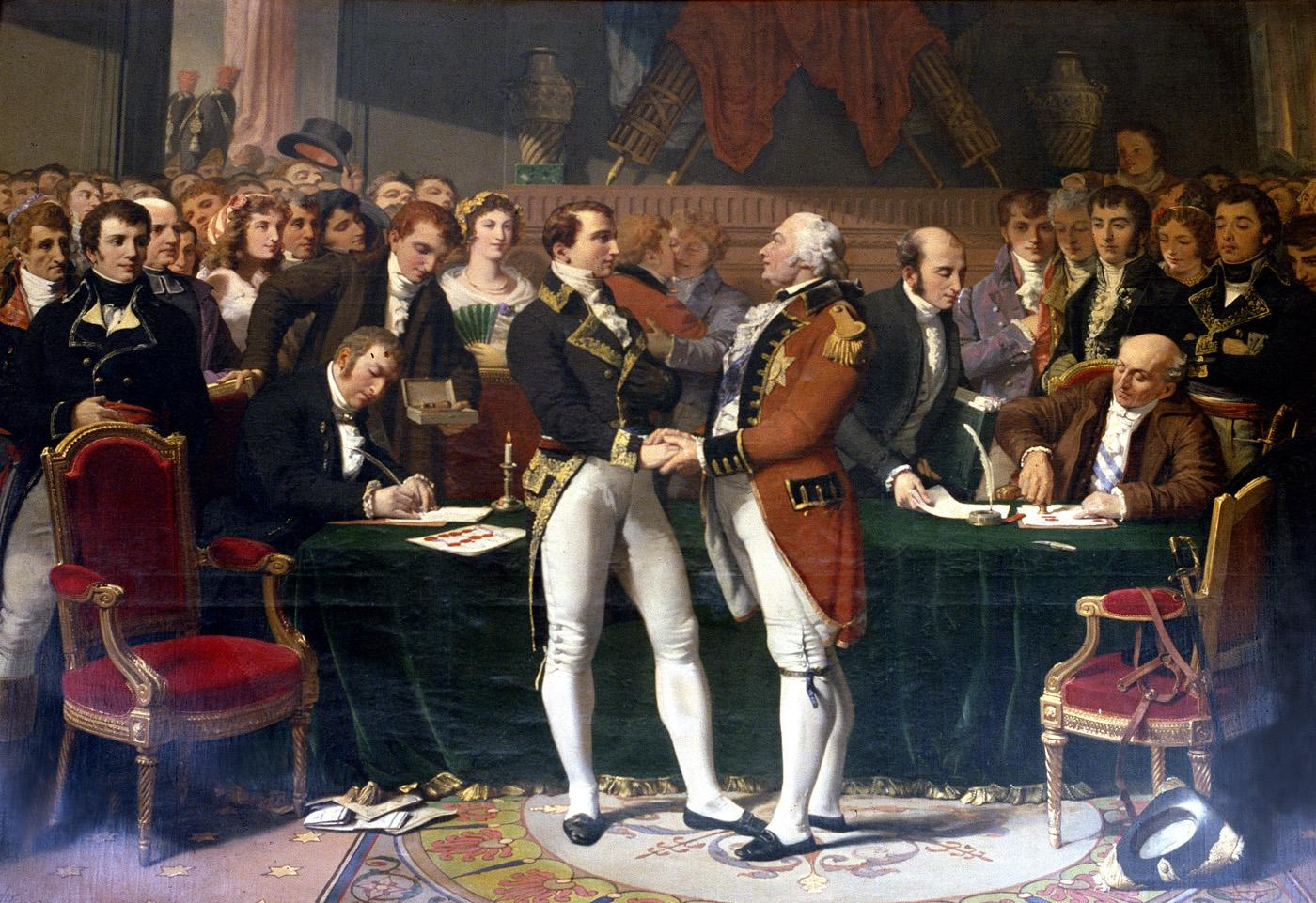
The Peace of Amiens by Jules-Claude Ziegler

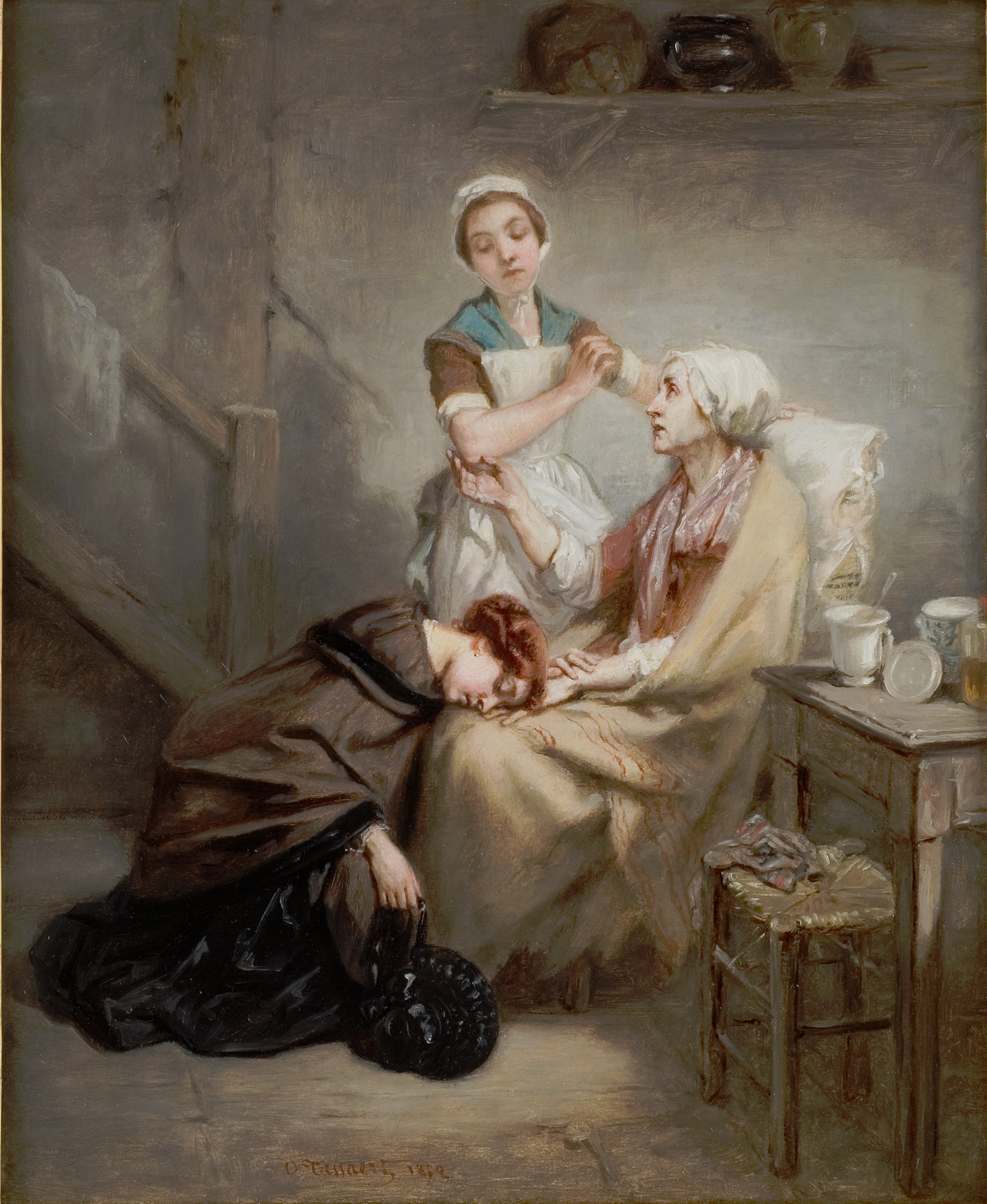
The Return to the Village by Octave Tassaert

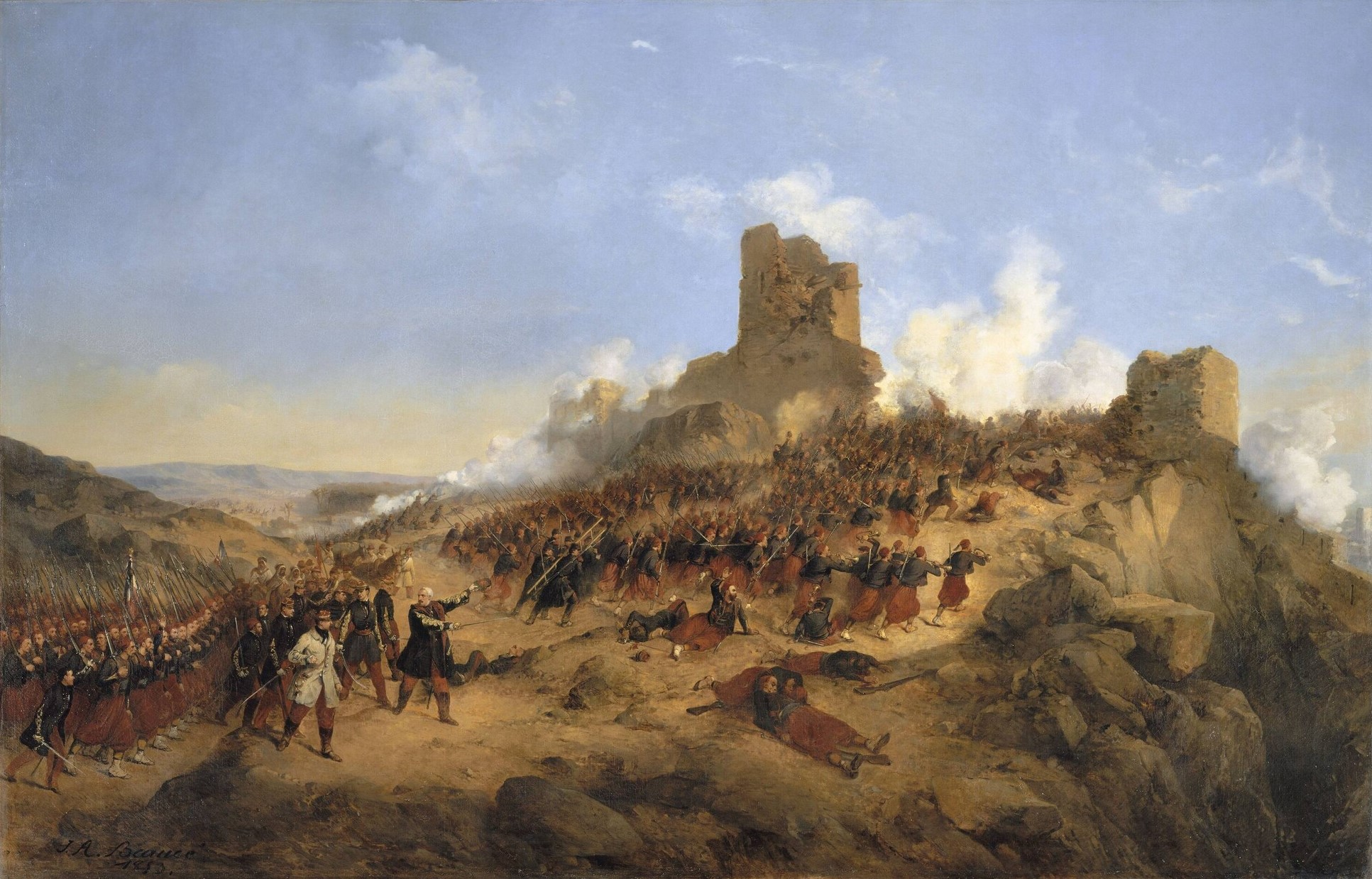
The Assault on Laghouat by Jean-Adolphe Beaucé

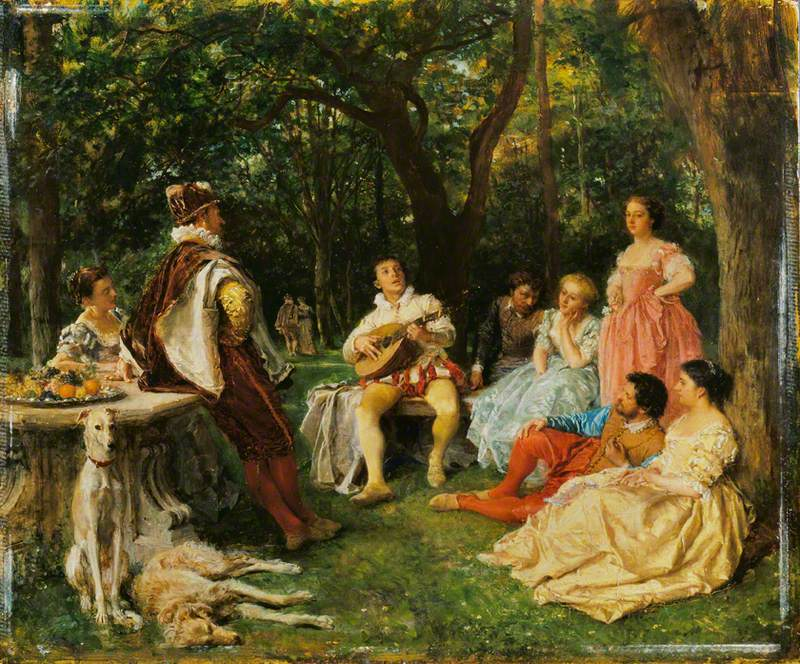
The Recital by Ernest Meissonier

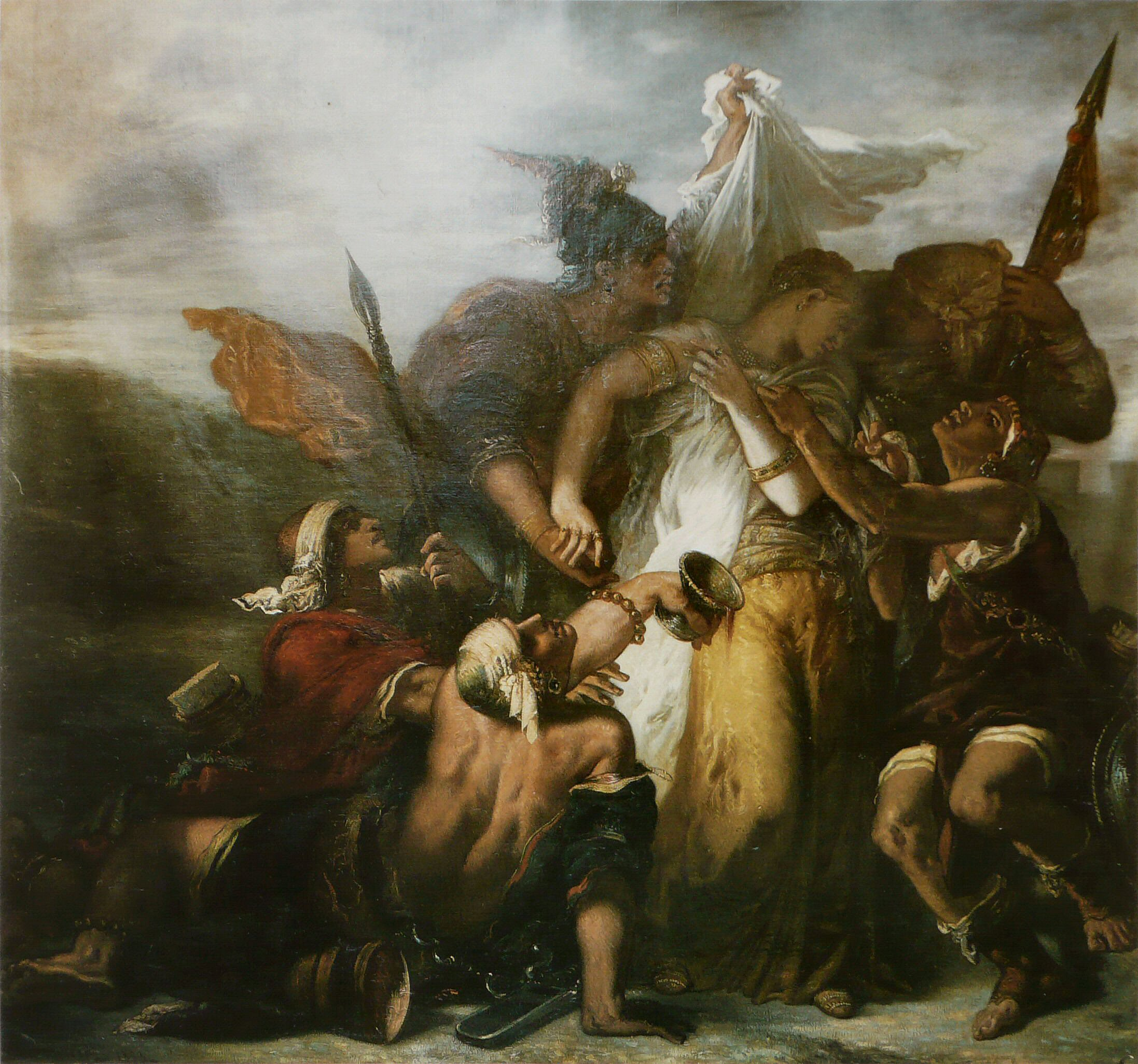
The Song of Songs by Gustave Moreau

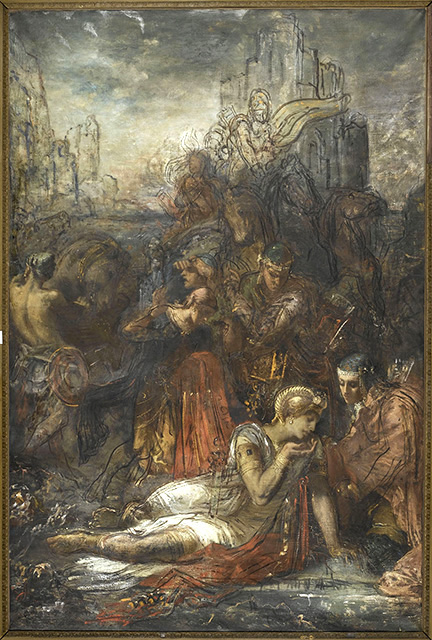
Darius Fleeing After the Battle of Arbela by Gustave Moreau

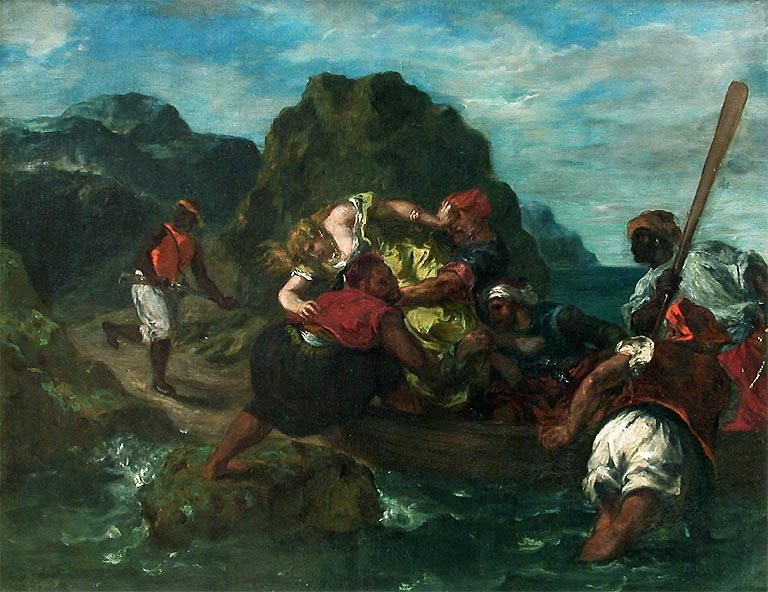
Pirates africains enlevant une jeune femme by Eugène Delacroix

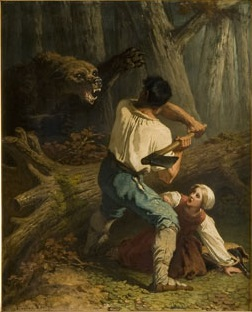
Battle of Life and Death by Charles Verlat

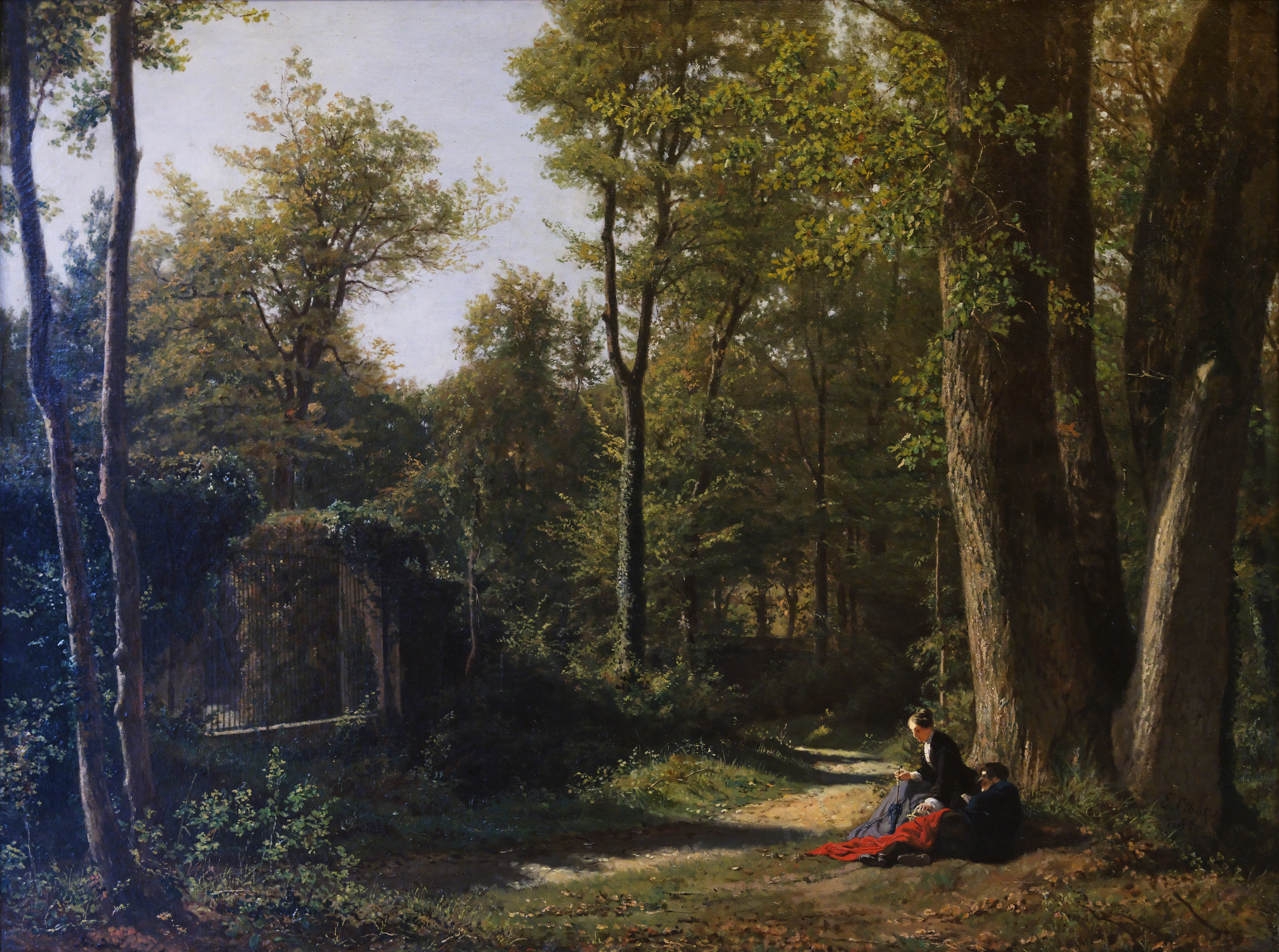
View taken in Bellevue, near Meudon by Édouard Cibot

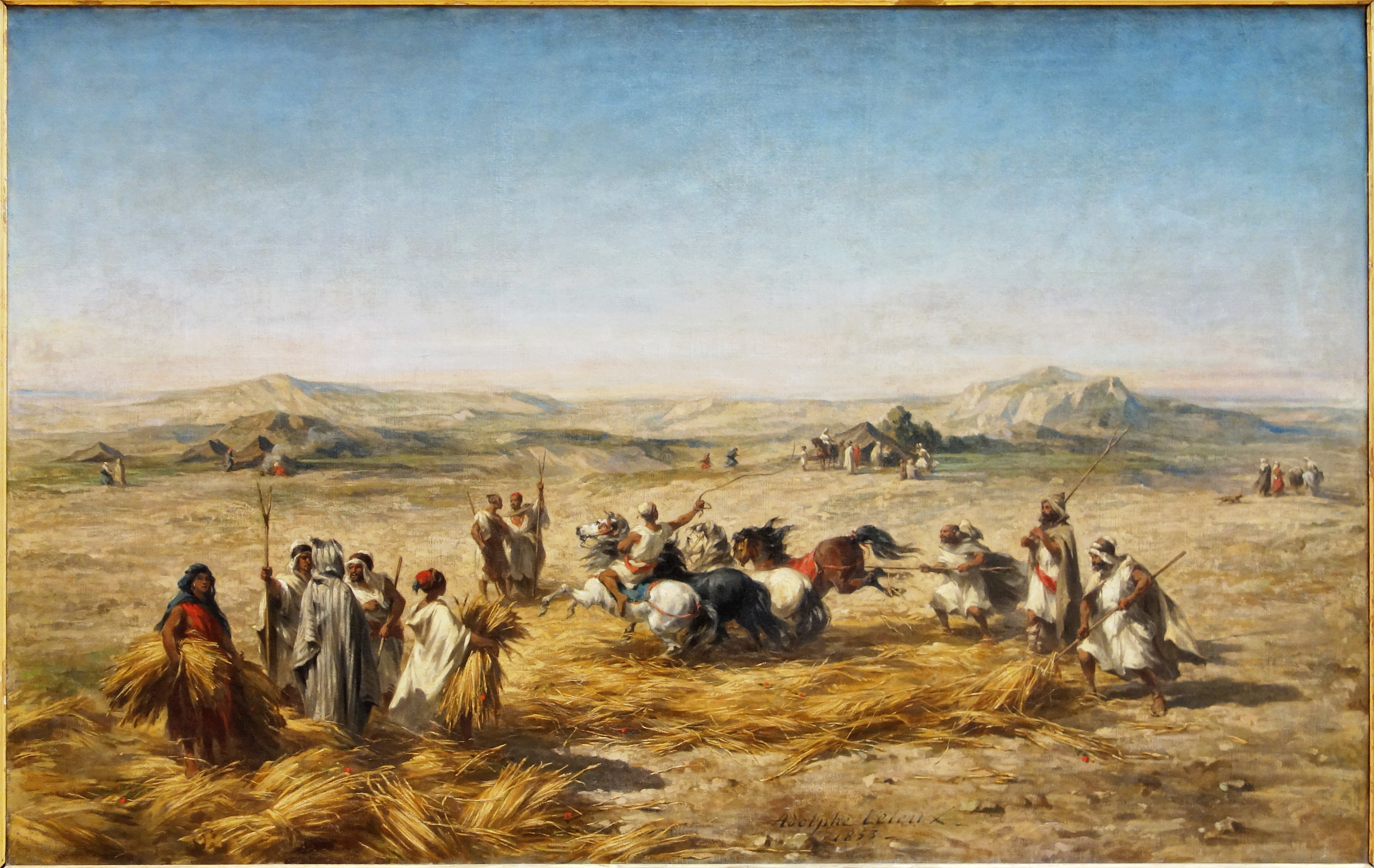
Threshing Wheat in Algeria by Adolphe Pierre Leleux

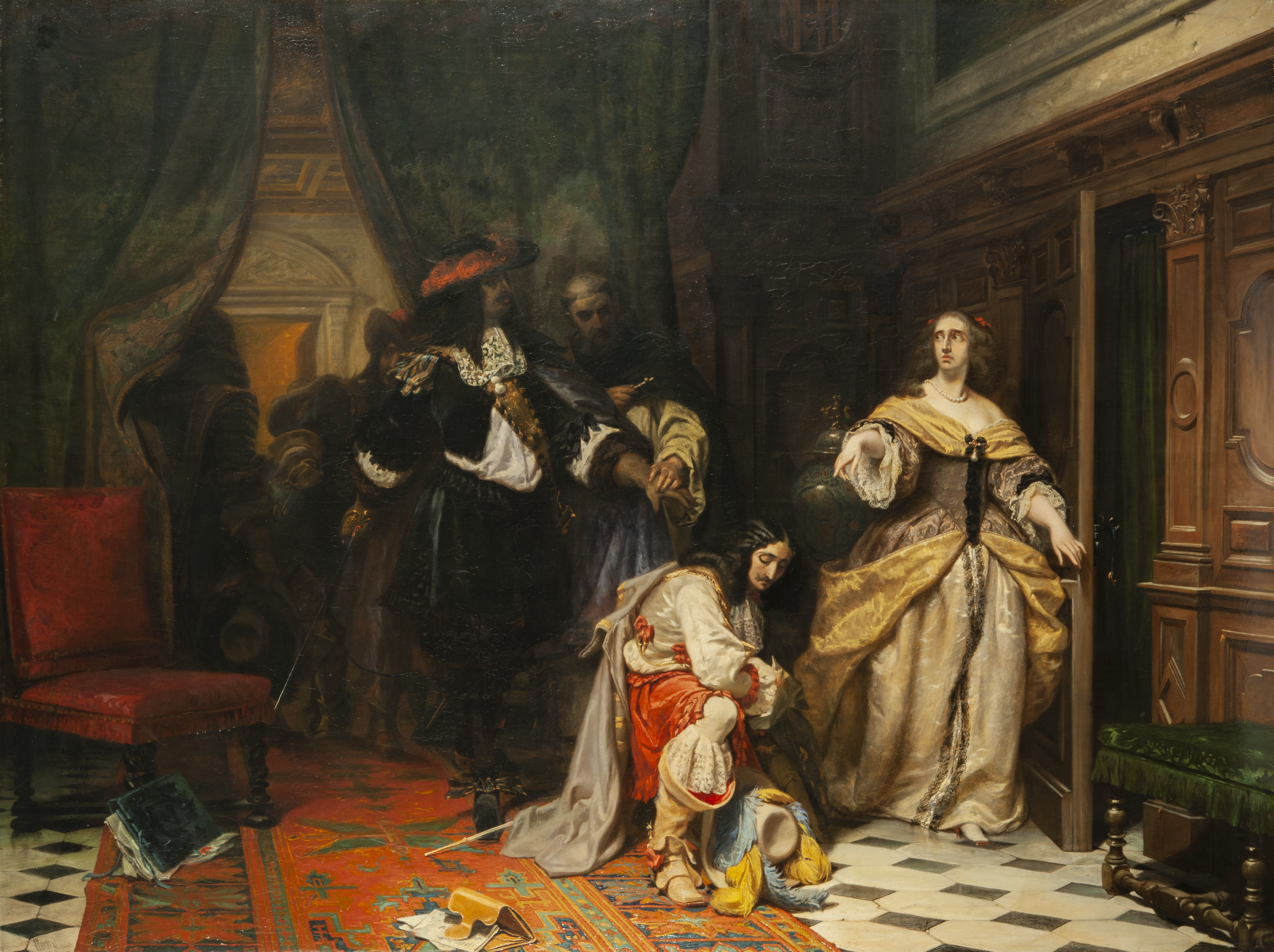
Queen Christina and Monaldeschi by Johan Fredrik Höckert

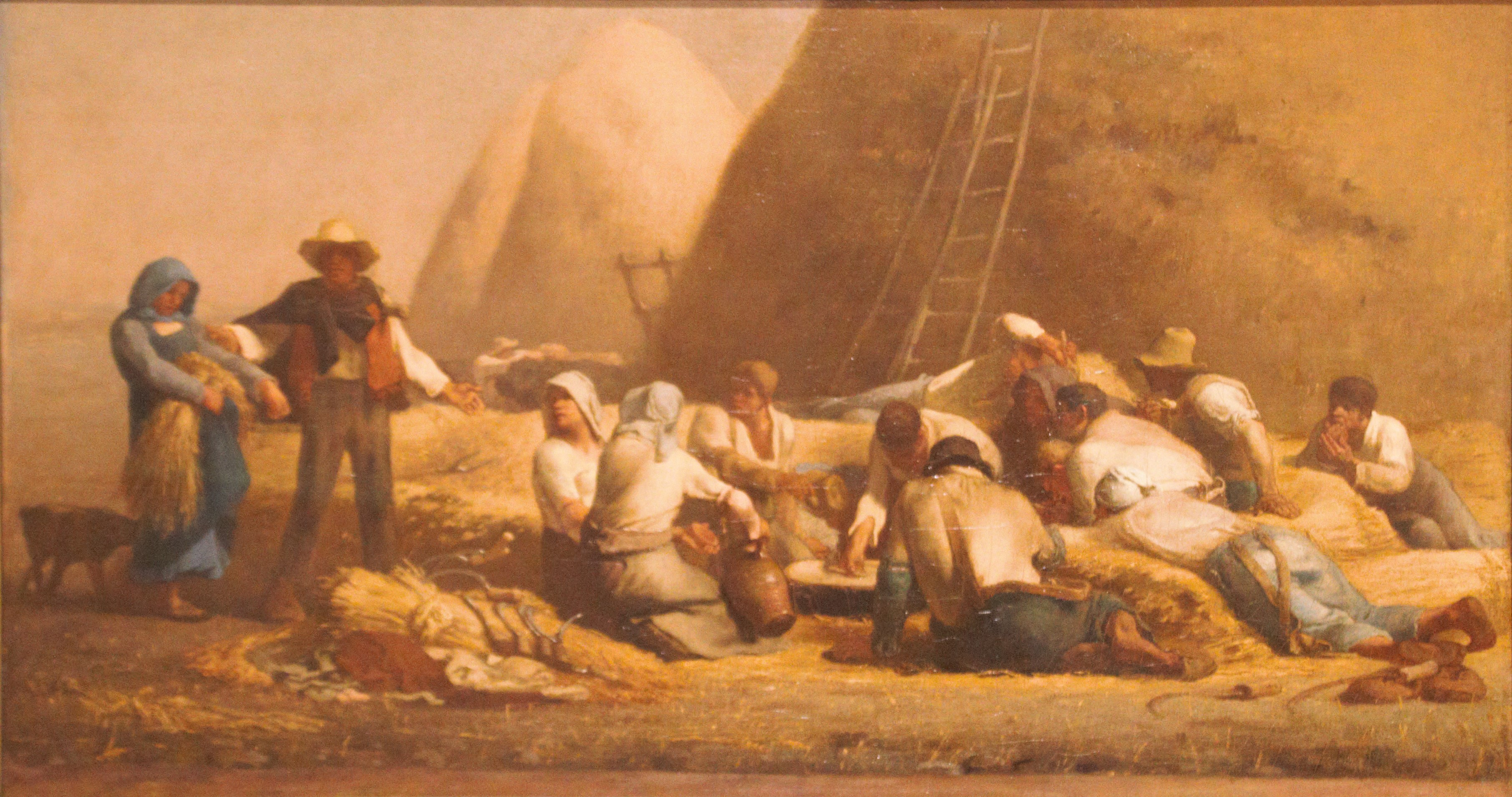
Harvesters Resting (Ruth and Boaz) by Jean-François Millet

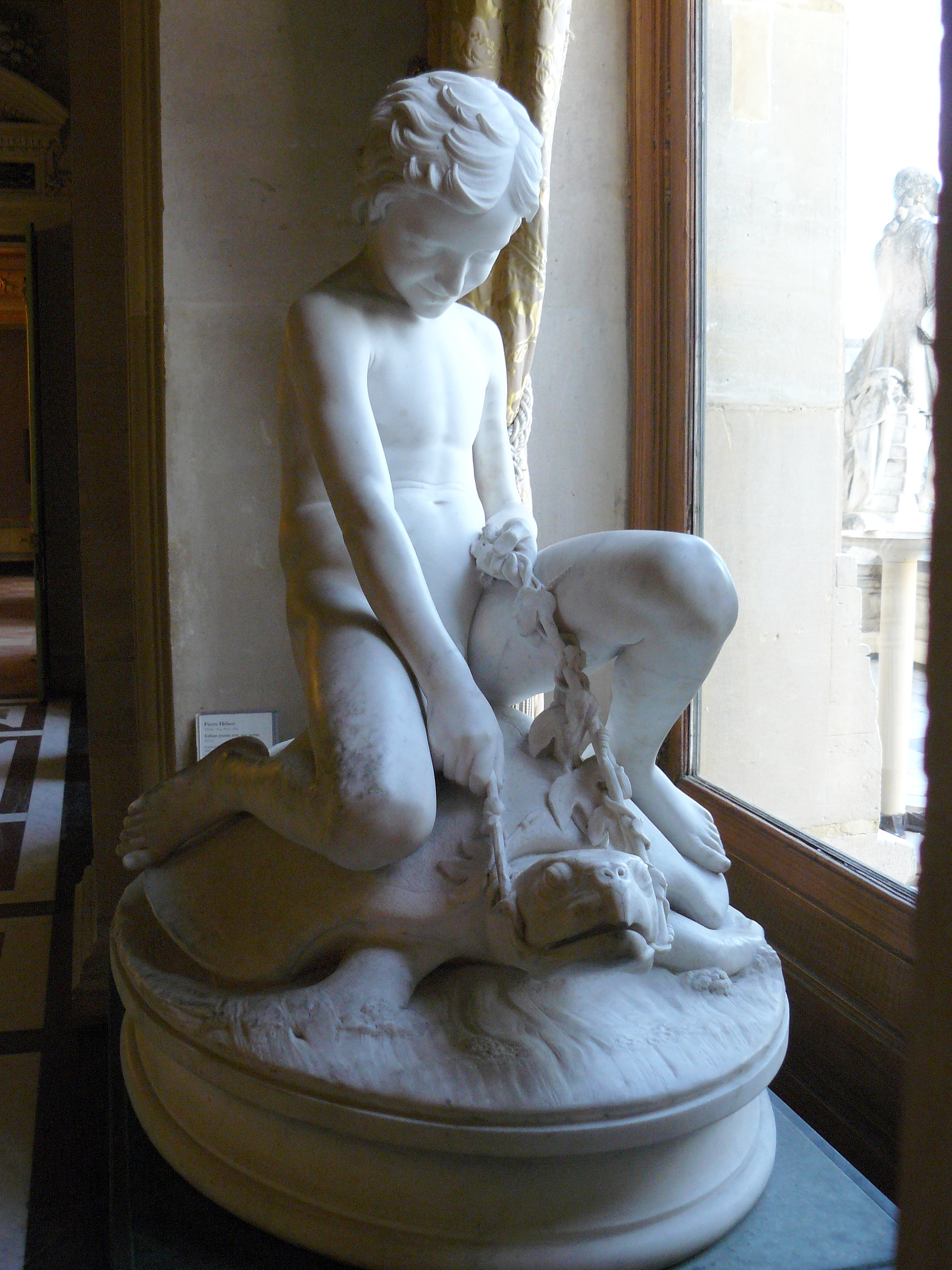
A Child Playing with a Turtle by Pierre Hébert

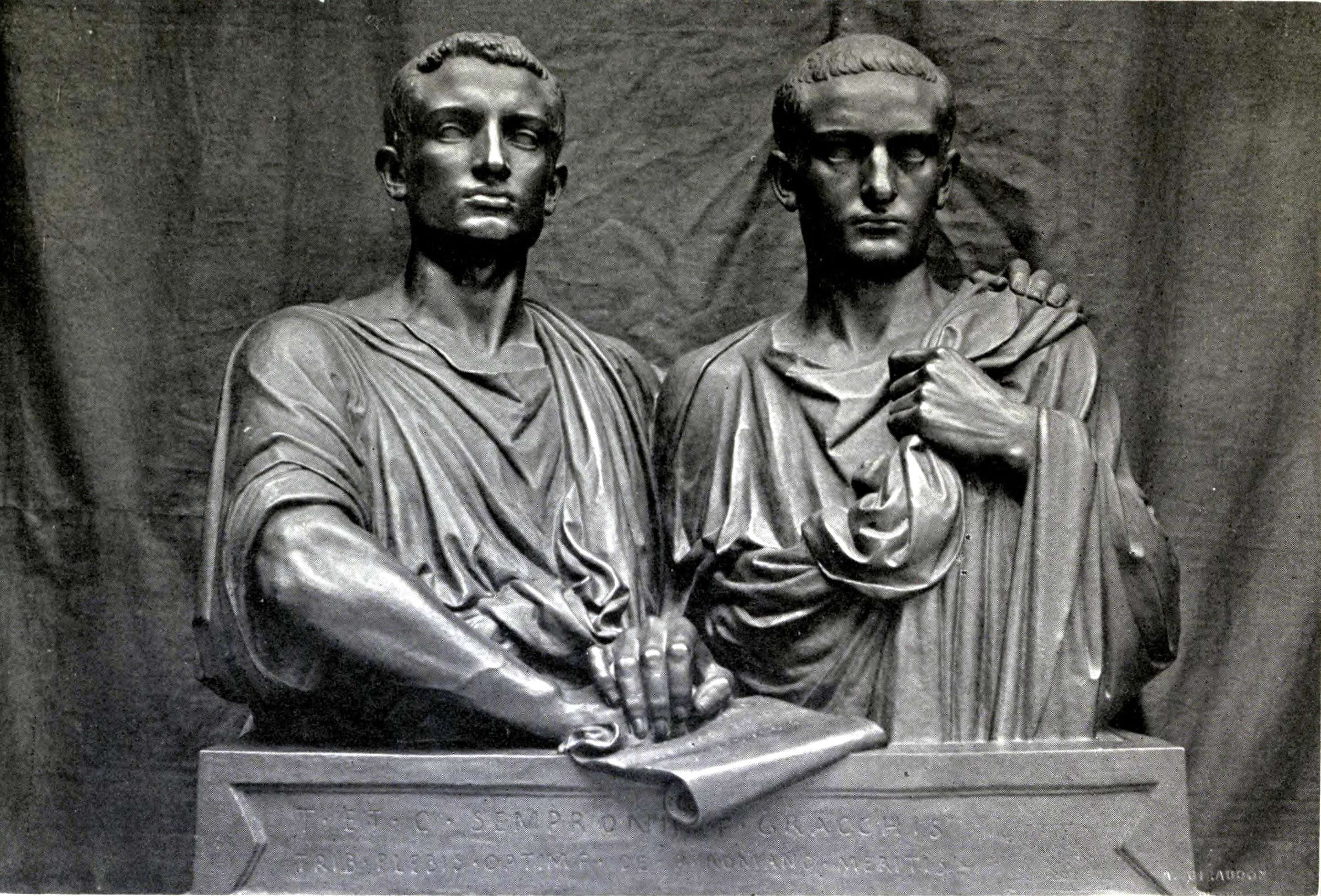
Les Gracques by Eugène Guillaume

== See also ==
- Royal Academy Exhibition of 1853, held at the National Gallery in London

== Bibliography ==
- Eitner, Lorenz. French Paintings of the Nineteenth Century: Before impressionism. National Gallery of Art, 2000.
- Galitz, Kathryn Calley. Masterpieces of European Painting, 1800-1920, in the Metropolitan Museum of Art. Metropolitan Museum of Art, 2007.
- McQueen, Alison. Empress Eugénie and the Arts: Politics and Visual Culture in the Nineteenth Century. Routledge, 2017.
- Tinterow, Gary. Corot. Metropolitan Museum of Art, 1996.
