= The Sleeping Spinner =

Painting by Gustave Courbet

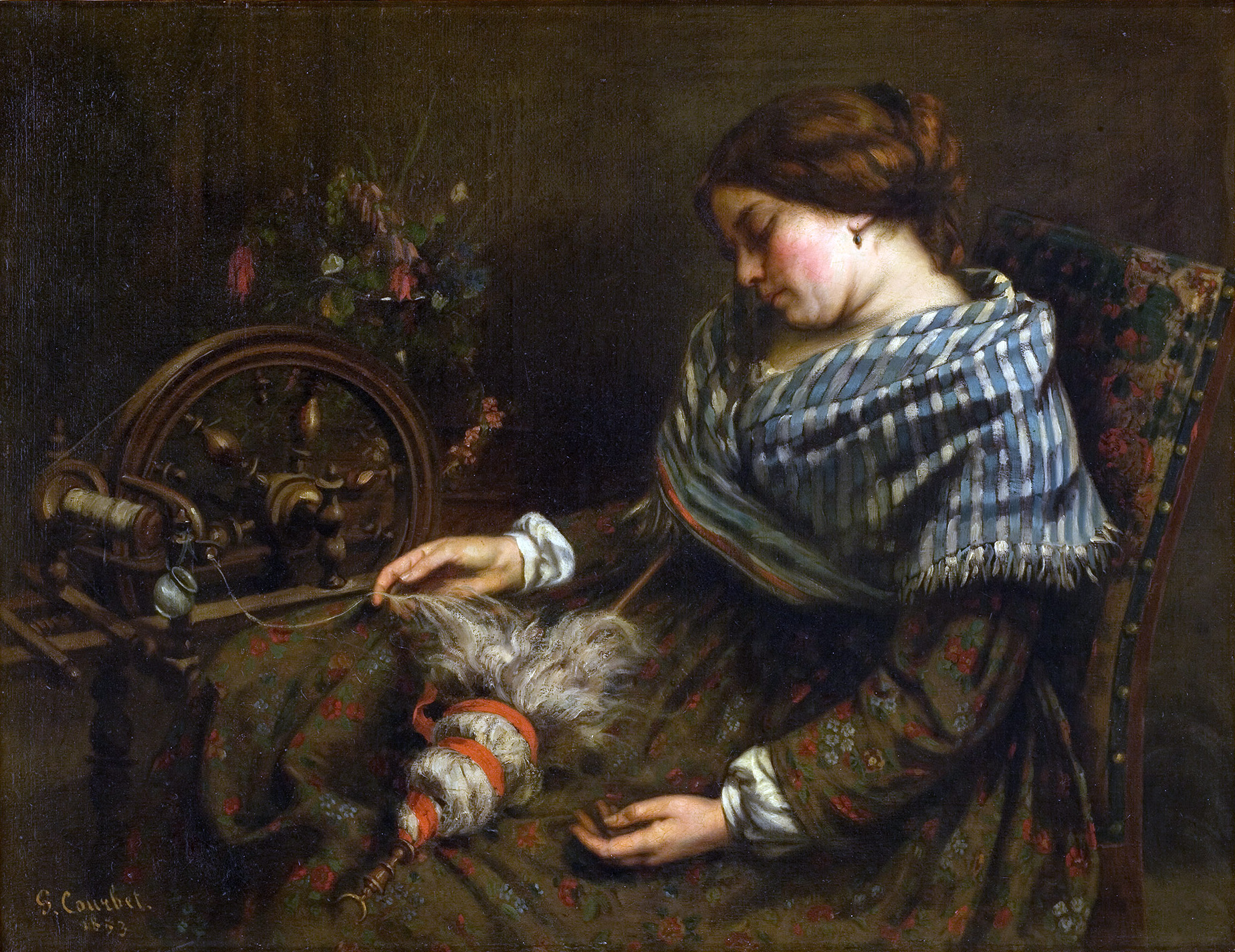
- Artist: Gustave Courbet
- Year: 1853
- Type: Oil on canvas, genre painting
- Dimensions: 89 cm × 117 cm (35 in × 46 in)
- Location: Musée Fabre, Montpellier

The Sleeping Spinner (French: La Fileuse endormie) is an 1853 genre painting by the French artist Gustave Courbet. It depicts a woman who has fallen asleep at her spinning wheel with a distaff in her lap. Her slack fingers loosely hold the linen (flax) thread she'd been spinning before she nodded off. The model has been described as the artist's sister Zélie, but considerable doubt remains about this.

The painting was displayed at the Salon of 1853 in Paris. It also featured during the Salon of 1855, part of the Exposition Universelle. Today it is in the collection of the Musée Fabre in Montpellier, having been acquired donated by Alfred Bruyas in 1868.

== Bibliography ==
- Eitner, Lorenz. An Outline of 19th Century European Painting: From David Through Cezanne. Routledge, 2021.
- Lindsay, Jack. Gustave Courbet: His Life and Art. Adams and Dart, 1973.
- Masanès, Fabrice. Gustave Courbet, 1819-1877: The Last of the Romantics. Taschen, 2006.
- Riat, Georges. Gustave Courbet. Parkstone International, 2012.
