= The Bathers (Courbet) =

1853 painting by Gustave Courbet

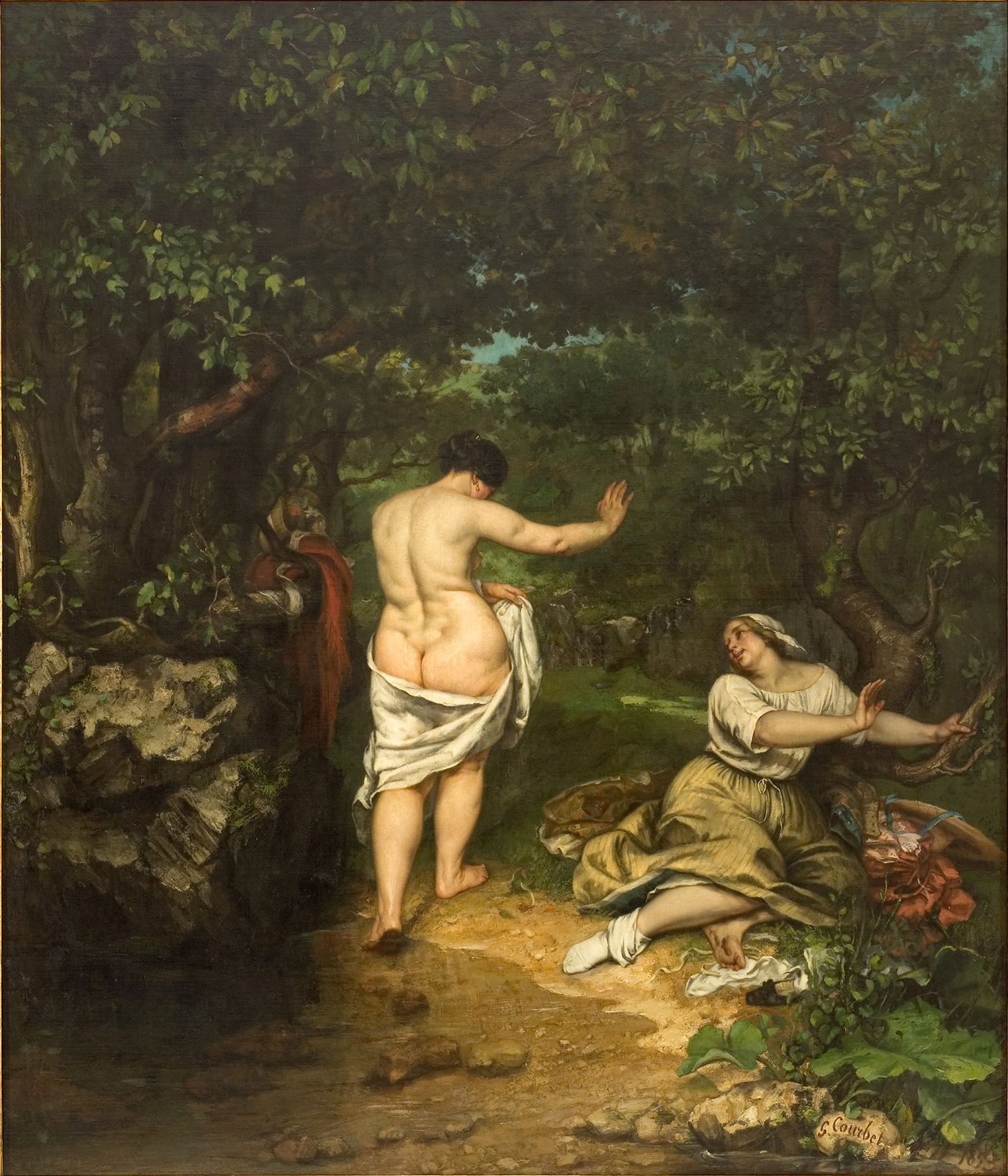
- Artist: Gustave Courbet
- Year: 1853
- Medium: Oil on canvas
- Dimensions: 227 cm × 193 cm (89 in × 76 in)
- Location: Musée Fabre, Montpellier

The Bathers is an oil-on-canvas painting by the French artist Gustave Courbet, first exhibited at the Paris Salon of 1853, where it caused a major scandal. It was unanimously attacked by art critics for the large nude woman at its centre and the sketchy landscape background, both against official artistic canons. It was bought for 3000 francs by Courbet's future friend Alfred Bruyas, an art collector – this acquisition allowed the artist to become financially and artistically independent. It is signed and dated in the bottom right hand corner on a small rock. It has been in the musée Fabre in Montpellier since 1868.

== History ==
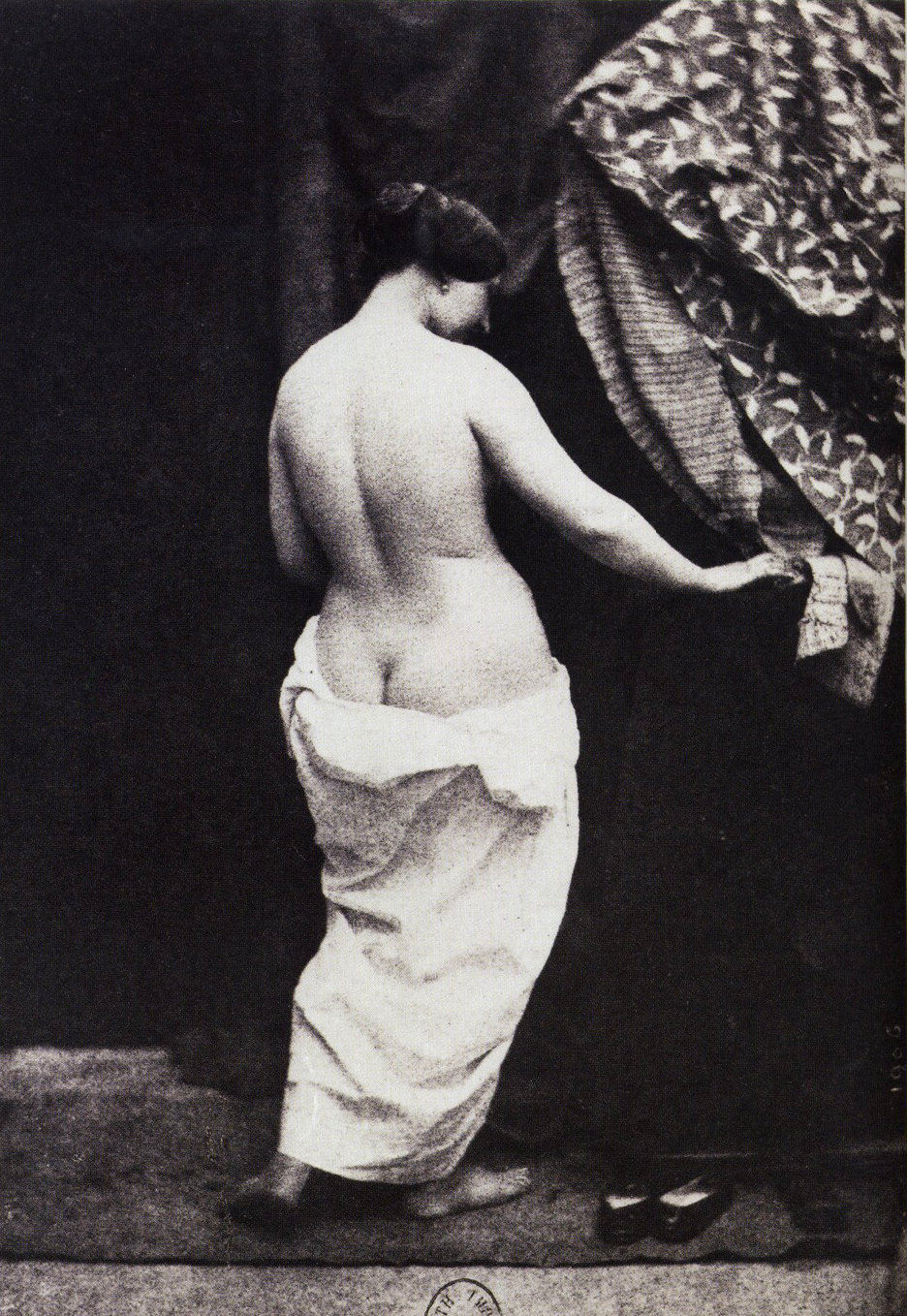
Étude d'après nature, nu n°1906 (1854) by Julien Vallou de Villeneuve – the photograph inspired the central figure in Courbet's work.

The painter had already experienced his first successes in France, Belgium and Germany, with some major figures of the Second French Republic buying his works. He had won a medal and resumed exhibitions at the Paris Salon. In summer 1852 he returned to the female nude, which he had previously treated in The Bacchante (possibly 1847) and Sleeping Blonde Woman (1849, private collection), the latter of which included a similar figure to the central figure in The Bathers.

Almost 34, Courbet wrote to his parents on 13 May 1853:

My paintings are received by the jury these days without any kind of objection. I am considered as let in by the public and beyond judgement. They have finally left responsibility for my paintings up to me. I annex ground every day. All Paris is waiting to see them and to hear the noise they will make. As for The Bathers, it's a bit scary, but since then I've added a cloth over the buttocks. The landscape in this painting is generally successful.

Despite his reassurances he also wrote of wanting more success in a similar way in a letter to his parents dated May 1852 – "annex" is a translation of "empiète", a military term. As he hoped, the work caused a scandal at the next Salon on 15 May 1853. It had a prime position in the hang, at eye-height unlike its pendant The Wrestlers. The rendering was very different to the more accepted style established by Ingres and the female nude did not fit the then-current ideals of Romantic and Neoclassical painting. The poet and critic Théophile Gautier wrote in La Presse on 21 July that in The Bathers he saw "a kind of Hottentot Venus getting out of the water, and turning towards the spectator a monstrous rump with padded dimples at the bottom which only lack the mark of passementerie". Gautier thus contrasted a civilised classical Venus with what he saw as the uncivilised African savagery of Courbet's image.

Distancing himself from Titian and Rubens, Courbet had broken the artistic hierarchy of genres, combining a naked ordinary woman within a landscape of the Franche-Comté to make a scene of everyday life. Such a combination had first been attempted at the start of the 17th century by the Le Nain brothers, who had shown posing peasants looking at the viewer, and by painters of the Dutch and Flemish Golden Ages. The large format was also usually then reserved for religious and mythological paintings and portraits of princes. France's rising urban population also made intellectuals wish both to reject the rural world and to idealise it in a pseudo-pantheistic fashion.

The art critic Jules Champfleury attempted to provoke George Sand by addressing a polemical letter to her – this was published in L'Artiste on 2 September 1855 and included an account of his first encounter with the painting, quoting the philosopher Pierre-Joseph Proudhon's 1853 La Philosophie du progrès:

The image of vice, just as much as that of virtue, is the domain of painting and poetry: following the lesson which the artist wants to give, every figure, beautiful or ugly, can fulfil the aim of art. [...] Let the people, recognising their misery, learn to blush at their cowardice and to detest tyrants; let the aristocracy, exposed in its greasy and obscene nudity, be whipped on every muscle for its parasitic nature, its insolence and its corruption. [...] And let every generation, putting on canvas or marble the secret of its genius, be left to posterity without blame or apology for its artists' works

Courbet and Proudhon were from the same region of France, but this defence betrays a misunderstanding of the work of Courbet, who did not want to spend his life painting rural people or attacking the middle classes. The work was also caricatured by Cham in Le Charivari.

== X-ray ==
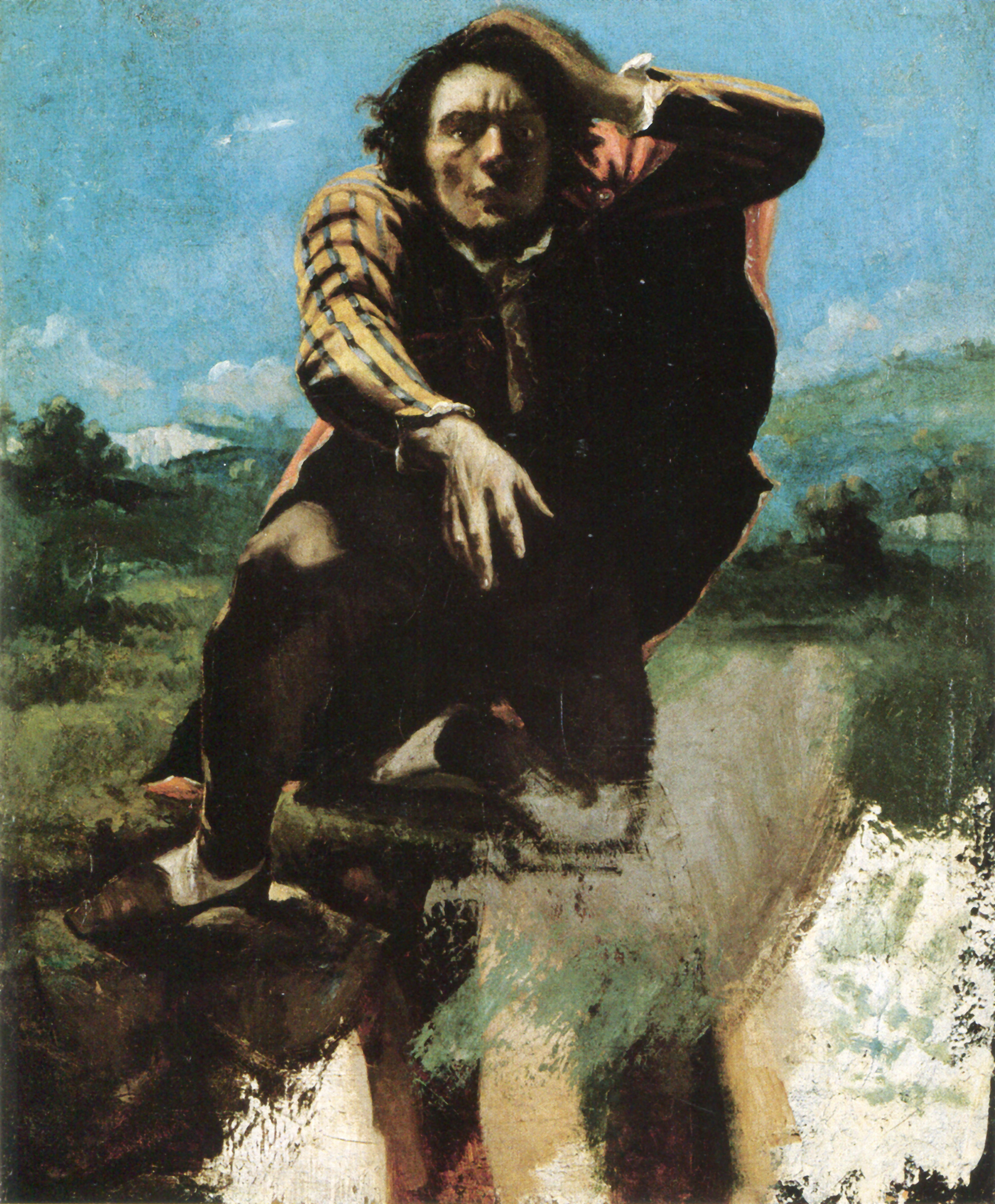
The Man Made Mad with Fear, incomplete and unsigned sketch, c. 1843–1846 (National Gallery (Norway))

The Centre de recherche et de restauration des musées de France X-rayed the canvas to see its underdrawing. This showed up the earliest composition for the work, in which a nude woman faced the viewer and pointed at a figure getting up on the right, probably a motif borrowed from a Perseus Delivering Andromeda which Courbet had copied in a museum. That composition was covered by a well-finished scene showing a lifesize figure in a striped costume with his hand in his hair and seemingly hallucinating as he throws himself off a precipice, with Death personified as a skeleton at the base waiting for him. A sketch of that work survives – Courbet was already working on it in April 1845 but abandoned it in January 1846. Seven years later he reused the canvas for The Bathers.

== Bibliography ==
- des Cars, Laurence; de Font-Réauls, Dominique; Tinterow, Gary; Hilaire, Michel (2007). Gustave Courbet : Exposition Paris, New York, Montpellier 2007-2008 (Exhibition catalogue) (in French). Réunion des musées nationaux. ISBN 978-2-7118-5297-0.
- (in French) Bruno Foucart, Courbet, Paris, Flammarion, coll. « Les maitres de la peinture moderne », 1977 (OCLC 602545091, notice BnF no FRBNF34592962).
- (in French) James H. Rubin (translated by Xavier Bernard), Courbet, Phaidon, coll. « Art & Idées », 2003 (ISBN 0-7148-9078-2).
