= The Eternal Feminine =

The Eternal Feminine may refer to:

- The Eternal Feminine (Cézanne), an 1877 painting by Paul Cézanne
- The Eternal Feminine (1915 film), an American film directed by George Nichols
- The Eternal Feminine (1931 film), a British film
- The Eternal Feminine (2017 film), a Mexican film
