= The Painter's Studio =

1855 painting by Gustave Courbet

The Painter's Studio: A real allegory summing up seven years of my artistic and moral life
- L'Atelier du peintre. Allégorie réelle déterminant une phase de sept années de ma vie artistique et morale. (French)
- Artist: Gustave Courbet
- Year: 1855
- Medium: Oil on canvas
- Dimensions: 361 cm × 598 cm (142 in × 235 in)
- Location: Musée d'Orsay, Paris

The Painter's Studio (French: L'Atelier du peintre; in full, The Painter's Studio: A real allegory summing up seven years of my artistic and moral life) is an 1855 oil-on-canvas painting by Gustave Courbet. It is located in the Musée d'Orsay in Paris, France.

Courbet painted The Painter's Studio in Ornans, France in 1855. "The world comes to be painted at my studio," said Courbet of the Realist work. The figures in the painting are allegorical representations of various influences on Courbet's artistic life. On the left are human figures from all levels of society. In the center, Courbet works on a landscape, while turned away from a nude model who is a symbol of Academic art. On the right are friends and associates of Courbet, mainly elite Parisian society figures, including Charles Baudelaire, Champfleury, Pierre-Joseph Proudhon, and Courbet's most prominent patron, Alfred Bruyas.

The 1855 Paris World Fair's jury accepted eleven of Courbet's works for the Exposition Universelle, but The Painter's Studio was not among them. In an act of self promotion and defiance, Courbet, with the help of Alfred Bruyas, opened his own exhibition (The Pavilion of Realism) close to the official exposition; this was a forerunner of the various Salon des Refusés. Very little praise was forthcoming, and Eugène Delacroix was one of the few painters who supported the work. Of the painting, Courbet stated that The Painter's Studio "represents society at its best, its worst, and its average."

== Description ==
The painting was produced during Courbet's involvement with Realism in art in the mid-19th century. Due to the short amount of time Courbet had to paint it, many original plans for the work had to be discarded. The most noticeable example of this is in the background of the painting. On the back wall of the studio in the painting, Courbet planned to paint replications of other works of his. He ran out of time to paint these in their entirety, so he then covered them up with a reddish-brown preparation color, leaving the partially-finished paintings still relatively visible.

=== Left side ===
The left side of the painting depicts people of everyday life in France. The Jewish man and the Irishwoman were seen on a trip Courbet took to London in 1848, according to a letter Courbet wrote to Champfleury describing what the painting would look like. There is also a "lay figure"/"crucified figure" directly to the left of Courbet's easel. This figure appears contorted and potentially mangled. Art historians Benedict Nicolson and Georges Riat both interpret this figure as a symbol of the "death" of the art of the Académie des Beaux-Arts in France.

=== Center ===
The center of the painting depicts Courbet painting a landscape, a nude female figure, a young boy, and a white cat. On his canvas, Courbet paints the Loue River valley. This valley in the Franche-Comté region of France is a tribute to Courbet's homeland of Ornans, France. The female figure is based on an 1854 photograph by J. V. de Villeneuve and has been interpreted as a representation of the art of the Academy or as Courbet's Muse for Realism.

=== Right side ===
The right side of the painting depicts a large number of Paris élites, including friends of the artist. These are figures who played a role in the development of Courbet's career as an artist, or who inspired him in some way. Portrayals included on this side of the painting include Alfred Bruyas (a patron of Courbet's), Champfleury, Pierre-Joseph Proudhon, Charles Baudelaire, and a wealthy pair of art collectors, among other prominent society figures. A majority of these portraits were copied from previous portraits or from photographs, since the painting was entirely made in Ornans but the subjects on this side of the painting resided in Paris. For example, the portrait of Charles Baudelaire was directly copied from Courbet's 1847 portrait of the writer. Courbet was in written correspondence with Champfleury in regards to this painting (from which much of the interpretation of The Painter's Studio is derived) and requested a photograph of Proudhon, the philosopher and anarchist, so that he could be included in the painting. It is the photograph Courbet received from Champfleury on which Proudhon's portrait is based.

== Interpretations ==
- The meaning of the oxymoron "real allegory" in the subtitle of the painting, as well as Courbet's intent in conjuring this phrase, is debated.
- Courbet chose to paint the Loué River Valley on his canvas-within-a-canvas as an act of defiant provincialism. He sought to bring a symbol of his home in the Doubs department of the Franche-Comté region of France straight into the heart of Paris and the eyes of Paris' socialite art viewers and collectors.
- The skull that rests on a copy of the Journal des débats is a symbol of the death of the art of the Academy.
- The cluster of items at the foot of the hunter (on the left), including a guitar, a dagger, a plumed hat, and a buckled shoe, is a symbol of the death of the Romantic art movement. It could be a symbol of the death of Romanticism due to the rising popularity of Realism, or a symbol of the death of Romanticism in Courbet's own oeuvre.
- Linda Nochlin reads the painting as demonstrative of Courbet's investment in Fourierism, a communitarian model of social reorganization.
