= Gustav Rau =

Gustav Rau may refer to:

- Gustav Rau (art collector) (1922–2002), German doctor, philanthropist and art collector
- Gustav Rau (athlete) (1878–?), German athlete
- Gustav Rau (hippologist) (1880–1954), German hippologist
