= Jules Simon Troubat =

Jules Simon Troubat (1836–1914) was a French littérateur, born at Montpellier. He was the last secretary of Sainte-Beuve, one of his testamentary executors, and his legatee. He published a number of posthumous works of Sainte-Beuve, such as his Correspondance, an unfinished monograph on Proudhon, and three volumes of articles originally contributed to the Premiers lundis. Troubat himself wrote:

- Souvenirs et indiscrétions (1875)
- Notes et pensées (1888)
- Souvenirs du dernier secrétaire de Sainte-Beuve (1890)
- Essais critiques (1902)
- Sainte-Beuve intime et familier (1903)
- Souvenirs sur Champfleury et le rélisme (1905)

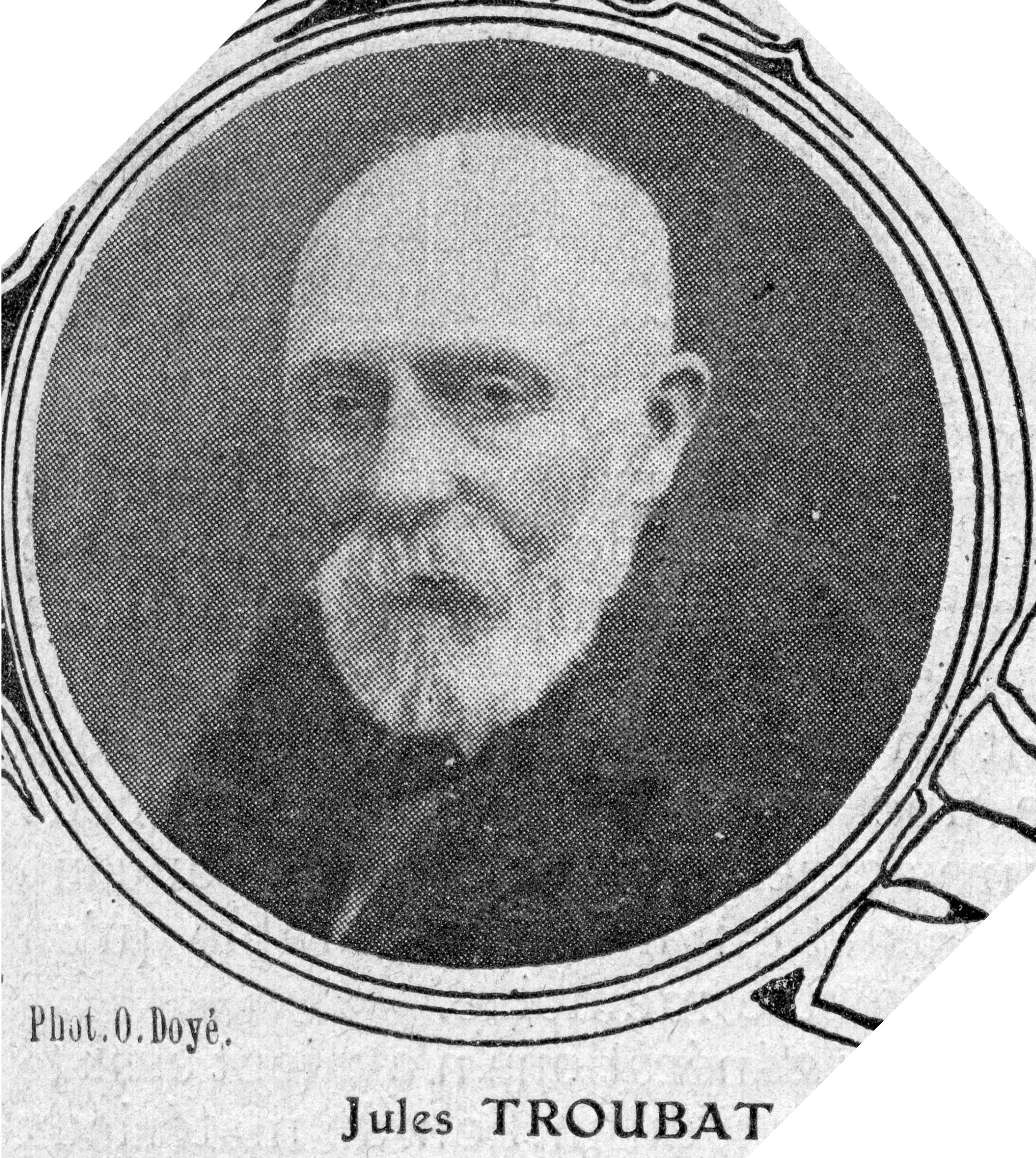
The portrait of Jules Troubat (1836-1914)
