= The Eternal Feminine (Cézanne) =

Painting by Paul Cézanne

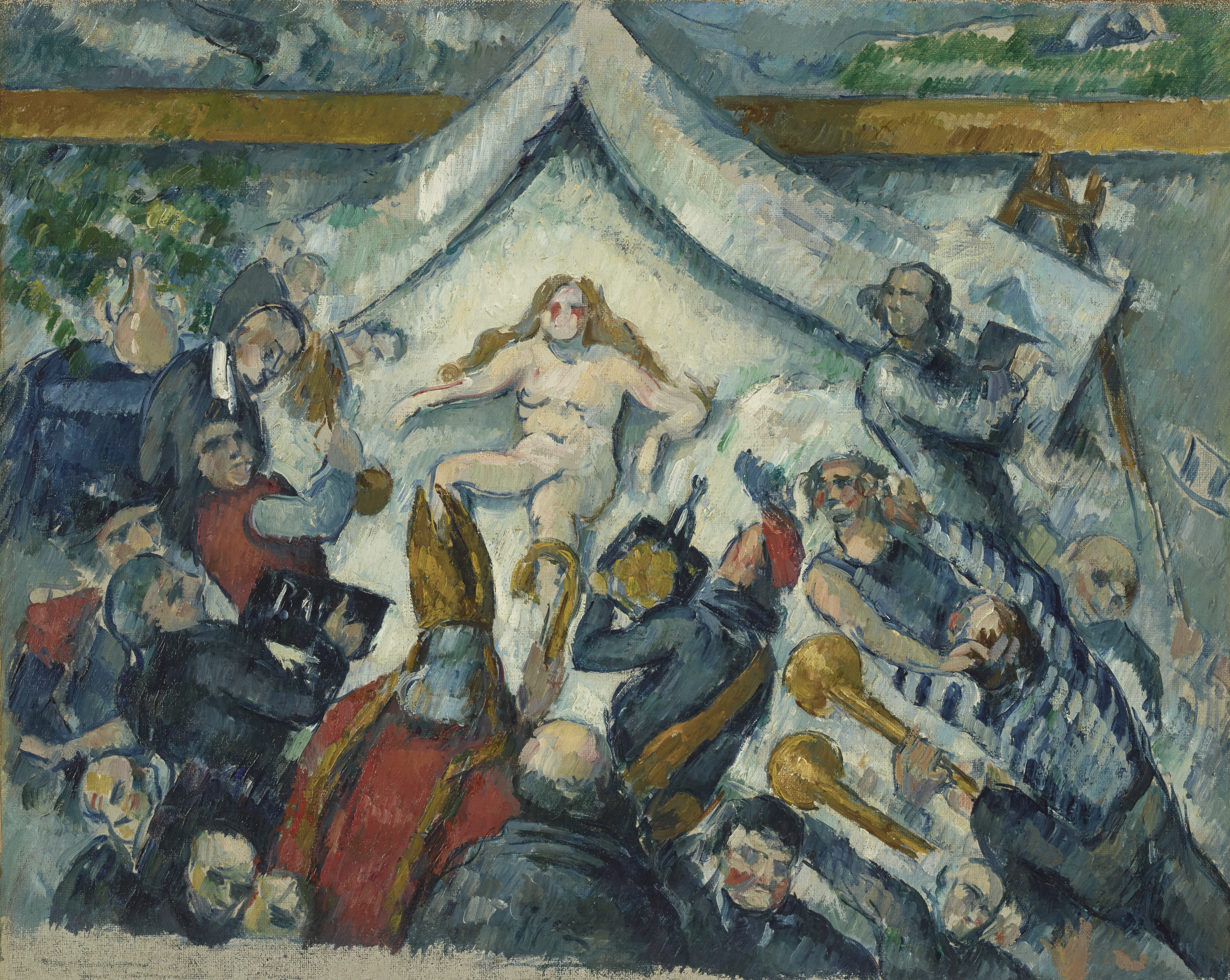
- Artist: Paul Cézanne
- Year: 1877
- Medium: Oil on canvas
- Dimensions: 44 cm × 53 cm (17.5 in × 20.7 in)
- Location: J. Paul Getty Museum, Los Angeles

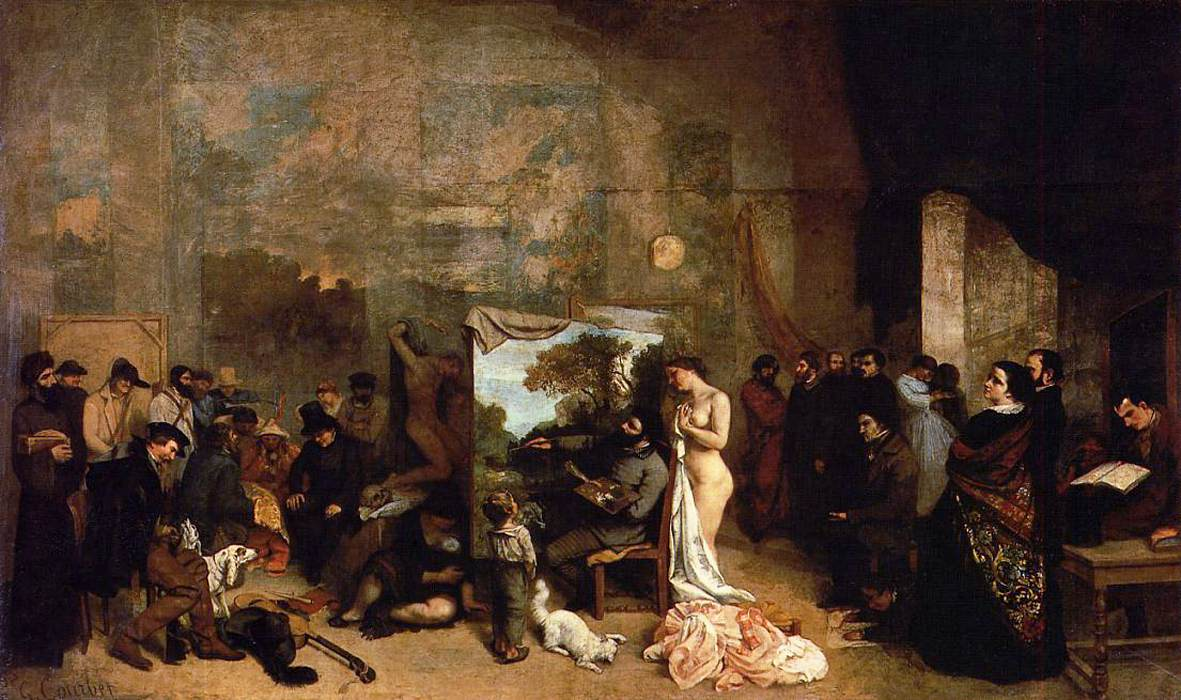
The Painter's Studio by Gustave Courbet, 1855

The Eternal Feminine is an 1877 oil-on-canvas painting by the French Post-Impressionist artist Paul Cézanne. The ambiguous work shows men gathered around a single female figure. A range of professions are represented: writers, lawyers, and a painter (possibly Eugène Delacroix or Cézanne himself).

The painting may have been inspired by both Christian and Pagan art representing deified women.

The painting has been compared to works done by Eugène Delacroix, Gustave Courbet, and other 19th-century artists. It also was a turning point in Cézanne's techniques.

== Analysis ==
Scholars regard the composition as distinctive. The canopy and the drapes placed above the woman's head is in the shape of a triangle. This creates a halo effect around the woman. This full body halo, also known as a mandorla, is in a diamond shape. The placement of the clouds allows light to spill onto the woman.

=== Female figure ===
A naked, golden-haired woman lies on a bed at the center of the painting. She has attracted an excited crowd, for whom her body is a spectacle. She has a blank face and appears blinded with her eyeballs clotted, and her open pose suggests vulnerability.

Scholars have sometimes seen the painting as a commentary on the political and symbolic role of women. The woman has been compared to the Virgin Mary, a saint, or Venus, evoking other depictions of deified women on an elevated surface. Cézanne may also have drawn on populist ideas about the role of women, referring to the depiction of women in popular prints.

The female figure has also been described as an extension of Cézanne's recurring interest in nudity and facelessness.

The suggestion of a halo through the canopy over the woman's head has sometimes been seen as an allusion to Saint Anthony's temptress. Alternatively, the woman has been seen as an allusion to Liberty in Delacroix's Liberty Leading the People (1830).

=== Relation to Courbet ===
Art historians have compared the work to Gustave Courbet's The Painter's Studio (1855). In Courbet's work, an artist is depicted painting a landscape before a group. A woman, thought to be the artist's mistress, stands behind him, but he does not look at her. In The Eternal Feminine, by contrast, Cézanne places the woman in the center of the canvas, and she displays her body with no shame, unlike the woman in Courbet's painting, who holds a drape to partially cover her body.

Cézanne's painting nonetheless resembles Courbet's composition in dividing the figures into a left and right group. The men on the right represent the art world, with the figures consisting of a painter, a conductor and entertainers. The men on the left represent a social world, with the figures including a financier, soldier, bishop, and banker. A man in the foreground of the painting seems representative of Cézanne himself, with his hat floating off into the air.

=== Relation to Delacroix ===
Art historians have observed that Cézanne struggled to live up to Delacroix's reputation, and his adoration for his predecessor became almost humiliating. Curators Christopher Riopelle and Françoise Cachin have proposed that The Eternal Feminine may be an attempt to reinterpret Delacroix's The Death of Sardanapalus (1827).

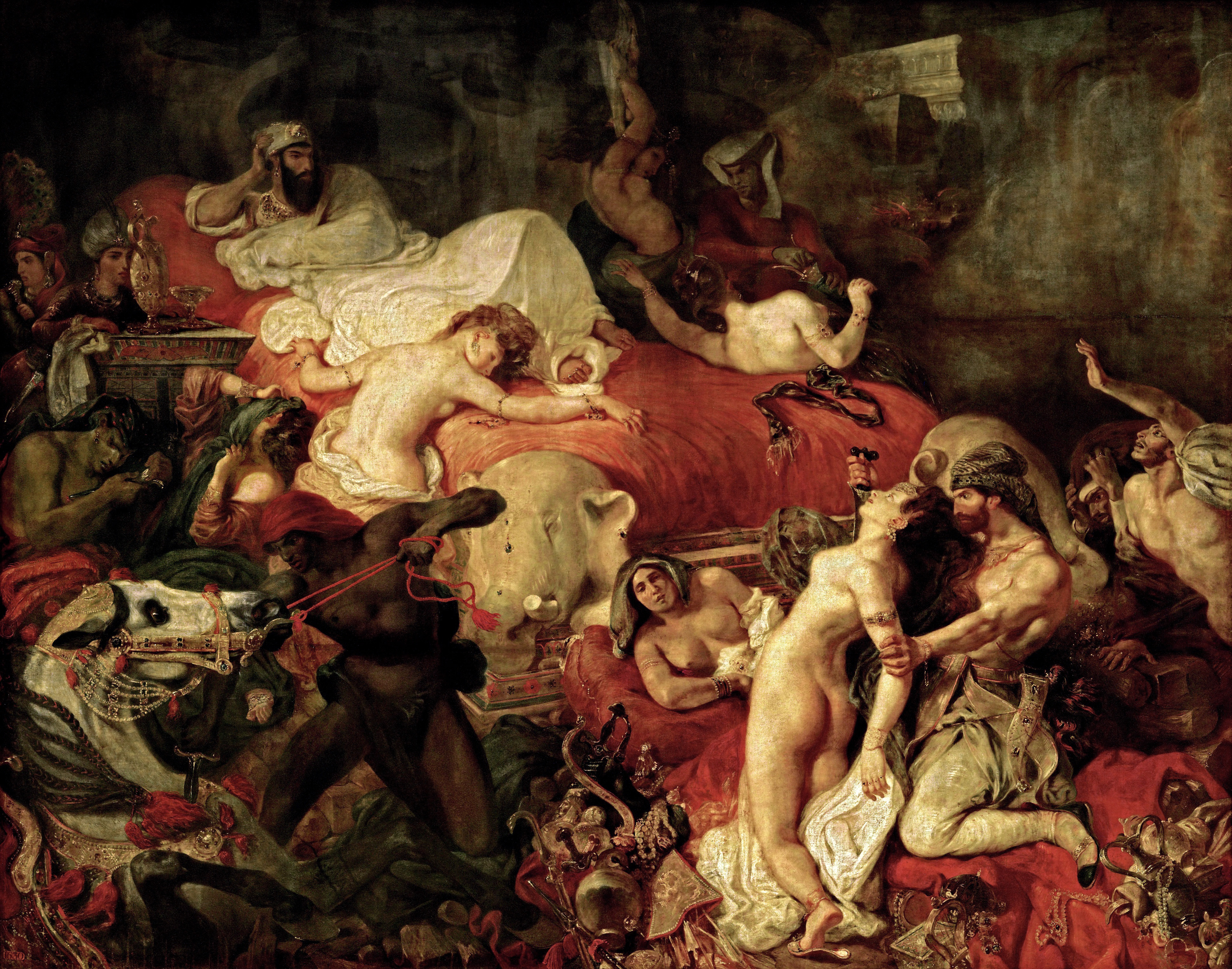
The Death of Sardanapalus done by Delacroix in 1827–28

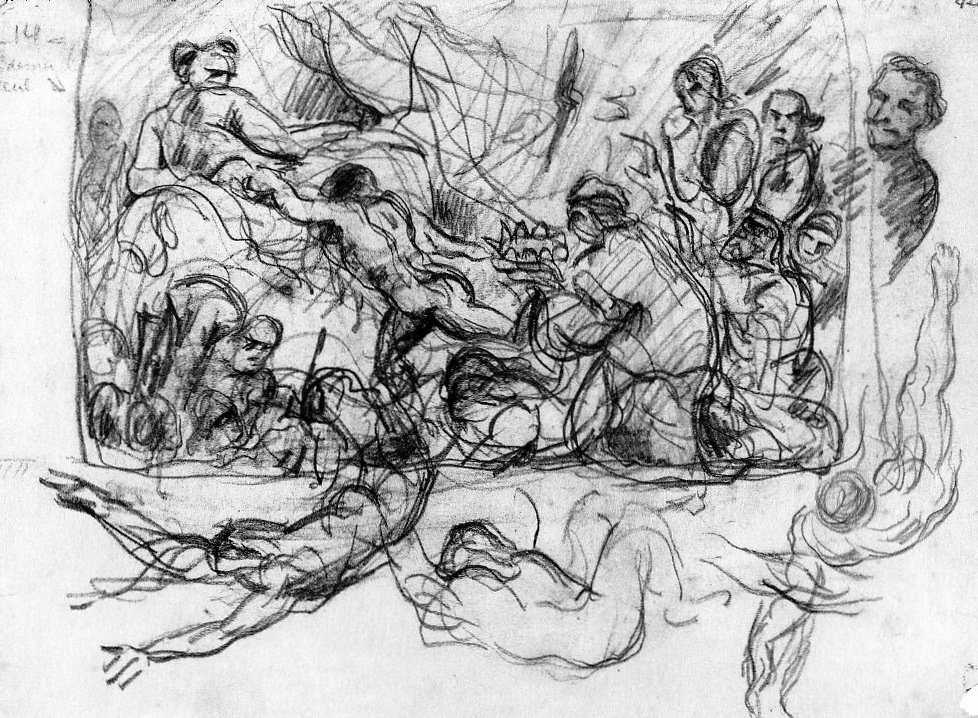
Preparatory Drawing for the Eternal Feminine, 1870-75

Delacroix's painting shows Sardanapalus in his palace reclining on his bed after ordering his family and animals to be killed. The preparatory drawing for The Eternal Feminine shows that Cézanne initially arranged the composition in the same structure as Delacroix's painting. Significantly, however, Cézanne's painting inverts the gender roles of Sardanapalus. The female figure replaces Sardanapalus, while male figures take the place occupied by the victims. In the final version of the Eternal Feminine, the woman can be seen as a kind of ruler, controlling her subjects' attention.

== Cézanne's depiction of women ==
Throughout Cézanne's career, he returned to the subject of the female body. In some works, the woman is represented as the femme fatale. In works such as The Eternal Feminine and Modern Olympia, the woman can be seen as a temptress, drawing men away from their artistic and intellectual careers.

Changes in Cézanne's personal life led to increased anxiety towards women. When he first used the femme fatale in his paintings in 1870, he also began sexual relations with a young, tall model known as Hortense Fiquet. This was probably one of his earliest sexual experiences, whose psychological effects he may have worked through in his paintings. According to one interpretation, Cézanne shows himself in The Eternal Feminine gazing upon the woman but overcoming the temptation of her physical beauty.

As he aged, Cézanne focused less on the femme fatale.

== New techniques ==
The painting has sometimes been described as the end of the Romantic and Baroque techniques of Cézanne's early career. The structure and rhythm of the painting are shaped via parallel brush strokes that converge towards the central nude figure, unifying the painting and imposing order. The Eternal Feminine was one of the first paintings in which Cézanne used these consecutive strokes, which became prevalent in his work in the following years. The technique inspired younger artists like Paul Signac and Gauguin.

== Provenance ==
The painting was first purchased by Ambroise Vollard when it was shown in the Cézanne Exhibition in November 1899. The painting has been in the permanent collection of the J. Paul Getty Museum in Los Angeles since 1987.

== See also ==
- List of paintings by Paul Cézanne
