= Adolphe Hervier =

French painter and printmaker (1818–1879)

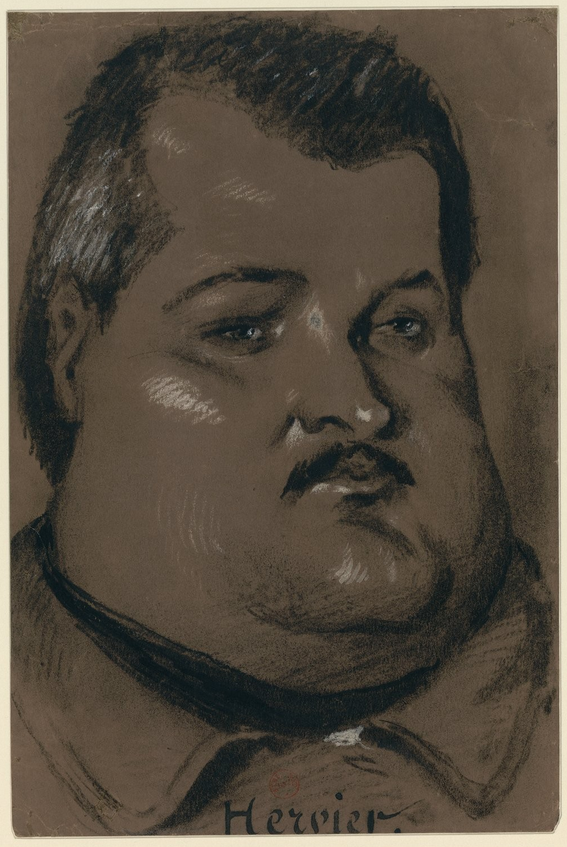
Adolph Hervier; caricature by Nadar (1850)

Adolphe Hervier, in full: Louis-Henri-Victor-Jules-François-Adolphe Hervier (1818, Paris - 18 January 1879, Paris) was a French painter and engraver, known for his rural genre scenes. Over his lifetime, his style changed from a strict Romanticism to an early type of Impressionism.

== Biography ==
His father was Marie-Antoine Hervier (1783-after 1830), a painter of portrait miniatures who had studied with Jacques-Louis David and gave young Adolphe his first lessons. This was followed by studies with Charles Dusaulchoy (1781–1852), who was known for his many portraits of Napoleon. He also frequented the workshop of Léon Cogniet, who was an acquaintance of his father's.

He began to produce his own works by the late 1830s. However, he wasn't able to exhibit at the Salon for the first time until 1849, having been rejected since at least 1840. Despite continued rejection, he would exhibit there on five later occasions, three times in the 1850s and, finally, in 1870. Following an unsuccessful sale in 1856, organized by Hervier himself at the Hôtel Drouot, his work began to attract the attention of art critics, such as Champfleury and Philippe Burty, who was especially appreciative.

In addition to his numerous oil and watercolor paintings, he produced engravings by etching, aquatint and lithography. Despite being Parisian, his favorite painting locations were in Normandy; including Honfleur, Le Havre, Rouen and Granville. Camille Corot helped promote his work, but he made little money and was employed painting landscape backgrounds for more prestigious artists; notably Charles Édouard Armand-Dumaresq.

He never married and, upon his death, his estate went to his mother and brother. Albums of his engravings were published in 1888 and 1896, but he was largely forgotten until January 1909, when an influential art magazine, The Studio, devoted an entire issue to him.

His paintings may be seen at the Musée des beaux-arts de Dijon and the Musée Lambinet. The Louvre has a collection of his prints and drawings.

== Selected works ==
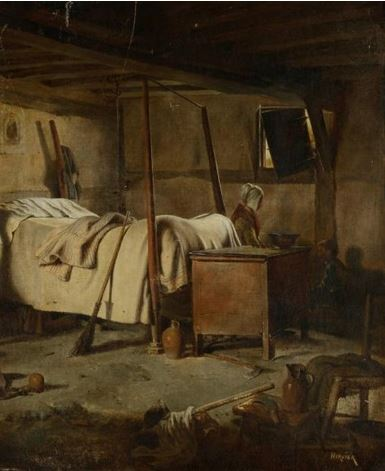
Peasant Interior

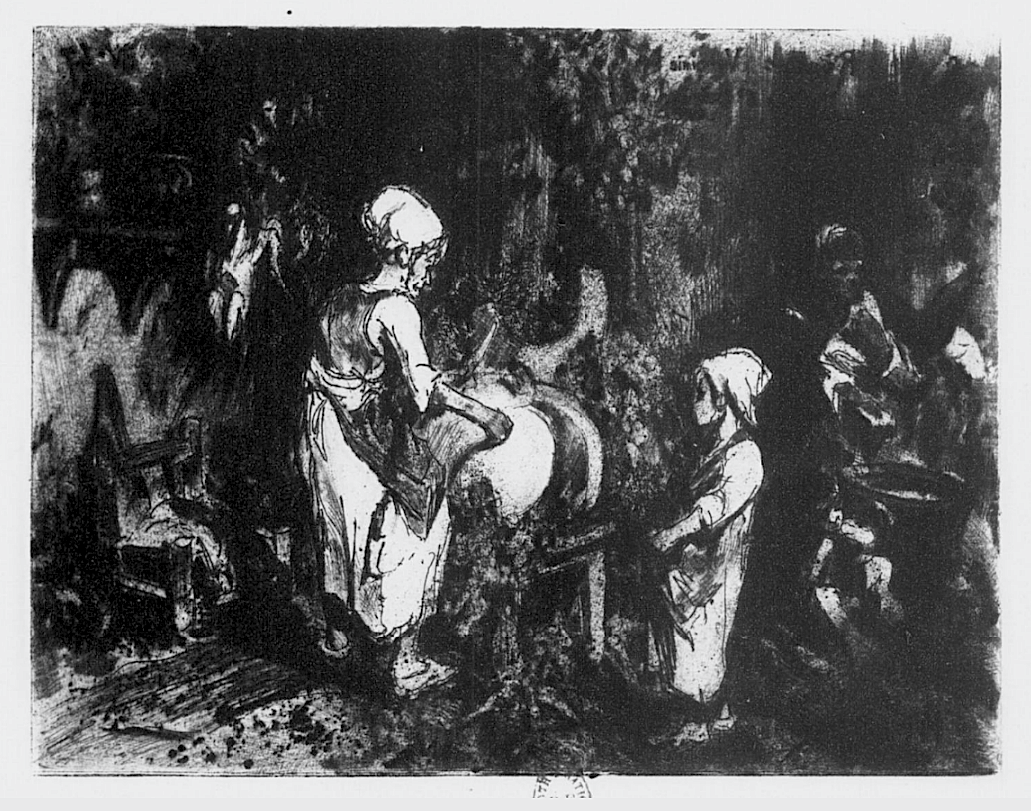
The Pumpkin

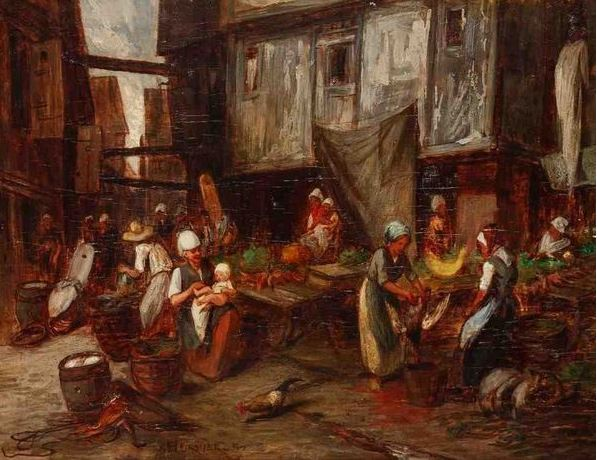
Village Scene

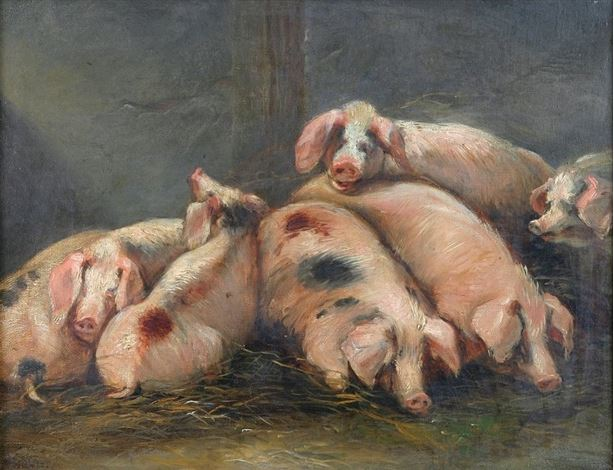
The Piggery

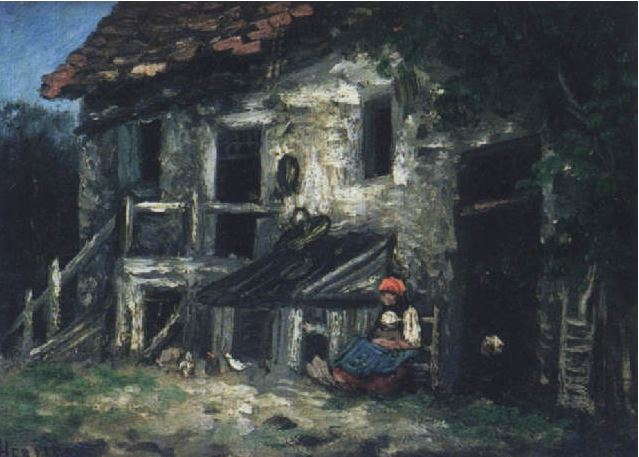
Farmyard
