= The Wrestlers (Courbet) =

Painting by Gustave Courbet

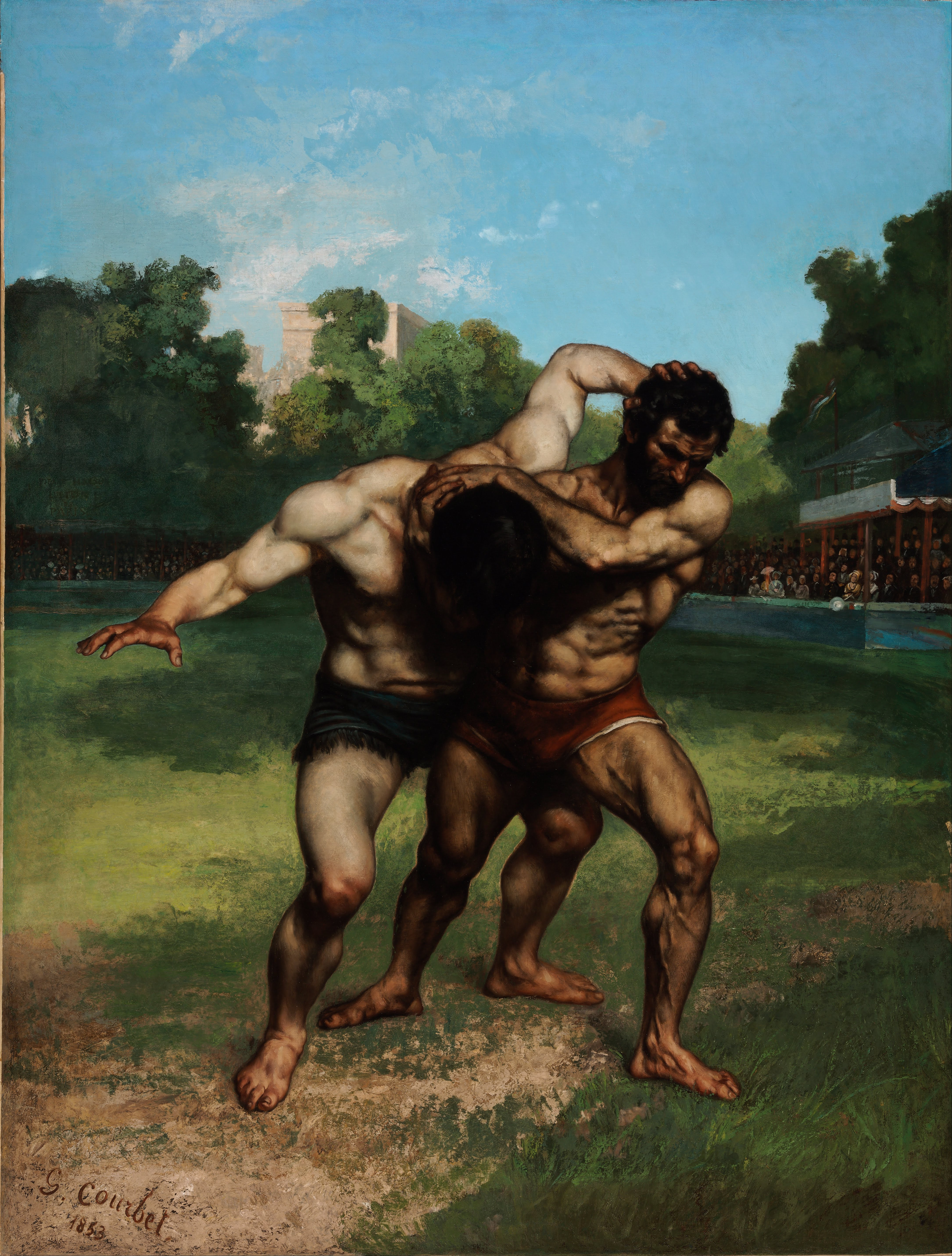
- Artist: Gustave Courbet
- Year: 1853
- Medium: oil on canvas
- Dimensions: 252 cm × 198 cm (99 in × 78 in)
- Location: Museum of Fine Arts, Budapest

The Wrestlers is a large 1853 painting by the French artist Gustave Courbet, now in the Museum of Fine Arts in Budapest. It shows two men engaged in 'French wrestling', inspired by Greco-Roman wrestling. Documents reveal that it shows a match in the former hippodrome on the Champs-Élysées in Paris. His choice of such a huge canvas inspired (among others) Alexandre Falguière's 1875 The Wrestlers.

It was first exhibited at the Paris Salon of 1853 as the pendant to The Bathers. In a letter to his parents dated 13 May 1853, Courbet said of The Wrestlers that "I have covered their nudity and [the critics] have not yet said anything good or bad about it". By contrast, The Bathers divided the public and probably distracted attention from The Wrestlers. He also revealed that he had re-used a frame from his 1841 painting St Walpurgis' Night, inspired by the legend of Faust and exhibited at the 1848 Salon (financial troubles had caused him to re-use that canvas).

In 1867 Wrestlers entered baron Léon Hirsch's collection at Chenonceaux. It was bought in 1908 by Ferenc Hatvany (1881–1958), a rich Hungarian, who had also acquired L'Origine du monde in 1913. It entered the Museum of Fine Arts in May 1952 and it was restored there in 2010. It was exhibited for the first time in France in sixty years in 2012 at the Musée d'Orsay.
