= Julien Vallou de Villeneuve =

French artist (1795–1866)

- Born: 12 December 1795; Boissy-Saint-Léger
- Died: 4 May 1866 (aged 70); Paris

Julien Vallou de Villeneuve (12 December 1795 – 4 May 1866) was a French painter, lithographer and photographer.

== Life and work ==
Vallou de Villeneuve studied with Jean-François Millet, and started his career at the Salon of 1814, exhibiting images depicting daily life, fashion, regional costumes and nude studies. In 1826 he showed at the Salon 'Costumes des Provinces Septentrionales des Pays-Bas'. He published in 1829 lithographs of Types des Femmes. In 1830 with Achille Devera and Numas, Maurin and Tessaert, he contributed to the compendium of erotica Imagerie Galante (Paris 1830). He developed an international following for his 1839 folio-sized lithographic erotic series Les Jeunes Femmes, Groupes de Tetes, depicting racy episodes in the life of young women and their lovers.

From 1842 de Villeneuve took up photography, not long after its invention, as an adjunct and aid to his graphic work, producing some daguerreotypes but predominantly softly toned salted paper prints from paper negatives that enabled the retouching he employed for artistic effect. Following the method of Humbert de Molard, he fixed his prints with ammonia which avoided the bleaching of highlights caused in salt prints by hypo, and thus incidentally ensured the archival permanence of his prints, which survive today. He had many of his prints made by photolithographer Rose-Joseph Lemercier (1803–1887). In 1850 de Villeneuve opened a photographic studio at 18 Rue Bleue, Paris, where his subjects were 'academic studies', small prints of nudes as models for artists. He printed a series of these studies as 'Etudes d’apres nature', and many were published in La Lumiere, journal of the Society Francaise de la Photographie. There was also a ready market for his photographs of well-known actors in full costume posing against theatrical scenery.

In 1851 he joined the world's first, but short-lived (1851–1853), photographic organisation, the Société héliographique From 1853 to 1854 he was a founding member of the Société française de photographie (S.F.P.) that replaced it.

== Vallou de Villeneuve and Courbet ==
Realist painter Gustave Courbet was introduced to Vallou de Villeneuve's photographs by fellow artist Alfred Bruyas during the 1850s and used them as source material for his paintings, in particular L'Atelier (1855) and Les Baigneuses (1853). In 1954, the 27th Venice Biennale presented a large-scale retrospective devoted to Gustave Courbet; one of the first major exhibitions devoted to the painter. Germain Bazin and Helene Adhémar (conservator, Department of Paintings at the Louvre) were the commissioners of ”A new century of vision" which gave an essential place for artistic creations of the Second Empire. Jean Adhémar, curator, stressed that "first photographers are almost all painters, especially under Napoleon III". The section on “The times of Courbet, Manet, Nadar" was one of the richest in both the number of works presented - forty - and in the range of their subjects: it articulated the parallel between the realistic vision of the painter and the photographer. This was thus the first to attempt to identify the model in the nude photography requested by Courbet of Bruyas and mentioned for the first time by Pierre Borel in 1922. A nude by Jacques Moulin (also exhibited) had previously been connected with the model in The Artist's Studio (L'Atelier du peintre): A Real Allegory of a Seven Year Phase in my Artistic and Moral Life (1855), by evoking the similarity of the models. But two photographs by Vallou Villeneuve, exhibited in the same section, where the model, Henriette Bonnion poses in an attitude similar to that in Courbet's 'Bathers' (1853) and 'Artist's Studio' showed it likely (as subsequent studies have confirmed), that the Vallou model and not Moulin's was used by Courbet.

== Later life ==
In 1855, Vallou de Villeneuve donated his prints to the Société française de photographie (S.F.P.). No photographs by him after this date are recorded and he died in Paris eleven years later.

Vallou de Villeneuve is buried at Père Lachaise Cemetery (31st division, 1st ligne, U 33).

== Gallery ==
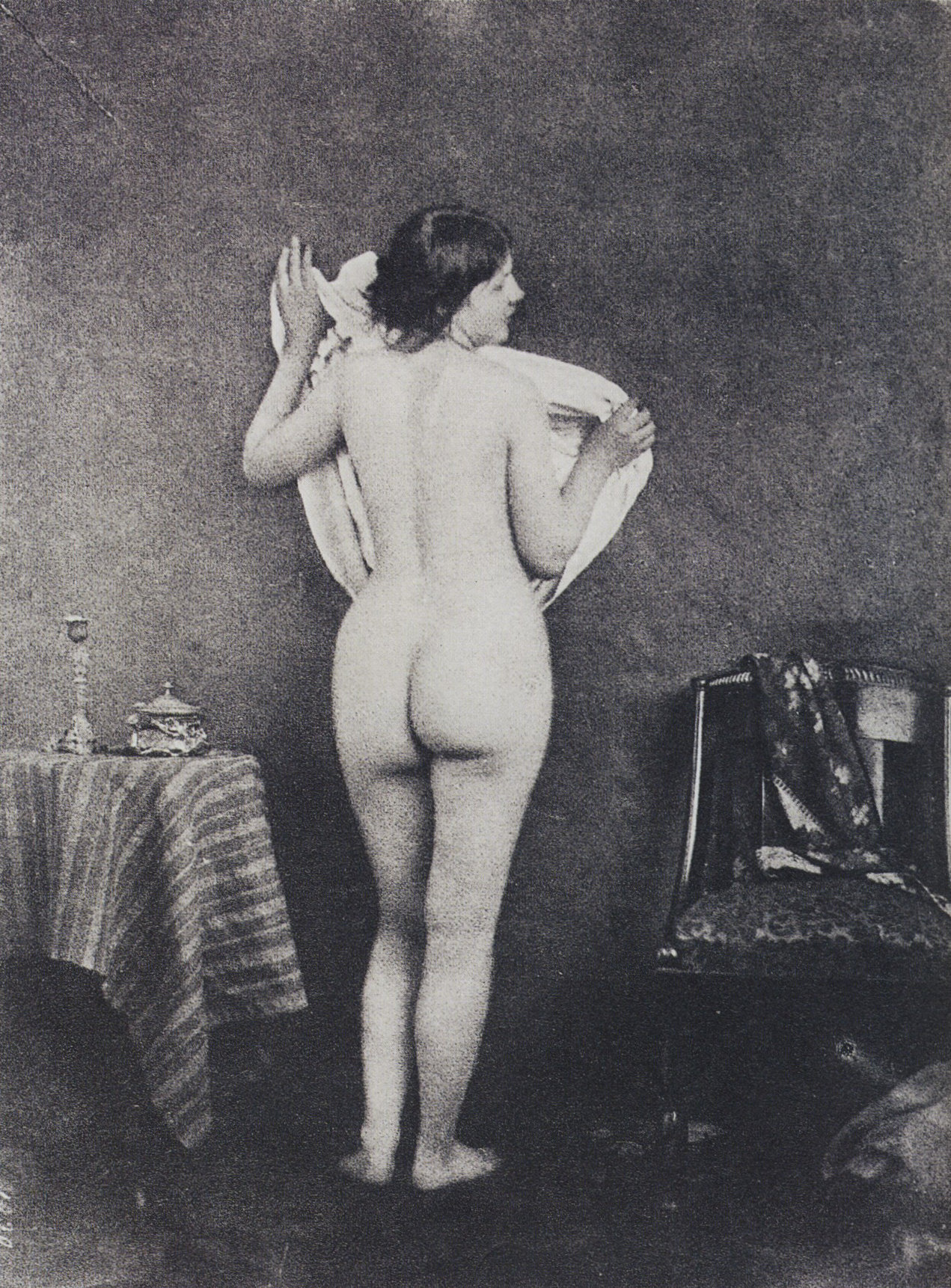

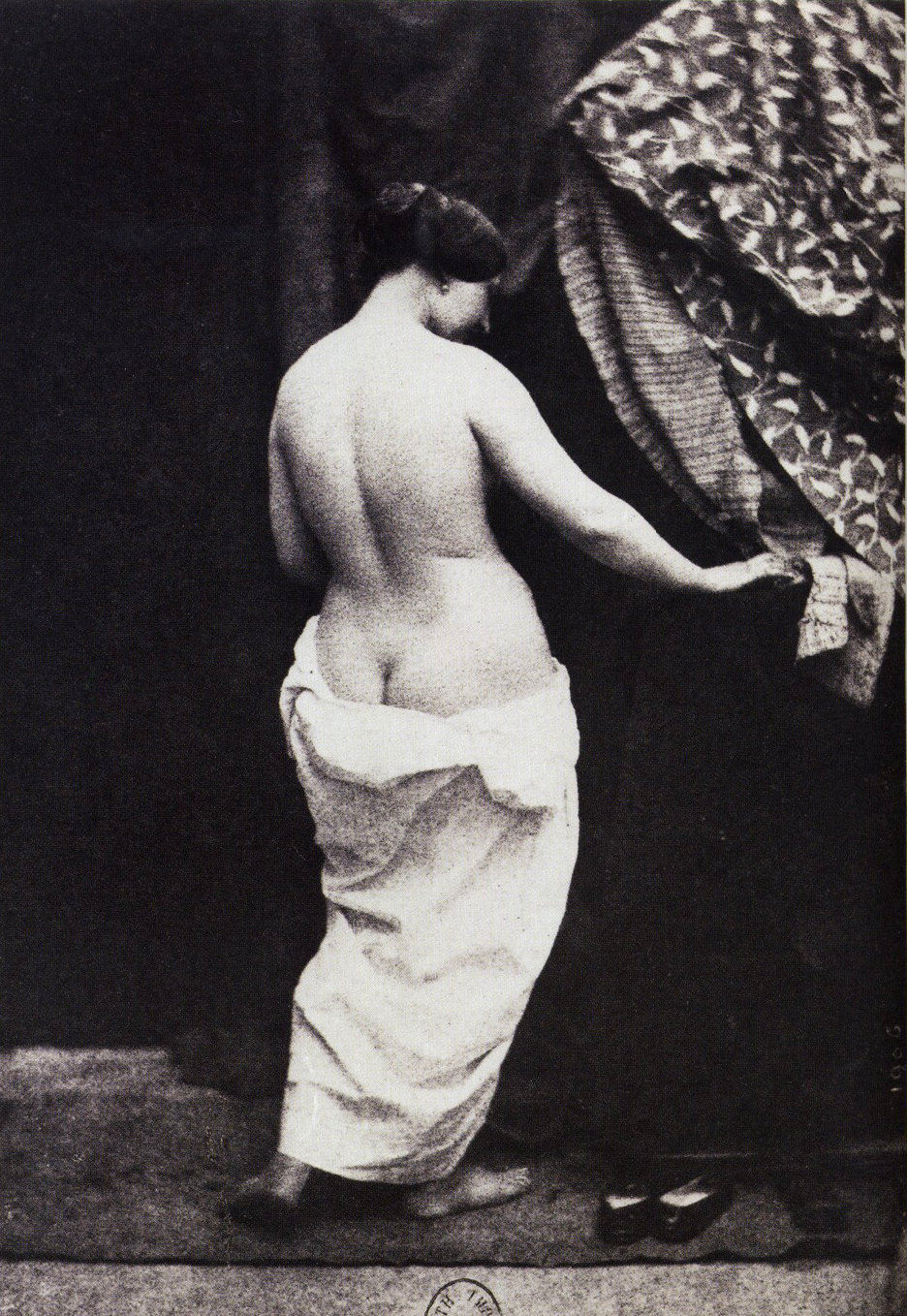

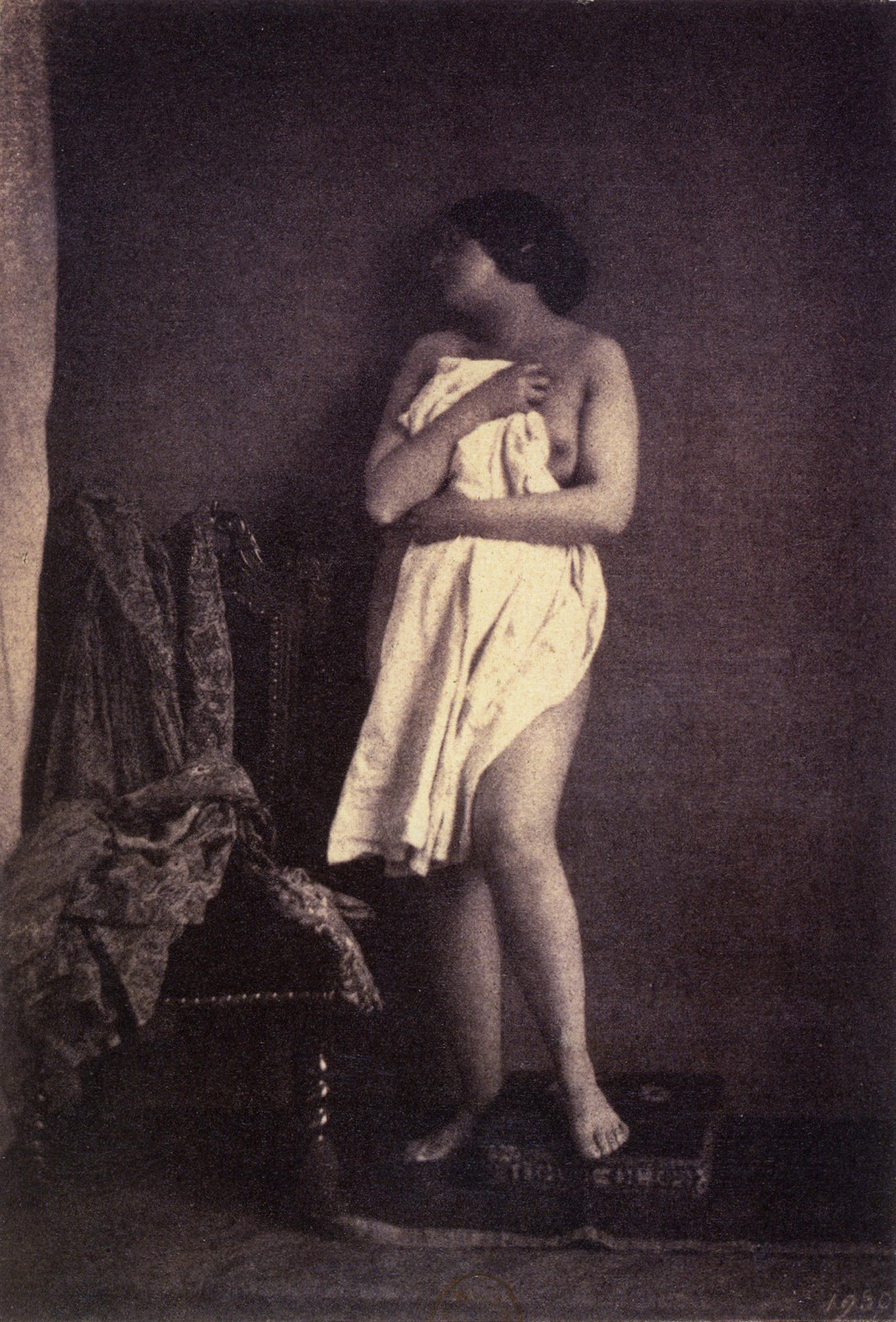

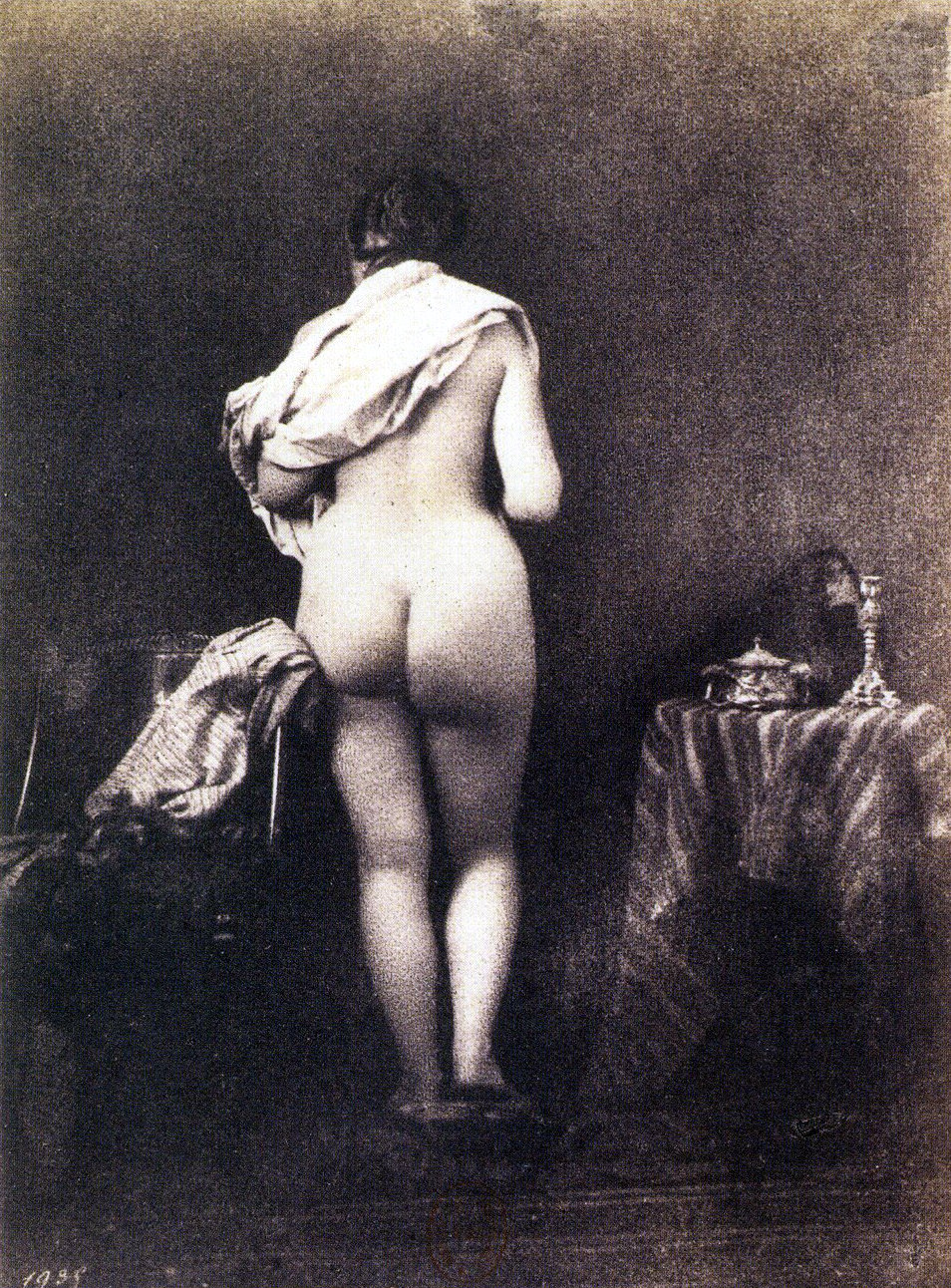

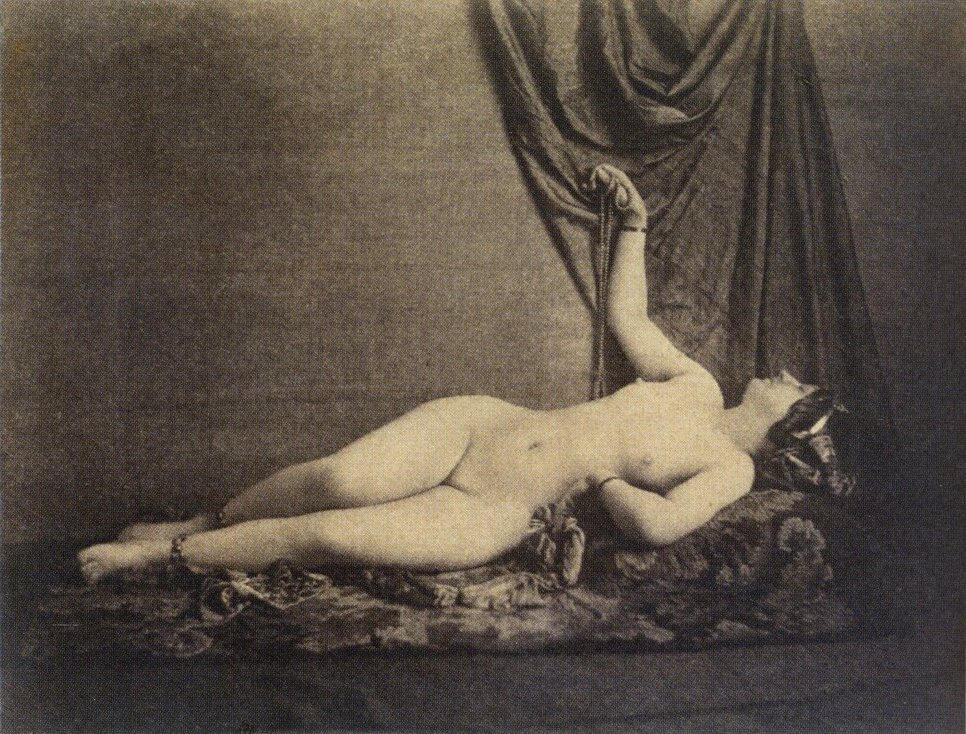

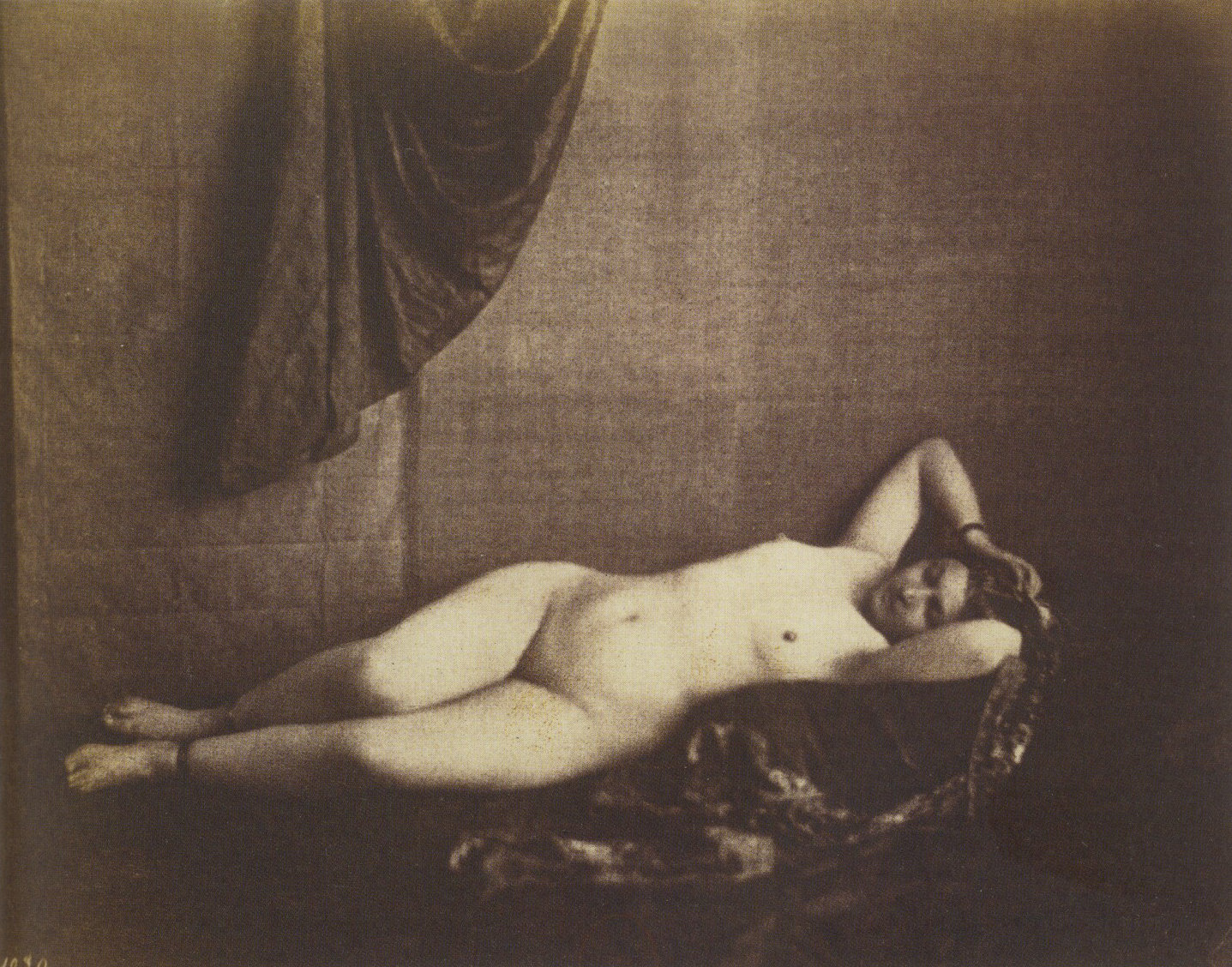
