= The Bacchante (Courbet) =

French painting by Gustave Courbet

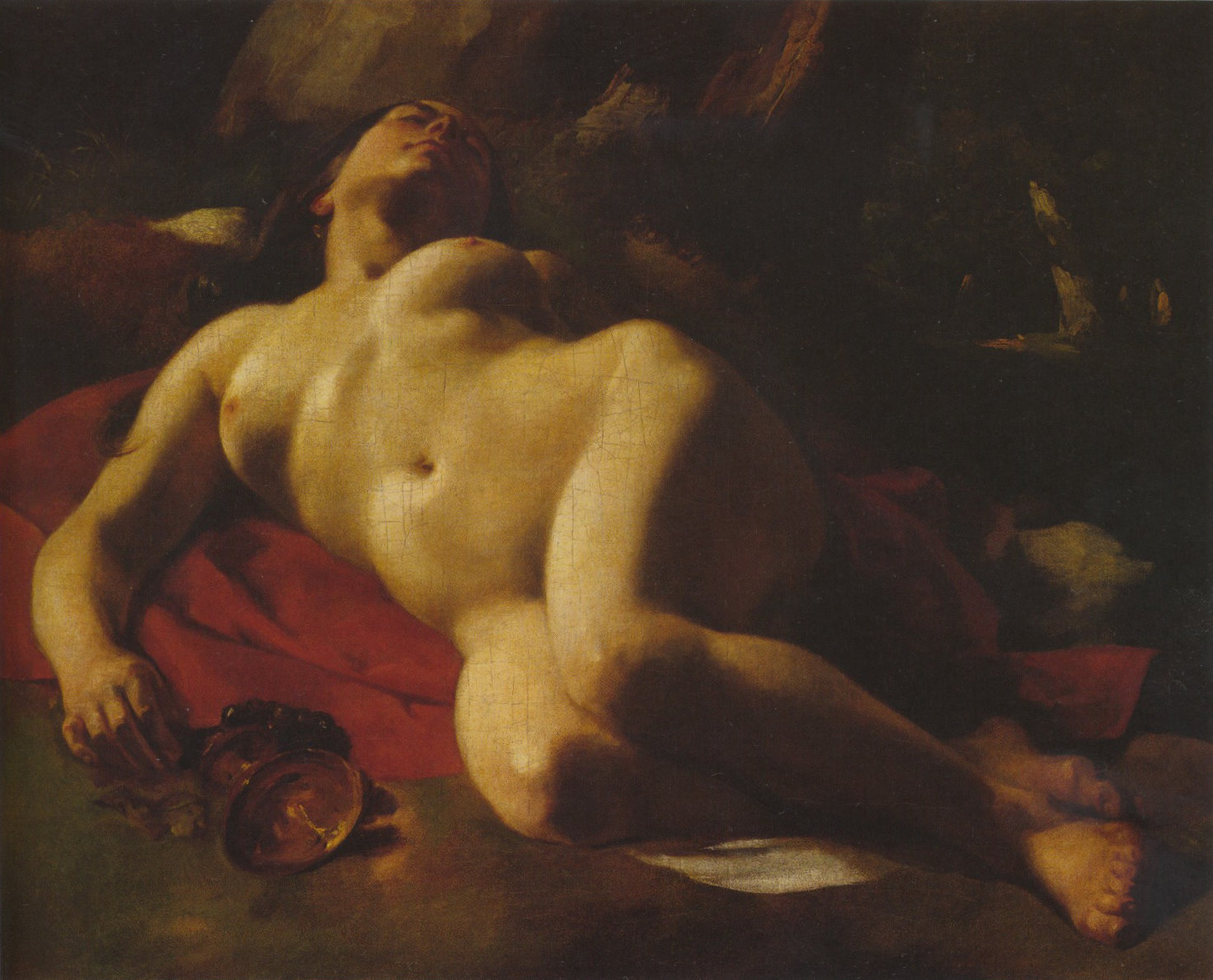
- Artist: Gustave Courbet
- Year: Undated (between 1844 and 1847)
- Medium: oil on canvas
- Dimensions: 65 cm × 81 cm (26 in × 32 in)
- Location: Fondation Rau, Cologne

The Bacchante is an oil-on-canvas painting by the French artist Gustave Courbet, produced between 1844 and 1847. The painting's title relates the work to images of Bacchantes from Greco-Roman mythology and to Renaissance paintings and sculptures on that subject.

It is one of Courbet's earliest surviving works, painted when he was still under the influence of nudes by the old masters such as Correggio and his Venus, Satyr and Cupid. Another female nude by Courbet from around the same time is Female nude sleeping by a stream (Detroit Institute of Arts).

== Provenance ==
In 1914 it was sold by the art dealers Frederik Muller & Cie of Amsterdam. Until 1968 it was in the Van Nierop collection, before passing to the Lefevre Gallery in London, from which it was acquired by doctor Gustav Rau for the foundation he was founding in Cologne. In 2011 the musée Courbet displayed an exhibition showing the links between the sculptor Auguste Clésinger and Courbet, who were close friends. These links were especially seen between Clésinger's 1847 marble work Woman Bitten by a Serpent and Courbet's The Bacchante.

== Bibliography (in French) ==
- des Cars, Laurence; de Font-Réauls, Dominique; Tinterow, Gary; Hilaire, Michel (2007). Gustave Courbet : Exposition Paris, New York, Montpellier 2007-2008 (Exhibition catalogue). Réunion des musées nationaux. ISBN 978-2-7118-5297-0.
- Bruno Foucart, Courbet, Paris, Flammarion, coll. « Les maitres de la peinture moderne », 1977 (OCLC 602545091, notice BnF no FRBNF34592962).
- James H. Rubin (translated by Xavier Bernard), Courbet, Phaidon, coll. « Art & Idées », 2003 (ISBN 0-7148-9078-2).
