= Alfred Bruyas =

French art collector (1821–1877)

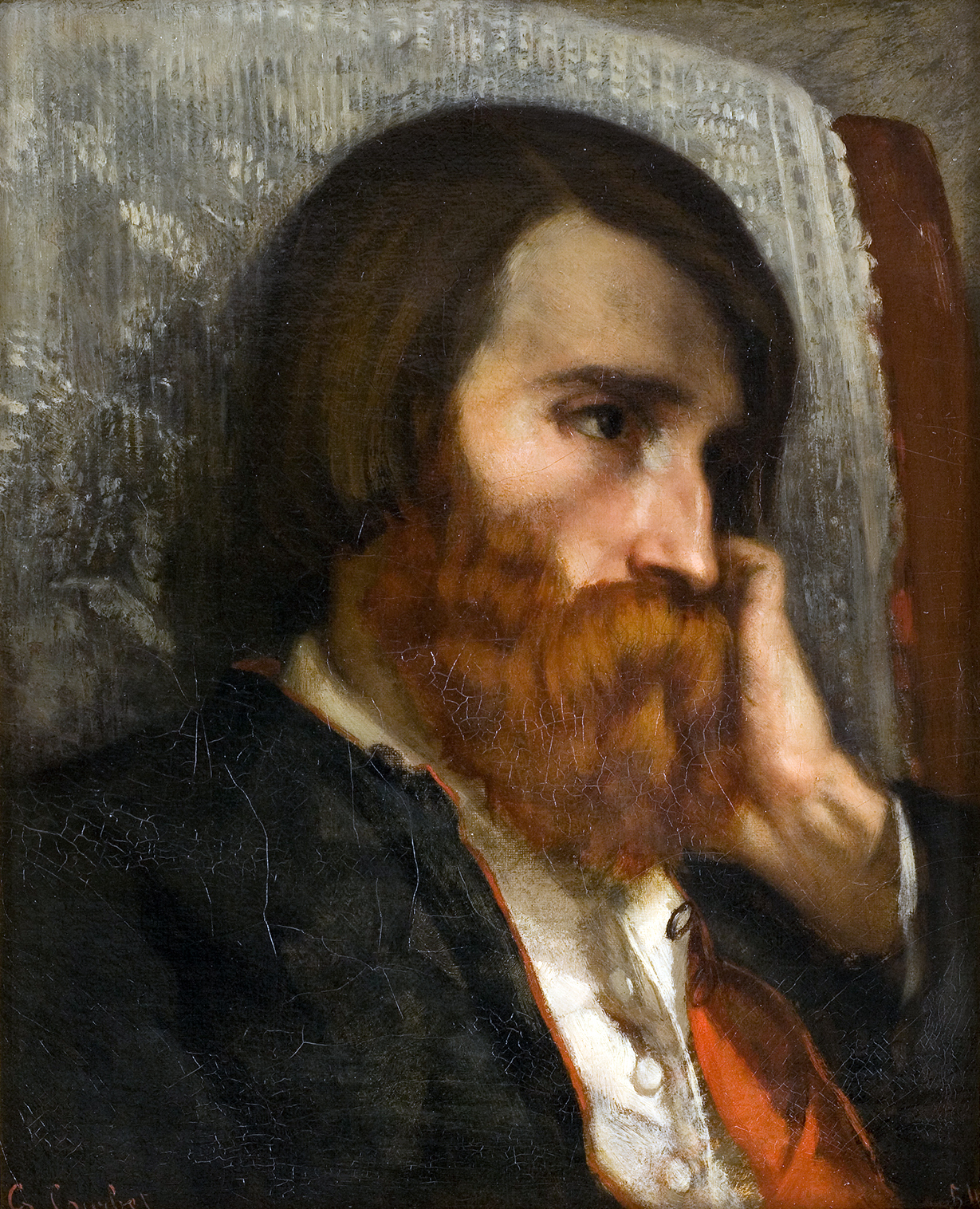
- Portrait of Alfred Bruyas, Gustave Courbet, 1854
- Born: Jacques Louis Bruyas; 15 August 1821; Montpellier, France
- Died: 1 January 1877 (aged 55); Montpellier, France

Jacques Louis Bruyas (15 August 1821 – 1 January 1877), known as Alfred Bruyas (French pronunciation: [alfʁɛd bʁɥijas]), was a French art collector and a personal friend of many important artists of his time, among them Gustave Courbet and Alexandre Cabanel. He donated his collection to the Musée Fabre, in Montpellier.

== Biography ==
Born Jacques Louis Bruyas, he was the son of a wealthy banker in Montpellier. His interest in art was clear even at school. In 1840 he studied at the studio of Charles Matet, however he soon recognized the limits of his own talents and shifted his focus to the promotion and collection of contemporary art.

From 1849 to 1854 he spent most of his time in Paris. There he collected work by Louis Hector Allemand, Camille Corot, Thomas Couture, Eugène Delacroix, Narcisse Diaz de Peña, Adrien Guignet, Adolphe Hervier, Prosper Marilhat, Édouard-Antoine Marsal, Jean-François Millet, Théodore Rousseau, Philippe Joseph Tassaert, Marcel Verdier and Constant Troyon, but above all the work of Gustave Courbet.
