= Gustav Rau (art collector) =

German medical doctor, philanthropist and art collector

Gustav Rau (21 January 1922 – 3 January 2002) was a German medical doctor, philanthropist and art collector. Rau who was born and died in Stuttgart.

== Life ==
Rau was born in Stuttgart in 1922 and was drafted into the Nazi Wehrmacht at 19. His father left him a large inheritance. Later, after selling the family business and completing his medical studies, he relocated to Africa.

He worked in Nigeria and the former Zaire, where he founded a hospital.

== Art collector ==
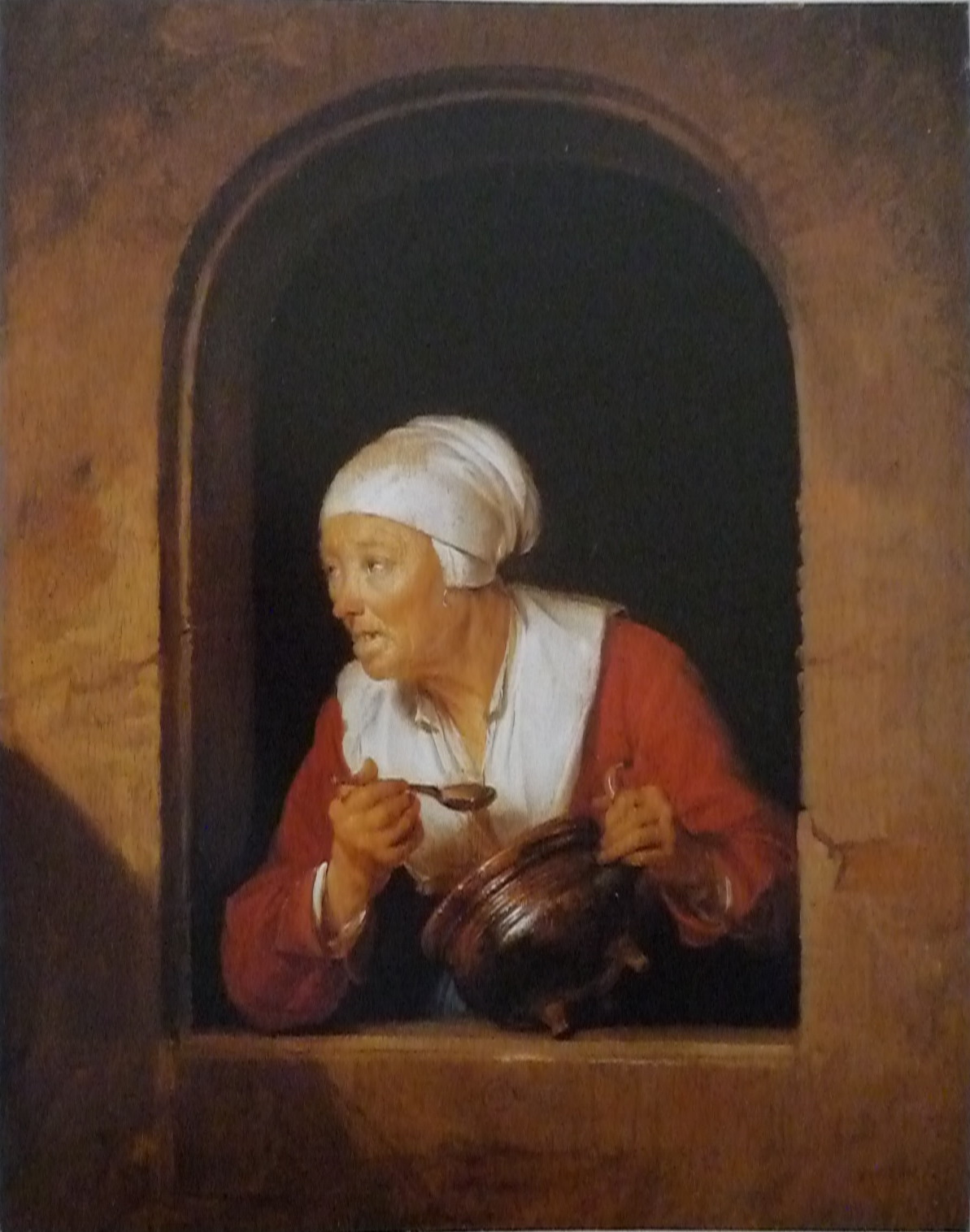
Gerrit Dou, The Cook.

According to The New York Times, he amassed one of the world's major private art collections, "second only in size to the Thyssen-Bronemisza collection in Madrid, his foundation said." In 1958 Rau bought his first old master, The Cook by Gerard Dou. He attended auctions in London, Paris and New York. By 1997 he had collected 700 paintings, sculptures and craft works. The collection contains outstanding paintings from the 14th century to modernism, including El Greco's Saint Dominic at Prayer, Auguste Renoir's Lady with a Rose, Camille Pissarro's Portrait of Jeanne and Paul Cézanne's La mer à l’estaque, a still-life flower painting by Odilon Redon, Canaletto's St Mark's Square, works by Cranach, The Beheading of Goliath by David (1606–07), an early Guido Reni, paintings by Giandomenico Tiepolo, François Boucher, Thomas Gainsborough, Jean-Baptiste-Camille Corot, Gustave Courbet, Edvard Munch, Édouard Manet, Claude Monet, Edgar Degas, Alfred Sisley, Camille Pissarro, Max Liebermann, early Italian panel paintings and other Renaissance, Mannerist and Baroque paintings.

The collection grew in an underground vault at Zürich Airport out of public view but under the watchful eye of the Swiss authorities. He made loans from the collection to international exhibitions, mostly credited as "from a Swiss private collection". However, the quality and scope of the collection remained mysterious until a major exhibition in Paris in 2001. The collection is valued between 500 and 750 million Euros (Approximately $555 and $832 million in US Dollars). Eight works from the collection were auctioned at Sotheby's in London in 2008 for a total of £6.2 million - a triptych by Taddeo di Bartolo valued at £300,000 sold for £1.9 million and one of Tintoretto's self-portraits for the then record price of £1.6 million. The Foundation raised 43 million Euros for Unicef by selling some works from the collection in 2013. Early in 2014 The Self-Assured Algerian by Jean-Baptiste Corot and View of the Hermitage by Pissarro were sold for a total of 16 million Euros, again to raise money for UNICEF, though the sale was criticised since these two works were from the core collection, which was supposed to be kept together until 2026.

== Nazi-looted art ==
In 2013 controversy arose when it was discovered that the art donated to Unicef included a painting by Paul Cézanne that had been looted by the Nazis from its former Jewish owners during the German occupation of France in World War II. In 2000 French courts ordered the seizure of Cézanne's “The sea at l’Estaque” which was part of the “From Fra Angelico to Bonnard: masterpieces from the Rau Collection” exhibition at the Musée du Luxembourg because of a claim that it had been looted by Nazis from the gallery owner Josse Bernheim-Jeune
