= Champfleury =

French author (1821–1889)

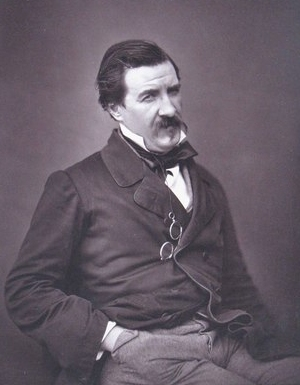
- Champfleury circa 1860, photographed by Nadar
- Born: Jules François Felix Fleury-Husson; 17 September 1821; Laon, Picardy, France
- Died: 6 December 1889 (aged 68); Sèvres, France
- Occupations: art critic, novelist

Jules François Felix Fleury-Husson (17 September 1821, in Laon, Aisne – 6 December 1889, in Sèvres), who wrote under the name Champfleury (French pronunciation: [ʃɑ̃fløʁi]), was a French art critic and novelist, a prominent supporter of the Realist movement in painting and fiction.

In 1843 Fleury-Husson moved to Paris. He met Charles Baudelaire and the next year started writing art criticism under the pen-name "Champfleury" for the journal L'Artiste. He was one of the first to promote the work of Gustave Courbet, in an article appearing in an issue of Le Pamphlet in 1848.

In 1856, during a time when the Spanish school was still largely ignored, he advocated the work of El Greco. He wrote about the Le Nain brothers and Maurice Quentin de La Tour. He also had a brief affair in 1851 with Eveline Hańska, the widow of his friend Honoré de Balzac.

He edited the periodical Le réalisme in 1856 and 1857.

His novels, of which the best-known is Les bourgeois de Molinchart (1854), were among the earliest Realist works.

In 1869 his book Les Chats, a series of essays about cats including portrayals of cats by prominent artists of the time, was published by Librairie de la Société Botanique de France, edited by J. Rothschild.

From 1872 until his death in 1889 he was Chief of Collections at the Sèvres porcelain factory.

The character of Marcel in Henri Murger's Scènes de la vie de bohème, and thus the corresponding character Marcello in Puccini's opera based on it, was partially based on Champfleury. Champfleury was a friend of Murger and they had roomed together for a time.

== Selected publications ==
- Troubat, Souvenirs sur Champfleury et le Réalisme (Paris, 1905)
- Champfleury, The Faience Violin (New York, 1895)
