= The Woman in the Waves =

Painting by Gustave Courbet

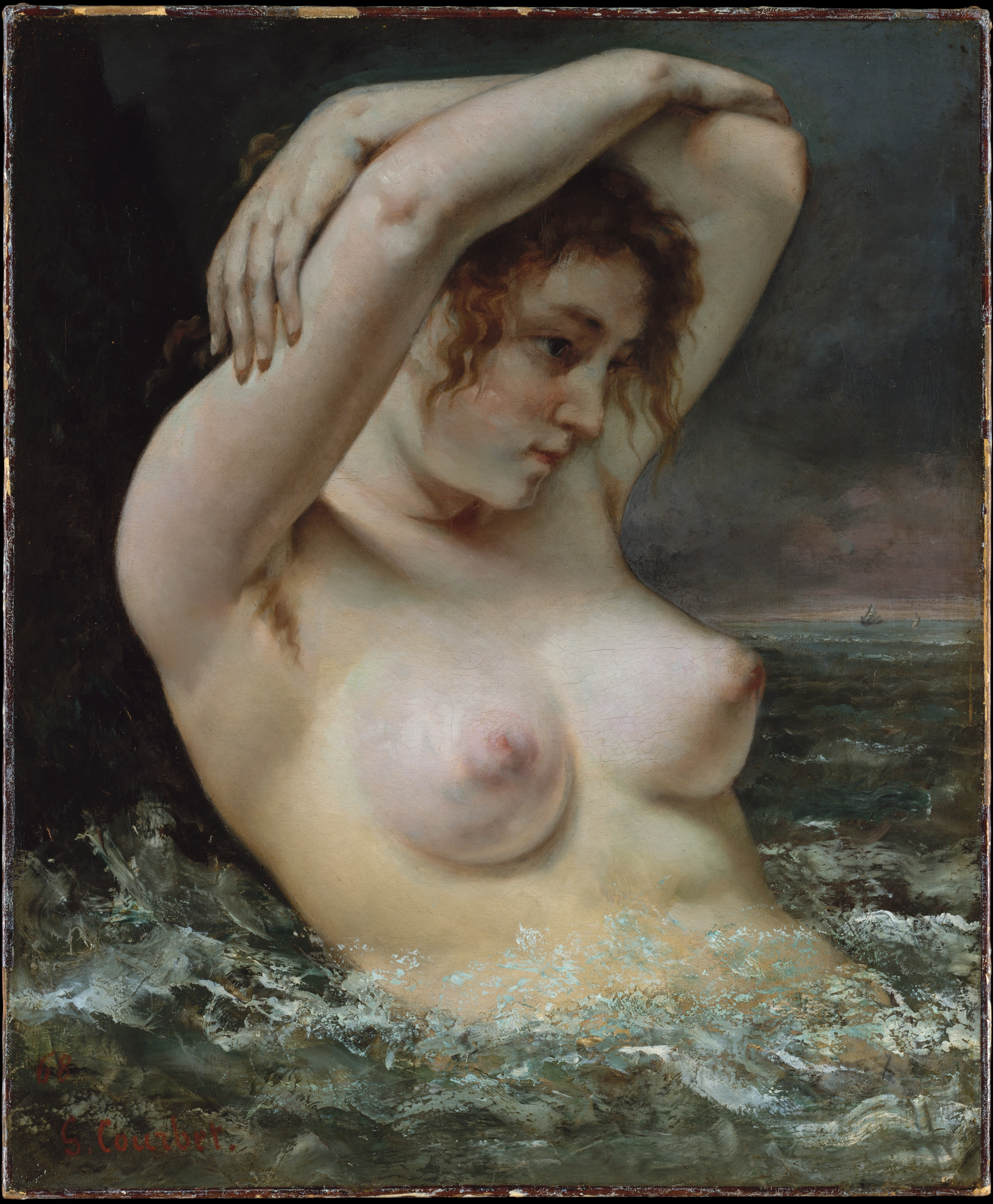
- Artist: Gustave Courbet
- Year: 1868
- Medium: Oil on canvas
- Dimensions: 65.4 cm × 54 cm (25.7 in × 21 in)
- Location: Metropolitan Museum of Art; New York
- Accession: 29.100.62

The Woman in the Waves (French - La Femme à la vague) is an 1868 painting by the French Realist painter Gustave Courbet, now in the Metropolitan Museum of Art in New York.

The picture is notable for its realistic flesh tones and trace of underarm hair.

The work is on view in the Metropolitan Museum's Gallery 811.
